= Marguerite Delaporte =

Marguerite Delaporte (c. 1610 – after 1682) was a professional French poisoner and fortune teller. She was one of the accused in the Affair of the Poisons (1677–1682).

Delaporte was the widow of a baker. She was a professional fortune teller who claimed to see visions in a glass of water after it had been prepared with spells. During the Poison Affair she was pointed out as a customer of the master poisoner Maitre Pierre, who claimed that she, as well as Marie Bosse, La Voisin, and Catherine Trianon, all bought poison from him for the use of their clients. Delaporte herself claimed, that when a customer asked her to foretell the death of her spouse, she would always answer that it was in the hands of God.

It was Delaporte who introduced La Voisin to her lover, the alchemist Denis Poculot. Poculot was later kidnapped by the marquis de Termes, who demanded that he manufacture gold for him, and it was the release of Poculot which would be the official errand of the poisoned petition La Voisin attempted to present King Louis XIV in her attempted regicide.

Delaporte was also among those pointed out by Marguerite Monvoisin to have participated in the black masses arranged by Etienne Guibourg for Madame de Montespan. She was to have participated together with La Pelletier.

Delaporte belonged to the group consisting of 14 individuals to have had direct contact with de Montespan, alongside Monvoisin, Guibourg, Adam Lesage, Romani, Bertrand, Monsieur and Madame Vautier, Magdelaine Chapelain, Philippe Galet, Latour, La Pelletier, Lafrasse and La Belliere, and who were therefore not put on trial, but imprisoned for life without trial by a lettre de cachet.
