= Pierre Bonnard (Poison Affair) =

French secretary, defendant in the Affair of the Poisons

Pierre Bonnard (floruit 1680), was a French servant and secretary. He is known for his involvement in the Affair of the Poisons (1677-1682).

== Life ==
Pierre Bonnard was employed as a secretary of François-Henri de Montmorency, duc de Luxembourg. Luxembourg gave Bonnard the task to retake some business document kept by the business agent Dupin. When he failed, he commissioned Adam Lesage to assist him by the help of witchcraft. Lesage in turn assigned the priest Gilles Davot to perform a magic ritual during the mass with a paper containing the signature of Luxembourg. Lesage continued to perform magical services to obtain the document for Bonnard, up until March 1679, when he was arrested.

During the Poison Affair, Luxemburg reported Bonnard himself to the Chambre Ardante for witchcraft, but Louvois dismissed it with the reply that the commission was tasked to handle cases of poison, not sorcery. Luxembourg was advised to dismiss Bonnard, which he did. However, when Lesage testified that Luxembourg had hired the services of Marie Bosse and Marie Vigoreaux to murder a businessman and that Bonnard had acted as his middleman in this transaction, and that Vigoreaux had placed a contract killer in the Luxembourg household to kill his wife on his commission, Bonnard was arrested.

Bonnard was arrested and interrogated and promised lenient treatment if he confessed to the allegations, which he did. During the confrontation between Bonnard and Luxembourg in prison, Luxembourg denied all allegations, and Bonnard retook all of his confessions that implicated his former employer, and claimed that Luxembourg had not been aware of any of his criminal actions.

On 8 May 1680 Pierre Bonnard was sentenced to become a galley slave for life for witchcraft and impiety.
