= M. Vautier =

French poisoner

M. Vautier (floruit 1682), was a French perfurmer and poisoner. He is known for his involvement in the Affair of the Poisons (1677–1682).

== Life ==
M. (Maitre or Monsieur) Vautier and his wife Madame Vautier were both active as perfumers in Paris. Unofficially, they also produced poison for commercial use.

During the Poison Affair, the Vautier couple were named as poison producers by La Voisin. On 24 April 1679, fifteen individuals were arrested for being associates of La Voisin, among them La Jacob, La Hebert, Jeanne Leroux, Monsieur and Madame Vautier, La Deslauriers and the stonemason Latour.

La Voisin described Vautier as "a very dangerous man", who knew much about not only perfumes but also of deadly poisons. Both Vautier himself as well as his wife were named as poison producers for La Voisin.

Marie Marguerite Montvoison testified that M. and Madame Vautier had been aware of and participated in the plot of La Voisin to assassinate king Louis XIV. Adam Lesage testified that both Vautier and the stonemason Latour had produced a poison on commission by Mademoiselle des Oeillets, intended to poison the aphrodisiac that Madame de Montespan regularly purchased from La Voisin to give to the king.

M. Vautier and his wife belonged to the many suspects of the Poison Affair that were excluded from all legal action and instead imprisoned for life by a lettre de chachet when the Poison Affair was interrupted in 1682.
