= Marguerite Joly =

French poison maker and poisoner (1637–1681)

Marguerite Joly (c. 1637 – 19 December 1681) was a professional French poisoner. She was one of the accused in the Affair of the Poisons, which lasted from 1677 to 1682.

In March 1680, Joly was arrested in connection to the Poison Affair, when she was pointed out by Etienne Guibourg. She was described as a skillful professional poisoner and poison manufacturer who equalled La Voisin in rank, and said to be extremely dangerous. During torture, Joly admitted being a professional abortionist. She also claimed to have knowledge of human sacrifices of infants during black masses.

Marguerite Joly became the star witness in the case against Francoise de Dreux. Dreux had been acquitted in April 1680, but was arrested a second time because of the testimony of Joly. She pointed out Dreux as her regular client in her capacity of poisoner. She claimed that Dreux had poisoned two former lovers, Pajot and de Varennes; that she had tried to poison the Duchess de Richelieu, the wife of her lover Duke de Richelieu; that she had plans to murder her brother and sister-in-law Monsieur and Madame Saintot, as well as all rivals who was ever visible around her lover Duke de Richelieu. The first mentioned deaths could not be proven as murders, however, and the eventual attempted murders of the others had not succeeded, if they had taken place. Dreux left the country after the arrest of Joly, but a warrant for her arrest was issued. Dreux was judged guilty in her absence because of the statement of Joly.

Marguerite Joly was sentenced to be burned at the stake. Before her execution, she was subjected to water torture. During the torture, she confessed to several murders and pointed out Anne Meline as her accomplice. She claimed that she had been present at the sacrifice of the nephew of La Poignard to Satan; at the sacrifice of an infant at a black mass for a Mademoiselle de Saint-Laurens to induce a desired marriage; that she had committed murder supplied with poisons by a female cosmetic in collaboration with Meline, who had also murdered Joly's former spouse.

As soon as the torture stopped, however, she retracted her statements, with the exception of that regarding Saint-Laurens. She was executed the same night.
