= Madame de Brinvilliers =

French murderer (1630–1676)

Marie-Madeleine d'Aubray
- Marquise de Brinvilliers
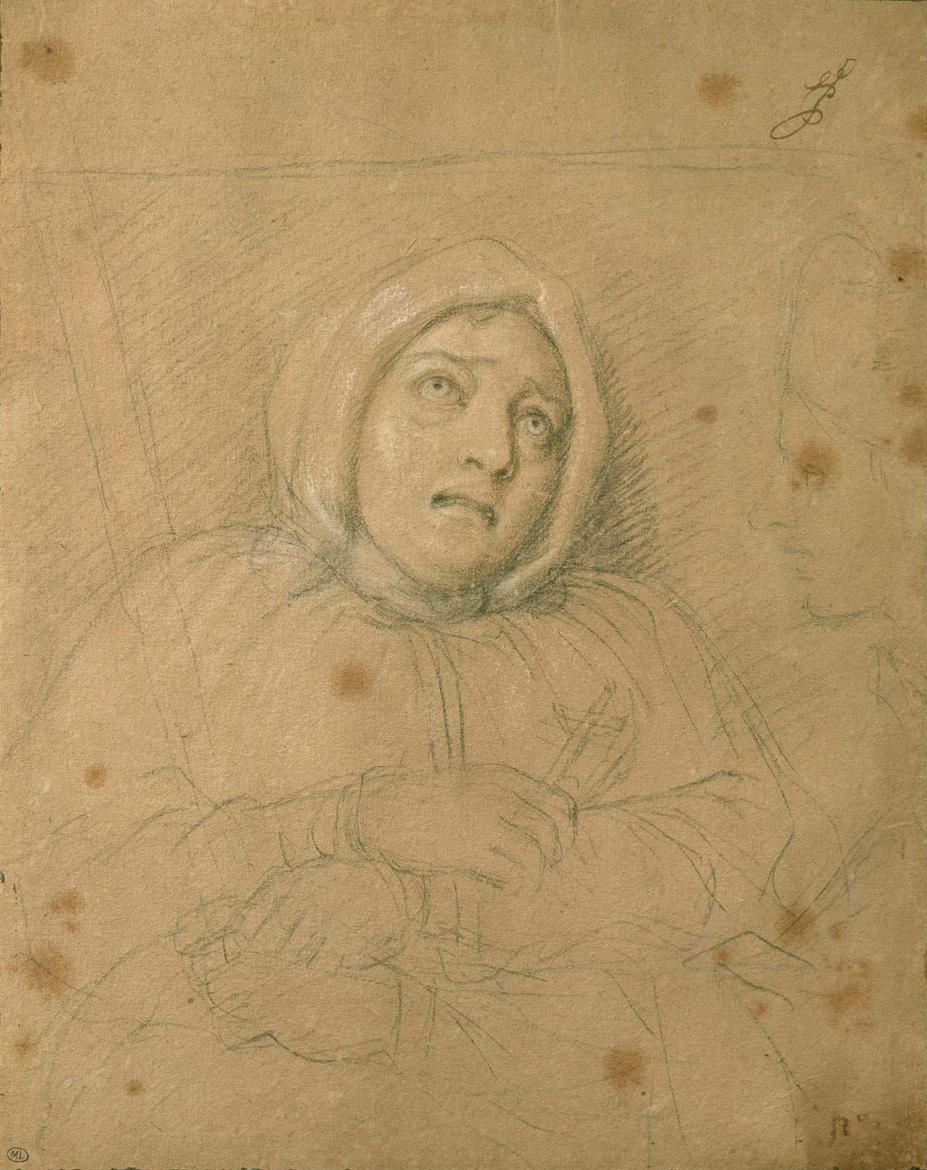
- Portrait of the Marquise on the day of her execution by Charles Le Brun, 1676
- Born: 22 July 1630; Paris, Kingdom of France
- Died: 16 July 1676 (aged 45); Paris, Kingdom of France
- Cause of death: Beheaded by French government
- Spouse: Antoine Gobelin (m. 1651–1676)
- Father: Antoine Dreux d'Aubray
- Mother: Marie Olier

Marie-Madeleine d'Aubray, Marquise de Brinvilliers (French: [bʁɛ̃vilje]; 22 July 1630 – 16 July 1676) was a French aristocrat who was convicted of murdering her father and two of her brothers in order to inherit their estates. After her death, there was speculation that she tested her poisons on upwards of 30 sick people in hospitals and street dogs, but these rumours were never confirmed. Her crimes were discovered after the death of her lover and co-conspirator, Captain Godin de Sainte-Croix, who saved letters detailing dealings of poisonings between the two. After being arrested, she was tortured, forced to confess, and finally executed. Her trial and death spawned the onset of the Affair of the Poisons, a major scandal during the reign of Louis XIV accusing aristocrats of practising witchcraft and poisoning people. Components of her life have been adapted into various media including short stories, poems, and songs to name a few.

== Early life ==
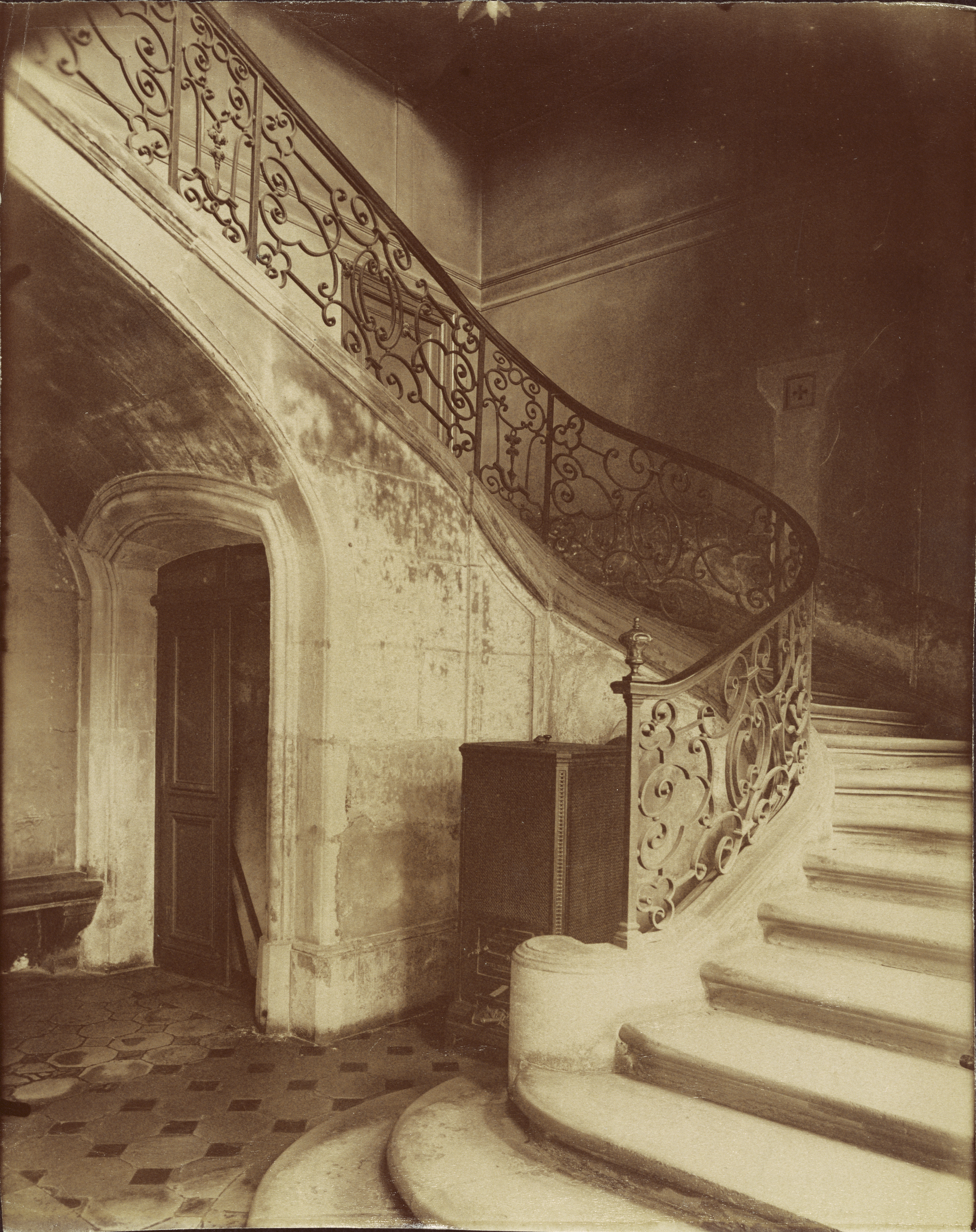
Staircase in the Brinvilliers home

The Marquise was born in 1630 to the relatively wealthy and influential household of d'Aubray. Her father, Antoine Dreux d'Aubray (1600–1666), held multiple important governmental and high-ranking positions such as the Seigneur of Offémont and Villiers, councillor of State, Master of Requests, the Civil Lieutenant and prévôt of the city of Paris, and Lieutenant General of the Mines of France. Her mother, Marie Olier (1602–1637) was the sister of Jean-Jacques Olier, who founded the Sulpicians and helped establish the settlement of Ville-Marie in New France, which would later be called Montreal. In her confession, the Marquise acknowledged being sexually assaulted at the age of seven, though she did not name her assaulter. Further admitted in her confession is that she also had sexual relations with her younger brother Antoine, whom she would later poison.

Though the eldest of five children and loved by her father, she would not inherit his estate and was thus expected to marry into another. Coming from a family of such wealth, whomever she married would inherit quite a large dowry from her, 200,000 livres, in fact. At the age of 21, in 1651, she was married to Antoine Gobelin, Baron de Nourar, and Chevalier in the order of Saint Jean of Jerusalem and later Marquis de Brinvilliers, whose estate was worth 800,000 livres. His wealth came from his ancestors' famed tapestry workshops. His father was the President of the Chamber of Accounts. Upon marriage, the Marquise's father bestowed upon the couple a house at 12 rue Neuve St. Paul in Marais, an aristocratic district of Paris. With the Marquis de Brinvilliers, she soon had three children, two girls and a boy. She had a total of seven children, at least four of whom are suspected of being illegitimate children from the Marquise's various affairs. The Marquis befriended a fellow officer, Godin de Sainte-Croix, and introduced him to the Marquise; she would later have a long-lasting affair with Sainte-Croix.

The Marquise's father was displeased to hear of his daughter's sexual affair with Sainte-Croix (which if became public, could damage his reputation due to his high position in French society) and was further displeased that the Marquise was in the process of separating her wealth from that of her husband (who was gambling it away), which was almost akin to divorcing him, a major faux-pas in French aristocratic society. Due to her father's position as a prévôt, granting him a large amount of power and influence, in 1663 he instigated a lettre de cachet, against her lover, Sainte-Croix, which called for his arrest and imprisonment at the Bastille. While riding in a carriage with the Marquise de Brinvilliers, Sainte-Croix was arrested in front of her and thrown in the Bastille for a little under two months. The Marquise later commented that perhaps if her father had not had her lover arrested, she might have never poisoned her father.

Many historians say that it was during his time in the Bastille that Sainte-Croix learned much about the art of poisoning. He was imprisoned in the Bastille at the same time as the infamous Exili (also known as Eggidi), an Italian in the service of Queen Christina of Sweden, who was an expert on poisons. Exili was imprisoned in the Bastille not because he had committed a crime, but rather because Louis XIV was suspicious of his presence in France because the courts of Sweden and France were not on the best of terms at the time. Other historians say that it is highly possible that Sainte-Croix was already an acquaintance of Christopher Glaser, a famed Swiss pharmaceutical chemist and had attended some lectures given by him. Yet, other historians doubt that Sainte-Croix came into contact with either and might have just been using their well-established names to sell his poisons for a higher price.

Upon his release from prison, Sainte-Croix married but remained in close contact with the Marquise. Sainte-Croix started an alchemy business to allow him to work with poisons, about which he now knew a lot from his time in prison, by obtaining the necessary license to use certain equipment in order to distil his poisons. It was under his tutelage that the Marquise de Brinvilliers started to experiment with poisons and concoct ideas of revenge.

== Crimes ==
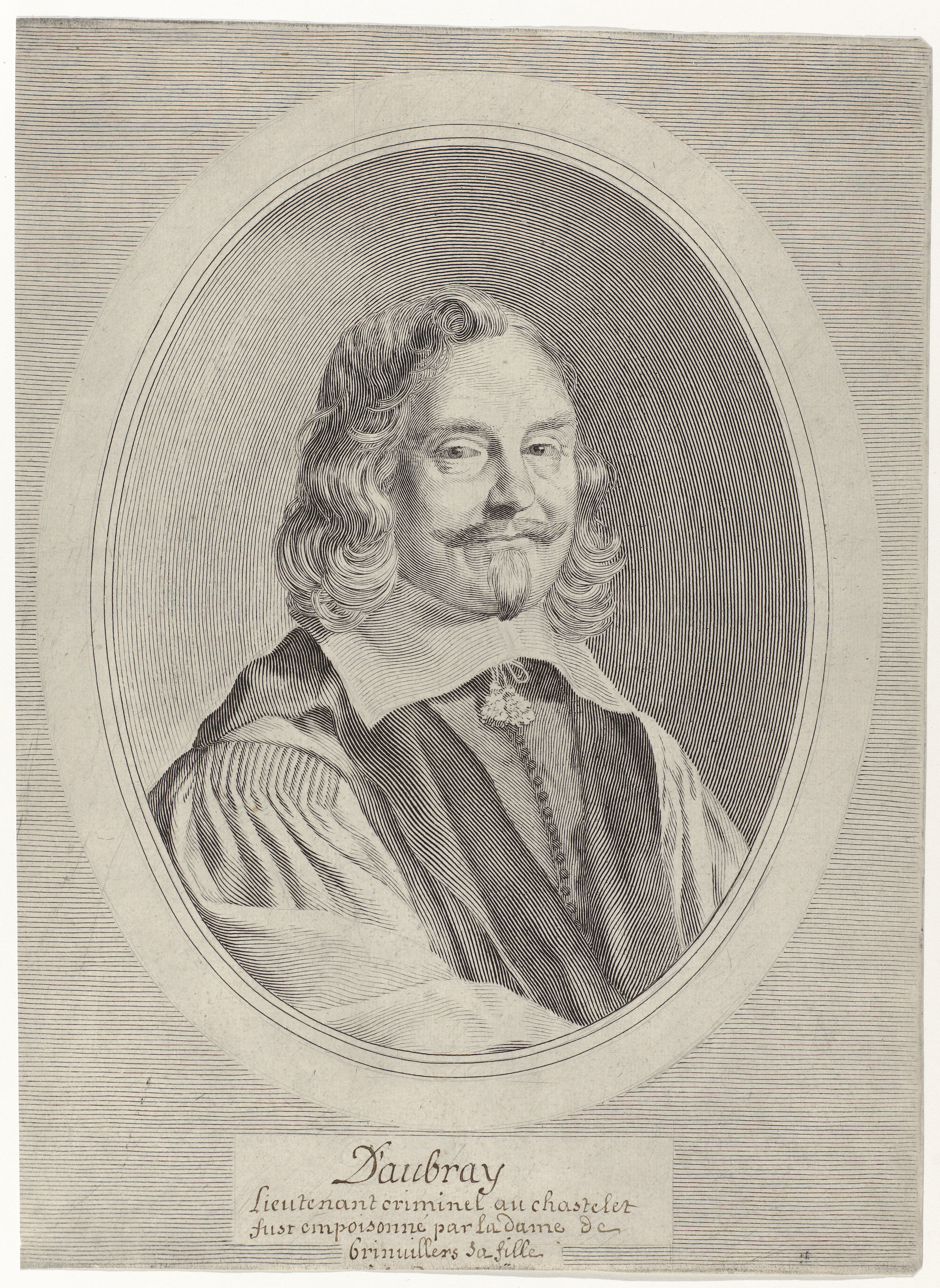
Antoine Dreux d'Aubray, poisoned by his daughter, the Marquise de Brinvilliers. Engraving by Claude Mellan

It has been suggested by many researching the Marquise that before poisoning her father she tested out her poisons on unsuspecting sick hospital patients. This theory comes from a report made by the lieutenant general of the Paris police, Gabriel Nicolas de La Reynie, who, in speaking of the Marquise, indicated that she, a pretty and delicate high-born woman from a respectable family, amused herself in observing how different dosages of her poisons took effect in the sick.

Scholars who support and acknowledge this theory do so because the era in which the Marquise lived would have enabled a woman of her rank to get away with murder quite easily. Typical for the era, female members of French nobility would often visit hospitals to help care for the sick. Because many of these patients were already ill, it provided the means for the Marquise to test out her poisons without much suspicion. She tested out her poisons at the Hôtel Dieu hospital close to Notre Dame. Furthermore, because Hôtel Dieu was not a very well-managed hospital, as it was overflowing with patients, and was more concerned with saving souls than saving lives, deaths, even those under suspicious circumstances, often went unnoticed. She also started to experiment on her servants, giving them food tainted with her experimental poisons. The Marquise was not tried for these crimes, however, because they were only attributed to her after her execution.

In 1666, the Marquise started to slowly poison her father, who died on 10 September. She placed a man, Gascon, in her father's household to slowly administer poison to him. In the week before his death, her father invited the Marquise and her children to stay with him. She gave him multiple doses of "Glaser's recipe," a tried-and-true mixture of chemicals that would render him dead seemingly of natural causes. Antoine Dreux d'Aubrey died with the Marquise at his side. An autopsy was performed on his body which concluded that Dreux d'Aubrey died of natural causes, exacerbated by gout. After the death of her father, the Marquise inherited some of his wealth. She quickly burned through the money, and, needing more, decided to poison her two brothers, hoping to get their share of her father's fortune as she was, to the best of her knowledge, their next heir.

Her two brothers lived in the same household, but the Marquise was not on the best of terms with either of them, making them harder to poison slowly than her father. She thus employed Jean Hamelin, more commonly known as La Chaussée, to work as a footman in her brothers' household. La Chaussée went to work straight away. Antoine d'Aubray actually suspected that he was perhaps a target of attempted poison when he noticed that his drink had a metallic taste to it. La Chaussée's attempt at poisoning him there failed, but not long after, during an Easter feast, Antoine d'Aubray fell ill after eating a pie and never recovered, dying on 17 June 1670. The second brother was poisoned soon after, dying in September of the same year; their subsequent autopsies would hint at poison due to the fact that their intestines were suspiciously coloured; nevertheless, the conclusion was that they had both died of "malignant humour". Numerous individuals around the inquest into the brothers' deaths were suspicious that they had been poisoned, especially because their deaths occurred so close to one another and in such similar circumstances, but La Chaussée was never suspected; in fact, he was so well-loved by the younger Dreux brother that, upon his death, he bequeathed one hundred écus to La Chaussée.

== Discovery of her crimes and her escape and capture ==
The Marquise's poisonings were not discovered initially, and in fact continued to be unknown until 1672, upon the death of her lover and conspirator, Sainte-Croix. Many claim that Sainte-Croix died because an accident exposed him to his own poisons. However, others argue that this is purely speculation and that Sainte-Croix simply died of natural causes. At the time of his death, Sainte-Croix owed a great deal of money. Among his possessions was a box containing letters between him and the Marquise, various poisons, and a note promising a sum of money to Sainte-Croix from the Marquise, dated around the time her father first starting feeling ill; this re-opened the case for foul play against her father and brothers. These items were instructed to be given to the Marquise upon his death, and thus were resealed and given to the Commissary Picard until formal procedures could take place. La Chaussée, hearing that Picard was in charge of Sainte-Croix's remaining affairs, went to him explaining that his former boss owed him money, and in explaining this, provided a suspiciously accurate account of Sainte-Croix's laboratory. Picard mentioned to La Chaussée that among Sainte-Croix's possessions was the box with the incriminating letters. La Chaussée, on hearing this, fled, leading to Picard to demand an inquest into La Chaussée for this suspicious behaviour. He was soon found, and, on interrogation, implicated not only himself but the Marquise for crimes against her family. La Chaussée was then tortured before being executed on 24 March 1673. On the same day as his execution, the Marquise was condemned in absentia for her crimes and a warrant went out for her arrest.

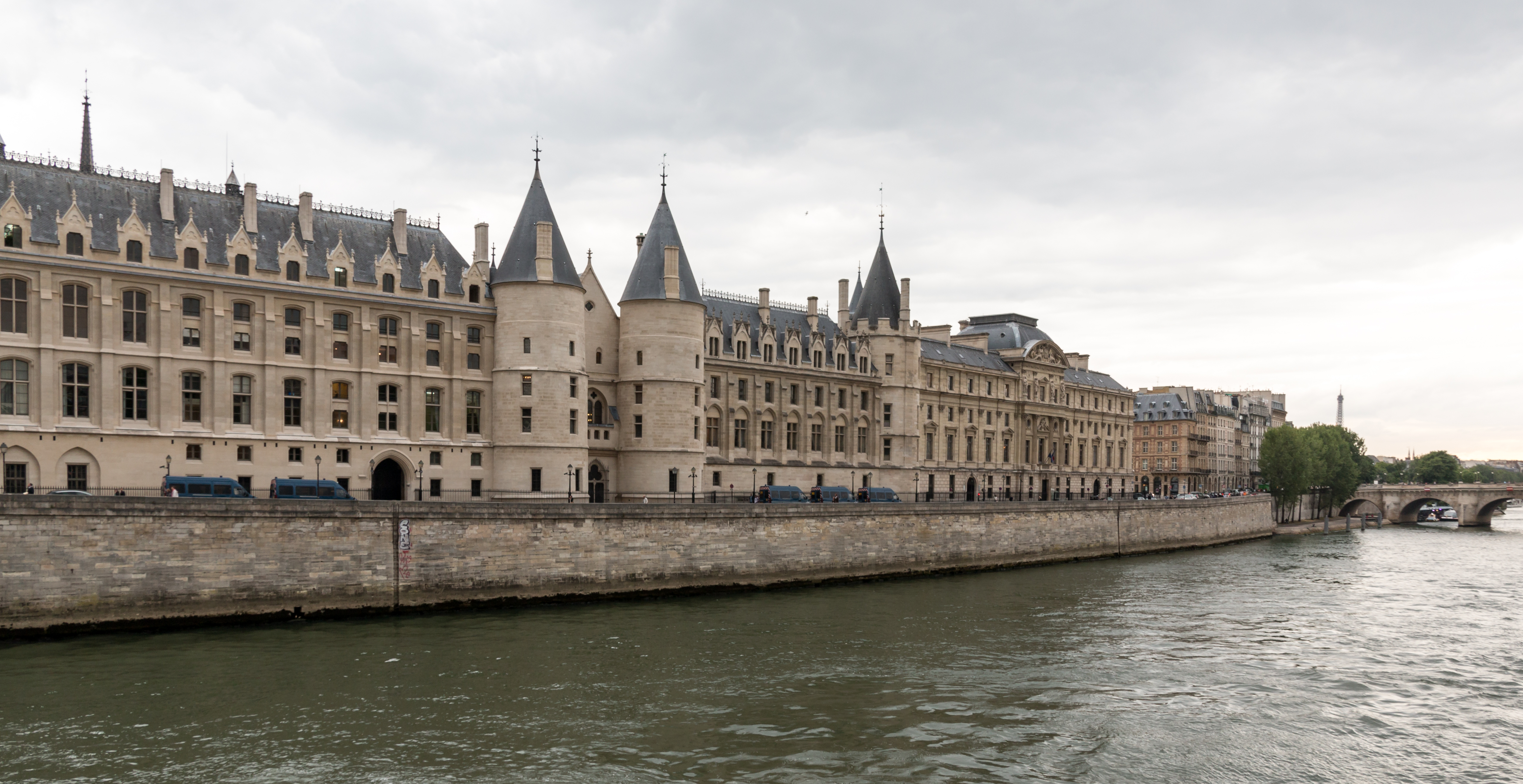
The Conciergerie, the prison where the Marquise was housed before her execution

Similarly, upon news that this box had been found, the Marquise fled France for England. She evaded authorities for a number of years. While in hiding, she survived on sums of money sent to her by her sister, Marie-Thérèse. Her sister died in 1674, leaving the Marquise with little money. She continued to evade capture, moving from place to place, including locations such as Cambrai, Valenciennes, and Antwerp. It was in Belgium that the Marquise finally was caught. In 1676, she rented a room in a convent in Liège where authorities recognized her and alerted the French government, which subsequently had her arrested. Among her possessions was a letter titled "My Confessions", which detailed the various crimes she had committed over the years along with other personal information. In this letter, she admits to having poisoned her father and two brothers, and that she had attempted to poison her daughter, sister and husband, although the latter three were unsuccessful. She also confessed to having had many affairs, and that three of her children were not her husband's. Some scholars doubt the Marquise's authenticity in her letters, but certainly the content of her confession was relied upon heavily in court. Madame de Sévigné, a French aristocrat who was a contemporary of the Marquise's, talked about her in many of her famous letters, highlighting the gossip that spread among French nobility. While being extradited to France, the Marquise made various suicide attempts. On her return to France, she was first interrogated at Mézières before being imprisoned in the Conciergerie, a prison located in Paris.

== Trial ==
Madame de Sévigné, in a letter to her daughter, wrote that the Marquise's trial captured the attention of all of Paris. Initially when questioned, the Marquise feigned ignorance, neither denying nor admitting to the accursations raised against her, but rather pretending that she was not aware of any happenings around her concerning the deaths of her family and her illicit relationship with Sainte-Croix. Much of the early interrogation centred around the money trail among her, Sainte-Croix, and Pennautier, the Marquise's financier. Later in the trial, the Marquise denied all crimes levied against her, placing blame on her former lover Sainte-Croix. This lack of substantial evidence soon changed, however, from the testimony of another of the Marquise's former lovers, Jean-Baptiste Briancourt. Briancourt alleged that not only had the Marquise admitted to him that she poisoned her brothers and father, but that she and Sainte-Croix had tried to murder him as well. The Marquise dismissed all of Briancourt's accusations against her, claiming that he was a drunkard. She was not believed, however, and after a final interrogation the verdict was returned that she was guilty of her crimes, and she was sentenced to be tortured before being executed by beheading and then having her body burned as a public spectacle.

== Torture and execution ==
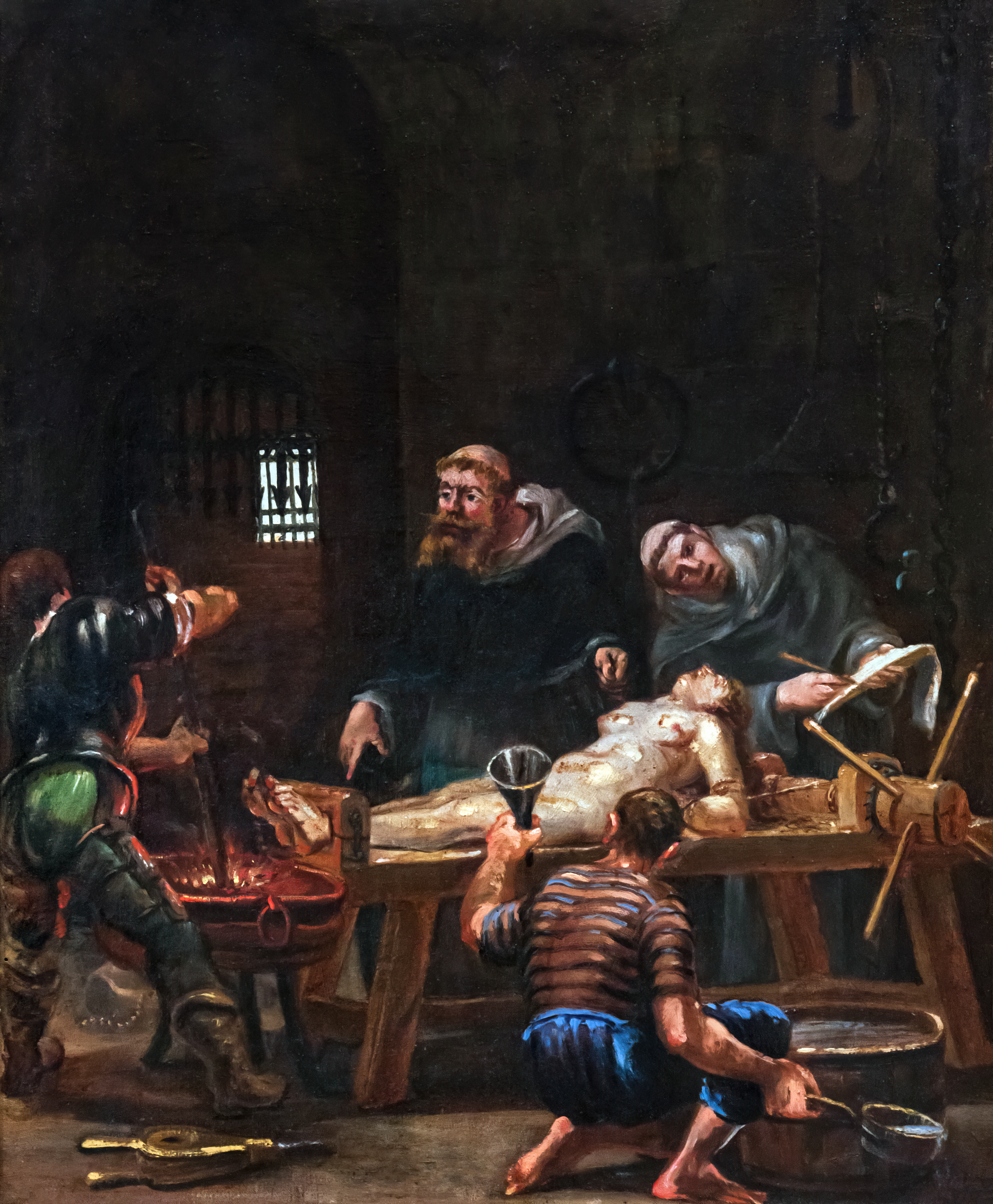
The Marquise being tortured with the water cure before her beheading (Jean-Baptiste Cariven, 1878)

As France was a Catholic state at the time of her execution, a confessor was given to the Marquise in her final hours. The man chosen was the abbé Edem Pirot, a theologian from the Sorbonne. Despite never having ministered to a criminal in their final hours, he was nonetheless chosen for the role. He compiled a grand account of her final hours of which the original copy was housed in the Jesuit Library in Paris. Within this recounting, Pirot speaks of her final hours and of her life leading up to her crimes.

Before her death, as part of her sentence, the Marquise was subjected to a form of torture known as the water cure in which the subject was made to drink (often through a funnel) copious amounts of water in a short period of time. In his account, Pirot noted that when faced with the prospect of torture, the Marquise said she would confess to everything; however, she noted that she knew that this would not alleviate her sentence of torture. Under torture, she added no information that she had not already confessed, except for saying that she had once sold poison to a man who intended to kill his wife. After four hours of torture she made her final confession to Pirot in the prison chapel. She was not allowed to take Communion before her death due to laws at the time forbidding condemned prisoners from receiving the Sacrament. As she left the chapel, a crowd of aristocrats gathered to see the spectacle of her death march as she and the abbé travelled to the Place de Grève for her execution. The Marquise was covered in a white slip, a customary outfit for the condemned at execution. On the way to her execution, they stopped at Notre Dame so that the Marquise could perform the amende honorable inside the packed Cathedral. When they finally reached the Place de Grève the Marquise was unloaded from the cart and brought up to a platform. The executioner shaved her hair before drawing a sword and chopping off her head. The surrounding area was packed with spectators who hoped to grasp a glimpse of her execution. Madame de Sévigné was among them, and in fact, her most well-known letter mentions the Marquise's execution. After the beheading, the Marquise's body was burned, of which Madame de Sévigné says that Brinvilliers was (or, rather, her ashes were) "up in the air."

== Ramifications ==
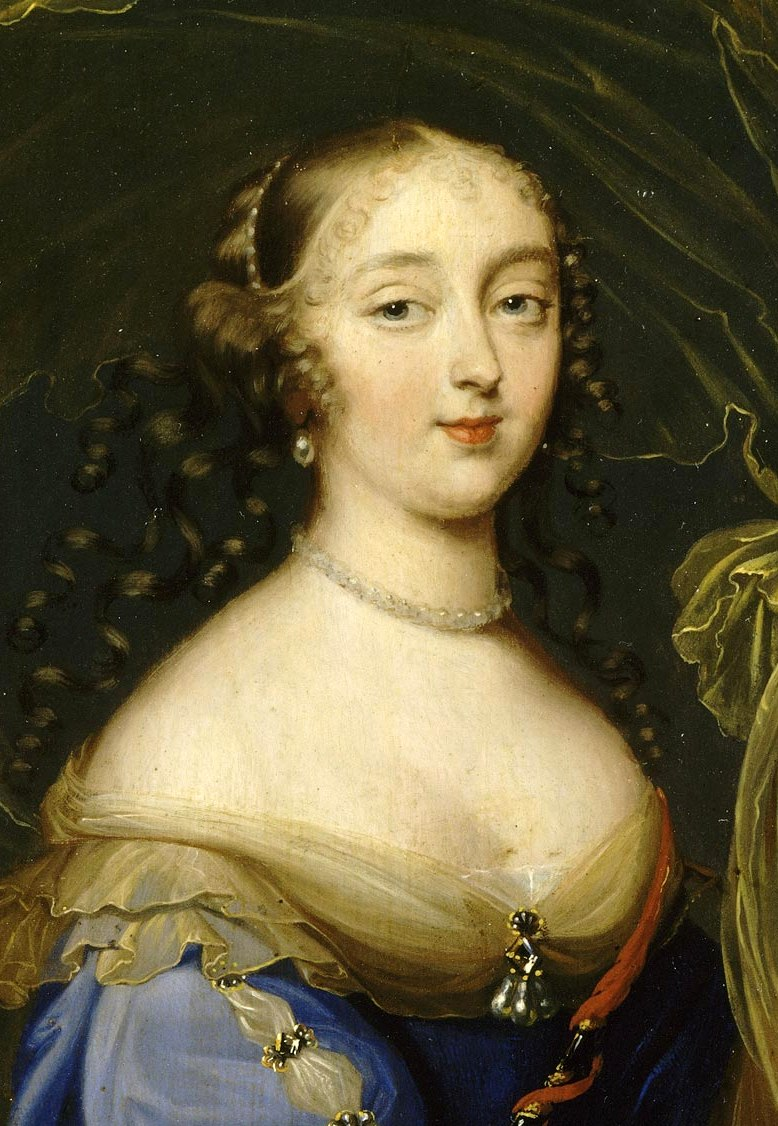
Painting of Madame de Montespan, mistress of Louis XIV who was implicated in the affair of the poisons

After the Marquise's execution, authorities, notably La Reynie and Louis XIV, were convinced that the Marquise could not have acted alone, and more individuals were involved than Sainte-Croix, La Chaussée, and Pennautier. Because the first two were already dead, an investigation was launched into Pennautier. Nothing came of this investigation however, and Pennautier was cleared of all formal suspicions. The inquest into the Marquise's accomplices did not stop there. As La Reynie explained in a letter, because someone so highborn was involved in such a deadly scandal, it was not a far leap of thought that other members of the nobility could be involved in poisonings and other suspicious manners of death. Many people in high positions of power were arrested and tried for murder and other criminal dealings. This gradually expanded until 1679 when the investigations came to a head in what was known as the Affair of the Poisons, in which a few hundred individuals were arrested. Notable individuals implicated included Catherine Monvoisin, a fortune-teller better known as La Voisin, Madame de Montespan, a mistress of the king, and Olympia Mancini, the Countess of Soissons.

== Popular culture ==
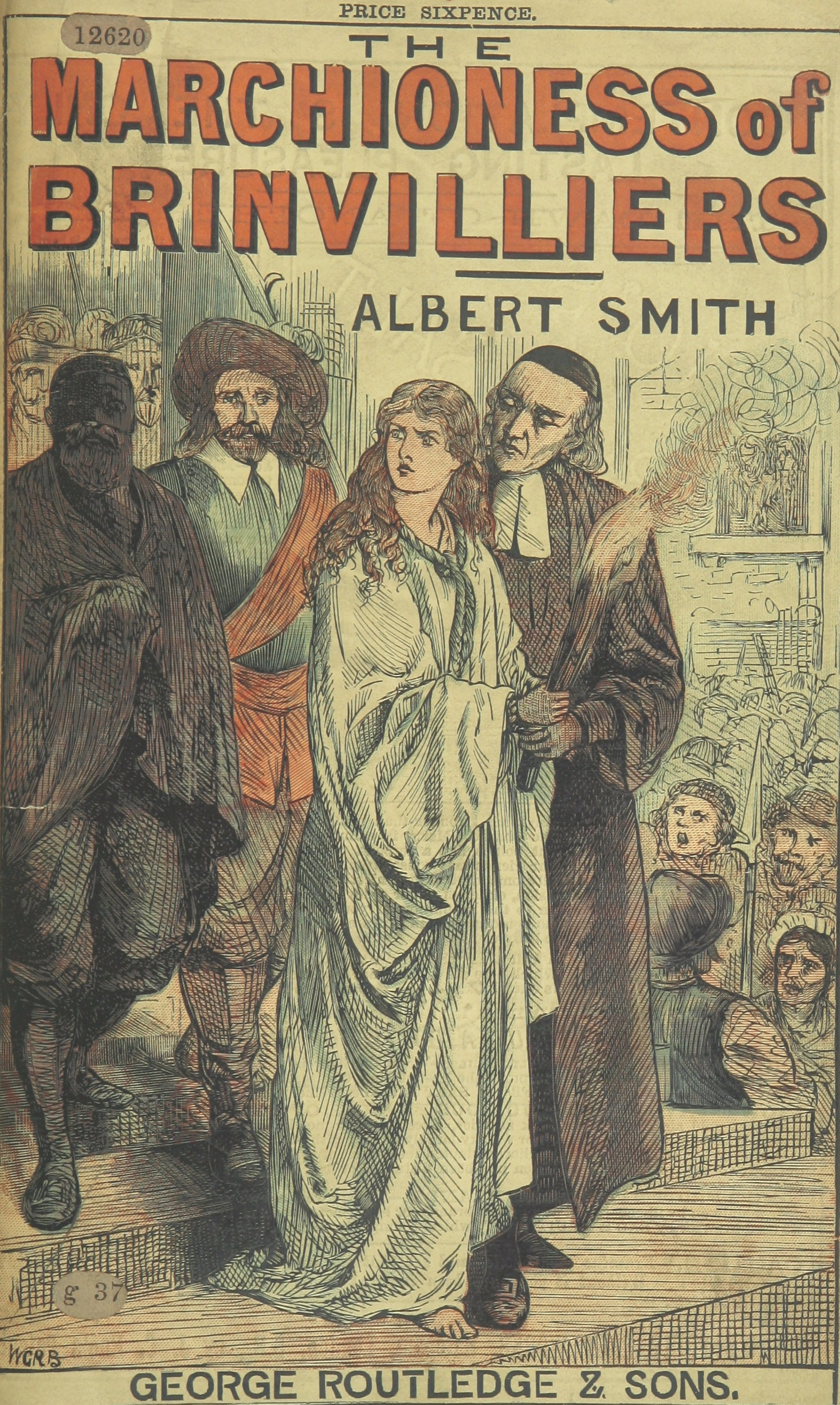
The Marchioness of Brinvilliers: The Poisoner of the Seventeenth Century, an 1846 novel by Albert Richard Smith (1887 edition)

Fictional accounts of her life include The Leather Funnel by Arthur Conan Doyle, The Marquise de Brinvilliers by Alexandre Dumas, père, The Devil's Marchioness by William Fifield, Intrigues of a Poisoner by Émile Gaboriau, and The Marchioness of Brinvilliers: The Poisoner of the Seventeenth Century, by Albert Richard Smith. In her 1836 poem, "A Supper of Madame de Brinvilliers", Letitia Elizabeth Landon envisages the poisoning of a discarded lover. Robert Browning's 1846 poem "The Laboratory" imagines an incident in her life. Her capture and burning are mentioned in The Oracle Glass by Judith Merkle Riley, also the poisoning of the poor is echoed by the main character, Genevieve's, mother. The plot of the novel The Burning Court by John Dickson Carr concerns a murder that appears to be the work of the ghost of Marie d'Aubray Brinvilliers.

There have been two musical treatments of her life. An opera titled La marquise de Brinvilliers with music by nine composers—Daniel Auber, Désiré-Alexandre Batton, Henri Montan Berton, Giuseppe Marco Maria Felice Blangini, François-Adrien Boieldieu, Michele Carafa, Luigi Cherubini, Ferdinand Hérold, and Ferdinando Paer—premiered at the Paris Opéra-Comique in 1831. A musical comedy called Mimi – A Poisoner's Comedy, written by Allen Cole, Melody Johnson and Rick Roberts, premiered in Toronto, Canada in September 2009.

The radio docu-drama Crime Classics featured her story in 1954. The 2009 French television film The Marquise of Darkness (French: La Marquise des Ombres) starred Anne Parillaud as de Brinvilliers.

== See also ==
- The Affair of the Poisons
- List of French serial killers
- La Voisin
