= Catherine Lepère =

French midwife (1601–1679)

Catherine Lepère (1601–1679) was a French midwife. She was an associate of La Voisin and one of the accused in the Affair of the Poisons (1677-1682).

== Biography ==
Lepère was a licensed midwife who had delivered La Voisin's own children. She performed abortions for clients remitted to her by La Voisin.

Lepère was arrested in 1679, as were many other associates of La Voisin, after having been pointed out by Marie Bosse. She admitted having performed abortions, which were illegal at the time, but pointed out that she had prevented many scandals involving upper class ladies by doing so, and that she considered that she had performed a community service. She received her clients from La Voisin, who took almost all the profit. Marie Bosse claimed that fetuses who had been aborted late in the pregnancy were burned in an oven at La Voisin or buried in the garden of La Voisin, but this was never investigated and therefore unconfirmed, as Louis XIV had given the order that the part of La Voisin's enterprise which had to do with abortions should not be pursued further.

Lepère was sentenced to death for abortion on 11 August 1679. She was also sentenced to be tortured, but because of her advanced age, she was merely fastened in the torture device without it being put to actual use, as there was a fear that she would die of the torture rather than the execution if the torture was actually applied. She was executed by hanging.

== In fiction ==
Catherine Lepère is portrayed in a novel by Judith Merkle Riley: The Oracle Glass (1994).
