= Christopher Glaser =

Swiss chemist

Christopher Glaser (1615 – between 1670 and 1678), a pharmaceutical chemist of the 17th century.

== Life ==
He was born in Basel. He became demonstrator of chemistry, as successor of Lefebvre, at the Jardin du Roi in Paris, and apothecary to Louis XIV and to the Duke of Orléans. He is best known through his Traité de la chymie (Paris, 1663), which went through some ten editions in about twenty-five years, and was translated into both German and English.

It has been alleged that he was an accomplice in the notorious poisonings carried out by Madame de Brinvilliers, but the extent of his complicity in providing Godin de Sainte-Croix poison in the Affair of the Poisons is doubtful. He appears to have died before 1676. The sal polychrestum Glaseri is normal potassium sulfate which Glaser prepared and used medicinally. The mineral K_{3}Na(SO_{4}) _{2} (Glaserite) is named after him.
