= Denis Poculot, Sieur de Blessis =

Denis Poculot, Sieur de Blessis (floruit 1679) was a French alchemist. He is known for his involvement in the Affair of the Poisons (1677-1682).

== Career ==
Denis Poculot was active as an alchemist in Paris. He had clients in the elite, and achieved a good reputation for knowledge in alchemy. He was a business partner of La Voisin, and was also at one point her lover.

Poculot was kidnapped in 1678 by the cousin of the king's mistress Madame de Montespan, Roger de Pardaillon de Gondrin, and Marquis de Termes, who kept him a private prisoner in his castle in order to force him to reveal the whereabouts of the Philosopher's stone.

In 1679, La Voisin was arrested shortly before she was to assassinate King Louis XIV by presenting him with a poisoned petition. The petition contained an appeal to the monarch to order Termes to release Poculot.

Denis Poculot, Sieur de Blessis was himself arrested and charged with the occult crime of alchemy. He was condemned to become a galley slave.
