= Marguerite Monvoisin =

17th-century French prisoner

Marie Marguerite Mon(t)voisin (born c. 1658, died after 1682) was the daughter of La Voisin and a main witness in the Affair of the Poisons. It was her statement, made after the execution of her mother, that implicated the royal mistress Madame de Montespan in the process, causing Louis XIV to eventually disrupt the whole investigation and classify it as secret.

== Life ==
Marie Marguerite Monvoisin was the daughter of the jeweler Antoine Monvoisin and the famous professional fortune teller La Voisin. Her mother was in fact the center of a criminal network providing poison and black masses for the aristocracy. She was not arrested with her mother on 12 March 1679, but remained with her father until his death of natural causes in May 1679. On 26 January 1680, she and her two brothers were arrested and taken to Vincennes for questioning. The reason for their arrest is unknown.

=== Testimony ===
In July and August 1680, after the execution of her mother in February, Marguerite Monvoisin made a confession which revealed her mother's list of clients, her connection to Madame de Montespan and the attempted murder of the monarch. About the same time, Adam Lesage made his confession, which added that child sacrifice had taken place during the black masses arranged by La Voisin.

On 1 October, Françoise Filastre confirmed Monvoisin's statement about Montespan and Lesage's statement about child sacrifice. The confession involved so many people of high rank that the king ordered the official investigation closed. On 9 October, Monvoisin confirmed the statement of child sacrifice made by Lesage and Filastre, followed by the confirmation of Étienne Guibourg on 10 October. The statement of Marguerite Monvoisin was considered vital, in particular as she was not accused to have taken part in any crime personally, but was exclusively a witness.

=== Imprisonment ===
The remaining members of the organisation were never put on trial, but incarcerated for life by lettre de cachet, and their confessions were sealed. All the prisoners were condemned to silence and their guards informed that they tend to be habitual liars about Madame de Montespan. Étienne Guibourg, Louis Galet, Adam Lesage and Romani were incarcerated at Château de Besançon, and Bertrand at Château de Salces; Marguerite Monvoisin, together with her mother's female associates La Pelletière, La Poulain, Magdelaine Chapelain, Marguerite Delaporte and Catherine Leroy, were imprisoned at Belle-Île-en-Mer. The date of her death is unknown.

It was ordered that the female prisoners from the Poison Affair should be guarded by women to prevent that they use their sexuality to escape. Unlike their male accomplices, the women were not to be chained as long as they behaved well. The information about the prisoners during their internment is scarce: in a rare note, it was mentioned that in January 1687, the women at Belle-Île-en-Mer were granted the use of braziers in midwinter, which is notable as it was one of the few times they were mentioned post trial.
