= Guibourg =

Guibourg is a surname. Notable people with the surname include:

- Étienne Guibourg (1610–1680), French Roman Catholic abbé who performed Black Masses for Catherine Monvoisin in the Affair of the Poisons
- Georges Guibourg (1891–1970), French singer, author, writer, playwright, and actor
