= Jacques Cotton =

French priest and occultist

Jacques Joseph Cotton (died 1680), was a French priest. He is known for his involvement in the Affair of the Poisons (1677-1682).

== Life ==
Jacques Cotton was a Roman Catholic priest. He was a business colleague of Françoise Filastre, who commissioned him on several occasions to officiate on black masses and call upon demons for her upper class clients.

During the Poison Affair, Filastre named Cotton as the priest who officiated at a mass in 1673 or 1674, during which he had summoned three demon princes to assist her to make a pact with the Devil. Cotton was arrested and confessed that he had conducted a number of black masses on commission by Filastre, sometimes using wax dolls at the altar, and that these masses had not always been merely to produce luck in love, but also, on at least one occasion, in order to cause a death. Filastre also stated that she had hired Cotton to conduct masses over the medical powders she had bought from Philippe Galet to make them more potent, and that she had sold several such poisons to Magdelaine Chapelain.

Such powders were found in the house of Chapelain, who confessed that it was aphrodisiac blessed by Cotton. He had also been commissioned by Filastre to read magic spells over a document belonging to a client of Filastre, Antoinette de Mesmes, duchesse de Vivonne, to have the wishes written upon it fulfilled: that the Devil would provide her a monthly allowance; that an enemy of her would be exiled from the royal court; and that her husband should die.

On 30 September 1680, both Françoise Filastre and Jacques Cotton were condemned to be subjected to torture and then burned alive on the stake. Normally the city of Paris did not execute people for witchcraft, but an exception was made in cases that had included sacrilege, which was the case because of the black masses. They were both executed 1 October 1680.
