= La Voisin =

French fortune teller and poisoner (d. 1680)

Catherine Monvoisin
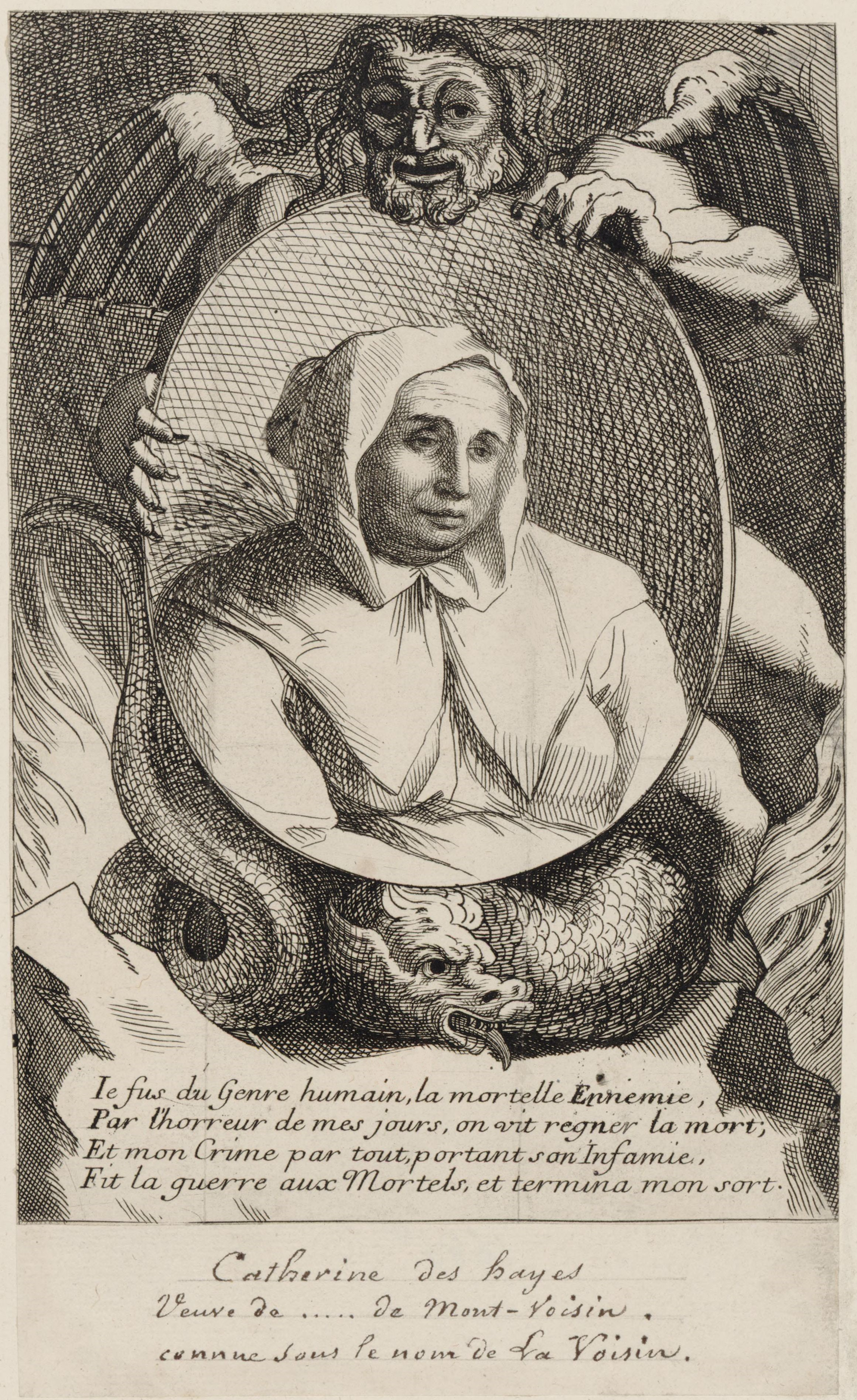
- Catherine Deshayes, "La Voisin", 17th-century print of her portrait held by a winged devil.
- Born: Catherine Deshayes c. 1640
- Died: 22 February 1680 (aged 39–40); Paris, France
- Occupation: French fortune teller · Sorceress · Poisoner
- Spouse: Antoine Monvoisin
- Criminal information
- Children: Marguerite Monvoisin
- Status: Executed
- Motive: Profit
- Criminal charge: Witchcraft
- Trial: Affair of the Poisons (17 February 1680 – 19 February 1680)
- Penalty: execution by burning

Details
- Span of crimes: 1660–1679
- Country: France
- Location: Paris
- Killed: Unknown. Provided poison for people who wished to commit murder.
- Weapon: Poison
- Date apprehended: 12 March 1679
- Imprisoned at: Vincennes

Catherine Monvoisin, or Montvoisin, née Deshayes, known as "La Voisin" (c. 1640 – 22 February 1680), was a French fortune teller, commissioned poisoner, accused of witchcraft. She was the head of a network of fortune tellers in Paris providing poison, aphrodisiacs, and abortions to clients among the aristocracy and became the central figure in the famous affaire des poisons. Her purported organization of commissioned black magic and poison murder was suspected to have killed 1,000 people, but it is believed that upwards of 2,500 people might have been murdered.

== Life ==
Little is known of Catherine Deshayes' early life. She learned fortune-telling as a child and later married Antoine Monvoisin, who was active as a jeweller and silk merchant with a shop at Pont-Marie in Paris.

When her husband's trade business led to bankruptcy, La Voisin supported the family by practising chiromancy and face-reading. In addition to being a fortune teller, she was also active as a midwife, which developed into providing abortions. Her business as a fortune teller gradually developed into manufacturing and selling purported magical objects and potions, arranging black masses and selling aphrodisiacs and poison.

From the late 1660s, La Voisin had become a wealthy and famous fortune teller with clients among the highest aristocracy of France. Among her clients were Olympia Mancini, comtesse de Soissons; Marie Anne Mancini, duchess de Bouillon; Elizabeth, comtesse de Gramont, and François-Henri de Montmorency, duc de Luxembourg.

She resided at Villeneuve-sur-Gravois, where she received her clients all day, and entertained the Parisian upper-class society at parties with violin music in her garden at night. La Voisin regularly attended service at the church of the Jansenist abbé de Sant-Amour, principal of the Paris University, and the godmother of her daughter was the noblewoman Mme de la Roche-Guyon.

She supported a family of six, including her husband, her mother, and her children. She was known to have at least six lovers: the executioner Andre Guillaume, Monsieur Latour, vicomte de Cousserans, the count de Labatie, the alchemist Blessis, the architect Fauchet, and the magician Adam Lesage. At one point, Adam Lesage tried to induce her to kill her husband, but while he was initially successful, she changed her mind and aborted the process.

La Voisin was interested in science and alchemy and financed several private projects and enterprises, some of them concocted by con artists who tried to swindle her. She was known to suffer from alcoholism, was apparently abused by Latour, and engaged in several conflicts with her rival, the poisoner Marie Bosse.

=== Abortion provider ===
La Voisin apparently started to include abortions, illegal at the time, for profit within her services as a midwife, and her clients eventually included wealthy members of the aristocracy. She had a network of abortion providers working for her, notably Catherine Lepère, who stated that she received her clients from La Voisin, who referred clients to her and took the majority of the profit as a fee.

Marie Bosse claimed that foetuses aborted late in pregnancy were burned in a furnace at the house of La Voisin and buried in her garden. However, Louis XIV gave the order that the abortion aspect of La Voisin's enterprise should not be pursued further, so this part of her business is the least investigated one, and the claims of Bosse therefore remain unconfirmed.

=== Fortune telling ===
La Voisin later said that as a fortune teller, she had merely used and developed what God had given her. She stated that she was taught the art of fortune telling at the age of nine, and that after her husband became ruined, she decided to profit by it.

She developed her art by studying modern methods of physiology and the practice of reading a client's future by studying their face and hands.

She spent a great deal of money in order to provide an atmosphere which would make her clients more inclined to believe her prophecies; for example, she had a special robe of crimson red velvet embroidered with eagles in gold made for a price of 1,500 livres to perform in.

In 1665 or 1666, her divination was questioned by the Congregation of the Mission at the Saint Vincent de Paul's order and she was called for questioning, but La Voisin defended herself successfully before the professors at Sorbonne University and was allowed to continue her business as a fortune teller.

=== Professional sorcery ===
Her business as a fortune teller gradually developed into a business of professional alleged black magic. During her activity as a fortune teller, she noticed similarities among her clients' wishes about their future: almost all wanted to have someone fall in love with them, that someone would die so that they might inherit, or that their spouses would die so that they might marry someone else.

La Voisin decided to profit financially from her clients' wishes by offering services of purported magic to make their wishes come true. Initially, she told her clients that their wish would come true if it was also the will of God. Secondly, she started to recommend to her clients some actions that would make their dreams come true. These actions were initially to visit the church of some particular saint; then she started to sell amulets, and gradually, she recommended more and more alleged magical objects or rituals of various kinds.

For those clients who wished for someone to fall in love with them, she manufactured love powders: the bones of toads, the teeth of moles, Spanish fly, iron filings, human blood and mummy, and the dust of human remains were among the alleged ingredients of the love powders concocted by La Voisin.

Finally, her most radical and expensive recommended practices were the black mass, which she arranged for clients for profit, during which the client could pray to Satan for their wish to come true. During some of these masses, a woman performed as an altar, upon which a bowl was placed: a baby was held above the bowl, and the blood from it was poured into the bowl. Whether the baby in question was actually killed on this occasion, or whether the baby was already dead by natural causes, such as being stillborn, could vary.

She had several associates working for her arranging and participating in her professional magic services, notably Adam Lesage, who performed alleged magical tasks; and the priest Étienne Guibourg and abbé Mariotte, who officiated at the black masses.

=== Poison commission ===
La Voisin finally took the step from purported magical potions, amulets, and rituals, to selling aphrodisiacs to those who wished for someone to fall in love with them, and fatal poison was given to those who wished for someone to die.

The art of poisoning had become a regular science at the time, having been developed, in part, by Giulia Tofana, a professional female poisoner in Italy, only a few decades before La Voisin. La Voisin provided a large variety of poisons for her clients and had a network of poison providers working for her, notably the apothecary Catherine Trianon.

=== Connection to Madame de Montespan ===
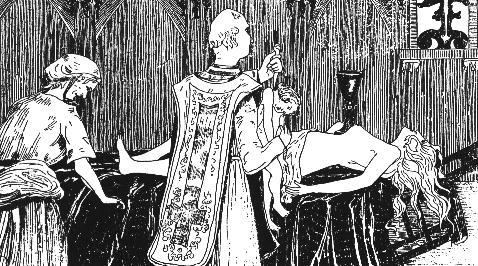
Catherine Monvoisin and the priest Étienne Guibourg are shown performing a black mass for Madame de Montespan (lying on the altar) in an 1895 engraving by Henry de Malvost

The most important client of La Voisin was Madame de Montespan, the official royal mistress to King Louis XIV. Their contact was often arranged through the companion of Montespan, Claude de Vin des Œillets. Montespan was alleged to have hired La Voisin in 1667 to arrange a black mass. This mass was performed in a house in Rue de la Tannerie. Adam Lesage and abbé Mariotte officiated, while Montespan prayed to win the love of the king. That same year, Montespan became the official mistress of the king, and after this, she employed La Voisin whenever a problem occurred in her relationship with the king.

In 1673, when the king's interest in Montespan seemed to wane, Montespan again employed La Voisin, who provided a series of black masses officiated by Étienne Guibourg. On at least one occasion, Montespan herself acted as the human altar during the mass. La Voisin also provided Montespan with an aphrodisiac, with which Montespan drugged the king. During the king's affair with Madame de Soubise, Montespan used an aphrodisiac provided by La Voisin's colleague Françoise Filastre and made by Louis Galet in Normandy.

In 1677, Montespan made it clearthat if the king should abandon her, she would have him killed. When the king entered into a relationship with Angélique de Fontanges in 1679, Montespan called for La Voisin and asked her to have both the king and Fontanges killed. La Voisin hesitated but was eventually convinced to agree. At the house of her colleague Catherine Trianon, La Voisin constructed a plan to kill the king together with the poisoners Trianon, Bertrand and Romani, the last being the fiancé of her daughter. Trianon was unwilling to participate and tried to make her change her mind by constructing an ill-fated fortune for her, but La Voisin refused to change her mind. The group decided to murder the king by poisoning a petition, to be delivered to his own hands.

On 5 March 1679, La Voisin visited the royal court in Saint-Germain to deliver the petition. That day, however, there were too many petitioners, and the king did not take their petition, which foiled her plan. Upon her return to her home in Paris, she was castigated by a group of monks. She handed the petition to her daughter Marguerite Montvoisin and asked her to burn it, which she did. The next day, she made plans to visit Catherine Trianon after mass to plan the next murder attempt upon Louis XIV.

=== Arrest ===
The death of the king's sister-in-law, the duchesse d'Orléans, had been falsely attributed to poison, and the crimes of Madame de Brinvilliers (executed in 1676) and her accomplices were still fresh in the public mind. At the same time, a riot took place during which people accused witches of abducting children for the black masses, and priests reported that a growing number of people were confessing to poisoning in their confessions.

In 1677, the fortune teller Magdelaine de La Grange was arrested for poisoning and claimed that she had information about crimes of high importance The arrest of the successful fortune tellers and poisoners Marie Bosse and Marie Vigoreaux in January 1679 made the police aware that there existed a network of fortune tellers in Paris who dealt in the distribution of poison.

On 12 March 1679, La Voisin was arrested outside Notre-Dame de Bonne-Nouvelle after attending mass, just before her planned meeting with Catherine Trianon. In April 1679, a commission appointed to inquire into the subject and to prosecute the offenders met for the first time. Its proceedings, including some suppressed in the official records, are preserved in the notes of one of the official court reporters, Gabriel Nicolas de la Reynie.

=== Investigation and trial ===
At the arrest of La Voisin, her maid Margot stated that the arrest would mean the end of a number of people at all levels of society. La Voisin was imprisoned at Vincennes, where she was subjected to questioning. On 27 December 1679, Louis XIV issued an order that the whole network should be exterminated by all methods, regardless of rank, sex, or age. The arrest of La Voisin was followed by the arrest of her daughter Marguerite Monvoisin, Guibourg, Lesage, Bertrand, Romani and the rest of her network of associates.

La Voisin was never subjected to torture. Although a formal order was issued permitting the use of torture, the order was not put in effect, and consequently, it was never made use of. The reason is suggested to have been the fear that she might reveal the names of influential people if she was questioned under torture. Aware of her alcoholism, however, her interrogators reportedly did not limit her access to alcohol but instead kept her in a state of drunkenness during her interrogations. Her confrontations with other accused, particularly Lesage and Bosse, were especially effective. Initially, she claimed to have referred all those clients wishing to buy poison to Bosse. In March, however, she named Marguerite Leféron and Francoise de Dreux as clients, and on 10 October, she admitted having sold poison and magical services to several members of the royal court. She also described the development of her career.

La Voisin denied ever meeting or serving Montespan. She did admit that "Paris is full of this kind of thing and there are an infinite number of people engaged in this evil trade," but refused to mention further clients, nor did she mention having arranged or participated in black masses. She once mentioned to the guards that the question she feared most was that they would ask her about her visits to the royal court. It is likely that she was referring to Montespan as her client and her attempt at murdering the king, and that she feared that such a confession should result in her execution for attempted regicide. Her list of clients, the arranging of the black masses, her connection to Montespan, and the murder attempt on the king were not revealed until after her death, when it was stated by her daughter and confirmed by the testimonies of her former associates.

She also denied claims of using her oven to burn the bones of aborted foetuses that were too large for the grave area in her garden. As well, she counterclaimed any usage of poisons, saying she only possessed purgatives for personal use or for her family. Another accusation she denied was injecting syringes with fatal liquids into the bodies of pregnant women to "empty" them, after which the aborted foetuses were allegedly buried in the garden grave.

=== Trial and execution ===
On 17 February 1680, La Voisin was put on trial, convicted of witchcraft, and sentenced to execution by burning two days later. In the days following her verdict, until her execution, it was said that she was formally interrogated under torture, with the official document stating she was tortured enough to beg for mercy. However, while an official permit for torture was issued, the authorities were given to understand that the permit was not to be used, and Gabriel Nicolas de la Reynie stated that La Voisin was in reality never subjected to torture. Madame de Sevigne, who observed La Voisin shortly before her execution, described her as being able to move so freely and so seemingly healthy that it did not seem possible for her to have been subjected to torture. These final interrogations did not reveal anything new.

La Voisin was executed in public on the Place de Grève in Paris on 22 February 1680. On her way to her execution, she reportedly pushed away the priest, and when fastened on the stake, she pushed away the hay which was piled up around her.

In July, her daughter Marguerite Monvoisin revealed her connection to Montespan, which was confirmed by the statements of the other accused. This caused the monarch to eventually close the investigation, seal the testimonies, and place the remaining accused outside of the public justice system by imprisoning them under a lettre de cachet.

== Depictions in media ==
=== Film ===
- Viviane Romance portrayed La Voisin in the 1955 film The Affair of Poisons.
- Anémone portrayed La Voisin in the 1997 film Marquise.
- La Voisin was the basis for the character portrayed by Suzanne Clément in the 2017 TV series Versailles.

=== Literature ===
- W. Branch Johnson: "'The Age Of Arsenic'. Being an account of the life, trial and execution of Catherine Montvoison, known as La Voison, and of her vile associates and credulous Clients of both high and low Degree: together with the Relation of their various Transactions in Poison, Abortion, and Black or Satanic Masses, with other Details concerning sundry Manners and Habits of the Times and with but little Moralising thereon: the Whole comprising a curious and momentous Episode in the Reign of King Louis XIV of France" (1932).
- She is also mentioned in Anne Rice's novel "The Vampire Lestat."
- The Hypnotist by Brad Steiger (1979)
- Judith Merkle Riley: The Oracle Glass (1994)
- Anne en Serge Golon: Angélique en de koning
- Shelby Mahurin: Serpent & Dove
- Danielle L. Jensen: Hidden Huntress
- Addie Thorley: An Affair of Poisons
- Lana Popovic: Poison Priestess
- Bram Stoker, 1910. "Famous Imposters", Chapter V. Witchcraft and Clairvoyance, Section C. La Voisin, Sidgwick & Jackson, Ltd: Adelphi, USA.Pg. 164 - 174

=== Manga ===
ボアザン (Boazan), by Takatoo Rui, is a manga partially based on La Voisin.

=== Music ===
Belgian black metal band Enthroned use La Voisin as the basis for the song "Graced by Evil Blood" on their 2002 album Carnage in Worlds Beyond.

== See also ==
- Giulia Tofana, another female poisoner, in Italy, only a decade before La Voisin
- Gironima Spana, another female manager of a net of female poisoners who were the central figure of another poison affair, the Spana Prosecution.
- Marie-Anne de La Ville; in October 1702, this person was arrested for having created a new organisation similar to the one of la Voisin, but because of Affair of the Poisons, she and her colleagues were never brought to trial, but imprisoned without trial on a lettre du cachet.
- Marie-Josephte Corriveau, a Canadian woman convicted of murder in 1763, later acquiring a legend and comparison to La Voisin.
- List of French serial killers
