= Christophe Moreau (shepherd) =

Christophe Moreau (died 1681), was a French shepherd and poisoner. He is known for his involvement in the Affair of the Poisons (1677-1682).

== Life ==
Christophe Moreau was working as a shepherd, but also produced and sold poison. During the Poison Affair, the poisoner Etienne Debray named Moreau as a colleague he had sometimes worked with.

Moreau stated that Jean Maillard and Chevalier de La Brosse (Jacques Pinon du Martroy) had expressed a wish to him to murder the king in order to free the imprisoned Fouquet, a statement that was coroborated by Étienne Guibourg.

Christophe Moreau was sentenced in 13 September 1681 to death for treason for conspiring to murder the king on his confession that he had been consulted by Maillard and then delivered the poison intended to murder the king to La Brosse.

On the day of execution, he retook his confession. He was executed by gibbeting, but the executioner was permitted to strangle him beforehand, which has been theorized as an attempt to prevent him from speaking.<refname=Somerset_370-372/>
