= Exili =

17th-century Italian chemist and poisoner

Exili (17th century) was an Italian chemist and poisoner. His real name was probably Nicolò Egidi.

Few authentic details of his life exist. Tradition, however, credits him with having been originally the salaried poisoner at Rome of Olympia Maidalchina, the sister-in-law of Pope Innocent X. Subsequently, he became a gentleman in waiting to Queen Christina of Sweden, whose taste for chemistry may have influenced this appointment.

In 1663 his presence in France aroused the suspicions of the French government, and he was imprisoned in the Bastille. Here he is said to have made the acquaintance of Godin de Sainte-Croix, the lover of the marquise de Brinvilliers. After three months of imprisonment, powerful influences secured Exili's release, and he left France for England. In 1681 he was again in Italy, where he married the countess Fantaguzzi, second cousin of Duke Francesco II of Modena.
