= Marie Vigoreaux =

French fortune teller and poisoner

Marie Vigoreaux, née Vaudon (circa 1639 – 6 May 1679), was a French fortune teller and poisoner. She was one of the key figures in the Affair of the Poisons.

Vigoreaux was married to the ladies' tailor Mathurin Vigoureux, and had herself been a wet nurse to several members of the aristocracy before she became a successful fortune teller who specialized in palm reading and performed at parties hosted by the nobility. In late 1678, Vigoreaux hosted the party where the lawyer Maitre Perrin heard Marie Bosse say that she was a professional poisoner. This led to the arrest of Vigoreaux and Bosse as well as Bosse's family on 4 January 1679. They were the first to be arrested in the actual Poison Affair, and their testimony led to the arrest of La Voisin and the exposure of her whole organisation. Marie Vigoreaux was proven to be closely linked to the Bosse family, as she was claimed to have had sexual relations with all of the family members. At the threat of additional torture, Vigoreaux and Bosse confessed to being poisoners and made a list of their customers and colleagues.

Vigoreaux implicated Marguerite de Poulaillon by naming her as her client: when Poulaillon expressed that she wished to be a widow, Vigoreaux had recommended her to Bosse. Adam Lesage claimed that Vigoreaux and her spouse had been commissioned by François-Henri de Montmorency, duc de Luxembourg to murder his wife and a business associate, and her husband later identified Montmorency in prison, though he later retracted his statement. Vigoreaux had also been commissioned by the Marquis de Feuquieres to make him untouchable in battle by the use of magic, and to murder someone who tried to prevent him from marrying.

4 May 1679, Vigoreaux and Bosse was sentenced to be tortured and burned to death. Marie Vigoreaux died during torture in a device designed to crush bones. Her husband was eventually released (in August 1682).

== In fiction ==
Marie Vigoreaux is portrayed in a novel by Judith Merkle Riley: The Oracle Glass (1994)
