= Magdelaine de La Grange =

French fortune teller involved in the Affair of the Poisons (c. 1641–1679)

- Born: 1641
- Died: 1679 (aged 37–38); France
- Occupation: Fortune teller

Magdelaine de La Grange (c. 1641–1679) was a French fortune-teller involved in the Affair of the Poisons (1677-1682). Her arrest in 1677 marked the opening of the official investigation. She appealed to François-Michel le Tellier, Marquis de Louvois claiming that she had information about other crimes of high importance. Louvois reported to the King, who told Gabriel Nicolas de la Reynie, who, among other things, was the chief of the Paris police, to root out the poisoners.

== Life and career ==
Magdelaine de La Grange worked as a fortune teller after the execution of her husband for receiving stolen goods. Her specialty was to reveal to clients who were worried about their health that they had been poisoned, and offer them antidotes. Since 1669, she lived in luxury at the expense of the rich lawyer Jean Faurye. On 17 August 1676, Magdelaine de La Grange and a man who introduced himself as Faurye appeared before a law clerk. The man said that they were married, and had a will issued to the benefit of his spouse, Magdelaine de La Grange. Shortly after, Jean Faurye died, and his family reported the matter. The marriage certificate proved to be a forgery issued by Abbé Nail, who had appeared as Faurye at the law clerk's office. After having established a link between her and Louis de Vanens, the case convinced Gabriel Nicolas de la Reynie that there existed a network of poisoners in Paris, and de La Grange and Nial were kept without trial for months for questioning. She never revealed anything of real importance, however, and after the arrest of Marie Bosse in 1679, the trial against her was allowed to proceed.

Magdelaine de La Grange and Abbé Nail were sentenced to death for forgery and murder on 4 February 1679, and four days later they were hanged.

== Bibliography ==
- Anne Somerset - The Affair of the Poisons: Murder, Infanticide, and Satanism at the Court of Louis XIV (St. Martin's Press (October 12, 2003) ISBN 0-312-33017-0)
