= Françoise Filastre =

French occultist

Françoise Filastre, also known as La Filastre (1645–1680), was a French poisoner and occultist, one of the many involved in l'affaire des Poisons. In her testimony she named the king's mistress, Madame de Montespan as another participant in the scandal.

She first came to police attention in 1677 as a practician of occult magic with renegade priests, Jacques Cotton, associated with Louis de Vanens, and La Voisin. and provided aphrodisiac on her orders for Madame de Montespan, who used it to drug Louis XIV. In 1679, Montespan hired La Voisin to murder the monarch and his latest love interest Marie-Angelique, Duchesse de Fontanges. When the plans failed due to the arrest of La Voisin, Montespan hired Filastre to perform the murder on Fontanges. She was arrested in December 1679, after having applied for a position in the household of Fontanges.

In August 1680, after the execution of La Voisin in February, the connection between La Voisin and Montespan and the plan to assassinate the king was revealed by her daughter Marguerite Monvoisin, who on 9 October also confirmed the August statements by Adam Lesage of child sacrifice at the black masses. On 30 September the Chambre Ardente, acting on the evidence given, condemned Filastre to death, before which she was to be subjected to further intensive interrogation of "the extraordinary question". On 31 September she confirmed her participation in a Black Mass, and stated that others, not yet tried or convicted, had performed spells for Montespan. Under torture the next day, she then claimed that Montespan had wanted Fontanges poisoned, which was why she had attempted to gain employment with the duchess. After being taken back to her cell, Filastre requested an interview with La Reynie, chief of police, in which she recanted her previous testimony, saying she wanted end the pain, but that she did not want to die with a lie on her conscience.

She was burnt to death at the Place de Greve in Paris on 1 October alongside her accomplice Jacques Cotton.

To prevent Filastre's testimony being read aloud in court, Louis XIV suspended public hearings of the Chambre Ardente.
