= Magdelaine Chapelain =

Magdelaine Chapelain (1651 – June 1724; also spelled Madeleine Chappelain) was a French fortune teller and poisoner. She was a defendant in the famous Affair of the Poisons.

Chapelain was a very successful fortune teller who had secured a fortune at her work. She had acquired her spouse, a former usher with a position as bureaucrat, and she also owned several buildings. In connection to the Poison Affair, she was implicated because she had formerly employed Françoise Filastre as a maid. Filastre was arrested upon her return from a trip to Auvergne (province) which had been paid for by Chapelin in December 1679. Chapelain was also connected to Louis de Vanens, to whom she had rented a house.

Adam Lesage claimed that Chapelain made her fortune by manufacturing poisons and performing black magic in collaboration with a man by the name of Boucher, and Filastre claimed that she had on occasion supplied Chapelain with poison so that she could sell it, that Chapelain had commissioned her to help her form a pact with Satan, and that Chapelain also performed curses and other magical services for her clients. Filastre claimed, that it was Chapelain who had been commissioned by Madame de Montespan to place an assassin (Filastre) in the household of Angelique de Fontanges.

Like many others involved with the Affair of the Poisons, Magdelaine Chapelain never had a trial. She was imprisoned in perpetuity by a Lettre de cachet at Belle-Île-en-Mer. According to Frantz Funck-Brentano, she was imprisoned in Villefranche-de-Conflent, in Fort Libéria. The exact date of death is not known for many of the accused, but of the prisoners whose year of death is known, Magdelaine Chapelain's death in June 1724 was the last recorded.
