= Marie-Anne de La Ville =

French fortune teller (1680–1725)

Marie-Anne de La Ville (1680–1725) was a French fortune teller and occultist.

La Ville managed a successful business with clients from powerful parts of society. She performed various alleged magical acts for money, and her business has been compared to that of La Voisin, whose net of occultists was dissolved in 1679. Among her clients were Madame de Grancey, an acquaintance of Philippe II, Duke of Orléans, and the marquis de Feuquieres, previously the client of La Voisin, who reportedly hired her to summon a demon by the name of Prince Babel.

La Ville was arrested in a great raid against the occultists of Paris in October 1702. This raid had been made after general lieutenant Marc-René de Voyer de Paulmy d'Argenson (1652–1721), had warned that the religion in the capital was endangered because of a growing professional class of occultists. Professional occultism and fortune telling had in fact been banned since the Affair of the Poisons of 1677-82. Already in 1696, six years before, a professional female fortune teller had been arrested for black magic, although the case was never brought to trial since it was discovered that the Duke of Chartres and the marquis de Feuquieres were among her clients.

The case of Marie-Anne de La Ville bore similarities to that of La Voisin; except for de La Ville herself, her colleagues and members of her organisation included Jemme, who arranged devils pacts; Bendrode, who claimed to know the secret of the Philosophers' Stone; and the priest Pere Robert who is reported to have performed black masses. Another similarity was the high positions clients of the organisation, which were in certain cases even the former clients of la Voisin.

However, since the Poison Affair of La Voisin, the authorities were not willing to conduct another such case, because of the great damage the Poison Affair was considered to have caused to the reputation of France abroad. Because of this, d'Argenson recommended that the case of Marie-Anne de La Ville and her organisation of her colleagues were not to be brought to trial, and that instead, the arrested should be imprisoned without a trial by a lettre de cachet, in the same manner as the accused in the Poison Affair eventually had.
