= François Mariotte =

French priest and occultist

François Mariotte (floruit 1682), was a French priest. He is known for his involvement in the Affair of the Poisons (1677-1682).

== Life ==
François Mariotte was born in a wealthy family with contacts in the nobility. He was initiated in the presthood, became an abbé and are described as a beautiful man with black hair and very pale skin.

Between 1667 and 1668, Mariotte was a business companion to the sorcerer Adam Lesage in Paris. During this period, Mariotte participated in black masses arranged by Lesage for wealthy clients, were Mariotte officiated in hs capacity of a priest, during he was alleged to have participated in the sacrifice of children to the Devil.

It was François Mariotte who officiated at the famous black mass arranged by Catherine Monvoisin in 1667, during which Madame de Montespan prayed to the Devil that king Louis XIV should abandon Louise de La Valliere and make her his mistress, something that did hapen that same year.

In 1668 François Mariotte and Adam Lesage were both arrested and prosecuted for witchcraft for having participated in black masses. Because of the influential and well connected family of Mariotte, however, the case was toned down in as high degree as possible and they were only prosecuted and sentenced for the few things that could not be denied in court. While Adam Lesage was condemned to galley slavery, Mariotte was given a different sentence due to his family and his status as a priest. He was imprisoned at the Saint-Lazare, but eskaped and was able to continue his activity.

During the Poison Affair, Mariotte was arrested in Toulouse in February 1680. In November 1680 he was interrogated about the involvement of Madame de Montespan in the Poison Affair. His testimony contributed to him being included in the people who were removed from any legal prosecution in 1682 and imprisoned by a lettre de cachet. He died imprisoned in Vincennes.
