= Affair of the Poisons =

17th century murder scandal in France

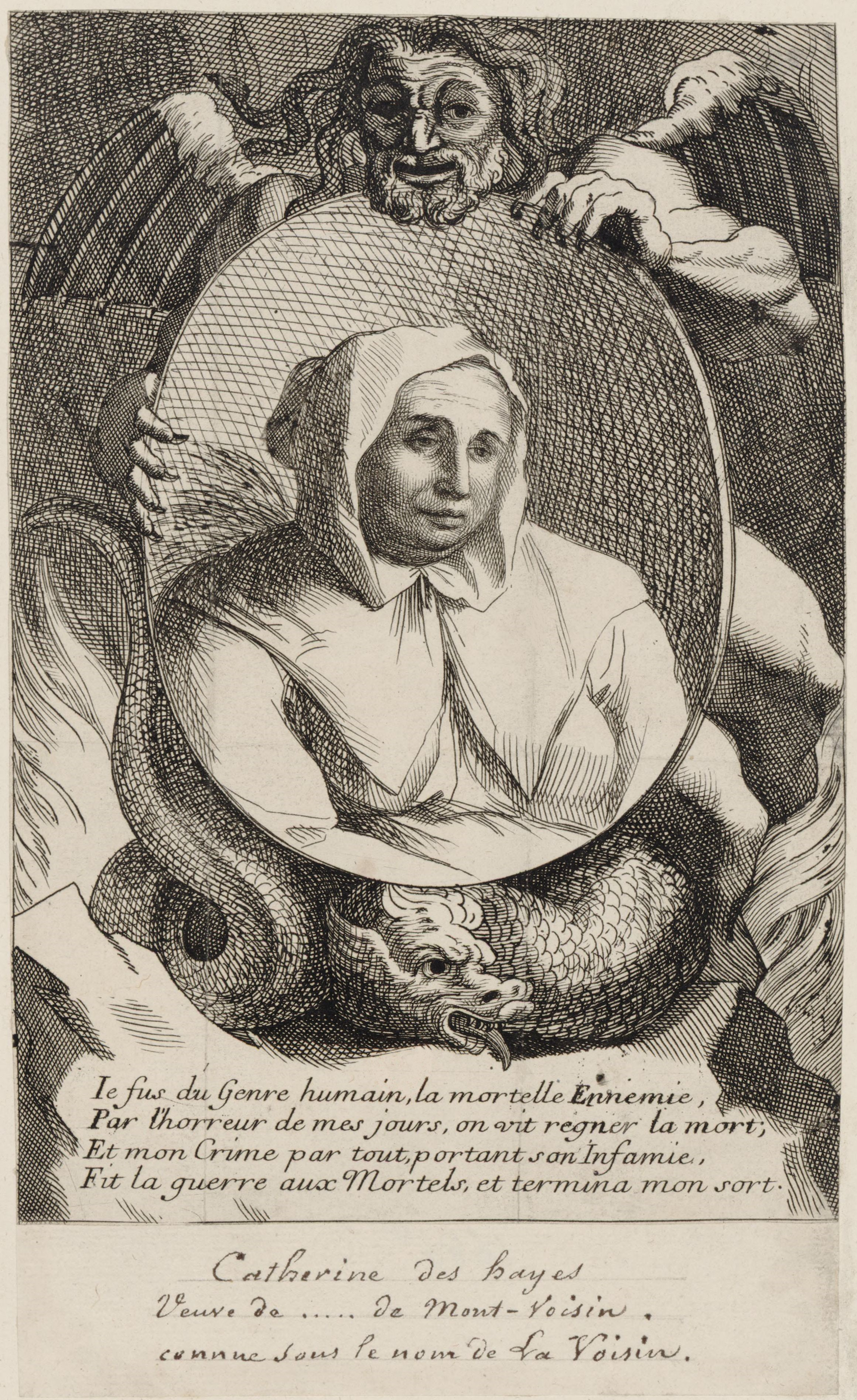
Catherine Deshayes, "La Voisin", 17th-century print of her portrait held by a winged devil

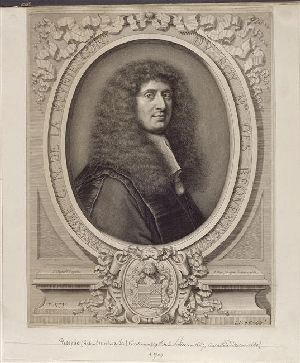
Gabriel Nicolas de la Reynie (1625–1709), 17th century print by Mignard

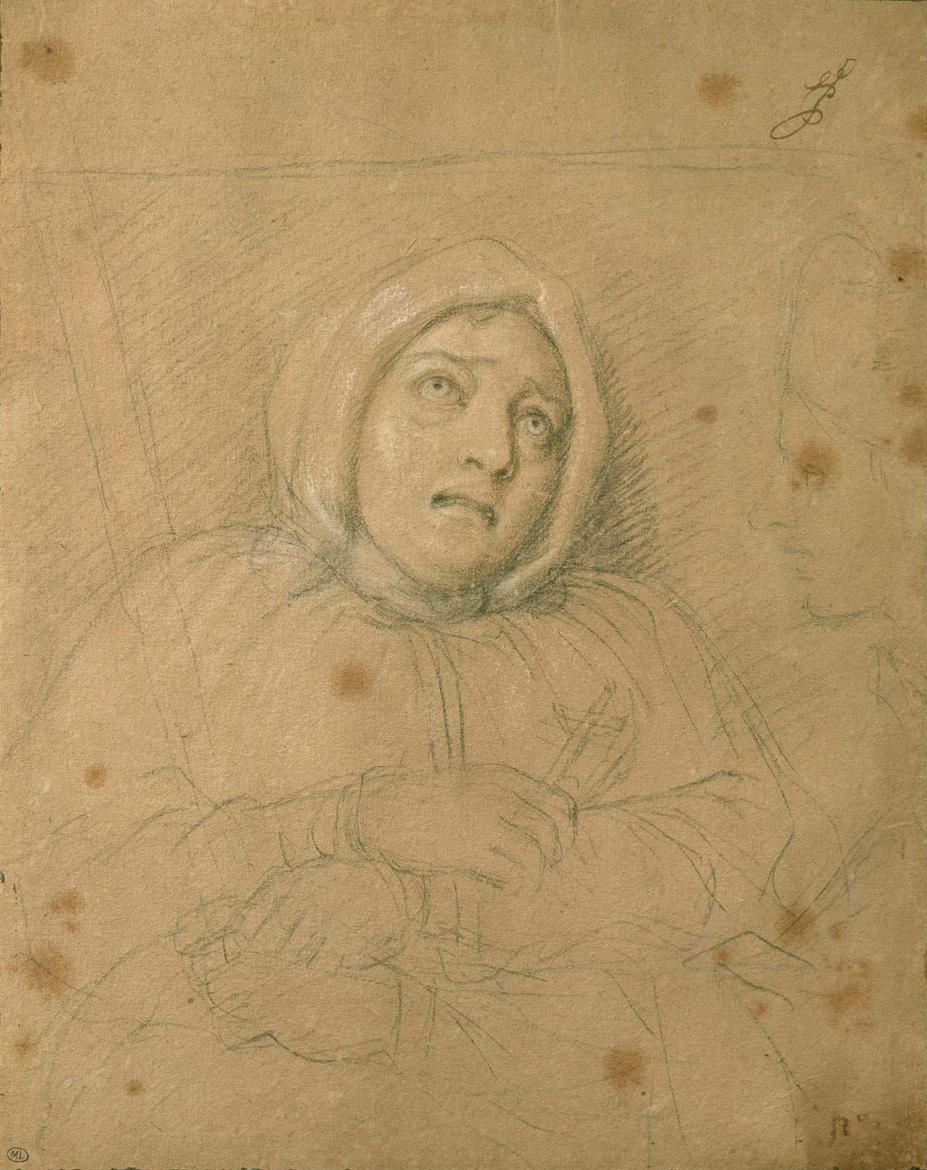
Marie Madeleine Marguerite d'Aubray, Marquise of Brinvilliers, 1676, after her imprisonment, portrait by Charles LeBrun

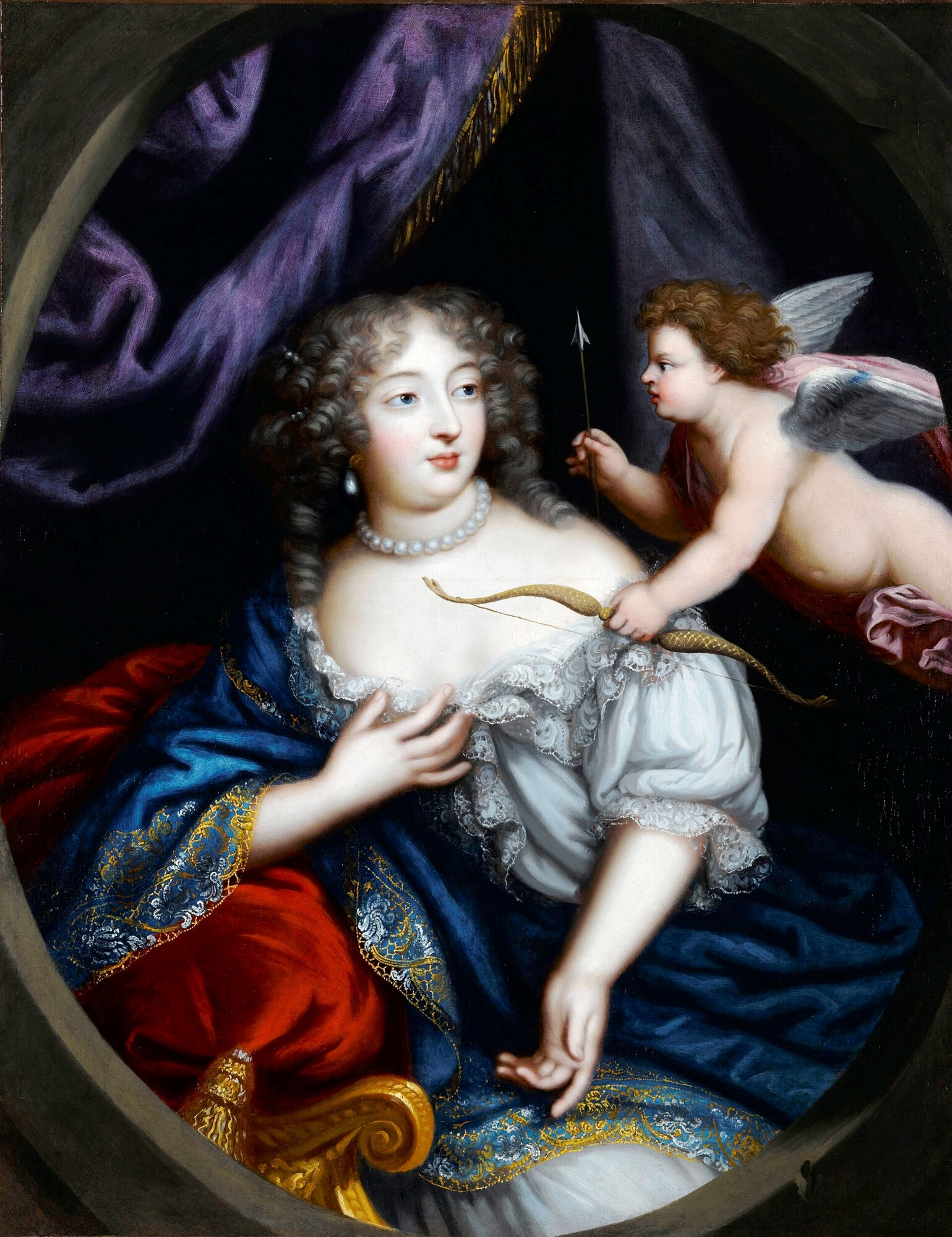
Madame de Montespan

The Affair of the Poisons (French: affaire des poisons, pronounced [afɛʁ de pwazɔ̃]) was a major murder scandal in France during the reign of King Louis XIV. Between 1677 and 1682, a number of prominent members of the aristocracy were implicated and sentenced on charges of poisoning and witchcraft. The scandal reached into the inner circle of the King. It led to the execution of 36 people.

== Context and origin ==
In 1672, upon the natural death of cavalry officer Godin de Sainte-Croix, an inventory of his papers revealed a box containing nine letters from his mistress, the Marquise de Brinvilliers, as well as the marquise's acknowledgment of a debt amounting to 30,000 livres. This box also contained various vials which, after being analyzed by an apothecary, were found to have contained various poisons that left little trace in the body.

The case began in 1675 after the trial of de Brinvilliers, who was accused of having conspired with de Sainte-Croix to poison her father Antoine Dreux d'Aubray in 1666, and two of her brothers, Antoine d'Aubray and François d'Aubray, in 1670, in order to inherit their estates. There were also rumours that she had poisoned poor people during her visits to hospitals.

After being accused, she fled but was arrested in Liège. De Brinvilliers was tortured and confessed, was sentenced to death, and on 17 July was tortured with the water cure (forced to drink sixteen pints of water) and then beheaded, and her body burned at the stake. Her alleged accomplice Sainte-Croix did not face charges because he had died of natural causes in 1672.

The sensational trial drew attention to other mysterious deaths, starting rumours. Prominent people, including Louis XIV, became alarmed that they might be poisoned.

== Implications and investigation ==
The affair proper opened in February 1677 after the arrest of Magdelaine de La Grange on charges of forgery and murder. La Grange appealed to François Michel Le Tellier, Marquis of Louvois, claiming that she had information about other crimes of high importance. Louvois reported to the King, who told Gabriel Nicolas de la Reynie, who, among other things, was the chief of the Paris police, to root out the poisoners. La Reynie sought to calm the King. The subsequent investigation of potential poisoners led to accusations of witchcraft, murder and more.

Authorities rounded up a number of fortune tellers and alchemists who were suspected of selling not only divinations, séances and aphrodisiacs, but also "inheritance powders" (a euphemism for poison). Some of them confessed under torture and gave authorities lists of their clients, who had allegedly bought poison to get rid of their spouses or rivals in the royal court.

The most famous case was that of the midwife Catherine Deshayes Monvoisin or La Voisin, who was arrested in 1679 after she was incriminated by the poisoner Marie Bosse. La Voisin implicated several important courtiers. These included Olympia Mancini, the Countess of Soissons, her sister, the Duchess of Bouillon, François Henri de Montmorency, Duke of Luxembourg and, most importantly, the King's mistress, Madame de Montespan.

Questioned while intoxicated, La Voisin claimed that Montespan had bought aphrodisiacs and performed black masses with her in order to gain and keep the King's favour over rival lovers. She had worked with a priest named Étienne Guibourg. There was no evidence beyond her confessions, but bad reputations followed these people afterwards. Eleanor Herman, in her book Sex with Kings (2009), claims that the police, given reports of "babies' bones", uncovered the remains of 2,500 infants in La Voisin's garden. However, Anne Somerset disputes this in her book The Affair of the Poisons (2003) and states there is no mention of the garden being searched for human remains.

Also involved in the scandal was Eustache Dauger de Cavoye, the eldest living scion of a prominent noble family. Cavoye was disinherited by his family when, in an act of debauchery, he chose to celebrate Good Friday with a black mass. Upon his disinheritance, he opened a lucrative trade in "inheritance powders" and aphrodisiacs. He mysteriously disappeared after the abrupt ending of Louis's official investigation in 1678. Because of this and his name, he was once suspected of being the Man in the Iron Mask. However, this theory has fallen out of favour because it is now known that he was imprisoned by his family in 1679 in the Prison Saint-Lazare.

== The end of the trial ==
La Voisin was sentenced to death for witchcraft and poisoning, and burned at the stake on 22 February 1680. Marshal Montmorency-Bouteville was briefly jailed in 1680, but was later released and became a captain of the guard. Minister Jean-Baptiste Colbert helped to hush things up.

De La Reynie re-established the special court, the Chambre Ardente ("burning court"), to judge cases of poisoning and witchcraft. It investigated a number of cases, including many connected to nobles and courtiers in the king's court. Over the years, the court sentenced 34 people to death for poisoning or witchcraft. Two died under torture and several courtiers were exiled. The court was abolished in 1682, because the king could not risk the publicity of such a scandal. To this, police chief Reynie said "the enormity of their crimes proved their safeguard."

== Aftermath ==
Perhaps the most important consequence of the scandal and subsequent persecutions was the expulsion of the Countess of Soissons from France and its effect on her son Eugene. He remained in France, only to find that his mother's high-profile disgrace prevented him from realising his personal ambitions, as he was effectively barred from pursuing a military career.

Eugene eventually left France, after opposing Louis XIV, and entered the service of France's enemies, the Habsburgs. Prince Eugene of Savoy would become one of the most experienced generals of that time and one of the factors behind the failure of Louis's hegemony in Europe.

== Suspects and sentences ==
The Poison Affair implicated 442 suspects: 367 orders of arrests were issued, of which 218 were carried out. Of the condemned, 36 were executed; five were sentenced to the galleys and 23 to exile. This excludes those who died in custody by torture or suicide. Additionally, many accused were never brought to trial, but placed outside of the justice system and imprisoned for life by a lettre de cachet.

Of the people who were condemned to perpetual imprisonment by lettre de cachet, six women were imprisoned at Château de Villefranche; 18 men at Château de Salces; 12 women at Belle-Île-en-Mer; ten men at Château de Besançon; 14 women at St André de Salins; and five women at Fort-les-Bains.

=== Non-clients ===
This lists those people of the Poison Affair who were sentenced or punished without verdict for having been professionally involved in criminal activity as poisoners or occultists or in other ways associated with the organization of La Voisin. Their punishment is mentioned after their name and role.

The fate of non-clients in the Poison Affair
Name	Role	Punishment/Fate
Roger, Siegneur de Bachimont	alchemist, associate of Louis de Vanens	perpetual imprisonment by lettre de cachet at St. André de Salins
Marie de Bachimont	alchemist, associate of Louis de Vanens, spouse of Roger de Bachimont	perpetual imprisonment by lettre de cachet at St. André de Salins.
Mathurin Barenton	poisoner	executed in September 1681
La Belliére, Madame	fortune teller	perpetual imprisonment by lettre de cachet
François Belot	Member of the royal guard, poisoner, associate of La Bosse	executed in June 1679
Martine Bergerot	fortune teller	
Bertrand, Monsieur	poisoner, associate of La Voisin and Romain	perpetual imprisonment by lettre de cachet at Château de Salces
Denis Poculot, Sieur de Blessis	alchemist, lover of La Voisin	condemned to the galleys
Marie Bosse	fortune teller, poisoner	burned at the stake 8 May 1679
Marie Bouffet	abortion care provider, associate of Marguerite Joly	hanged in December 1681
Pierre Cadelan	associate of Vanens	perpetual imprisonment by lettre de cachet (d. September 1684)
Jeanne Chanfrain	lover of Guibourg, provider of child sacrifices for black masses	executed in 1681
Magdelaine Chapelain	fortune teller, associate of Filastre	perpetual imprisonment by lettre de cachet at Belle-Île-en-Mer (1658-d. June 1724); the last condemned to die, of those whose date of death is known
Anne Cheron (fruit seller)	poisoner, associate of La Bosse	executed in June 1679
Jacques Cotton	priest and officiate at black masses, associate of La Voisin	executed by burning in 1680
P. Dalmas, Monsieur	alchemist and poisoner, associate of La Chaboissiere	sent to a workhouse.
Gilles Davot	priest and officiate at black masses, associate of La Voisin	executed in 1681
Etienne Debray	poisoner, associate of Deschault	executed in September 1681
Marguerite Delaporte	poisoner, associate of La Voisin	perpetual imprisonment by lettre de cachet at Belle-Île-en-Mer
Jacques Deschault (shepherd)	magician and poison producer	executed in 1681
La Deslauriers, Madame	poisoner	
Louison Desloges	associate of Marguerite Joly	hanged in December 1681
Perrette Dodée, "La Dodée"	poisoner	committed suicide in prison
Louise Dusoulcye	poisoner, lover of Dalmas	
Françoise Filastre	poisoner	executed in 1680
La Jacob, Madame	fortune teller	associate of La Voisin
Philippe Galet	poison producer	perpetual imprisonment by lettre de cachet at Château de Besançon
Anne Guesdon, Mme Guesdon	poisoner, associate of Godin de Sainte-Croix and Madame de Brinvilliers	perpetual imprisonment by lettre de cachet at Villefranche (1640–d. 15 August 1717)
Étienne Guibourg	priest and officiate at the black masses, associate of La Voisin	perpetual imprisonment by lettre de cachet at Château de Besançon
La Hebert, Madame	lotion producer for La Voisin	
Marguerite Joly	fortune teller, poisoner	executed by burning in December 1681
Latour (stonemason)	magician and poison producer, associate of la Voisin	perpetual imprisonment by lettre de cachet at Château de Salces
Catherine Lepère	abortion care provider	executed in June 1679
Adam Lesage	magician, officiate at black masses, associate of La Voisin	perpetual imprisonment by lettre de cachet at Château de Besançon
Catherine Leroy	associate of La Voisin and la Chaboissiere	perpetual imprisonment by lettre de cachet at Belle-Île-en-Mer
Jeanne Leroux	associate of La Chaboissere and Le Vanens	executed in April 1680
Margot (servant of la Voisin)		perpetual imprisonment by lettre de cachet at St. André de Salins
François Mariotte (abbe)	priest and officiate and black masses, associate of la Voisin and Lesage	died in prison in 1682
Anne Meline	poisoner, associate of Marguerite Joly	hanged in December 1681
François Boucher, Vicomte de Montemayor	astrologer of the Duke de Luxembourg	perpetual imprisonment by lettre de cachet at Château de Salces
Marguerite Monvoisin	daughter of La Voisin	perpetual imprisonment by lettre de cachet at Belle-Île-en-Mer
Christophe Moreau (shepherd)	magician, poisoner and poison producer	executed in September 1681
Romani	poisoner, associate of La Voisin	perpetual imprisonment by lettre de cachet at Château de Besançon
La Pelletier, Madame	fortune teller and love potion producer, provider of child sacrifices, associate of La Voisin	perpetual imprisonment by lettre de cachet at Belle-Île-en-Mer
Maitre Pierre	poisoner producer	perpetual imprisonment by lettre de cachet
Anne Poligny	poisoner	executed in July 1681
La Poignard, Madame	provided a child sacrifice for a black mass	perpetual imprisonment by lettre de cachet
La Poulain, Madame	associate of La Voisin	perpetual imprisonment by lettre de cachet at Belle-Île-en-Mer
Catherine Trianon	astrologer, poisoner, associate of La Voisin	committed suicide in prison in early 1681
La Salomond, Madame	poisoner	perpetual imprisonment by lettre de cachet
Denise Sandosme	poisoner	executed by hanging in July 1681
Louis de Vanens	alchemist	perpetual imprisonment by lettre de cachet at St. André de Salins, (d. December 1691)
Monsieur and Madame Marie Vautier	poison producers of la Voisin	perpetual imprisonment by lettre de cachet
Marie Vigoreaux, née Vaudon	poisoner, associate of La Bosse	died under torture in May 1679
La Voisin	fortune teller, poisoner	burned at the stake 22 February 1680
Jean Bartholominat, La Chaboissiere	poison producer, poisoner, valet of Louis de Vanens	the last executed in the Affair of the Poisons 16 July 1682

=== Clients ===
This lists people involved in the Poison Affair by being clients of the professionals above. Their punishment is mentioned after their name and role.

The fate of clients in the Poison Affair
Name	Appointee	Punishment/Fate
Benigne de Meaux de Fouilloux, Marquise d'Alluye	La Voisin	fled country to avoid trial; was later allowed to return
Pierre Bonnard, secretary of duc de Luxembourg	Lesage	condemned to the galleys in May 1680
Marie Brissart	La Voisin and Lesage	fined and exiled
Marie de Broglio, Marquise de Canilhac	La Voisin	never brought to trial
Anne Carada	Deschault and Debray	executed 25 June 1681
Louis de Guilhem de Castelnau, marquis de Cessac	Lesage	fled country to avoid trial; returned in 1691
Mme Cottard	Lesage	admonished and fined
Mme Desmaretz	Lesage	fined
Françoise de Dreux	La Voisin	exiled from the capital, but the exile was never enforced
Madeleine d’Angennes, Marechale de la Ferté (d. 1720)	La Voisin	discharged
Antoine de Pas, Marquis de Feuquieres (d. 1711)	La Voisin	never brought to trial
Marie, Madame Ferry	La Voisin	executed in May 1679
Marguerite Leféron	La Voisin	exiled from the capital and fined
Mme Lescalopier	Poligny and Sandosme	left country to avoid trial, executed in absentia 16 July 1681
Jean Maillard	Moreau	executed in February 1682
Olympe Mancini, Comtesse de Soissons	La Voisin	exiled
Marie Anne Mancini, Duchesse de Bouillon	La Voisin	banishment to the provinces
François Henri de Montmorency-Bouteville, duc de Luxembourg	La Voisin	freed
Marquise de Montespan	La Voisin	never tried
Catherine Philbert, Madame Brunet	La Voisin	hanged
Jacqueline du Roure, vicomtesse de Polignac (d. 1720)	La Voisin and Lesage	fled country to avoid trial; returned 1686 but banished from the capital
Marguerite de Poulaillon	Marie Bosse	imprisoned in a convent
Claude Marie d'Artigny, comtesse du Roure	La Voisin and Lesage	discharged in March 1680, but banished from the capital
Marie Louise Charlotte, Princesse de Tingry	La Voisin	discharged
Marie Vertemart	La Voisin	sentenced to a workhouse
Antoinette de Mesmes, duchesse de Vivonne	La Voisin and Filastre	never brought to trial

== Similar incidents ==
In October 1702, Marie-Anne de La Ville was arrested for having created a new organisation similar to the one of la Voisin, but because of the Affair of the Poisons, she and her colleagues were never brought to trial, but imprisoned without trial on a lettre de cachet.

== In popular culture ==
In 1907 French writer Victorien Sardou produced a play The Affair of the Poisons. This later provided the basis for a 1955 film adaptation of the same title directed by Henri Decoin. Marjorie Bowen's 1936 novel The Poisoners also revolves around the incident.

The organisation of La Voisin and the Affair of the Poisons is portrayed in a novel by Judith Merkle Riley: The Oracle Glass (1994).

The Affair of the Poisons is the leading thread throughout the second season of the French-Canadian TV series Versailles. The series shows the courtiers being intoxicated with the powders and potions; even Madame de Montespan is portrayed as having a major role in the poisonings. In the fictionalization, La Voisin was altered to the character Agathe.

Scottish speed metal artist Hellripper's 2020 album titled The Affair of The Poisons contains lyrical themes based on the scandal.

Melissa Bonny wrote "See You in Hell" for Ad Infinitum's 2020 album Chapter I: Monarchy inspired by this event.

== See also ==
- Spana Prosecution
- Angel Makers of Nagyrév
