= Adam Lesage =

French occultist and alleged sorcerer

- Born: Adam Cœuret; Venoix, French
- Died: Unknown, French
- Other name: Dubuisson
- Occupations: Occultist, Sorcerer
- Known for: Involvement in the Poison Affair
- Criminal charges: Sorcery, Black Mass, Child Sacrifice
- Criminal penalty: Imprisoned for life
- Partner: La Voisin

Adam Lesage (né Cœuret, also called Dubuisson; fl. April 1683) was a French professional occultist and alleged sorcerer. He was one of the chief accused in the Affair of the Poisons.

== Career ==
Lesage came from Venoix near Caen and was originally a wool trader. He later moved to Paris and was there employed in the organisation of La Voisin, an organisation of occultists who also provided poisons, with the task to perform alleged magical rituals.

In 1667 he officiated alongside abbé Francois Mariette in a black mass, arranged by La Voisin for Madame de Montespan, in which Montespan she prayed to the Devil for the King to love her and to marry her and cast aside Louise de la Valliere and the queen. In 1668, Adam Lesage and Francois Mariotte were arrested on suscipsion of having arranged a Black mass, and were both charged with witchcraft. With the help of the influential family of Francois Mariotte, most of the charges were dropped and they were only condemned for the little information that could not be denied, which resulted in Mariotte, as a priest, being banished to a monastery (from which he soon escaped) and Adam Lesage being condemned to the Galleys. Lesage was freed in 1672 by the connections of La Voisin, and resumed his position in her organisation.

Lesage was the lover of La Voisin, and despite being already married, he promised to marry her if she became a widow, and persuaded her to kill her husband. She initially agreed, but changed her mind before the murder was completed and forced Lesage to abort the whole plan. Lesage's main task in the organisation was to perform magic for the customers. His most common task was to post wishes to the Devil. He asked the client to write down their wish on a piece of paper, which he embedded in a ball of wax, and then burned. Some time later, he retrieved the ball from the flames and claimed that the Devil had read it.

== Arrest and confession ==
Adam Lesage was arrested 22 May 1679 as a part of the network of La Voisin during the Poison Affair in 1679. He was arrested alongside abbé Mariotte on the order of the monarch himself, charged with having officiated at black masses. He confessed to having performed magical tasks for the organisation, but stated that they had all been cons, and that he had fooled his colleagues as well as the clients.

In July–August 1680, after the execution of La Voisin on 22 February, her daughter Marguerite Monvoisin, made a full confession, revealing the client list of her mother, which included the king's mistress Madame de Montespan, and the aphrodisiacs, black masses and murder of the king ordered by Montespan. Minister Louvois now promised Lesage his freedom if he made a complete confession. The confession made by Lesage on 26 September 1680 confirmed the statement made by Marguerite Monvoisin, but it also included claims that the black masses, which were regularly attended by the ladies of the royal court, had included child sacrifice. His statement was considered so horrifying that it was not accepted as truth, but then on 30 September - 1 October, his statement about child sacrifice, as well as the statements of Montespan, were confirmed by the confession of Francoise Filastre.

Already on 1 October, it was reported to Louis XIV, who ordered the entire process to be closed. The sittings of the Chambre Ardente were suspended until 19 May 1681, and finally closed on 21 July 1682. The 9 October, Marguerite Monvoisin confirmed that the black masses had included child sacrifice, and on 10 October, it was confirmed by Étienne Guibourg. In November, Montespan was further implicated when her chamber lady, Claude de Vin des Œillets, was identified by the prisoners.

== Later life ==
Adam Lesage, Étienne Guibourg, Marguerite Monvoisin and a number of others involved were never brought to trial, which would have made their testimonies public. Instead, their confessions were sealed, and they were imprisoned for life by lettre de cachet. Lesage, together with Guibourg, Louis Galet and Romani, were imprisoned at the Chateau de Besancon, while Marguerite Monvoison, together with La Pelletiere, La Poulain, La Delaporte and Catherine Leroy were incarcerated at Belle-Île-en-Mer. In April 1683, Lesage indicated to the governor of Besancon that he had information about a plot toward the monarch. Louvois recommended that he be put on water and bread and beaten day and night to make him talk, but that he was a habitual liar. His date of death is unknown.

== In fiction ==
He is portrayed in a novel by Judith Merkle Riley: The Oracle Glass (1994). Also more recently in "The City of Crows" by Chris Womersley (2017).
