= Gabriel Nicolas de la Reynie =

French magistrate (1625–1709)

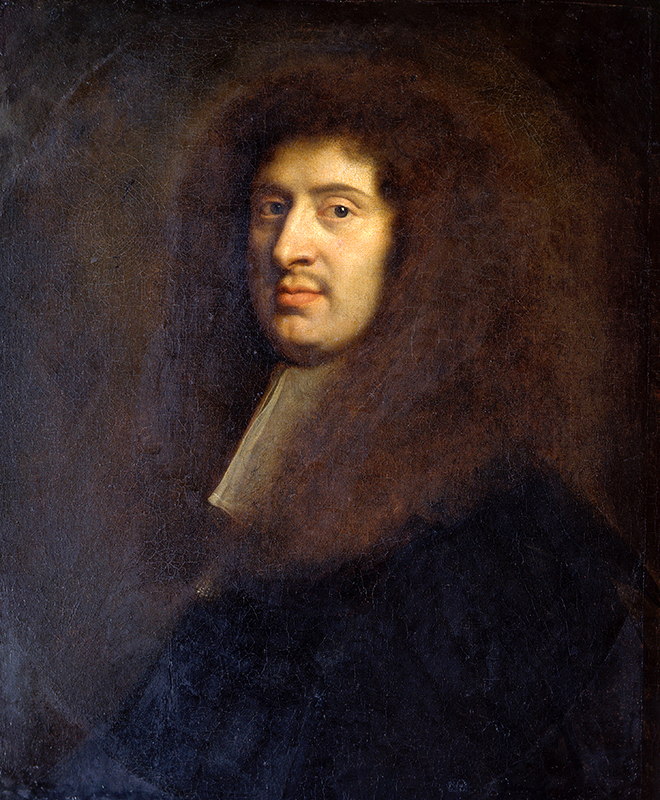
- Portrait of Gabriel Nicolas de la Reynie by Pierre Mignard

Lieutenant General of Police of Paris
- In office March 1667 – January 1697
- Preceded by: Position established
- Succeeded by: Marquis d'Argenson

Personal details
- Born: 1625 Limoges, France
- Died: 1709 (aged 83–84) Paris, France

Gabriel Nicolas de la Reynie (pronounced [ɡabʁijɛl nikɔla də la ʁɛni]; 1625 – 14 June 1709) was a French magistrate who served as the first Lieutenant General of Police of Paris from 1667 to 1697. He is considered to be the founder of the first modern police force.

== Early career ==
Born in 1625 in Limoges, France to a poor family, Gabriel Nicolas made a wealthy marriage in 1645 and took the name of Reynie, a minor lordship with an annual income of 200 pounds. Only one of his children lived to adulthood, and his wife died three years later. He became a magistrate at Angoulême, then president of the court at Bordeaux. He avoided entanglement in the Fronde (the last rebellion carried out by the nobles of France against the King) and acted as intendant to the governor of Guyenne, Jean Louis de Nogaret de La Valette, Duke of Épernon, who introduced him to court. In 1661, he bought for 320 000 pounds the office of Maître des requêtes to the King's Council.

== Lieutenant General of Police ==
Jean-Baptiste Colbert, minister to the King, inaugurated the new office of Lieutenant General of Police of Paris in 1667. The edict which Colbert presented to Louis XIV in March 1667 resulted from several centuries' evolution of French attitudes towards public safety. He envisioned a complete solution to crime; from a situation inherited from the Middle Ages, he distilled the foundations of the modern police force under the Ancien Régime. The purpose of the office of Lieutenant General of Police was to create an autonomous force to take care of the nicer areas of the city, and curb the growth of the Cour des miracles. Paris was the first city to take such measures. Originally concerned mainly with requests from the Council of State, the position had complete authority over existing institutions of law enforcement and civil protection. In particular, the Lieutenant General of Police supported the various governmental bureaus (trades, markets, schools, archives, etc.). Appointed by the king, the office of Lieutenant General of Police is revocable ad nutum (at will).

Nicolas de la Reynie was the first Lieutenant General of the Paris police, an office which he held from March 1667 to January 1697. His views on law enforcement were advanced, and form the basis for modern police forces today. "Policing consists in ensuring the safety of the public and of private individuals, by protecting the city from that which causes disorder." Reynie vigorously suppressed the printing and sale of seditious writings, crimes which he judged himself directly (and very severely).

== Accomplishments ==
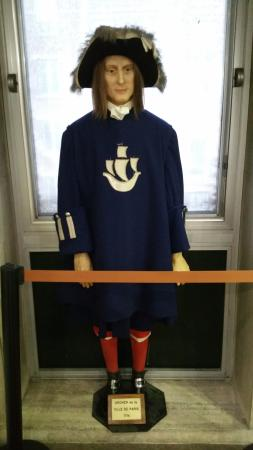
"Archer" of the City of Paris, at the turn of the XVIII century

While the edict conferred on Reynie certain responsibilities it allowed him the freedom to organize his administration by gathering under its authority the old institutions. At that time, four "police forces" competed within Paris: police chiefs, archers and freemen of the guet royal (royal watch), the company of the criminal lieutenant, and the Provost of the city. De la Reynie reorganized these forces and took them under his wing. They were charged with ensuring the safety of the streets of Paris and supervising the environs of Paris. In addition to this, Reynie re-established royal authority in place of the Governor of Paris, those who held fiefdoms within Paris, and the Parlement, which had until then dealt with police, commercial, and municipal regulation. The result represented a significant improvement in law enforcement.

The chief inspectors in the Châtelet became Police Chiefs of the force and were increased in number to 48. Distributed between the 17 districts of Paris, they gave a daily account of their activity to the General Lieutenant. Nicolas de la Reynie also relied on a network of paid informers known as "flies" outside and "sheep" in the prisons. He was authorized to call on the armed forces, either the constabulary of Isle-de-France or the guard of Paris (approximately a thousand guards that worked the gates and walls(?) of Paris).

Responsible for the execution of royal lettres de cachets, he was an enforcer of government policy such as when he ensured the corn supply of Paris, defended Protestants against persecution (even after the revocation of the Edict of Nantes, he saved Protestants from interference, sometimes at the risk of his own life and safety), giving aid rather than punishment to beggars and vagabonds, and seeing to the proper retrieval and care of abandoned infants, often left in the streets to die.

De la Reynie also served as judge or prosecutor in lawsuits involving the aristocracy, such as that of the Chevalier de Rohan, decapitated for conspiracy, and the Affair of the Poisons (l'affaire des poisons) involving the Marquise de Brinvilliers and other high-ranking French nobility.

Paris owes to de la Reynie its system of street lighting which made the streets safer (sometimes credited, mistakenly, for prompting the nineteenth century expression "Paris, the City of Light"), the first rules of circulation and parking, the paving of the streets and the water conveyance(?).

== Later life ==
In private life, Reynie was known as an important and discerning collector of ancient Greek and Roman manuscripts, which he himself collated and reconstructed, and as a bibliophile, assembling one of the finest private libraries in Paris. Reynie became a Councillor of State in 1680. In 1697 he was succeeded as Lieutenant-General of Police by the Marquis d'Argenson, to whom many of Reynie's innovations are popularly attributed. Reynie died in 1709 in Paris. In the 20th century, heavy metal band King Diamond released the album "The Eye (King Diamond album)" based on La Reynie's trials in the Chambre Ardente of Paris.
