= Shelby Mahurin =

American author

- Born: May 21, 1992 (age 33); Terre Haute, Indiana
- Occupation: Author
- Years active: 2019 - present
- Notable work: Serpent & Dove

Shelby Mahurin is an American young adult fiction author, best known for writing the Serpent & Dove trilogy.

== Early life ==
Mahurin grew up on a small farm in rural Indiana. She attended Turkey Run High School in Marshall, Indiana. She lives near her childhood home with her husband, children and pets.

== Career ==
Mahurin's debut novel Serpent & Dove debuted at #2 on The New York Times bestseller list. It was the Barnes & Noble YA Book Club selection for September 2019.

== Works ==
=== Serpent & Dove series ===
- Serpent & Dove. HarperTeen. 2019.
- Blood & Honey. HarperTeen. 2020.
- Gods & Monsters. HarperTeen. 2021.

=== The Scarlet Veil series ===
- The Scarlet Veil. HarperTeen. 2023.
- The Shadow Bride. 2025
