= Marie Bosse =

French poisoner, fortune teller and alleged witch

Marie Bosse, also known as La Bosse née Marais or Marette (died 8 May 1679), was a French poisoner, fortune teller and alleged witch. She was one of the accused in the Affair of the Poisons. It was Marie Bosse who pointed out the central figure La Voisin.

Bosse, the widow of the horse trader Nicolas Bosse, was one of the most successful fortune tellers in Paris. Unofficially, she was also a poisoner, who provided poison to people who wished to commit murder. By the end of 1678, Bosse attended a party held by her friend Marie Vigoreaux, the wife of a dressmaker, in the Rue Courtauvilain. During the party, she became drunk and boasted freely that she had become so wealthy by selling deadly poisons to members of the aristocracy that she would soon be able to retire. At the time, the Paris police were investigating poison sales in Paris. A guest at the party, the lawyer Maitre Perrin, reported the conversation to the police. The police sent the wife of a police officer to Bosse to ask for poison to murder her husband, and Bosse provided her with what proved to be deadly poison.

On the morning 4 January 1679, Marie Bosse was arrested with her daughter Manon and her sons, François and Guillaume. Her older son was a soldier in the royal guard, the younger one was recently released from a working house. According to the report, when the family was arrested they were found in the only bed in the house and had committed incest. Marie Vigoreaux was arrested the same day, and was found to have close ties to the family, as she had sexual relations with all of the members of the family. Their confessions revealed that the illegal sale of poison in the capital was handled by a network of fortune tellers. This led to the arrest of the central figure La Voisin and the opening of the Poison affair. Marie Bosse confessed to having provided the poison used by Marguerite de Poulaillon in her attempted murder of her husband. Marie Vigoreux died during interrogation under torture 9 May 1679.

Marie Bosse was condemned to death by burning and executed in Paris on 8 May 1679. Her eldest son was executed for complicity. Her younger chlidren were imprisoned but not executed.

== In fiction ==
Marie Bosse is a character in the novel The Oracle Glass (1994), by Judith Merkle Riley.
