= Chambre Ardente =

Court for the trial of heretics in France

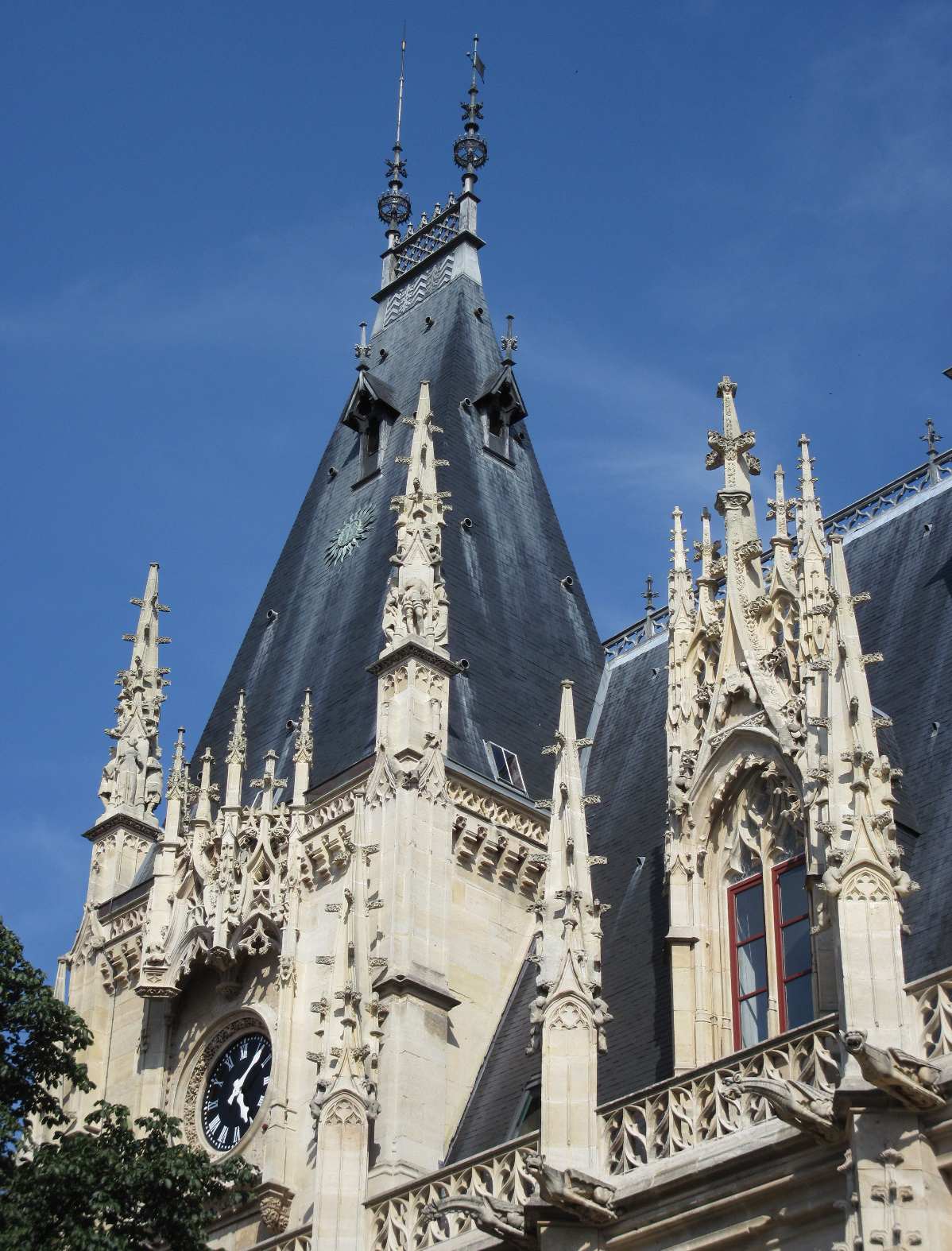
Parlement de Rouen

Location of Rouen, France

La chambre ardente was the name given to a special court established for the trial of heretics in France during the reign of Francis I in the 16th century. The name has been translated to mean "the fiery chamber."

== Institution ==
Special courts designated for the exclusive trials of heretics in France were first instituted in the Parlement de Rouen on April 17, 1545.

At that time approximately two years before the death of Francis in March 1547, the number of heretics in prisons in Normandy awaiting trial was so great that the prisons could barely contain them. To remedy the situation, Francis "authorized the erection in the Parliament of Rouen of a special chamber, consisting of ten or twelve of the most learned and zealous judges, to take cognizance of the crime of heresy to the exclusion of all other employments".

Approximately two years later when Francis died and Henry II took the throne, he deemed the special courts in Rouen as a successful experiment and instituted similar courts "upon a larger scale in the highest court of the realm, the Parlement of Paris. The members of the new commission were selected from among the parliamentary counselors who were removed from any suspicion of heresy and known to be active in the prosecution of offenses against 'mother holy Church.'" It is believed that this special court in Paris was instituted sometime between December 1547 and May 1548.

== Reputation ==
This special court ultimately came to have a reputation of "sending to the flames as many as fell into its hands" and gained the unofficial designation of "la chambre ardente". Despite its reputation, an examination of 323 case histories pertaining to individuals on trial during a twenty-three-month time period from May 1548 to March 1550 reveals that many of those arrested and put on trial for heresy escaped a dire punishment.

Of the 323 cases examined, approximately two-thirds of the cases had come to a final verdict. Of the sentences pronounced, 39 individuals were able to vindicate themselves and were set free with only an injunction that they live "as good Christians in the holy Catholic faith". The punishment associated with 142 cases was amende honorable meaning an "honorable penalty". The "penalties" in these cases were fairly mild and included fines, public ceremonies of penance, banishments, and beatings with warnings never to engage in heresy again. And finally, 37 sentences of death were pronounced of which 6 individuals were put to death by fire while 31 individuals were simply hung.

It is also interesting to examine the occupations of the 323 individuals on trial for heresy. Almost fifty percent of those on trial or 153 individuals were lower and middle class artisans, merchants, and small shop owners. Nearly a third of those on trial or 111 individuals were members of the clergy. 47 individuals were members of the upper class with professions such as barristers and solicitors. Twelve individuals were nobles. While it might appear that the focus of heresy prosecution was the lower or middle class, the greatest target was clergymen as their percent of the population was less than five percent.

No peasants were included among those on trial. This can likely be explained by the fact that the Protestant theology as taught by John Calvin and other reformers was unattractive to peasants. The ideas and beliefs of the Protestant theology were alien. The Protestant theology was a "religion of the book" that made intellectual demands upon those wishing to explore and learn. The books and pamphlets espousing John Calvin's works were written in either French or Latin. Such intellectual demands were beyond the capabilities of an uneducated peasantry that could neither afford books nor read anything but the local patois that dominated the rural areas. As so, most peasants at the time retained their traditional allegiance and belief in the tenets of the Catholic Church.

== Abolishment ==
By an edict on November 19, 1549, Henry II relieved French judges of their duties associated with these special courts effective on January 11, 1550. The attempt to eliminate heresy with special courts had proved to be a failure, and a new approach of sending heretics to the bishops and Church courts for trial was to be implemented. Three years later, the King's Edict of Saint Germain en Laye on March 1, 1553, reestablished the courts. It is unclear as to how long the revived tribunals continued thereafter before permanently being abolished.
