= Lettres de cachet =

Orders of the King of France, often arrest warrants

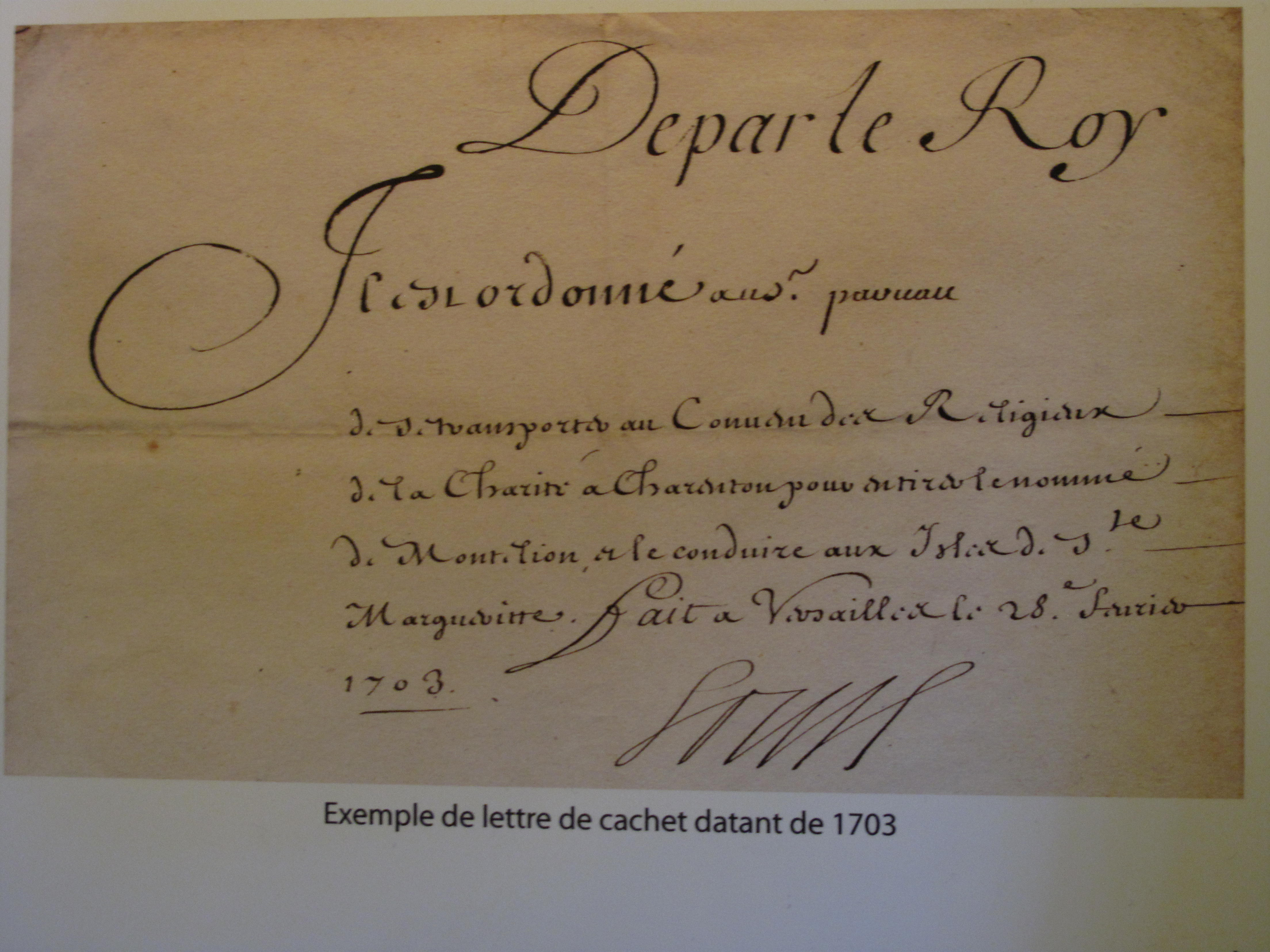
A lettre de cachet of 1703 (reign of Louis XIV), opening De par le roy ("In the name of the King...")

Lettres de cachet (French: [lɛtʁ də kaʃɛ]; lit. 'letters of the sign/signet') were letters signed by the king of France, countersigned by one of his ministers, and closed with the royal seal. They contained orders directly from the king, often to enforce actions and judgments that could not be appealed.

In the case of organized bodies, lettres de cachet were issued for the purpose of preventing assembly, or to accomplish some other definite act. The provincial estates were convoked (called to assembly) in this manner, and it was by a lettre de cachet (in this case, a lettre de jussipri), or by showing in person in a lit de justice, that the king ordered a parlement to register a law despite that parlement's refusal to pass it.

The best-known lettres de cachet, however, were penal, by which a subject was imprisoned without trial and without an opportunity of defense (after inquiry and due diligence by the lieutenant de police) in a state prison or an ordinary jail, confined in a convent or the General Hospital of Paris, transported to the colonies, or expelled to another part of the realm, or from the realm altogether. The lettres were mainly used against drunkards, troublemakers, prostitutes, squanderers of the family fortune, or insane persons. The wealthy sometimes petitioned such lettres to dispose of inconvenient individuals, especially to prevent unequal marriages (nobles with commoners), or to prevent a scandal (the lettre could prevent court cases that might otherwise dishonour a family).

In this respect, the lettres de cachet were a prominent symbol of the abuses of the monarchy of the ancien régime, and as such were suppressed during the French Revolution. In 1789 and 1790, all cases were reviewed by a commission which confirmed most of the sentences. Historian Claude Quétel has interpreted these confirmations as indicating that the lettres were not as arbitrary and unjust as they have been represented after the Revolution, and he hence speaks of a légende noire ('black legend'). (Note: A black legend is set of historical exaggerations construed to darken the memory of a historical period.)

== History ==
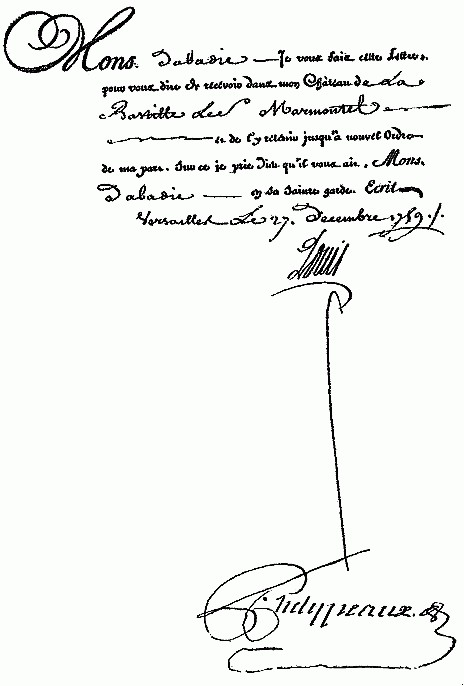
Lettre de cachet ordering Jean-François Marmontel's detention at the Bastille, signed by Louis XV and minister Louis Phélypeaux in 1759

The power to issue lettres de cachet was a royal privilege recognized by the French monarchic civil law that developed during the 13th century, as the Capetian monarchy overcame its initial distrust of Roman law. The principle can be traced to a maxim which furnished a text of the Pandects of Justinian: in their Latin version, "Rex solutus est a legibus", or "The king is released from the laws". "The French legal scholars interpreted the imperial office of the Justinian code generically and arrived at the conclusion that every 'king is an emperor in his own kingdom', that is, he possesses the prerogatives of legal absolutism that the Corpus Juris Civilis attributes to the Roman emperor."

This meant that when the king intervened directly, he could decide without heeding the laws, and even contrary to the laws. This was an early conception, and in early times the order in question was simply verbal; some letters patent of Henry III in 1576 state that François de Montmorency was "prisoner in our castle of the Bastille in Paris by verbal command" of the late king Charles IX.

In the 14th century, the principle was introduced that the order should be written, and hence arose the lettre de cachet. The lettre de cachet belonged to the class of lettres closes, as opposed to lettres patentes, which contained the expression of the legal and permanent will of the king, and had to be furnished with the seal of state affixed by the chancellor.

The lettres de cachet, on the contrary, were signed simply by a secretary of state for the king; they bore merely the imprint of the king's privy seal, from which circumstance they were often called, in the 14th and 15th centuries, lettres de petit signet or lettres de petit cachet, and were entirely exempt from the control of the chancellor.

== As a tool ==
In addition to serving the government as a silent weapon against political adversaries or controversial writers and as a means of punishing culprits of high birth without the scandal of a lawsuit, the lettres de cachet had many other uses. They were employed by the police in dealing with prostitutes, and on their authority lunatics were shut up in hospitals and sometimes in prisons.

They were also often used by heads of families as a means of correction, for example, to protect the family honour from the disorderly or criminal conduct of sons. The case of the Marquis de Sade (imprisoned 1777–1790 under a lettre de cachet obtained by his wealthy and influential mother-in-law) is a prominent example. Wives, too, took advantage of them to curb the profligacy of husbands, and vice versa.

In reality, the secretary of state had delegated powers, and could issue them at his own discretion, and in most cases the king was unaware of their issue.

== Protests ==
Protests against the lettres de cachet were made continually by the Parlement of Paris and by the provincial parlements, and also by the Estates-General. In 1648, during the Fronde, the sovereign courts of Paris, (Note: Parlement, Chambre des comptes, Cour des Aides, Grand Conseil together) by their Arrêt d'Union, procured their momentary suppression in a kind of charter of liberties which they imposed upon the crown, but which was short-lived.

It was not until the reign of Louis XVI that a reaction against the abuse became clearly perceptible. At the beginning of that reign Malesherbes during his short ministry endeavoured to infuse some measure of justice into the system, and in March 1784 the baron de Breteuil, a minister of the king's household, addressed a circular to the intendants and the lieutenant of police with a view to preventing the most serious abuses connected with the issue of lettres de cachet.

The Comte de Mirabeau wrote a scathing indictment of lettres de cachet while imprisoned in the dungeon of Vincennes (by lettre de cachet obtained by his father). The treatise was published after his liberation in 1782 under the title Les Lettres de cachet et des prisons d'etat and was widely read throughout Europe.

Besides the Bastille, there were thirty prisons in Paris by 1779 in which a person could be detained without trial. Convents were used for the same purpose.

They were reported to have been openly sold, in the reign of Louis XV, by the mistress of one of his ministers.

In Paris, in 1779, the Cour des Aides demanded their suppression, and in March 1788 the Parlement of Paris made some exceedingly energetic remonstrances, which are important for the light they throw upon old French public law. The crown, however, did not decide to lay aside this weapon, and in a declaration to the States-General in the royal session of June 23, 1789 (art. 15) it did not renounce it absolutely.

== Abolition and reinstatement ==
Lettres de cachet were abolished after the French Revolution by the Constituent Assembly, but Napoleon reestablished their penal equivalent by a political measure in the decree of 8 March 1801 on the state prisons. This was one of the acts brought up against him by the senatus-consulte of 3 April 1814, which pronounced his fall "considering that he has violated the constitutional laws by the decrees on the state prisons."

== Victims of lettres de cachet ==
- Charles Simon Favart (because a nobleman was interested in his wife)
- Luke Joseph Hooke (deprived of his academic chair in theology for awarding a PhD to a candidate without having read the (heretical) thesis.)
- Honoré Gabriel Riqueti, comte de Mirabeau (several times, on request of his father, as protection against creditors and once to prevent a death penalty for kidnapping and eloping with a married woman)
- Marguerite Monvoisin (complicity in a poisoning affair. A lettre de cachet was used to avoid a scandal that might have affected Françoise-Athénaïs, marquise de Montespan, a mistress of the King who was assumed to have been involved).
- Pigault-Lebrun (twice, for eloping with two successive young women)
- Alexandre Balthazar Laurent Grimod de La Reynière (misconduct: sent away to an abbey by his father)
- Marquis de Sade (rape and torture. The lettre was petitioned by the marquis' wife, to avoid a court case)
- Comte de Sanois (domestic disputes and debt. His wife petitioned a Lettre, claiming her husband insane)
- Voltaire (once for slander, a second time for violent menaces against Guy Auguste de Rohan-Chabot)
- Jean-François Marmontel, accused to be the author of a satire against the Duke d'Aumont. His account of his short stay in the Bastille contains a description of the food he received, the room he was imprisoned with his servant, and the goodwill shown to him.
- Giacomo Casanova (dueling)
- Marie-Anne de La Ville (practiced black magic. A scandalous trial was avoided by a lettre)
- Jean-Baptiste Forqueray (request of his father)

== In literature ==
- Honoré de Mirabeau, Des Lettres de Cachet et des prisons d'état (Hamburg, 1782), written in the dungeon at Vincennes into which his father had thrown him by a lettre de cachet, one of the ablest and most eloquent of his works, which had an immense circulation and was translated into English in 1788.
- The Castle of Wolfenbach, one of the "Horrid Novels" mentioned in Northanger Abbey by Jane Austen, features a lettre de cachet as a major plot point when the main villain, the guardian of a young lady who has run away, tries to use a lettre de cachet to obligate her to be returned to him so he can force her into marriage.
- Doctor Alexandre Manette, in Charles Dickens' A Tale of Two Cities, was thrown into the Bastille prison by means of a lettre de cachet. In addition, Charles Darnay suspected that his uncle, a marquis, would have used a lettre de cachet to put Darnay himself into prison had the Marquis not fallen out of favour with the royal court.

== See also ==
- Bill of attainder
- Divine right of kings
- Fundamental laws of the Kingdom of France
- National Security Letter
- Firman
- Letters close
