= Judith Merkle Riley =

American novelist

- Born: Judith Astria Merkle; January 14, 1942; Brunswick, Maine, U.S.
- Died: September 12, 2010 (aged 68); Claremont, California, U.S.
- Occupations: Teacher, novelist
- Children: 2
- Relatives: Fred Merkle (great-uncle); Ralph C. Merkle (brother)
- Writing career
- Pen name: Judith Merkle Riley
- Period: 1988–1999
- Genre: Historical fiction

A Vision of Light, 1988/Dec

Judith Merkle Riley (January 14, 1942 – September 12, 2010) was an American writer, teacher and academic who wrote six historical romance novels.

== Biography ==
Judith Astria Merkle was born in 1942 and grew up in Livermore, California. Her great-uncle was baseball player Fred Merkle. Her father, Theodore Charles Merkle, ran Project Pluto, and her brother Ralph is a pioneer in public key cryptography. She earned a MA from Harvard University and held a Ph.D. from the University of California at Berkeley and taught in the Department of Government at Claremont McKenna College in Claremont, California.

She wrote six historical fiction novels, starting in 1988.

She was married and had two children, a daughter Elizabeth and a son Marlow.

Riley died on September 12, 2010, from ovarian cancer.

== Bibliography ==
=== Medieval World of Margaret of Ashbury series ===
1. A Vision of Light (1988) ISBN 978-0307237873
2. In Pursuit of the Green Lion (1990) ISBN 978-0307237880
3. The Water-devil (2007) ISBN 978-0307237897

=== Single novels ===
- The Oracle Glass (1994) ISBN 978-1402270581
- The Serpent Garden (1996) ISBN 978-0307395368
- The Master of All Desires (1999) ISBN 978-1402270611
