= Philbert =

Philbert may refer to

== People ==
- Madame Philbert (?-1679), a participant in the Affair of the Poisons, executed for murdering her first husband
- Phillippe Rebille Philbert (1639 – c. 1717), French flautist and court musician to Louis XIV; second husband of Madame Philbert
- Philbert Blair (born 1943), Guyanese cricketer
- Philbert Dy, Filipino film critic
- Philbert Maurice d'Ocagne (1862–1938), French engineer and mathematician

== Other uses ==
- Philbert Frog, British animated series
- Philbert, a show within a show on the fifth season of BoJack Horseman

== See also ==
- Filbert (disambiguation)
- Philibert (disambiguation)
