= Filbert =

Filbert may refer to:

== People ==
- Peter Filbert (1793–1864), American politician
- John H. Filbert (died 1917), founder of J.H. Filbert
- Filbert Bayi (born 1953), Tanzanian middle-distance runner
- Jammal Filbert Brown (born 1981), American football offensive tackle
- Lim Wei, Filbert (born 1999), Founder of Filca Group in Singapore

== Other uses ==
- Corylus, the filbert tree or hazel, a genus of deciduous tree
  - Corylus maxima, the filbert, a species of hazel
  - Filbert nut or hazelnut, any of the nuts deriving from species of the genus Corylus
- Filbert paintbrush for artists
- The Filbert (horse) (foaled in 1980), a New Zealand bred race-horse
- Filbert, South Carolina, an unincorporated community
- Filbert, West Virginia, a former town now part of the City of Gary
- Filbert the Fox, Leicester City Football Club's mascot
- J.H. Filbert, an American manufacturer of butter substitutes

== See also ==
- Filburt, a cartoon turtle in Rocko's Modern Life
- Philbert (disambiguation)
- Philibert (disambiguation)
