= Philibert Berthelier =

Philibert Berthelier may refer to:

- Philibert Berthelier (Geneva patriot) (c. 1465–1519), one of the first martyrs in Geneva's fight for liberty
- Philibert Berthelier (Son of Geneva patriot) (fl. 1552–1555), son of the Geneva patriot who clashed with John Calvin
