= Marguerite de Poulaillon =

French noble and one of the accused in the famous Affair of the Poisons

Marguerite de Poulaillon (née de Jehan; fl. 1697), was a French noble, one of the accused in the famous Affair of the Poisons (1677-1682).

She belonged to a noble family in Bordeaux and was described as a charming beauty. She was arranged to marry the much older Alexander de Poulaillon, with whom she became very unhappy. Desperately in love with the adventurer Riviére, who demanded money from her, she made several attempts to murder her husband, once by the use of poison acquired from Marie Bosse. Her husband was warned of her attempts, had her imprisoned in a convent in 1678 and reported her.

Marguerite de Poulaillon was the first person from the upper classes to be implicated in the Poison Affair, and the case against her was expected to form a precedent against others accused of similar social status, and was therefore carefully treated. She confessed to her guilt before trial and explained herself willing to submit to the death penalty. She was initially sentenced to banishment 5 June 1679. However, according to Gabriel Nicolas de la Reynie, she was unsatisfied with the sentence, perhaps because she feared being put under the guardianship of her husband, and asked to be imprisoned, as she would otherwise be inclined to repeat her crimes. Her sentence was therefore changed to confinement in a work house for former prostitutes in Angers. In 1697, Marguerite de Poulaillon appealed to be transferred from the work house to a convent, but her appeal was denied by Gabriel Nicolas de la Reynie, and she remained in the prison work house until her death.

The court was reportedly influenced by her beauty and by the fact that she was related to and acquainted with several members of the court. The verdict made the court lose the respect of the public. It also affected the verdicts of other accused based on rank: Francoise de Dreux and Marguerite Leféron, the former guilty of several murders and the latter to the murder of her husband to marry her lover, were both Parisian socialites and were both merely sentenced to exile from Paris, while Catherine Philbert, the wife of court musician Philippe Rebille Philbert, who poisoned her first husband to marry Philbert, was hanged for the same crime.
