= Neuser =

Neuser is a surname. Notable people with the surname include:

- Adam Neuser (c. 1530–1576), German Protestant pastor of Heidelberg
- Fritz Neuser (born 1932), German cyclist
- Gerhard Neuser (1938–1993), German footballer
- Norbert Neuser, German teacher and politician of the Social Democratic Party who served as a Member of the European Parliament from 2009 to 2022
- Rosemarie Neuser (born 1955), German former footballer
- Wilhelm Heinrich Neuser (1926–2010, German Protestant theologian, church historian, professor and a leading scholar
