= Françoise de Dreux =

French noblewoman (d. after 1681)

Françoise de Dreux (d. after 1681) was a French noble, an accused in the famous Affair of the Poisons.

Françoise de Dreux was married to a member of the Paris Parlement and cousin of two judges in the Poison Affair. She was a popular member of Paris high society and described as a charming beauty. She was passionately in love with Armand Jean de Vignerot du Plessis, the Duke de Richelieu, and a regular client of the poisoner Marguerite Joly.

She was brought to trial in April 1679 after having been pointed out by Marie Bosse on the charges of murder of: Monsieur Pajot; Monsieur de Varennes; one of her lovers; one of her competing lovers of the Duke de Richelieu; the attempted murders of her husband and of Anne de Richelieu (wife of the Duke de Richelieu); and of having ordered poisoned wine from La Voisin. She was acquitted on 27 April 1680. An epigram was written about her and the matter. After her poison supplier, Joly, was arrested, an order for her re-arrest was ordered in 1681. She left the country to avoid arrest, and upon the appeal from both her husband and her lover, she was spared any punishment for her crimes except exile from the capital. In the end, she was allowed to live in the capital anyway under her husband's supervision.

The case against Françoise de Dreux and Marguerite Leféron, as well as that of Marguerite de Poulaillon, attracted attention as they were the first clients, and the first members of the upper classes to be implicated in the affair, and the light sentences toward them, despite their guilt, was considered damaging for the legitimacy of the court; they were obviously a proof of class discrimination, as others accused of the same crime in the case, but belonging to a different social class, were sentenced to be executed. One example was that of Catherine Philbert, who in 1673 murdered her carpenter husband Brunet by poison from Marie Bosse in order to marry her lover, musician Philippe Rebille Philbert: her crime was identical to that of Leféron, but she was sentenced to hang after having her right hand cut off.
