= Philibert =

Philibert may refer to the following people:

== Given name ==
Persons without a surname ordered chronologically

- Philibert of Jumièges (c. 608–685), French saint and abbot
- Philibert de Naillac (died 1421), Grand Master of the Knights Hospitaller
- Philibert I of Savoy (1465–1482), husband of Bianca Maria Sforza
- Philibert II of Savoy (1480–1504), Knight of the Golden Fleece
- Philibert of Châlon (1502–1530), last prince of Orange from the house of Châlon
- Philibert, Margrave of Baden-Baden (1536–1569), son-in-law of Duke William IV of Bavaria
- Philibert, comte de Gramont (1621–1707), subject of the famous Mémoirs
- Philibert Berthelier (Geneva patriot) (c. 1465–1519), one of the first martyrs in Geneva's fight for liberty
- Philibert Berthelier (Son of Geneva patriot) (fl. 1552–1555), son of the Geneva patriot who clashed with John Calvin
- Philibert Commerçon (1727–1773), French naturalist
- Philibert Delavigne (c. 1700–1750), French composer
- Philibert Humm (born 1991), French novelist and journalist
- Philibert Jambe de Fer (fl. 1548–1564), French Renaissance composer of religious music
- Philibert de l'Orme (c. 1510–1570), French architect
- Philibert Orry (1689–1747), Count of Vignory
- Philibert Jacques Melotte (1880–1961), British astronomer
- Philibert Mees (1929–2006), Flemish composer and pianist
- Philibert François Rouxel de Blanchelande (1735–1793), French Governor of Saint-Domingue
- Philibert Tsiranana (1912–1978), Malagasy politician and leader

== Surname ==
- Dan Philibert (born 1970), retired French hurdler
- Enzo Philibert (born 2002), French professional footballer
- Nicolas Philibert (born 1951), French film director and actor
- Paul Philibert (born 1944), Canadian politician
- Pierre-Henri Philibert (1774–1824), French Navy officer

== Other ==
- Philippe Rebille Philbert (1639–1717), also known as Philibert, French flautist

== See also ==
- Claude-Philibert
- Jean-Mathieu-Philibert
- Joseph-Philibert
- Philibert-Louis Debucourt (1755–1832), French artist
