= Marguerite Leféron =

Marguerite Leféron or Le Féron (née Galart; d. after 1680), was a defendant of the famous Affair of the Poisons, which lasted from 1677 to 1682.

Marguerite Leféron belonged to the Parisian Bourgeoisie and married judge Jerome Leferon in 1654. The marriage was unhappy, and she had a lover by the name of De Prade. She was a client of La Voisin, who sold her aphrodisiac to attract her lover, and poison to murder her husband. She reportedly used the poison to murder her husband, who died 8 September 1669. When she was widowed, she remarried her lover De Prade. When De Prade proved to be a fortune hunter, she decided to murder him as well. This was however prevented by his escape.

Leféron was arrested during the Poison Affair. She was named as the client of La Voisin 22 March 1679. La Voisin testified that she had read Leferons hand and predicted the death of her husband. the charge against her was a convincing case, with fourteen wittnesses against her. She was arrested and charged of the murder of her first husband on 9 April 1679. La Voisin and Leféron was confronted in prison, and Leféron denied all allegations. Leféron stated that she had been offered to buy poision by La Voisin to murder her husband, but that she had denied, since her husband was by then already dying from natural causes. On 7 April 1680, she was sentenced to exile from the capital and a fine of 1500 livres.

The case against Marguerite Leferon and Françoise de Dreux, as well as that of Marguerite de Poulaillon, attracted attention as they were the first clients and the first members of the upper classes to be implicated in the affair. The light sentences imposed on them, despite their guilt, was considered damaging to the legitimacy of the court. This was obvious proof of class discrimination, as others accused for the same crime in the case, but of a different social class, were sentenced to execution. One example was that of Madame Philbert, who in 1673 murdered her carpenter husband Brunet by poison of Marie Bosse in order to marry her lover, Philippe Rebille Philbert: her crime was identical to that of Leferon, but she was sentenced to hang after having her right hand cut off.
