= Idelette Calvin =

Wife of John Calvin

Idelette Stordeur de Bure (Boer) Calvin
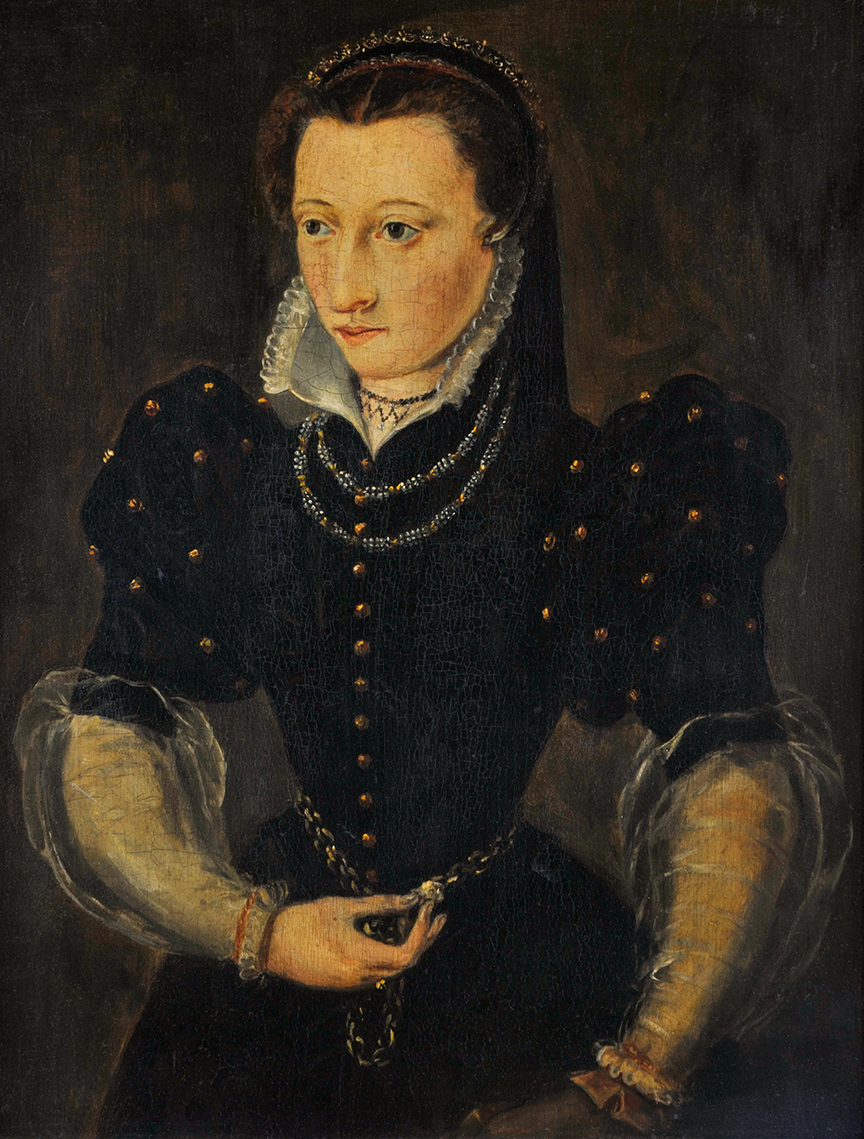
- Born: Idelette de Bure; 1500; Liège
- Died: 1549 (aged 48–49)
- Occupation: Housewife
- Known for: Only wife of John Calvin
- Spouse(s): John Stordeur (until his death); John Calvin

Idelette Stordeur de Bure Calvin (1500–1549) was the wife of the French reformer John Calvin (Jean Cauvin).

== Life ==
Idelette de Bure was born in Liège and first married John Stordeur from the same city. At some stage they moved to Strassburg where they were recorded as being Anabaptists. Idelette and John Stordeur had two children (Charles, Judith) before Stordeur died after a brief illness, leaving Idelette a widow.

Calvin was so caught up in his labors that he did not seem to consider marriage until age 30 or so. He asked friends to help him find a woman who was "chaste, obliging, not fastidious, economical, patient, and careful for (his) health". His fellow laborer Martin Bucer had known Idelette and recommended her to Calvin in confidence that she would fit the bill. They married in August 1540.

Idelette bore Calvin one son and possibly a few daughters, all of whom died in infancy.

Though she survived the plague when it ravaged Geneva, Idelette died after a lengthy illness in 1549. Upon her deathbed she was patient, and her words, edifying, e.g.: "O God of Abraham, and of all our fathers, in thee have the faithful trusted during so many past ages, and none of them have trusted in vain. I also will hope".

== Calvin on Idelette ==
What Calvin wrote to Pierre Viret some days after her death will illustrate her character further.

I have been bereaved of the best companion of my life, of one who, had it been so ordered, would not only have been the willing sharer of my indigence, but even of my death. During her life she was the faithful helper of my ministry.

— John Calvin, Letter to Pierre Viret, 1549

and,

From her I never experienced the slightest hindrance. She was never troublesome to me throughout the entire course of her illness; she was more anxious about her children than about herself. As I feared these private cares might annoy her to no purpose, I took occasion, on the third day before her death to mention that I would not fail in discharging my duty to her children. Taking up the matter immediately, she said, 'I have already committed them to God.' When I said that that was not to prevent me from caring for them, she replied, 'I know you will not neglect what you know has been committed to God.' Lately, also, when a certain woman insisted that she should talk with me regarding these matters, I, for the first time, heard her give the following brief answer: 'Assuredly the principal thing is that they live a pious and holy life. My husband is not to be urged to instruct them in religious knowledge and in the fear of God. If they be pious, I am sure he will gladly be a father to them; but if not, they do not deserve that I should ask for aught in their behalf.' This nobleness of mind will weigh more with me than a hundred recommendations.

— John Calvin, Letter to Pierre Viret, 1549

== See also ==
- John Calvin
- Anabaptist
