= I Can't Believe It's Not Butter! =

Brand of vegetable oil spread

- Product type: Margarine
- Current owner: Flora Food Group
- Country: United States
- Introduced: 1981; 45 years ago
- Markets: Global
- Previous owners: Unilever
- Website: www.icantbelieveitsnotbutter.com

I Can't Believe It's Not Butter! is a brand of margarine, produced by Flora Food Group and marketed as a substitute for butter.

== History ==
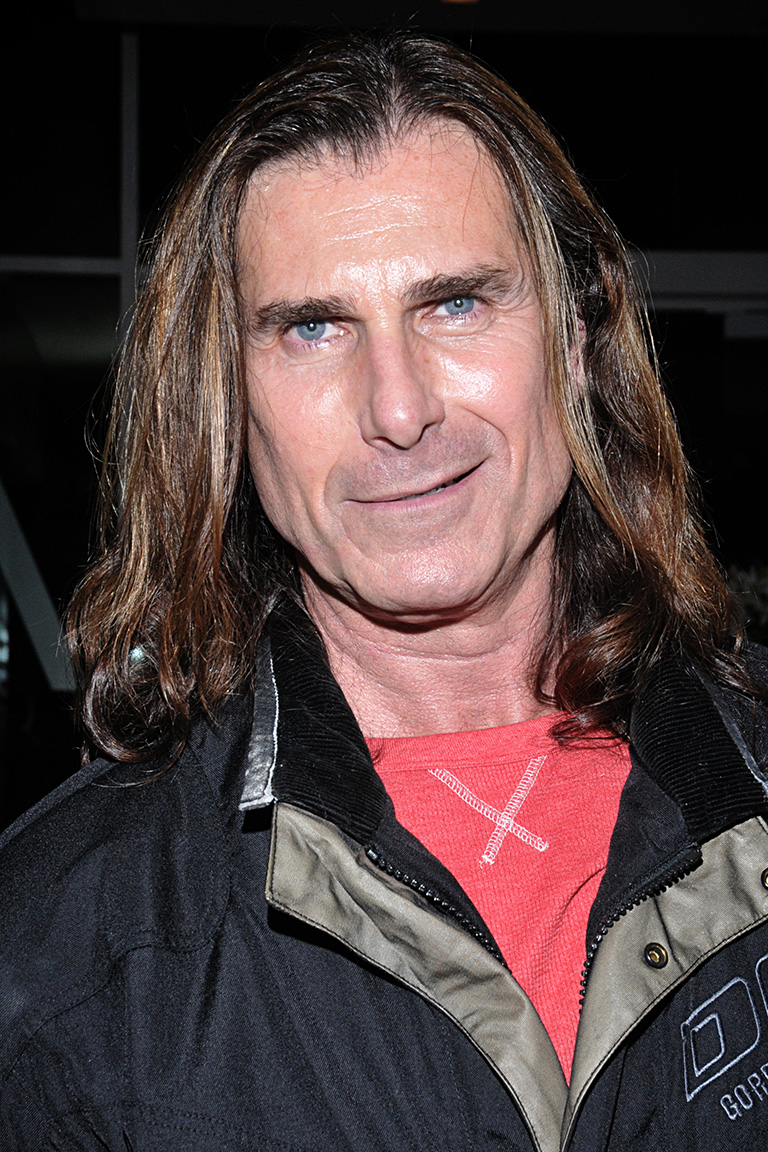
Fabio Lanzoni, spokesman of the brand from 1994 until 2016.

The J.H. Filbert company, based in Baltimore, Maryland, US developed the product in 1979 as a low-cost alternative to butter for the food service industry. The name originated from a comment by the husband of a company secretary as he sampled the product and it was first marketed to retail consumers in 1981. The company was acquired by Unilever in 1986, which then expanded sales of the product, previously only available primarily in the Washington, DC/Baltimore area, throughout the entire United States in 1988 and later to the United Kingdom, Canada and Mexico in 1991. The product was put on the market in Germany in 2011 and in Chile in 2012.

In 2018, Unilever sold its margarine and spreads business, which included the I Can't Believe It's Not Butter! brand, to investment firm Kohlberg Kravis Roberts (KKR) for US$8.04 billion.

Fabio was the brand's celebrity spokesman from 1994 until 2016, appearing in many of the brand's commercials, usually with his only line of dialogue being the brand name.

== Varieties ==
In addition to a regular and "light" spread, Unilever also uses the brand name to market a liquid butter substitute contained in a spray-bottle. This product is an emulsion of vegetable oil in water formulated with a "hint" of butter flavor (derived from buttermilk) and is marketed as having zero calories and zero fat content. In 2017, Unilever announced two new varieties, "It's Vegan" and "It's Organic".

== Consumer sales ==
=== United States ===
It was reported in July 2005 (per research from the market research company Information Resources) that the product at that time led in product sales for its category of margarines, butter blends and spreads, with sales revenue standing at US $244.7 million, summarized from 52 weeks up to July 10, 2005.

But by 2012, the situation had changed. It was reported in 2012 by Euromonitor International that while sales of butter and spreadable oil fell, margarine sales increased by 1.1 percent, but sales of I Can't Believe It's Not Butter fell by 3.9 percent. 7 percent of sales at Unilever consists of spreads, with a significant amount consisting of butter substitutes, the sales of which are on the decline.

In 2016, there were $248.4 million in sales of I Can't Believe It's Not Butter and $47.7 million of I Can't Believe It's Not Butter Light.

== UK rebranding ==
In January 2017, Unilever rebranded the product as "I Can't Believe It's So Good... For Everything!" in the UK. The stated objective was to increase awareness of the product's versatility. The rebrand was greeted with puzzlement and some derision by many media commentators. Subsequently, the branding was simplified to "I Can't Believe It's So Good...". The brand was returned to its original form in November 2019.

== See also ==
- Stork (margarine)
