= John Calvin =

French Protestant reformer (1509–1564)

The Reverend John Calvin
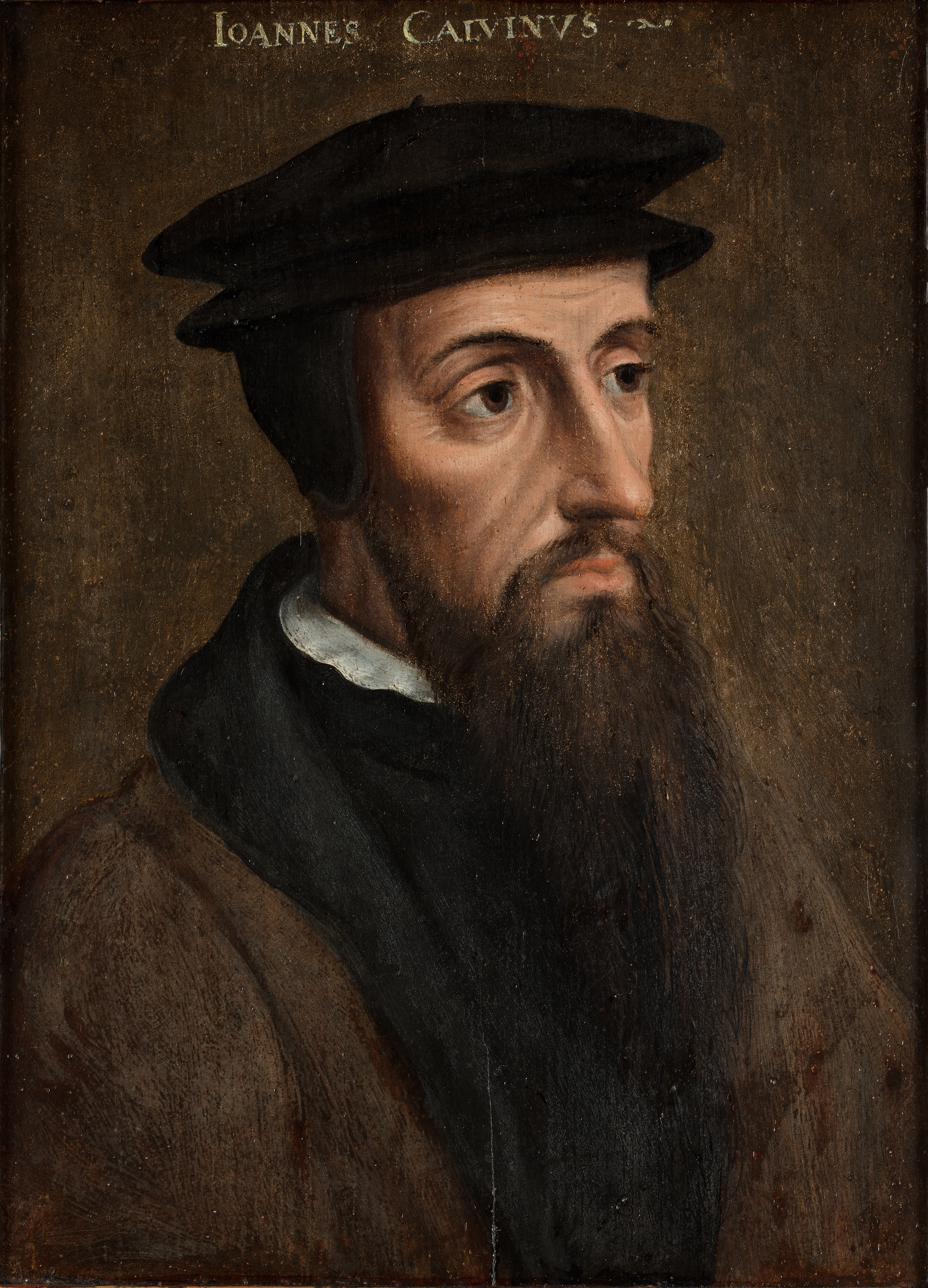
- Portrait, c. 1550

Personal life
- Born: Jehan Cauvin; 10 July 1509 Noyon, Picardy, France
- Died: 27 May 1564 (aged 54) Geneva, Republic of Geneva
- Spouse: Idelette de Bure (m. 1540; died 1549)
- Children: Jacques
- Era: Renaissance
- Main interest: Systematic theology
- Notable ideas: Predestination; Regulative principle of worship; Monergism; Covenantalism; Imputed righteousness
- Notable work: Institutes of the Christian Religion (1536)
- Education: University of Paris; University of Orléans; University of Bourges
- Occupation: Reformer, minister, author

Religious life
- Religion: Christianity
- Church: Protestant
- Movement: Reformation; Calvinism

John Calvin (/ˈkælvɪn/; Middle French: Jehan Cauvin; French: Jean Calvin [ʒɑ̃ kalvɛ̃]; 10 July 1509 – 27 May 1564) was a French theologian, pastor and reformer in Geneva during the Protestant Reformation. He was the principal figure in the development of the system of Christian theology later called Calvinism, including its doctrines of predestination and of God's absolute sovereignty in the salvation of the human soul from death and eternal damnation. Calvinist doctrines were influenced by and elaborated upon Augustinian and other Christian traditions. Various Reformed Church movements, including Continental Reformed, Congregationalism, Presbyterianism, Waldensians, Baptist Reformed, Calvinist Methodism, and Reformed Anglican Churches, which look to Calvin as the chief expositor of their beliefs, have spread throughout the world.

Calvin was a dedicated polemicist and apologetic writer who generated much controversy. He also exchanged cordial and supportive letters with many reformers, including Philipp Melanchthon and Heinrich Bullinger. In addition to his seminal Institutes of the Christian Religion, Calvin wrote commentaries on most books of the Bible, confessional documents, and various other theological treatises.

Calvin was originally trained as a humanist lawyer. He broke from the Roman Catholic Church around 1530. After religious tensions erupted in widespread deadly violence against Protestant Christians in France, Calvin fled to Basel, Switzerland, where in 1536 he published the first edition of the Institutes. In the same year, Calvin was recruited by Frenchman William Farel to join the Reformation in Geneva, where he regularly preached sermons throughout the week. However, the governing council of the city resisted the implementation of their ideas, and both men were expelled. At the invitation of Martin Bucer, Calvin proceeded to Strasbourg, where he became the minister of a church of French refugees. He continued to support the reform movement in Geneva, and in 1541 he was invited back to lead the church of the city.

Following his return, Calvin introduced new forms of church government and liturgy, despite opposition from several powerful families in the city who tried to curb his authority. During this period, Michael Servetus, a Spaniard regarded by both Roman Catholics and Protestants as having a heretical view of the Trinity, arrived in Geneva. He was denounced by Calvin and burned at the stake for heresy by the city council. Following an influx of supportive refugees and new elections to the city council, Calvin's opponents were forced out. Calvin spent his final years promoting the Reformation both in Geneva and throughout Europe.

== Life ==
=== Early life (1509–1535) ===
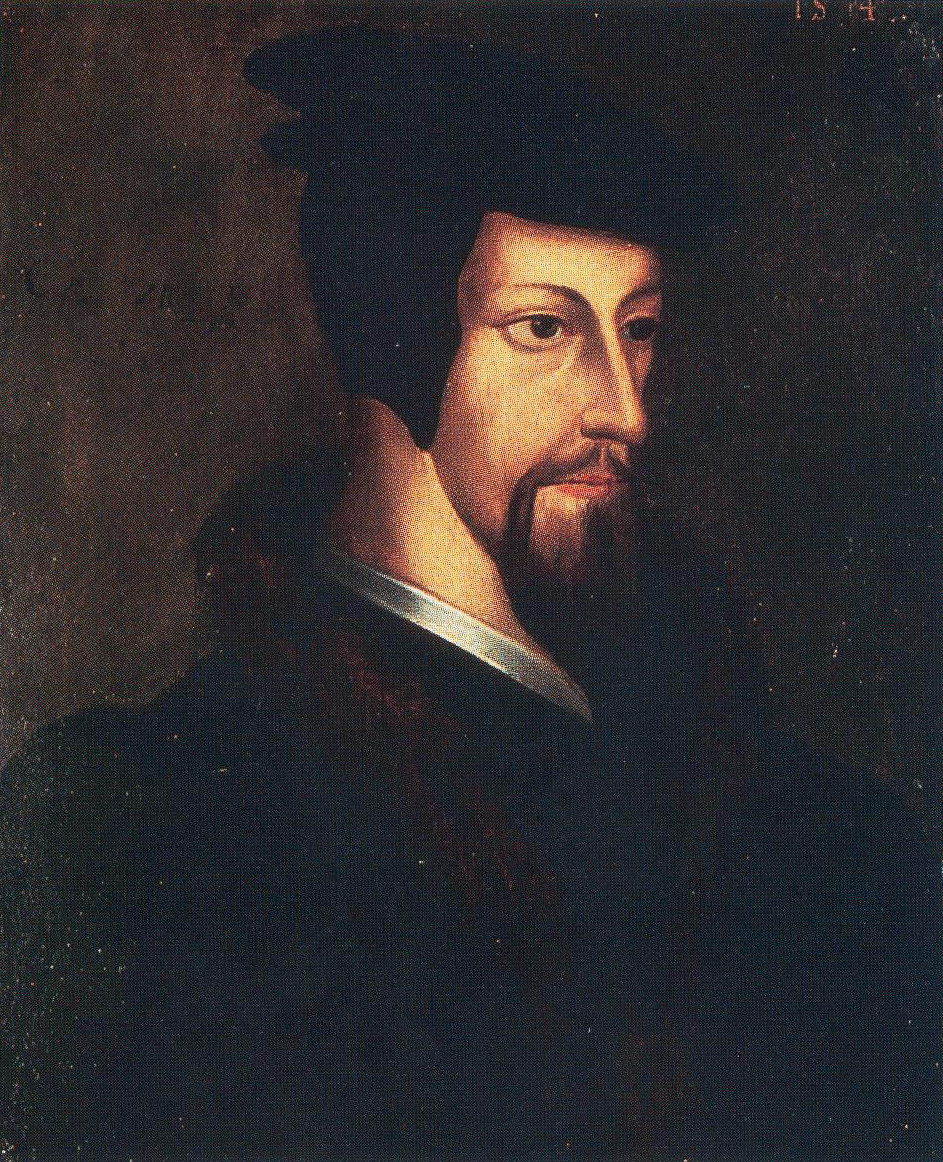
Calvin was originally interested in the priesthood, but he changed course to study law in Orléans and Bourges. Painting titled Portrait of Young John Calvin from the collection of the Library of Geneva.

John Calvin was born as Jehan Cauvin on 10 July 1509, in Noyon, a town in Picardy, a province of the Kingdom of France. He was the second of three sons who survived infancy. His mother, Jeanne le Franc, was the daughter of an innkeeper from Cambrai. She died of an unknown cause in Calvin's childhood, after having borne four more children. Calvin's father, Gérard Cauvin, had a prosperous career as the cathedral notary and registrar to the ecclesiastical court. Gérard intended his three sons—Charles, Jean, and Antoine—for the priesthood.

Young Calvin was particularly precocious. By age 12, he was employed by the bishop as a clerk and received the tonsure, cutting his hair to symbolize his dedication to the Church. He also won the patronage of an influential family, the Montmors. Through their assistance, Calvin was able to attend the Collège de la Marche, Paris, where he learned Latin from one of its greatest teachers, Mathurin Cordier. Once he completed the course, he entered the Collège de Montaigu as a philosophy student.

In 1525 or 1526, Gérard withdrew his son from the Collège de Montaigu and enrolled him in the University of Orléans to study law. According to contemporary biographers Theodore Beza and Nicolas Colladon, Gérard believed that Calvin would earn more money as a lawyer than as a priest. After a few years of quiet study, Calvin entered the University of Bourges in 1529. He was intrigued by Andreas Alciati, a humanist lawyer. Humanism was a European intellectual movement which stressed classical studies. During his 18-month stay in Bourges, Calvin learned Koine Greek, a necessity for studying the New Testament.

Alternative theories have been suggested regarding the date of Calvin's religious conversion. Some have placed the date around 1533, shortly before he resigned from his chaplaincy. In this view, his resignation is the direct evidence for his conversion to the evangelical faith. However, T. H. L. Parker argues that, although this date is a terminus for his conversion, the more likely date is in late 1529 or early 1530. The main evidence for his conversion is contained in two significantly different accounts of his conversion. In the first, found in his Commentary on the Book of Psalms, Calvin portrayed his conversion as a sudden change of mind, brought about by God:

God by a sudden conversion subdued and brought my mind to a teachable frame, which was more hardened in such matters than might have been expected from one at my early period of life. Having thus received some taste and knowledge of true godliness, I was immediately inflamed with so intense a desire to make progress therein, that although I did not altogether leave off other studies, yet I pursued them with less ardor.

In the second account, Calvin wrote of a long process of inner turmoil, followed by spiritual and psychological anguish:

Being exceedingly alarmed at the misery into which I had fallen, and much more at that which threatened me in view of eternal death, I, duty bound, made it my first business to betake myself to your way, condemning my past life, not without groans and tears. And now, O Lord, what remains to a wretch like me, but instead of defence, earnestly to supplicate you not to judge that fearful abandonment of your Word according to its deserts, from which in your wondrous goodness you have at last delivered me.

Scholars have argued about the precise interpretation of these accounts, but most agree that his conversion corresponded with his break from the Roman Catholic Church. The Calvin biographer Bruce Gordon has stressed that "the two accounts are not antithetical, revealing some inconsistency in Calvin's memory, but rather [are] two different ways of expressing the same reality."

By 1532, Calvin received his licentiate in law and published his first book, a commentary on Seneca's De Clementia. After uneventful trips to Orléans and his hometown of Noyon, Calvin returned to Paris in October 1533. During this time, tensions rose at the Collège Royal (later to become the Collège de France) between the humanists/reformers and the conservative senior faculty members. One of the reformers, Nicolas Cop, was rector of the university. On 1 November 1533 he devoted his inaugural address to the need for reform and renewal in the Roman Catholic Church. The address provoked a strong reaction from the faculty, who denounced it as heretical, forcing Cop to flee to Basel. Calvin, a close friend of Cop, was implicated in the offence, and for the next year he was forced into hiding. He remained on the move, sheltering with his friend Louis du Tillet in Angoulême and taking refuge in Noyon and Orléans. He was finally forced to flee France during the Affair of the Placards in mid-October 1534. In that incident, unknown reformers had posted placards in various cities criticising the Roman Catholic mass, to which adherents of the Roman Catholic church responded with violence against the would-be Reformers and their sympathizers. In January 1535, Calvin joined Cop in Basel, a city under the enduring influence of the late reformer Johannes Oecolampadius.

=== Reform work commences (1536–1538) ===
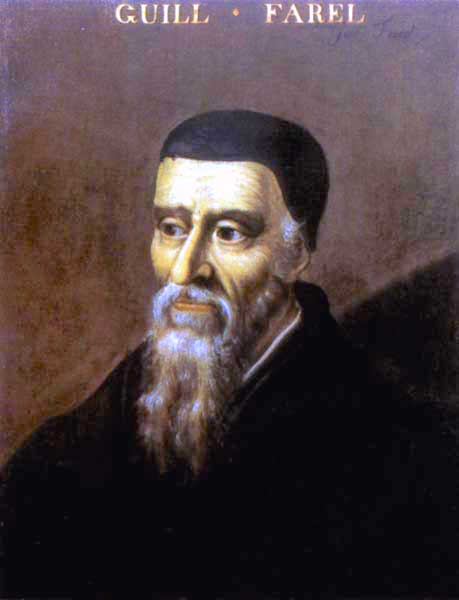
William Farel was the reformer who persuaded Calvin to stay in Geneva. 16th-century painting. In the Bibliothèque Publique et Universitaire, Geneva.

In March 1536, Calvin published the first edition of his Institutio Christianae Religionis or Institutes of the Christian Religion. The work was an apologia or defence of his faith and a statement of the doctrinal position of the reformers. He also intended it to serve as an elementary instruction book for anyone interested in the Christian faith. The book was the first expression of his theology. Calvin updated the work and published new editions throughout his life. Shortly after its publication, he left Basel for Ferrara, Italy, where he briefly served as secretary to Princess Renée of France. By June he was back in Paris with his brother Antoine, who was resolving their father's affairs. Following the Edict of Coucy, which gave a six-month period for heretics to reconcile with the Catholic faith, Calvin decided that there was no future for him in France.

In August he set off for Strasbourg, a free imperial city of the Holy Roman Empire and a refuge for reformers. Due to military manoeuvres of imperial and French forces, he was forced to make a detour to the south, bringing him to Geneva. Calvin had intended to stay only a single night, but William Farel, a fellow French reformer residing in the city, implored him to stay and assist him in his work of reforming the church there. Calvin accepted his new role without any preconditions on his tasks or duties. The office to which he was initially assigned is unknown. He was eventually given the title of "reader", which most likely meant that he could give expository lectures on the Bible. In October 1536, Calvin participated in the disputation of Lausanne, trying to bring that city into the Protestant camp.

Sometime in 1537 he was selected to be a "pastor" although he never received any pastoral consecration. For the first time, the lawyer-theologian took up pastoral duties such as baptisms, weddings, and church services.

Reading from the first chapter of Institutes of the Christian Religion in the original Latin, with English subtitles

During late 1536, Farel drafted a confession of faith, and Calvin wrote separate articles on reorganising the church in Geneva. On 16 January 1537, Farel and Calvin presented their Articles concernant l'organisation de l'église et du culte à Genève (Articles on the Organisation of the Church and its Worship at Geneva) to the city council. The document described the manner and frequency of their celebrations of the Eucharist, the reason for, and the method of, excommunication, the requirement to subscribe to the confession of faith, the use of congregational singing in the liturgy, and the revision of marriage laws. The council accepted the document on the same day.

As the year progressed, Calvin and Farel's reputation with the council began to suffer. The council was reluctant to enforce the subscription requirement, as only a few citizens had subscribed to their confession of faith. On 26 November, the two ministers hotly debated the council over the issue. Furthermore, France was taking an interest in forming an alliance with Geneva and as the two ministers were Frenchmen, councillors had begun to question their loyalty. Finally, a major ecclesiastical-political quarrel developed when the city of Bern, Geneva's ally in the reformation of the Swiss churches, proposed to introduce uniformity in the church ceremonies. One proposal required the use of unleavened bread for the Eucharist. The two ministers were unwilling to follow Bern's lead and delayed the use of such bread until a synod in Zurich could be convened to make the final decision. The council ordered Calvin and Farel to use unleavened bread for the Easter Eucharist. In protest, they refused to administer communion during the Easter service. This caused a riot during the service. The next day, the council told Farel and Calvin to leave Geneva.

Farel and Calvin then went to Bern and Zurich to plead their case. The resulting synod in Zurich placed most of the blame on Calvin for not being sympathetic enough toward the people of Geneva. It asked Bern to mediate with the aim of restoring the two ministers. The Geneva council refused to readmit the two men, who then took refuge in Basel. Subsequently, Farel received an invitation to lead the church in Neuchâtel. Calvin was invited to lead a church of French refugees in Strasbourg by that city's leading reformers, Martin Bucer and Wolfgang Capito. Initially, Calvin refused because Farel was not included in the invitation, but relented when Bucer appealed to him. By September 1538 Calvin had taken up his new position in Strasbourg, fully expecting that this time it would be permanent; a few months later, he applied for and was granted citizenship of the city.

=== Minister in Strasbourg (1538–1541) ===
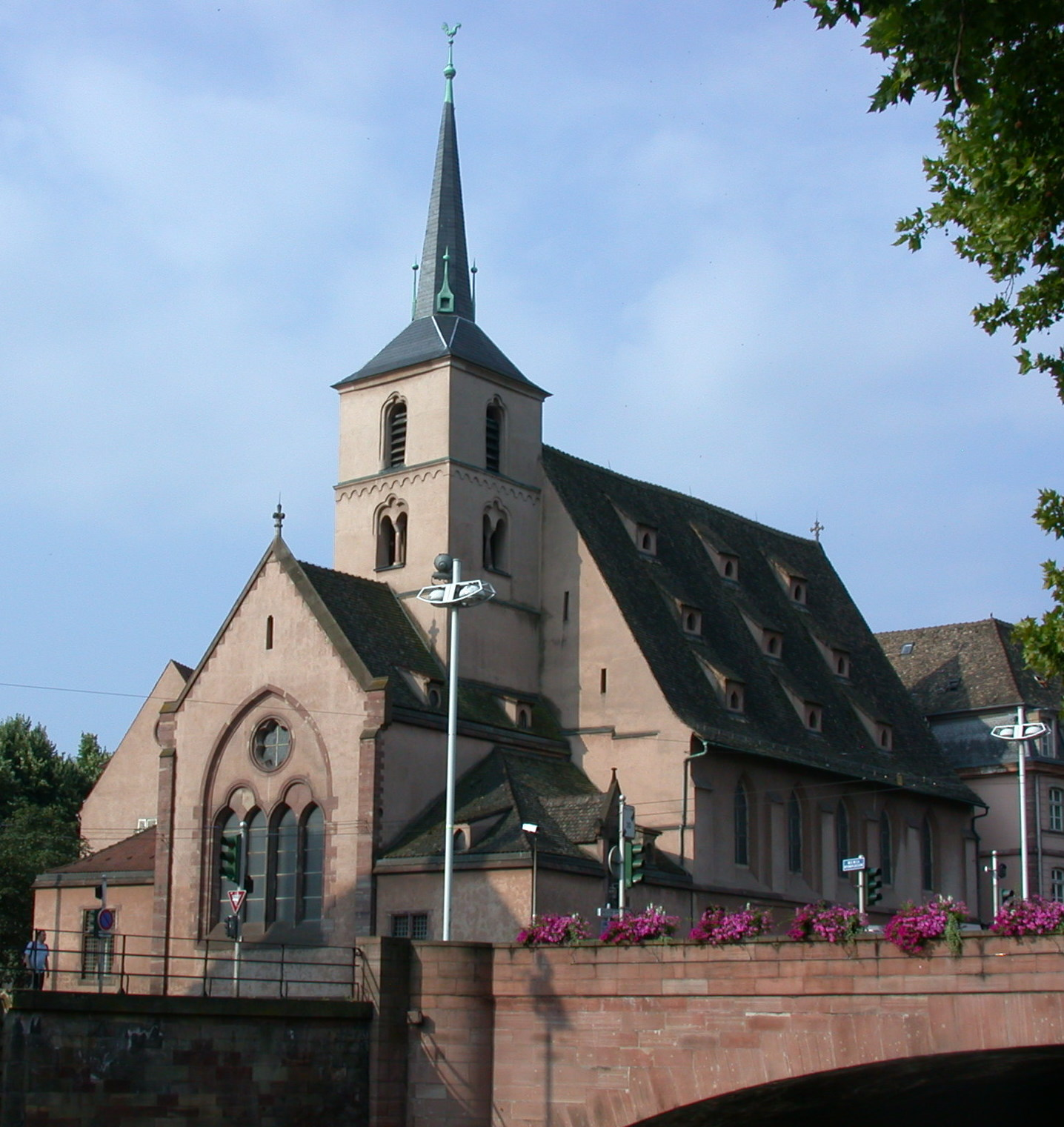
Saint Nicholas Church, Strasbourg, where Calvin preached in 1538. The building was architecturally modified in the 19th century.

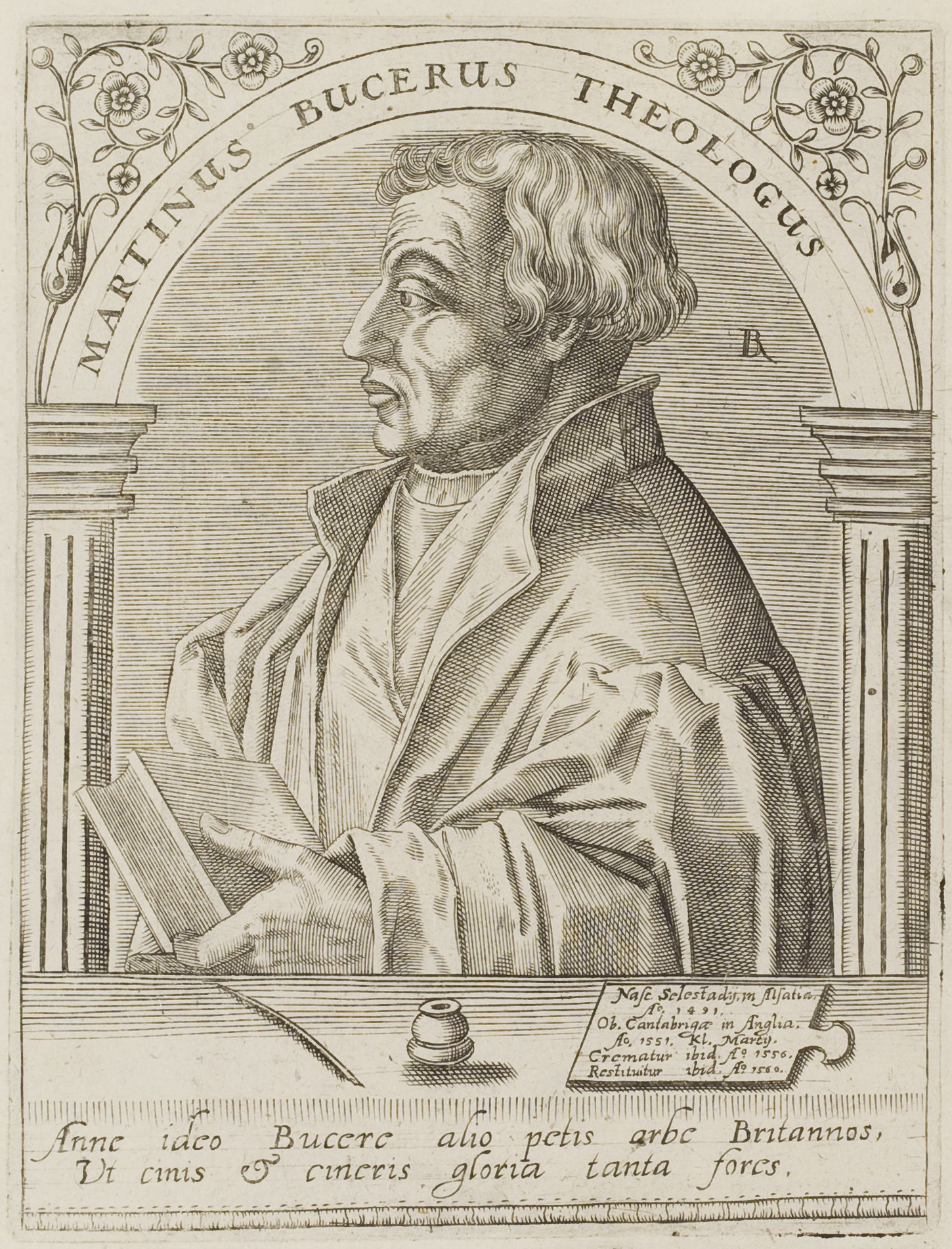
Martin Bucer invited Calvin to Strasbourg after he was expelled from Geneva. Illustration by Jean-Jacques Boissard.

During his time in Strasbourg, Calvin was not attached to one particular church, but held his office successively in the Saint-Nicolas Church, the Sainte-Madeleine Church and the former Dominican Church, renamed the Temple Neuf. (All of these churches still exist, but none are in the architectural state of Calvin's days.) Calvin ministered to 400–500 members in his church. He preached or lectured every day, with two sermons on Sunday. Communion was celebrated monthly and congregational singing of the psalms was encouraged. He also worked on the second edition of the Institutes. Calvin was dissatisfied with its original structure as a catechism, a primer for young Christians.

For the second edition, published in 1539, Calvin changed its format in favour of systematically presenting the main doctrines from the Bible. In the process, the book was enlarged from six chapters to seventeen. He concurrently worked on another book, the Commentary on Romans, which was published in March 1540. The book was a model for his later commentaries: it included his own Latin translation from the Greek rather than the Latin Vulgate, an exegesis, and an exposition. In the dedicatory letter, Calvin praised the work of his predecessors Philipp Melanchthon, Heinrich Bullinger, and Martin Bucer, but he also took care to distinguish his own work from theirs and to criticize some of their shortcomings.

Calvin's friends urged him to marry. Calvin took a prosaic view, writing to one correspondent:

I, who have the air of being so hostile to celibacy, I am still not married and do not know whether I will ever be. If I take a wife it will be because, being better freed from numerous worries, I can devote myself to the Lord.

Several candidates were presented to him including one young woman from a noble family. Reluctantly, Calvin agreed to the marriage, on the condition that she would learn French. Although a wedding date was planned for March 1540, he remained reluctant and the wedding never took place. He later wrote that he would never think of marrying her, "unless the Lord had entirely bereft me of my wits". Instead, that August, he married Idelette de Bure, a widow who had two children from her first marriage.

Geneva reconsidered its expulsion of Calvin. Church attendance had dwindled and the political climate had changed; as Bern and Geneva quarrelled over land, their alliance frayed. When Cardinal Jacopo Sadoleto wrote a letter to the city council inviting Geneva to return to the Catholic faith, the council searched for an ecclesiastical authority to respond to him. At first Pierre Viret was consulted, but when he refused, the council asked Calvin. He agreed and his Responsio ad Sadoletum (Letter to Sadoleto) strongly defended Geneva's position concerning reforms in the church. On 21 September 1540 the council commissioned one of its members, Ami Perrin, to find a way to recall Calvin. An embassy reached Calvin while he was at a colloquy, a conference to settle religious disputes, in Worms. His reaction to the suggestion was one of horror in which he wrote, "Rather would I submit to death a hundred times than to that cross on which I had to perish daily a thousand times over."

Calvin also wrote that he was prepared to follow the Lord's calling. A plan was drawn up in which Viret would be appointed to take temporary charge in Geneva for six months while Bucer and Calvin would visit the city to determine the next steps. The city council pressed for the immediate appointment of Calvin in Geneva. By mid-1541, Strasbourg decided to lend Calvin to Geneva for six months. Calvin returned on 13 September 1541 with an official escort and a wagon for his family.

=== Reform in Geneva (1541–1549) ===
In supporting Calvin's proposals for reforms, the council of Geneva passed the Ordonnances ecclésiastiques (Ecclesiastical Ordinances) on 20 November 1541. The ordinances defined four orders of ministerial function: pastors to preach and to administer the sacraments; doctors to instruct believers in the faith; elders to provide discipline; and deacons to care for the poor and needy. They also called for the creation of the Consistoire (Consistory), an ecclesiastical court composed of the elders and the ministers. The city government retained the power to summon persons before the court, and the Consistory could judge only ecclesiastical matters, having no civil jurisdiction. Originally, the court had the power to mete out sentences, with excommunication as its most severe penalty. The government contested this power, and on 19 March 1543, the council decided that all sentencing would be carried out by the government.

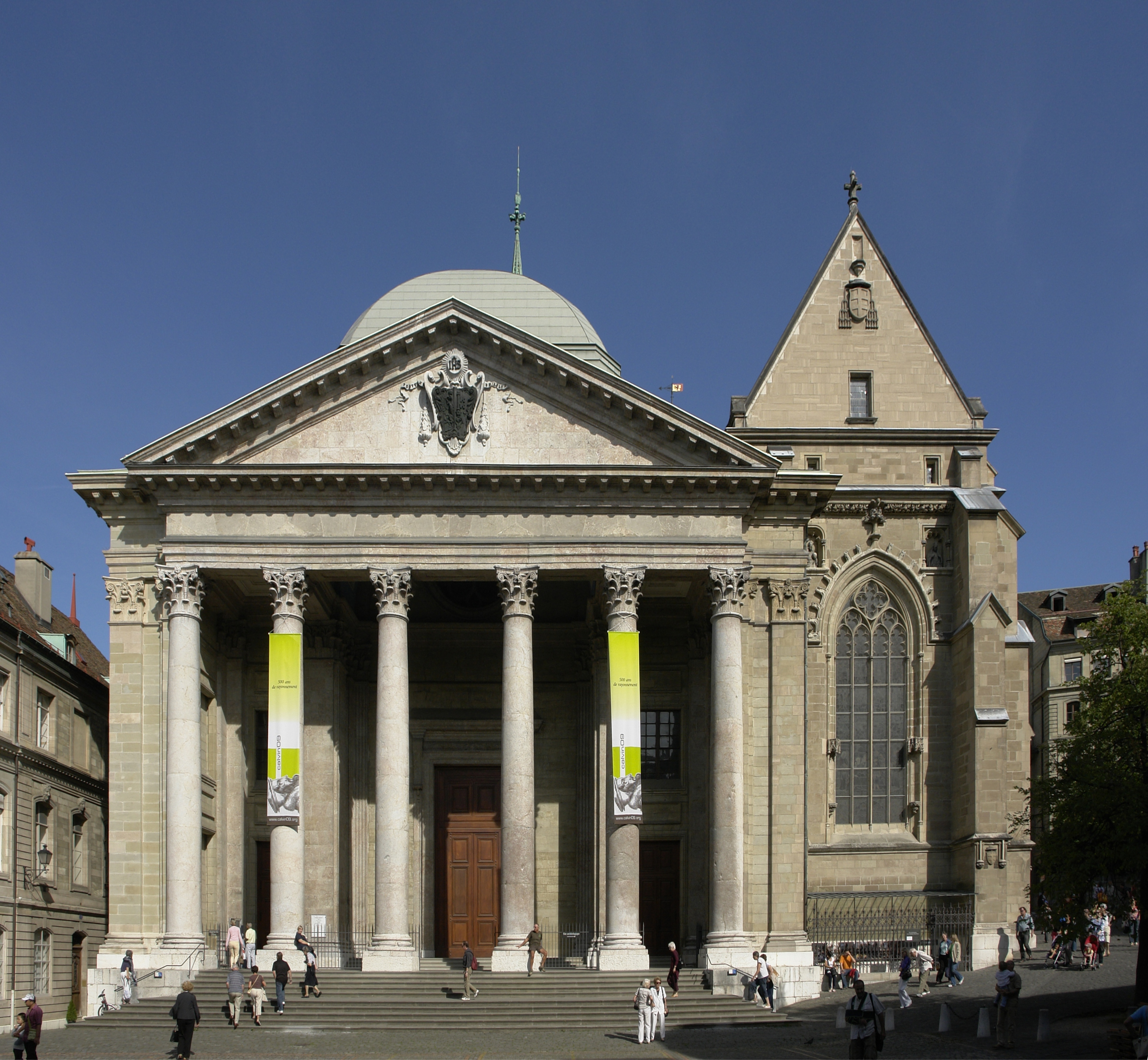
Calvin preached at St. Pierre Cathedral, the main church in Geneva.

In 1542, Calvin adapted a service book used in Strasbourg, publishing La Forme des Prières et Chants Ecclésiastiques (The Form of Prayers and Church Hymns). Calvin recognized the power of music, and he intended that it be used to support scripture readings. The original Strasbourg psalter contained twelve psalms by Clément Marot, and Calvin added several more hymns of his own composition in the Geneva version. At the end of 1542, Marot became a refugee in Geneva and contributed nineteen more psalms. Louis Bourgeois, also a refugee, lived and taught music in Geneva for sixteen years, and Calvin took the opportunity to add his hymns, the most famous being the Old Hundredth.

In the same year of 1542, Calvin published Catéchisme de l'Eglise de Genève (Catechism of the Church of Geneva), which was inspired by Bucer's Kurze Schrifftliche Erklärung of 1534. Calvin had written an earlier catechism during his first stay in Geneva, which was largely based on Martin Luther's Large Catechism. The first version was arranged pedagogically, describing Law, Faith, and Prayer. The 1542 version was rearranged for theological reasons, covering Faith first, then Law and Prayer.

Historians debate the extent to which Geneva was a theocracy. On the one hand, Calvin's theology clearly called for separation between church and state. Other historians have stressed the enormous political power wielded on a daily basis by the clerics.

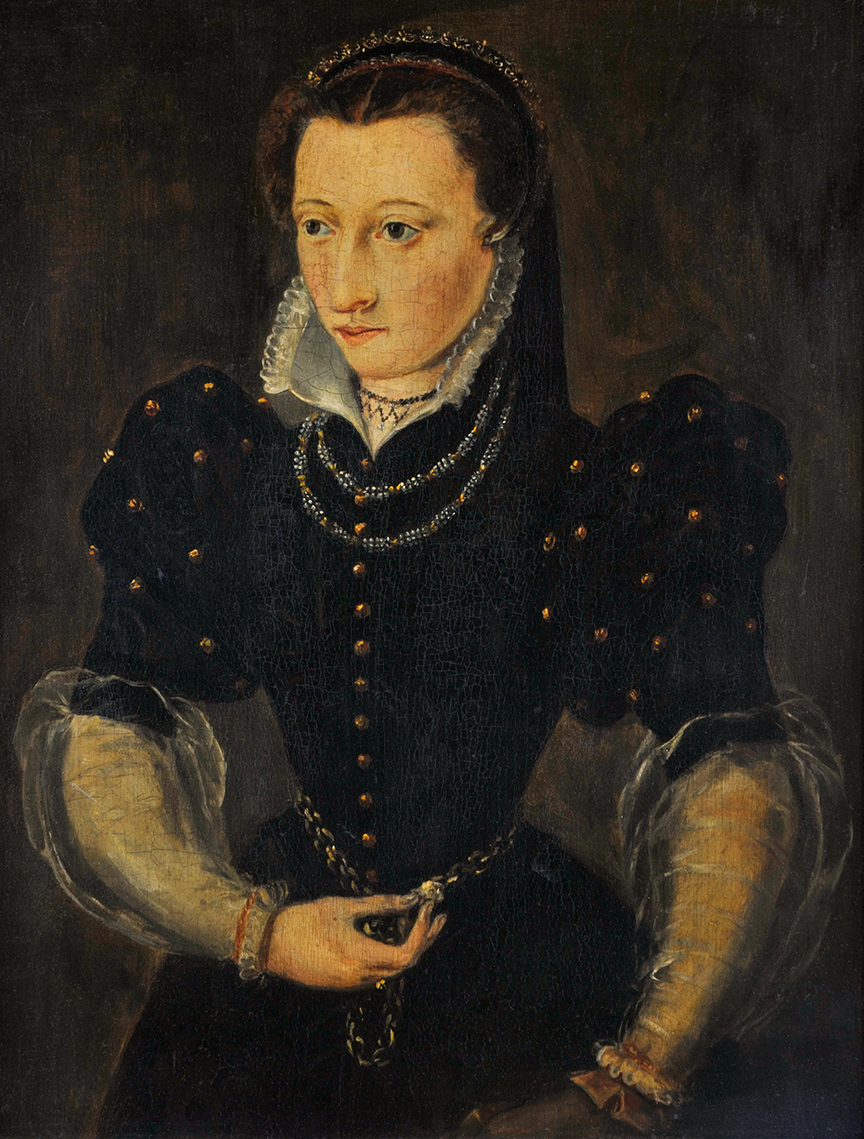
Idelette and Calvin had no children who survived infancy.

During his ministry in Geneva, Calvin preached over two thousand sermons. Initially, he preached twice on Sunday and three times during the week. This proved to be too heavy a burden, and late in 1542 the council allowed him to preach only once on Sunday. In October 1549, he was again required to preach twice on Sundays and, in addition, every weekday of alternate weeks. His sermons lasted more than an hour, and he did not use notes. An occasional secretary tried to record his sermons, but very little of his preaching was preserved before 1549. In that year, professional scribe Denis Raguenier, who had learned or developed a system of shorthand, was assigned to record all of Calvin's sermons. An analysis of his sermons by T. H. L. Parker suggests that Calvin was a consistent preacher, and his style changed very little over the years. John Calvin was also known for his thorough manner of working his way through the Bible in consecutive sermons. From March 1555 to July 1556, Calvin delivered two hundred sermons on Deuteronomy.

Very little is known about Calvin's personal life in Geneva. His house and furniture were owned by the council. The house was big enough to accommodate his family as well as Antoine's family and some servants. On 28 July 1542, Idelette gave birth to a son, Jacques, but he was born prematurely and survived only briefly. Idelette fell ill in 1545 and died on 29 March 1549. Calvin never married again. He expressed his sorrow in a letter to Viret:

I have been bereaved of the best friend of my life, of one who, if it has been so ordained, would willingly have shared not only my poverty but also my death. During her life she was the faithful helper of my ministry. From her I never experienced the slightest hindrance.

Throughout the rest of his life in Geneva, he maintained several friendships from his early years including Montmor, Cordier, Cop, Farel, Melanchthon and Bullinger.

=== Discipline and opposition (1546–1553) ===
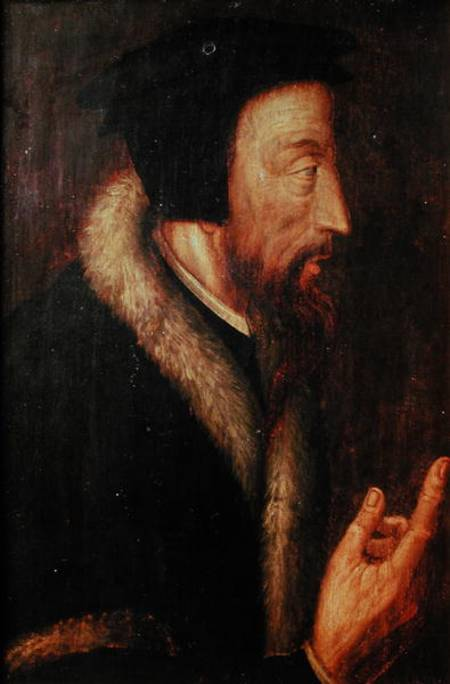
Sixteenth-century portrait of John Calvin by an unknown artist. From the collection of the Bibliothèque de Genève (Library of Geneva)

Calvin encountered bitter opposition to his work in Geneva. Around 1546, the uncoordinated forces coalesced into an identifiable group whom he referred to as the libertines, but who preferred to be called either Spirituels or Patriots. According to Calvin, these were people who felt that after being liberated through grace, they were exempted from both ecclesiastical and civil law. The group consisted of wealthy, politically powerful, and interrelated families of Geneva. At the end of January 1546, Pierre Ameaux, a maker of playing cards who had already been in conflict with the Consistory, attacked Calvin by calling him a "Picard", an epithet denoting anti-French sentiment, and accused him of false doctrine. Ameaux was punished by the council and forced to make expiation by parading through the city and begging God for forgiveness. A few months later, Ami Perrin, the man who had brought Calvin to Geneva, moved into open opposition. Perrin had married Françoise Favre, daughter of François Favre, a well-established Genevan merchant. Both Perrin's wife and father-in-law had previous conflicts with the Consistory. The court noted that many of Geneva's notables, including Perrin, had breached a law against dancing. Initially, Perrin ignored the court when he was summoned, but after receiving a letter from Calvin, he appeared before the Consistory.

By 1547, opposition to Calvin and other French refugee ministers had grown to constitute the majority of the syndics, the civil magistrates of Geneva. On 27 June, an unsigned threatening letter in Genevan dialect was found at the pulpit of St. Pierre Cathedral, where Calvin preached. Suspecting a plot against both the church and the state, the council appointed a commission to investigate. Jacques Gruet, a Genevan member of Favre's group, was arrested and incriminating evidence was found when his house was searched. Under torture, he confessed to several crimes, including writing the letter left in the pulpit, which threatened the church leaders. A civil court condemned Gruet to death and he was beheaded on 26 July. Calvin was not opposed to the civil court's decision.

The libertines continued organising opposition, insulting the appointed ministers, and challenging the authority of the Consistory. The council straddled both sides of the conflict, alternately admonishing and upholding Calvin. When Perrin was elected first syndic in February 1552, Calvin's authority appeared to be at its lowest point. After some losses before the council, Calvin believed he was defeated; on 24 July 1553, he asked the council to allow him to resign. Although the libertines controlled the council, his request was refused. The opposition realized that they could curb Calvin's authority, but they did not have enough power to banish him.

=== Michael Servetus (1553) ===
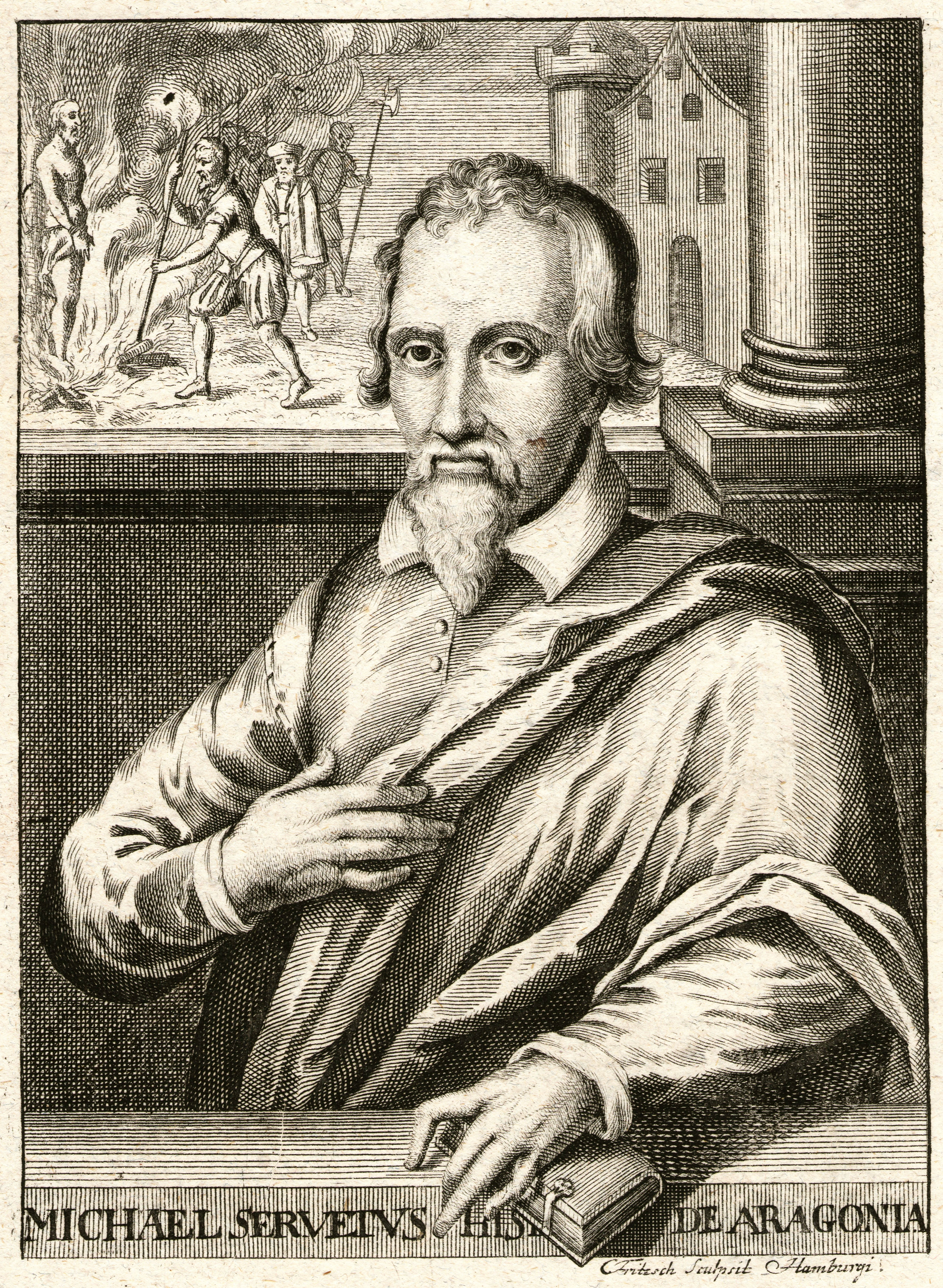
Michael Servetus exchanged many letters with Calvin until he was denounced by Calvin and executed.

The turning point in Calvin's fortunes occurred when Michael Servetus, a Spanish physician and theologian who had described pulmonary circulation in Europe, appeared in Geneva on 13 August 1553. Servetus was a fugitive after publishing Christianismi Restitutio (1553), which rejected the Trinity, original sin, and predestination.

Decades earlier, in July 1530, he disputed with Johannes Oecolampadius in Basel and was eventually expelled. He went to Strasbourg, where he published a pamphlet against the Trinity. Bucer publicly refuted it and asked Servetus to leave. After returning to Basel, Servetus published Two Books of Dialogues on the Trinity (Latin: Dialogorum de Trinitate libri duo), which caused a sensation among Reformers and Catholics alike. When John Calvin alerted the Inquisition in Spain about this publication, an order was issued for Servetus's arrest.

Calvin and Servetus were first brought into contact in 1546 through a common acquaintance, Jean Frellon of Lyon; they exchanged letters debating doctrine; Calvin used a pseudonym as Charles d' Espeville and Servetus used the moniker Michel de Villeneuve. Eventually, Calvin lost patience and refused to respond; by this time, Servetus had written around thirty letters to him. Calvin was particularly outraged when Servetus sent him a copy of the Institutes of the Christian Religion heavily annotated with arguments pointing to errors in the book. When Servetus mentioned that he would come to Geneva, "Espeville" (Calvin) wrote a letter to Farel on 13 February 1546, noting that if Servetus were to come, he would not assure him safe conduct: "for if he came, as far as my authority goes, I would not let him leave alive."

In 1553, Calvin's associate Guillaume de Trie sent letters to a Catholic cousin in Lyon exposing Servetus, naming him as "Michael Servetus, but he currently calls himself Villeneuve, practicing medicine", and stating that he was living in Vienne. When the inquisitor-general of France learned that Servetus was hiding in Vienne, according to Calvin, under an assumed name, he contacted Cardinal François de Tournon, the secretary of the archbishop of Lyon, to take up the matter. Servetus was arrested and taken in for questioning. His letters to Calvin were presented as evidence of heresy, but he denied having written them, and later said he was not sure it was his handwriting. He said, after swearing before the holy gospel, that "he was Michel De Villeneuve Doctor in Medicine about 42 years old, native of Tudela of the kingdom of Navarre, a city under the obedience to the Emperor". The following day he said: "..although he was not Servetus he assumed the person of Servet for debating with Calvin". He managed to escape from prison, and the Catholic authorities sentenced him in absentia to death by slow burning.

On his way to Italy, Servetus stopped in Geneva to visit "d'Espeville", where he was recognized and arrested. Calvin's secretary, Nicholas de la Fontaine, composed a list of accusations that was submitted before the court. The prosecutor was Philibert Berthelier, a member of a libertine family and son of a famous Geneva patriot, and the sessions were led by Pierre Tissot, Perrin's brother-in-law. The libertines allowed the trial to drag on in an attempt to harass Calvin. The difficulty in using Servetus as a weapon against Calvin was that the heretical reputation of Servetus was widespread, and most of the cities in Europe were observing and awaiting the outcome of the trial. This posed a dilemma for the libertines, so on 21 August the council decided to write to other Swiss cities for their opinions, thus mitigating their own responsibility for the final decision. While waiting for the responses, the council also asked Servetus if he preferred to be judged in Vienne or in Geneva. He begged to stay in Geneva. On 20 October, the replies from Zurich, Basel, Bern, and Schaffhausen were read, and the council condemned Servetus as a heretic. The following day, he was sentenced to burning at the stake, the same sentence as in Vienne. Calvin asked the council that Servetus be beheaded rather than burned, a request Farel criticised as too lenient; the council refused, and on 27 October, Servetus was burnt alive at the Plateau of Champel at the edge of Geneva.

=== Securing the Protestant Reformation (1553–1555) ===
After the death of Servetus, Calvin was acclaimed a defender of Christianity, but his ultimate triumph over the libertines was still two years away. He had always insisted that the Consistory retain the power of excommunication, despite the council's past decision to take it away. During Servetus's trial, Philibert Berthelier asked the council for permission to take communion, as he had been excommunicated the previous year for insulting a minister. Calvin protested that the council did not have the legal authority to overturn Berthelier's excommunication. Unsure of how the council would rule, he hinted in a sermon on 3 September 1553 that he might be dismissed by the authorities. The council decided to re-examine the Ordonnances and on 18 September, it voted in support of Calvin—excommunication was within the jurisdiction of the Consistory. Berthelier applied for reinstatement to another Genevan administrative assembly, the Deux Cents (Two Hundred), in November. This body reversed the council's decision and stated that the final arbiter concerning excommunication should be the council. The ministers continued to protest, and as in the case of Servetus, the opinions of the Swiss churches were sought. The affair dragged on through 1554. On 22 January 1555, the council announced the decision of the Swiss churches: the original Ordonnances were to be kept and the Consistory was to regain its official powers.

The libertines' downfall began with the February 1555 elections. By then, many of the French refugees had been granted citizenship, and with their support, Calvin's partisans elected the majority of the syndics and the councillors. On 16 May, the libertines took to the streets in a drunken protest and attempted to burn down a house that was supposedly full of Frenchmen. The syndic Henri Aulbert tried to intervene, carrying with him the baton of office that symbolized his power. Perrin seized the baton and waved it over the crowd, which gave the appearance that he was taking power and initiating a coup d'état. The insurrection was soon over when another syndic appeared and ordered Perrin to go with him to the town hall. Perrin and other leaders were forced to flee the city. With the approval of Calvin, the other plotters who remained in the city were found and executed. The opposition to Calvin's church polity came to an end.

=== Final years (1555–1564) ===
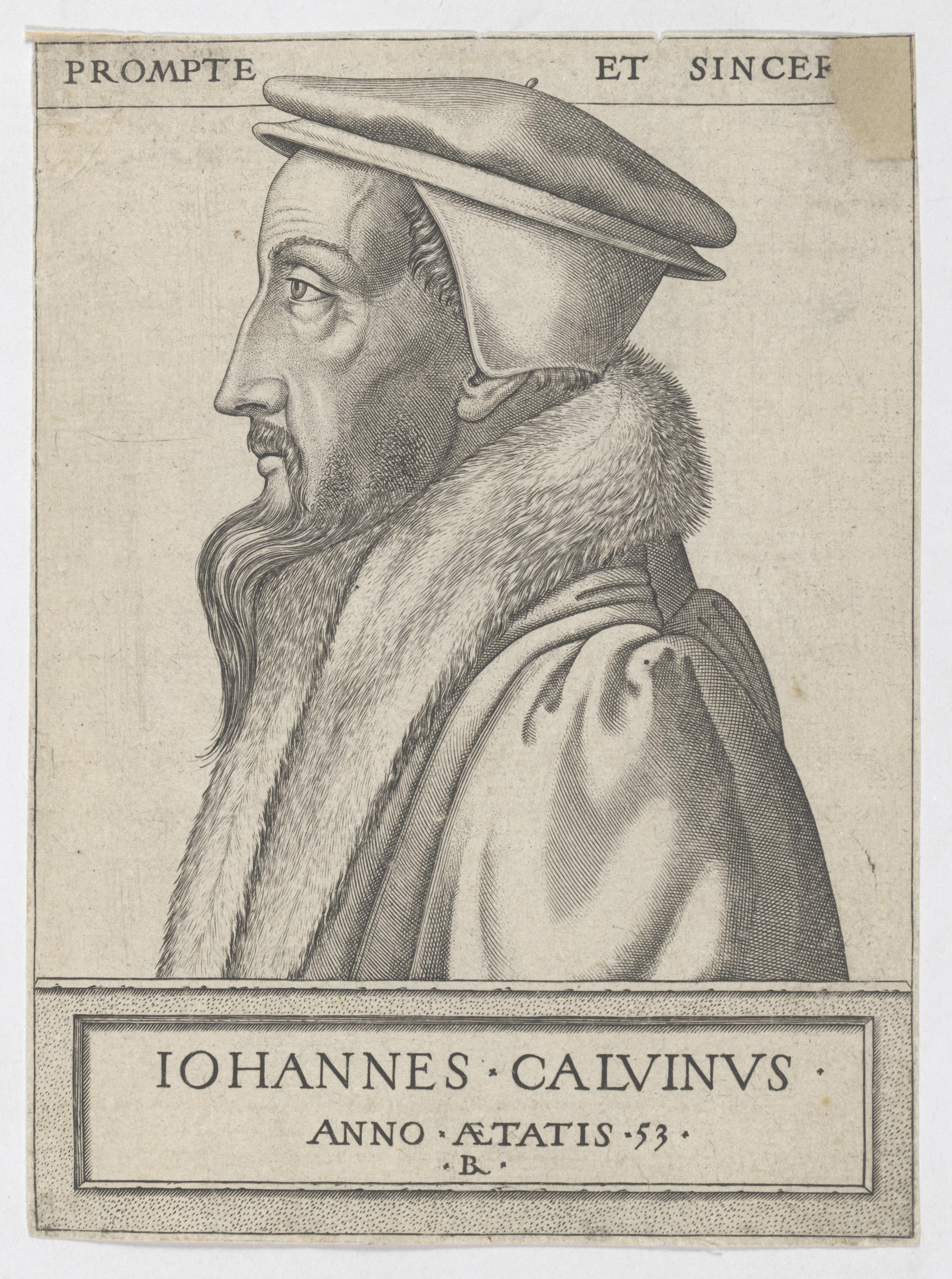
John Calvin at 53 years old in an engraving by René Boyvin

Calvin's authority was practically uncontested during his final years, and he enjoyed an international reputation as a reformer distinct from Martin Luther. Initially, Luther and Calvin had mutual respect. A doctrinal conflict had developed between Luther and Zurich reformer Huldrych Zwingli on the interpretation of the eucharist. Calvin's opinion on the issue forced Luther to place him in Zwingli's camp. Calvin actively participated in the polemics that were exchanged between the Lutheran and Reformed branches of the Reformation movement. At the same time, Calvin was dismayed by the lack of unity among the reformers. He took steps toward rapprochement with Bullinger by signing the Consensus Tigurinus, a concordat between the Zurich and Geneva churches. He reached out to England when Archbishop of Canterbury Thomas Cranmer called for an ecumenical synod of all the evangelical churches. Calvin praised the idea, but ultimately, Cranmer was unable to bring it to fruition.

Calvin sheltered Marian exiles (those who fled the reign of Catholic Mary I in England) in Geneva starting in 1555. Under the city's protection, they were able to form their own reformed church under John Knox and William Whittingham and eventually carried Calvin's ideas on doctrine and polity back to England and Scotland.

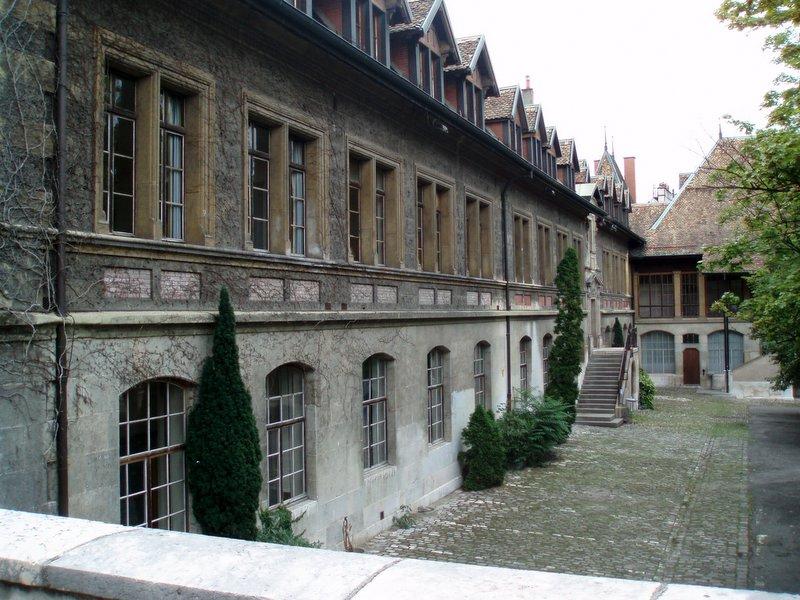
The Collège Calvin is now a college preparatory school for the Swiss Maturité.

Within Geneva, Calvin's main concern was the creation of a collège, an institute for the education of children. A site for the school was selected on 25 March 1558, and it opened the following year on 5 June 1559. Although the school was a single institution, it was divided into two parts: a grammar school called the collège or schola privata and an advanced school called the académie or schola publica. Calvin tried to recruit two professors for the institute, Mathurin Cordier, his old friend and Latin scholar who was now based in Lausanne, and Emmanuel Tremellius, the former Regius professor of Hebrew in Cambridge. Neither was available, but he succeeded in obtaining Theodore Beza as rector. Within five years, there were 1,200 students in the grammar school and 300 in the advanced school. The collège eventually became the Collège Calvin, one of the college preparatory schools of Geneva; the académie became the University of Geneva.

==== Impact on France ====
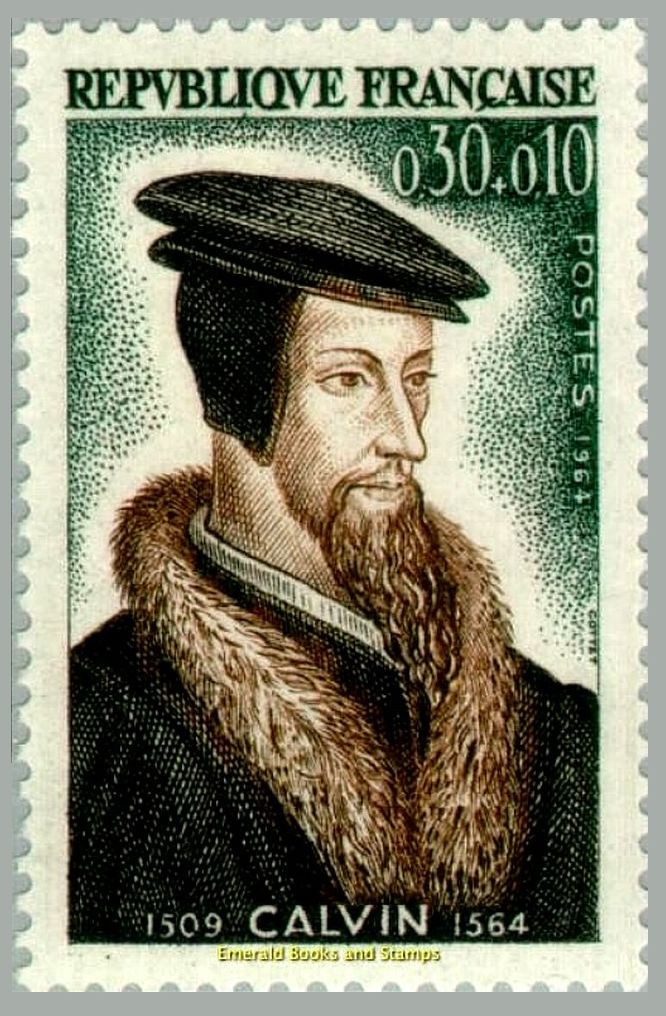
France issued a postage stamp in Calvin's honor, issued in 1964, on the 400th anniversary of his death

Calvin was deeply committed to reforming his homeland, France. The Protestant movement had been energetic, but lacked central organisational direction. With financial support from the church in Geneva, Calvin turned his enormous energies toward uplifting the French Protestant cause. As one historian explains:

He supplied the dogma, the liturgy, and the moral ideas of the new religion, and he also created ecclesiastical, political, and social institutions in harmony with it. A born leader, he followed up his work with personal appeals. His vast correspondence with French Protestants shows not only much zeal but infinite pains and considerable tact and driving home the lessons of his printed treatises.

Between 1555 and 1562, more than 100 ministers were sent to France. Nevertheless French King Henry II severely persecuted Protestants under the Edict of Chateaubriand and when the French authorities complained about the missionary activities, the city fathers of Geneva disclaimed official responsibility.

=== Last illness ===
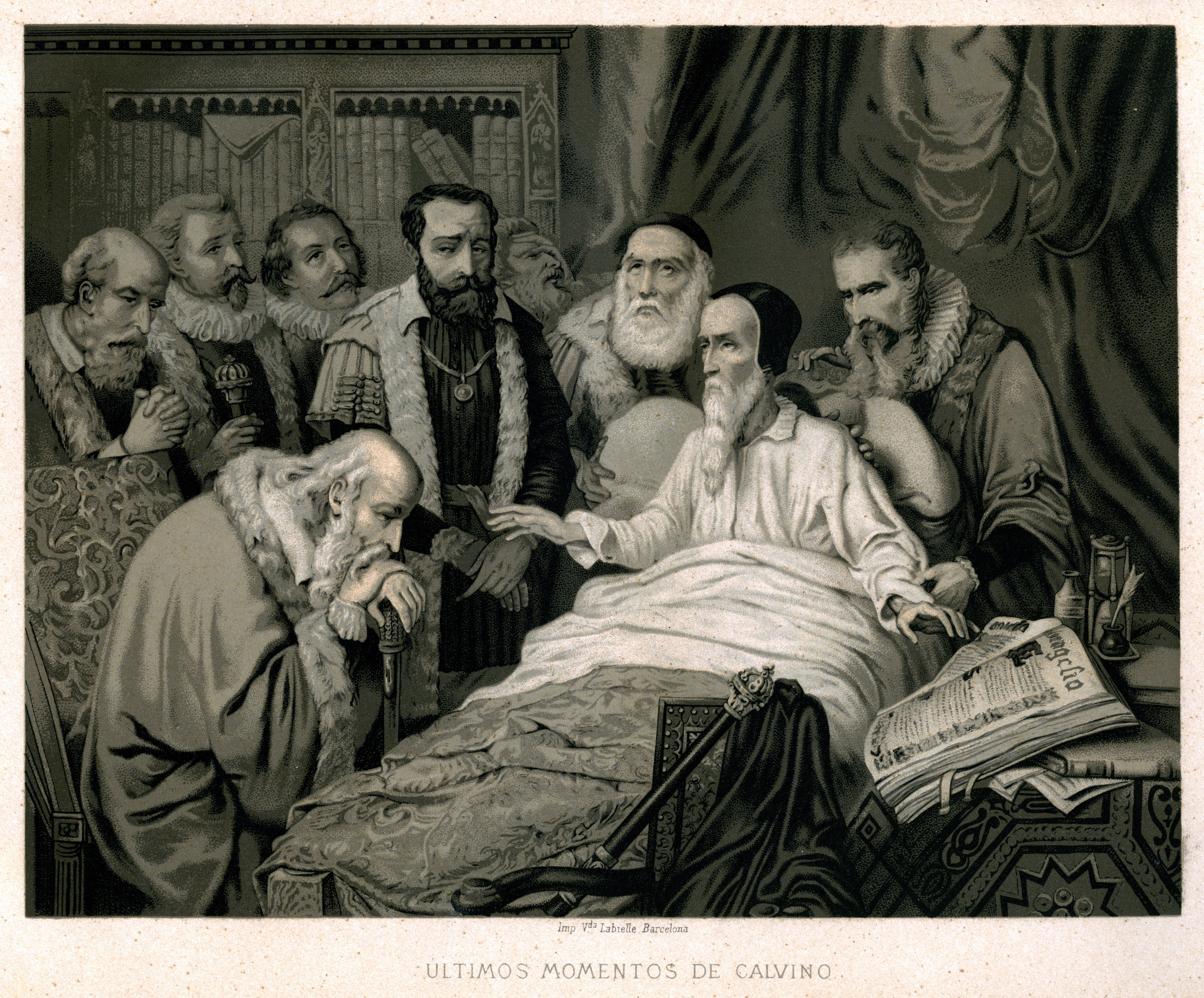
The last moments of Calvin (Barcelona: Montaner y Simón, 1880–1883)

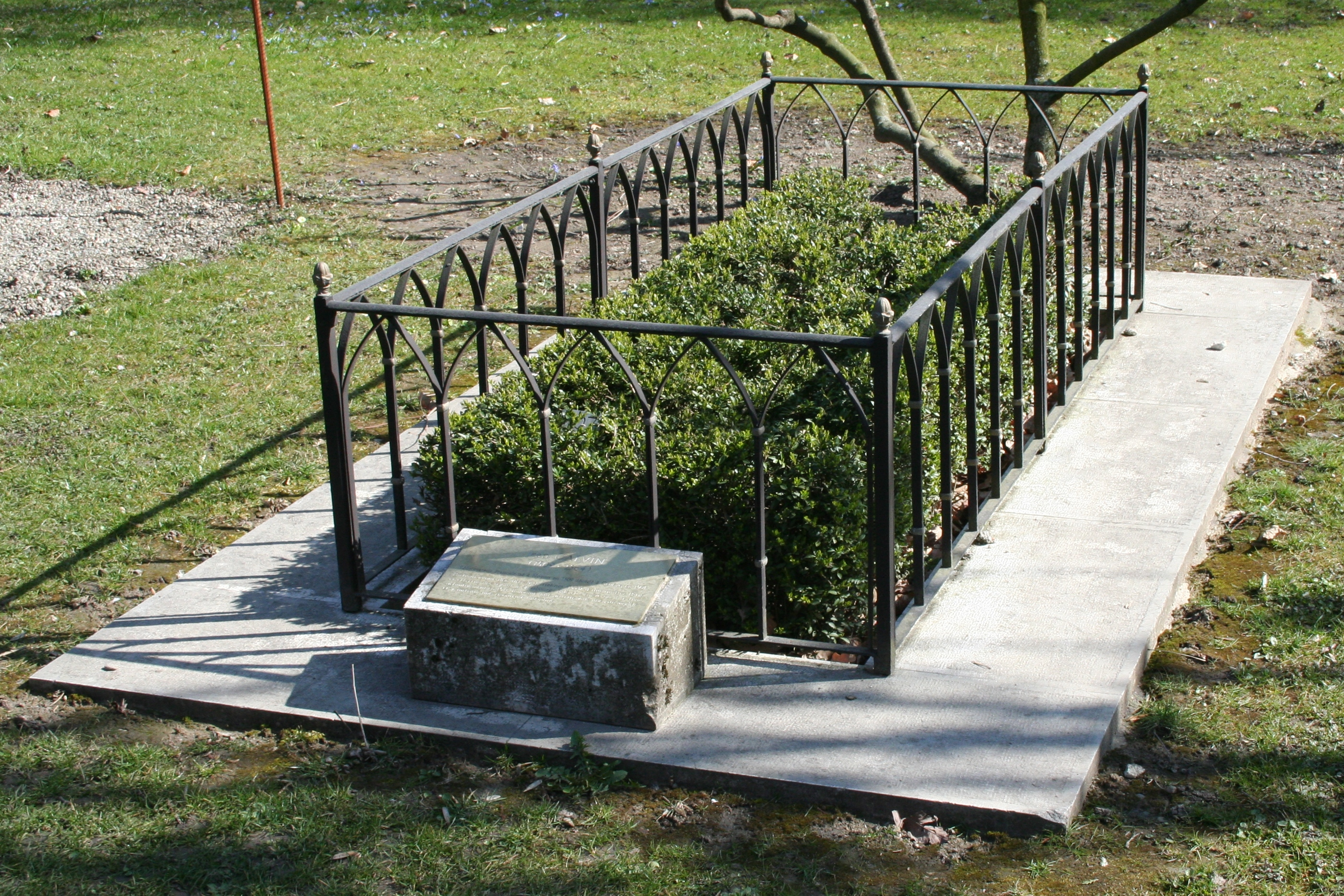
Traditional grave of Calvin in the Cimetière de Plainpalais in Geneva; the exact location of his grave is unknown.

In late 1558, Calvin became ill with a fever. Since he was afraid that he might die before completing the final revision of the Institutes, he forced himself to work. The final edition was greatly expanded to the extent that Calvin referred to it as a new work. The expansion from the 21 chapters of the previous edition to 80 was due to the extended treatment of existing material rather than the addition of new topics. Shortly after he recovered, he strained his voice while preaching, which brought on a violent fit of coughing. He burst a blood vessel in his lungs, and his health steadily declined. He preached his final sermon in St. Pierre on 6 February 1564. On 25 April, he made his will, in which he left small sums to his family and to the collège. A few days later, the ministers of the church came to visit him, and he bade his final farewell, which was recorded in Discours d'adieu aux ministres. He recounted his life in Geneva, sometimes recalling bitterly some of the hardships he had suffered. Calvin died on 27 May 1564, aged 54. At first, his body lay in state, but since numerous people came to see it, the reformers were afraid that they would be accused of fostering a new saint's cult. On the following day, he was buried in an unmarked grave in the Cimetière des Rois. The exact location of the grave is unknown; a stone was added in the 19th century to mark a grave traditionally thought to be Calvin's.

== Theology ==
Calvin developed his theology in his biblical commentaries as well as his sermons and treatises, but the most comprehensive expression of his views is found in his magnum opus, the Institutes of the Christian Religion. He intended that the book be used as a summary of his views on Christian theology and that it be read in conjunction with his commentaries. The various editions of that work spanned nearly his entire career as a reformer, and the successive revisions of the book show that his theology changed very little from his youth to his death. The first edition from 1536 consisted of only six chapters. The second edition, published in 1539, was three times as long because he added chapters on subjects that appear in Melanchthon's Loci Communes. In 1543, he again added new material and expanded a chapter on the Apostles' Creed. The final edition of the Institutes appeared in 1559. By then, the work consisted of four books of eighty chapters, and each book was named after statements from the creed: Book 1 on God the Creator, Book 2 on the Redeemer in Christ, Book 3 on receiving the Grace of Christ through the Holy Spirit, and Book 4 on the Society of Christ or the Church.

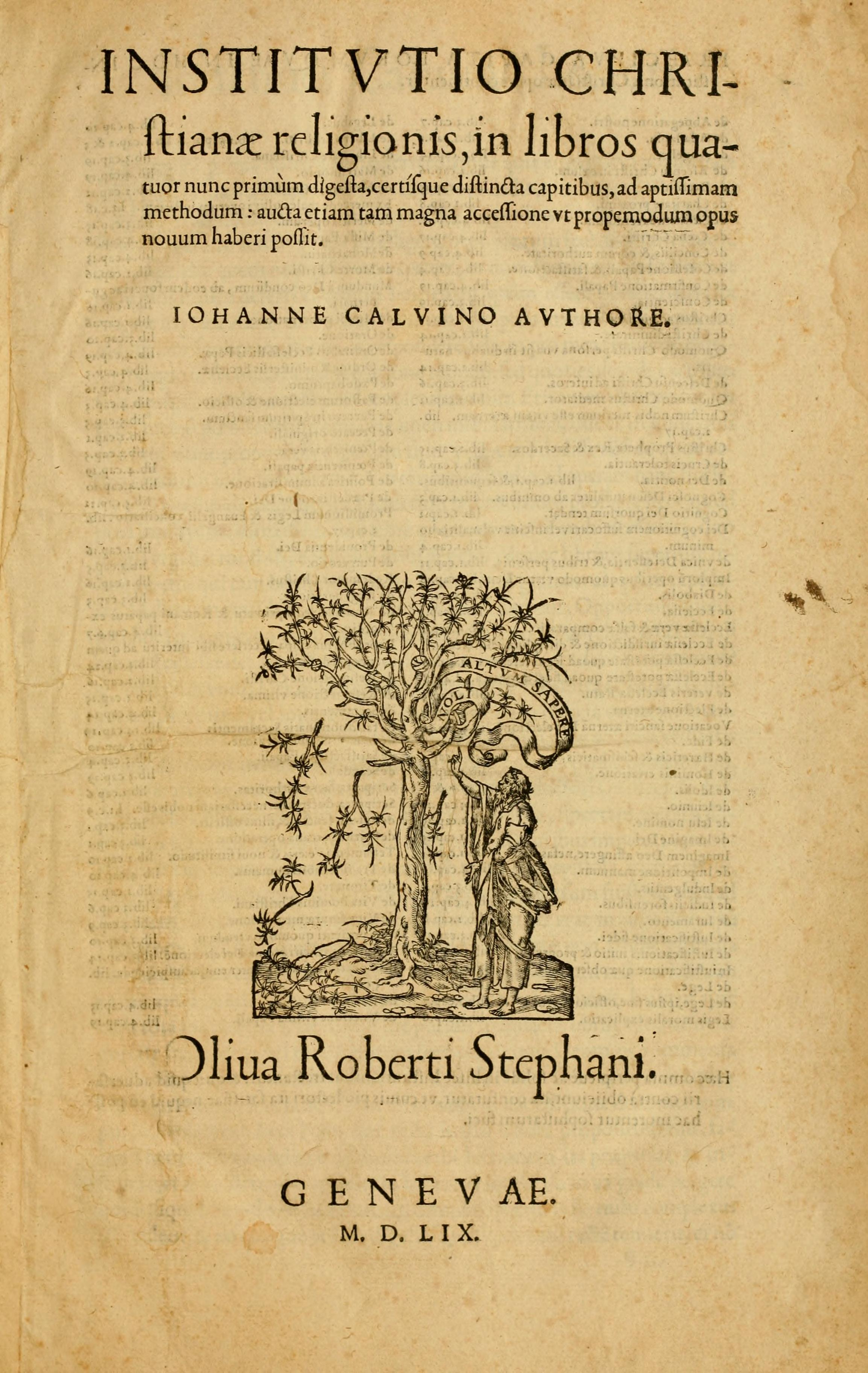
Title page from the final edition of Calvin's magnum opus, Institutio Christiane Religionis, which summarises his theology

The first statement in the Institutes acknowledges its central theme. It states that human wisdom consists of two parts: the knowledge of God and of ourselves. Calvin argues that the knowledge of God is not inherent in humanity nor can it be discovered by observing this world. The only way to obtain it is to study scripture. Calvin writes, "For anyone to arrive at God the Creator, he needs Scripture as his Guide and Teacher." He does not try to prove the authority of scripture but rather describes it as autopiston or self-authenticating. He defends the trinitarian view of God and, in a strong polemical stand against the Catholic Church, argues that images of God lead to idolatry. John Calvin famously said "the human heart is a perpetual idol factory". At the end of the first book, he offers his views on providence, writing, "By his Power God cherishes and guards the World which he made and by his Providence rules its individual Parts." Humans are unable to fully comprehend why God performs any particular action, but whatever good or evil people may practice, their efforts always result in the execution of God's will and judgments.

The second book includes several essays on original sin and the fall of man, which directly refer to Augustine, who developed these doctrines. He often cited the Church Fathers to defend the reformed cause against the charge that the reformers were creating new theology. In Calvin's view, sin began with the fall of Adam and propagated to all of humanity. The domination of sin is complete to the point that people are driven to evil. Thus fallen humanity is in need of the redemption that can be found in Christ. But before Calvin expounded on this doctrine, he described the special situation of the Jews who lived during the time of the Old Testament. God made a covenant with Abraham, promising the coming of Christ. Hence, the Old Covenant was not in opposition to Christ, but was rather a continuation of God's promise. Calvin then describes the New Covenant using the passage from the Apostles' Creed that describes Christ's suffering under Pontius Pilate and his return to judge the living and the dead. For Calvin, the whole course of Christ's obedience to the Father removed the discord between humanity and God.

In the third book, Calvin describes how the spiritual union of Christ and humanity is achieved. He first defines faith as the firm and certain knowledge of God in Christ. The immediate effects of faith are repentance and the remission of sin. This is followed by spiritual regeneration, which returns the believer to the state of holiness before Adam's transgression. Complete perfection is unattainable in this life, and the believer should expect a continual struggle against sin. Several chapters are then devoted to the subject of justification by faith alone. He defined justification as "the acceptance by which God regards us as righteous whom he has received into grace." In this definition, it is clear that it is God who initiates and carries through the action and that people play no role; God is completely sovereign in salvation. Near the end of the book, Calvin describes and defends the doctrine of predestination, a doctrine advanced by Augustine in opposition to the teachings of Pelagius. Fellow theologians who followed the Augustinian tradition on this point included Thomas Aquinas and Martin Luther, though Calvin's formulation of the doctrine went further than the tradition that went before him. The principle, in Calvin's words, is that "All are not created on equal terms, but some are preordained to eternal life, others to eternal damnation; and, accordingly, as each has been created for one or other of these ends, we say that he has been predestinated to life or to death." Calvin believed that God's absolute decree was double predestination, but he also confessed that this was a horrible decree: "The decree is dreadful indeed, I confess. (latin. "Decretum quidem horribile, fateor."; French. "Je confesse que ce decret nous doit epouvanter.")

The final book describes what he considers to be the true Church and its ministry, authority, and sacraments. He denied the papal claim to primacy and the accusation that the reformers were schismatic. For Calvin, the Church was defined as the body of believers who placed Christ at its head. By definition, there was only one "catholic" or "universal" Church. Hence, he argued that the reformers "had to leave them in order that we might come to Christ." The ministers of the Church are described from a passage from Ephesians, and they consisted of apostles, prophets, evangelists, pastors, and doctors. Calvin regarded the first three offices as temporary, limited in their existence to the time of the New Testament. The latter two offices were established in the church in Geneva. Although Calvin respected the work of the ecumenical councils, he considered them to be subject to God's Word found in scripture. He also believed that the civil and church authorities were separate and should not interfere with each other.

Calvin defined a sacrament as an earthly sign associated with a promise from God. He accepted only two sacraments as valid under the new covenant: baptism and the Lord's Supper (in opposition to the Catholic acceptance of seven sacraments). He completely rejected the Catholic doctrine of transubstantiation and the treatment of the Supper as a sacrifice. He also could not accept the Lutheran doctrine of sacramental union in which Christ was "in, with and under" the elements. His own view was close to Zwingli's symbolic view, but it was not identical. Rather than holding a purely symbolic view, Calvin noted that with the participation of the Holy Spirit, faith was nourished and strengthened by the sacrament. In his words, the eucharistic rite was "a secret too sublime for my mind to understand or words to express. I experience it rather than understand it."

=== Controversies ===
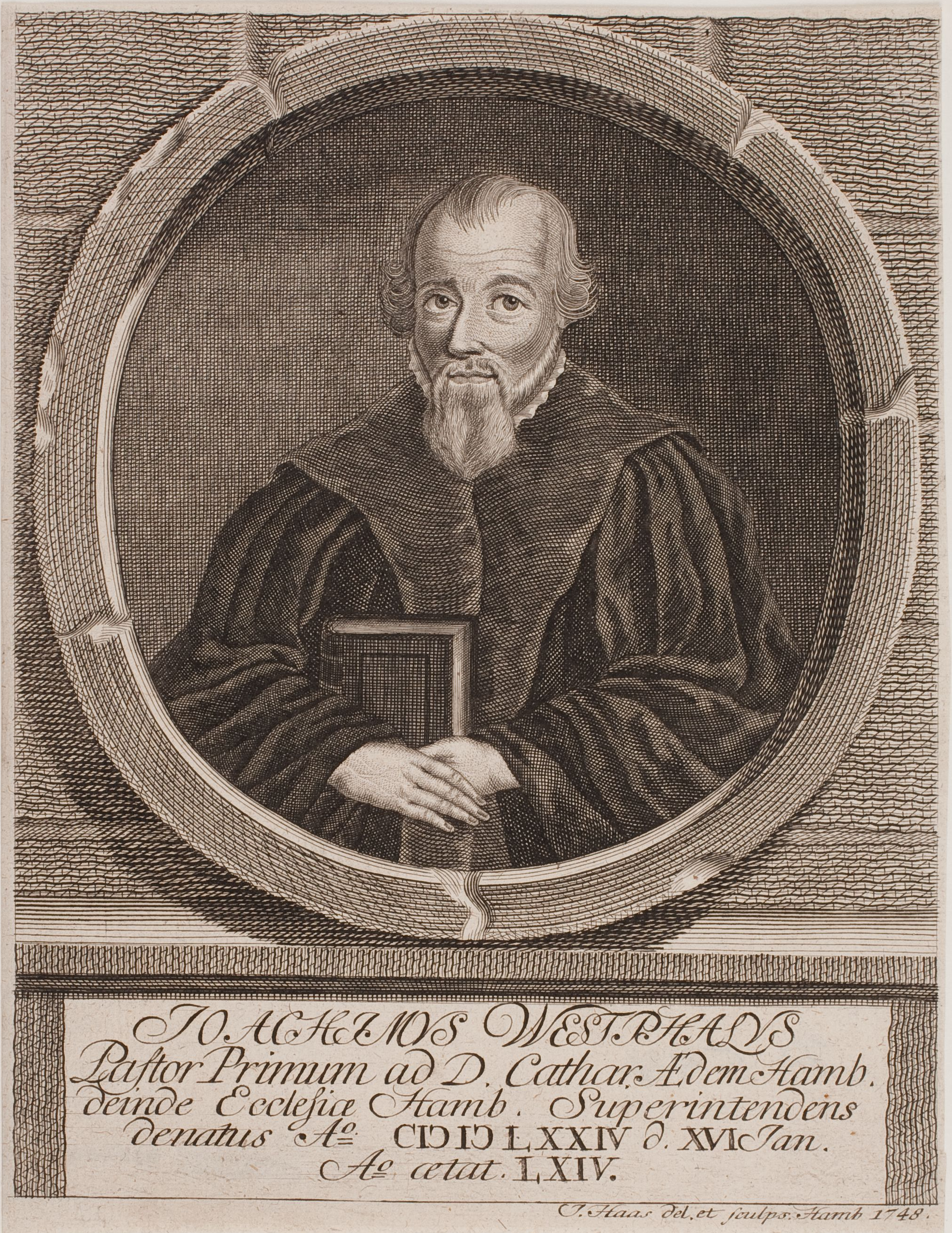
Joachim Westphal disagreed with Calvin's theology on the eucharist.

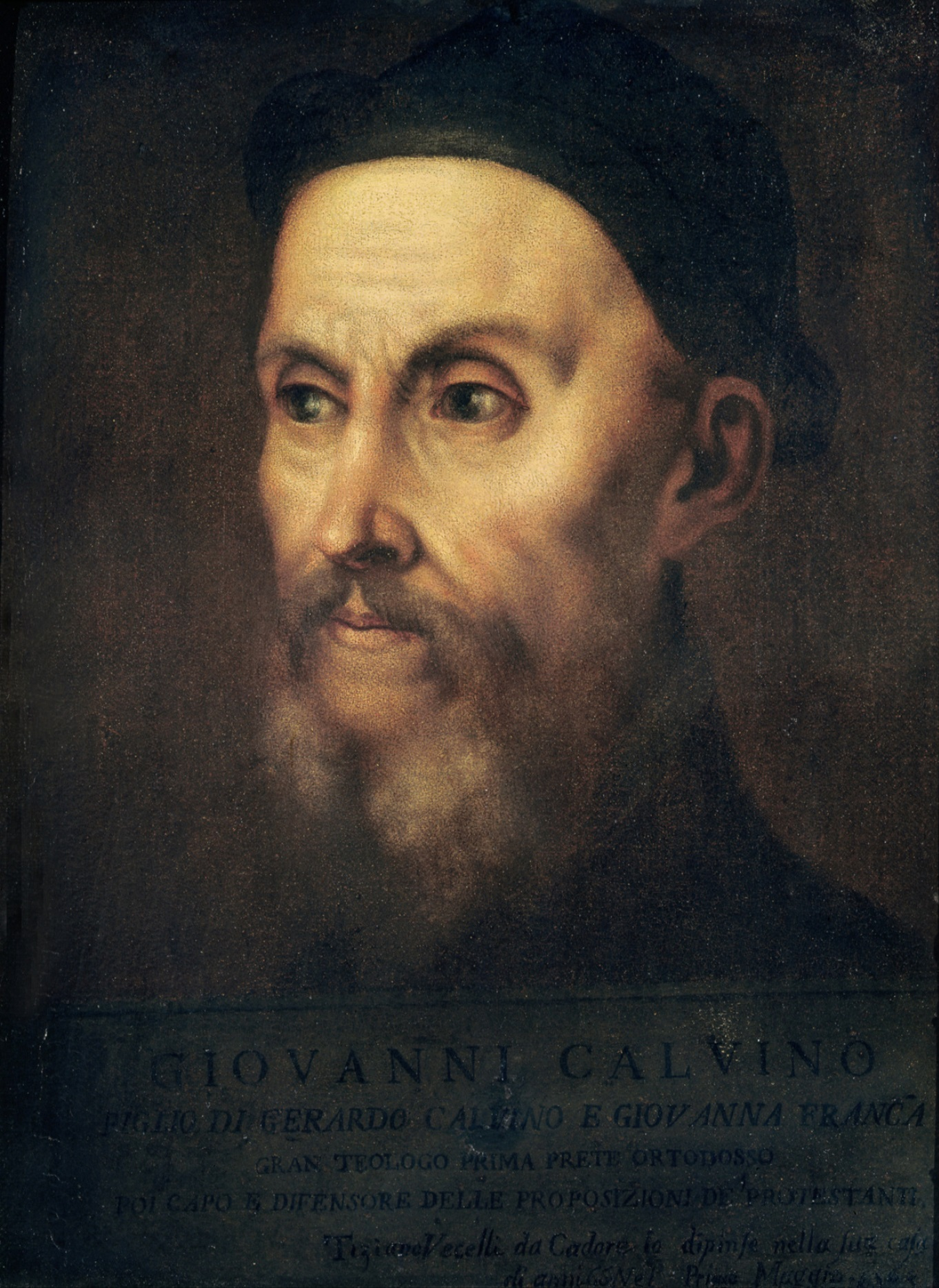
Portrait of Calvin by Titian

Calvin's theology caused controversy. Pierre Caroli, a Protestant minister in Lausanne, accused Calvin, as well as Viret and Farel, of Arianism in 1536. Calvin defended his beliefs on the Trinity in Confessio de Trinitate propter calumnias P. Caroli. In 1551 Jérôme-Hermès Bolsec, a physician in Geneva, attacked Calvin's doctrine of predestination and accused him of making God the author of sin. Bolsec was banished from the city, and after Calvin's death, wrote a biography which severely maligned Calvin's character. In the following year, Joachim Westphal, a Gnesio-Lutheran pastor in Hamburg, condemned Calvin and Zwingli as heretics in denying the eucharistic doctrine of the union of Christ's body with the elements. Calvin's Defensio sanae et orthodoxae doctrinae de sacramentis (A Defence of the Sober and Orthodox Doctrine of the Sacrament) was his response in 1555. In 1556 Justus Velsius, a Dutch dissident, held a public disputation with Calvin during his visit to Frankfurt, in which Velsius defended free will against Calvin's doctrine of predestination. Following the execution of Servetus, a close associate of Calvin, Sebastian Castellio, broke with him on the issue of the treatment of heretics. In Castellio's Treatise on Heretics (1554), he argued for a focus on Christ's moral teachings in place of the vanity of theology, and he afterwards developed a theory of tolerance based on biblical principles.

=== Calvin and the Jews ===
Scholars have debated Calvin's view of the Jews and Judaism. Some have argued that Calvin was the least antisemitic among all the major reformers of his time, especially in comparison to Martin Luther. Others have argued that Calvin was firmly within the antisemitic camp. Scholars agree that it is important to distinguish between Calvin's views toward the biblical Jews and his attitude toward contemporary Jews. In his theology, Calvin does not differentiate between God's covenant with Israel and the New Covenant. He stated, "all the children of the promise, reborn of God, who have obeyed the commands by faith working through love, have belonged to the New Covenant since the world began." Nevertheless, he was a covenant theologian and argued that the Jews are a rejected people who must embrace Jesus to re-enter the covenant.

Most of Calvin's statements on the Jewry of his era were polemical. For example, Calvin once wrote, "I have had much conversation with many Jews: I have never seen either a drop of piety or a grain of truth or ingenuousness—nay, I have never found common sense in any Jew." In this respect, he differed little from other Protestant and Catholic theologians of his day. Among his extant writings, Calvin dealt explicitly with issues of contemporary Jews and Judaism in only one treatise, Response to Questions and Objections of a Certain Jew. In it, he argued that Jews misread their own scriptures because they miss the unity of the Old and New Testaments.

== Political thought ==
The aim of Calvin's political theory was to safeguard the rights and freedoms of ordinary people. Although he was convinced that the Bible contained no blueprint for a certain form of government, Calvin favoured a combination of democracy and aristocracy (mixed government). He appreciated the advantages of democracy. To further minimize the misuse of political power, Calvin proposed to divide it among several political institutions like the aristocracy, lower estates, or magistrates in a system of checks and balances (separation of powers). Calvin held that private individuals must obey even unjust rulers, but that lesser magistrates constitutionally appointed to restrain kings have a duty to resist tyranny. State and church are separate, though they have to cooperate to the benefit of the people. Christian magistrates have to make sure that the church can fulfil its duties in freedom. In extreme cases, the magistrates have to expel or execute dangerous heretics, but nobody can be forced to become a Protestant.

Calvin thought that agriculture and the traditional crafts were normal human activities. With regard to trade and the financial world, he was more liberal than Luther, but both were strictly opposed to usury. Calvin allowed the charging of modest interest rates on loans. Like the other Reformers, Calvin understood work as a means through which believers expressed their gratitude to God for their redemption in Christ and as a service to their neighbours. Everybody was obliged to work; loafing and begging were rejected. The idea that economic success was a visible sign of God's grace played only a minor role in Calvin's thinking. It became more important in later, partly secularized forms of Calvinism and became the starting-point of Max Weber's theory about the rise of capitalism.

== Selected works ==
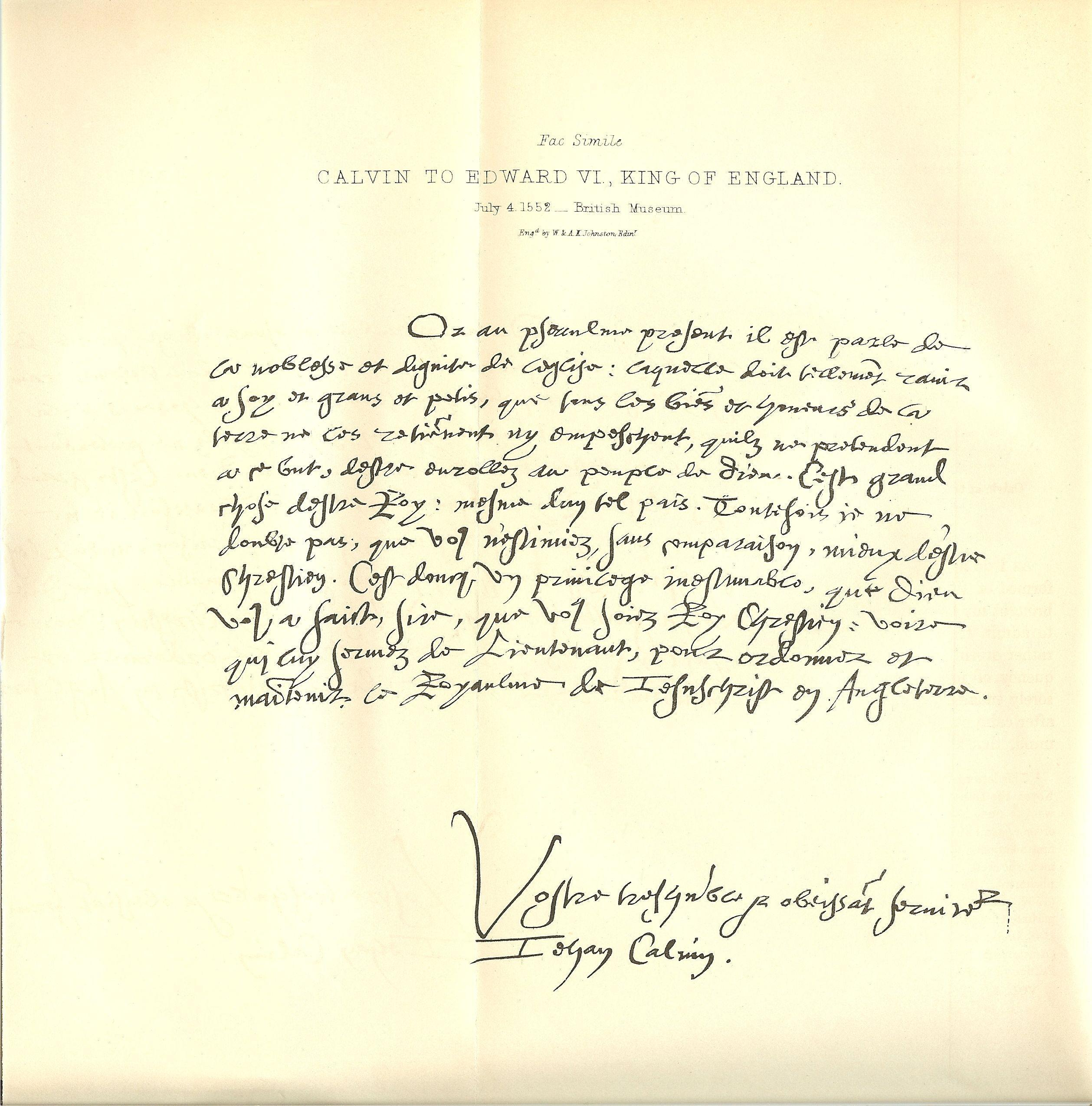
Calvin wrote many letters to religious and political leaders throughout Europe, including this one sent to Edward VI of England.

Calvin's first published work was a commentary on Seneca the Younger's De Clementia. Published at his own expense in 1532, it showed that he was a humanist in the tradition of Erasmus with a thorough understanding of classical scholarship. His first theological work, the Psychopannychia, attempted to refute the doctrine of soul sleep as promulgated by the Anabaptists. Calvin probably wrote it during the period following Cop's speech, but it was not published until 1542 in Strasbourg.

Calvin produced commentaries on most of the books of the Bible. His first commentary on Romans was published in 1540, and he planned to write commentaries on the entire New Testament. Six years passed before he wrote his second, a commentary on First Epistle to the Corinthians, but after that, he devoted more attention to reaching his goal. Within four years, he had published commentaries on all the Pauline epistles, and he also revised the commentary on Romans. He then turned his attention to the general epistles, dedicating them to Edward VI of England. By 1555, he had completed his work on the New Testament, finishing with the Acts and the Gospels (he omitted only the brief second and third Epistles of John and the Book of Revelation). For the Old Testament, he wrote commentaries on Isaiah, the books of the Pentateuch, the Psalms, and Joshua. The material for the commentaries often originated from lectures to students and ministers that he reworked for publication. From 1557 onwards, he could not find the time to continue this method, and he gave permission for his lectures to be published from stenographers' notes. These Praelectiones covered the minor prophets, Daniel, Jeremiah, Lamentations, and part of Ezekiel.

Calvin also wrote many letters and treatises. Following the Responsio ad Sadoletum, Calvin wrote an open letter at the request of Bucer to Charles V in 1543, Supplex exhortatio ad Caesarem, defending the reformed faith. This was followed by an open letter to the pope (Admonitio paterna Pauli III) in 1544, in which Calvin admonished Pope Paul III for depriving the reformers of any prospect of rapprochement. The pope proceeded to open the Council of Trent, which resulted in decrees against the reformers. Calvin refuted the decrees by producing the Acta synodi Tridentinae cum Antidoto (The synod of Trent with Antidote) in 1547. When Charles tried to find a compromise solution with the Augsburg Interim, Bucer and Bullinger urged Calvin to respond. He wrote the treatise, Vera Christianae pacificationis et Ecclesiae reformandae ratio (The true system of Christian pacification and the reformation of the Church) in 1549, in which he described the doctrines that should be upheld, including justification by faith.

Calvin provided many of the foundational documents for reformed churches, including documents on the catechism, the liturgy, and church governance. He also produced several confessions of faith to unite the churches. In 1559, he drafted the French confession of faith, the Gallic Confession, and the synod in Paris accepted it with few changes. The Belgic Confession of 1561, a Dutch confession of faith, was partly based on the Gallic Confession.

== Legacy ==
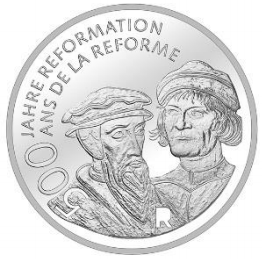
Calvin (left) and Huldrych Zwingli on a Swiss 20 franc coin commemorating the 500th anniversary of the Reformation

After the deaths of Calvin and his successor, Beza, the Geneva city council gradually gained control over areas of life that were previously in the ecclesiastical domain. Increasing secularization was accompanied by the decline of the church. Even the Geneva académie was eclipsed by universities in Leiden and Heidelberg, which became the new strongholds of Calvin's ideas, first identified as "Calvinism" by Joachim Westphal in 1552. By 1585, Geneva, once the wellspring of the reform movement, had become merely its symbol. Calvin had always warned against describing him as an "idol" and Geneva as a new "Jerusalem". He encouraged people to adapt to the environments in which they found themselves. Even during his polemical exchange with Westphal, he advised a group of French-speaking refugees, who had settled in Wesel, Germany, to integrate with the local Lutheran churches. Despite his differences with the Lutherans, he did not deny that they were members of the true Church. Calvin's recognition of the need to adapt to local conditions became an important characteristic of the Reformation movement as it spread across Europe. Due to Calvin's missionary work in France, his program of reform eventually reached the French-speaking provinces of the Netherlands. Calvinism was adopted in the Electorate of the Palatinate under Frederick III, which led to the formulation of the Heidelberg Catechism in 1563. This and the Belgic Confession were adopted as confessional standards in the first synod of the Dutch Reformed Church in 1571. Several leading divines, either Calvinist or those sympathetic to Calvinism, settled in England (Martin Bucer, Peter Martyr, and Jan Laski) and Scotland (John Knox). During the English Civil War, the Calvinistic Puritans produced the Westminster Confession, which became the confessional standard for Presbyterians in the English-speaking world.

As the Ottoman Empire did not force Muslim conversion on its conquered western territories, reformed ideas were quickly adopted in the two-thirds of Hungary they occupied (the Habsburg-ruled third part of Hungary remained Catholic). A Reformed Constitutional Synod was held in 1567 in Debrecen, the main hub of Hungarian Calvinism, where the Second Helvetic Confession was adopted as the official confession of Hungarian Calvinists.

Having established itself in Europe, the movement continued to spread to other parts of the world, including North America, South Africa, and Korea.

Calvin did not live to see the foundation of his work grow into an international movement; but his death allowed his ideas to break out of their city of origin, to succeed far beyond their borders, and to establish their own distinct character.

Calvin is recognized as a Renewer of the Church in Lutheran churches commemorated on 26 May. Calvin is also remembered in the Church of England with a commemoration on 26 May.

Voltaire wrote about Calvin, Luther and Zwingli, "If they condemned celibacy in the priests, and opened the gates of the convents, it was only to turn all society into a convent. Shows and entertainments were expressly forbidden by their religion, and for more than two hundred years, there was not a single musical instrument allowed in the city of Geneva. They condemned auricular confession, but they enjoined a public one; and in Switzerland, Scotland, and Geneva, it was performed the same as penance."

== See also ==
- Theodore Beza
- Brevitas et facilitas
- Corpus Reformatorum
- Criticism of Protestantism
- Genevan psalter
- History of Protestantism
- John Calvin's views on Mary
- Franciscus Junius (the elder)
- Wilhelm Heinrich Neuser
- Protestant refugees in Switzerland
- Swiss Reformation
- Immanuel Tremellius
- Otto Zeinenger

== Sources ==
- Baron, Salo (1972), "John Calvin and the Jews", in Feldman, Leon A. (ed.), Ancient and Medieval Jewish History, New Brunswick, New Jersey: Rutgers University Press, OCLC 463285878 (originally published 1965).
- Berg, Machiel A. van den (2009), Friends of Calvin, Grand Rapids, Mi.: William B. Eerdmans Publishing Co., ISBN 978-0-8028-6227-3
- Bouwsma, William James (1988), John Calvin: A Sixteenth-Century Portrait, New York: Oxford University Press, ISBN 978-0-19-504394-5.
- Calvin, John (1989) [1564], Institutio Christianae religionis [Institutes of the Christian Religion] (in Latin), Translated by Henry Beveridge, Grand Rapids, MI: Wm. B. Eerdmans Publishing Company
- Chung, Sung Wook (2002), Admiration and Challenge: Karl Barth's Theological Relationship with John Calvin, New York: Peter Lang, ISBN 978-0-82-045680-5.
- Chung, Sung Wook (2009), John Calvin and Evangelical Theology: Legacy and Prospect, Louisville, KY: Westminster John Knox, ISBN 978-0-82-045680-5.
- Cottret, Bernard (2000) [1995], Calvin: Biographie [Calvin: A Biography] (in French), Translated by M. Wallace McDonald, Grand Rapids, Michigan: Wm. B. Eerdmans, ISBN 978-0-8028-3159-0
- De Greef, Wulfert (2004), "Calvin's writings", in McKim, Donald K. (ed.), The Cambridge Companion to John Calvin, Cambridge: Cambridge University Press, ISBN 978-0-521-01672-8
- ———————— (2008), The Writings of John Calvin: An Introductory Guide, Louisville, Kentucky: Westminster John Knox Press, ISBN 978-0-664-23230-6
- Detmers, Achim (2006), "Calvin, the Jews, and Judaism", in Bell, Dean Phillip; Burnett, Stephen G. (eds.), Jews, Judaism, and the Reformation in Sixteenth-Century Germany, Leiden: Brill, ISBN 978-90-04-14947-2.
- DeVries, Dawn (2004), "Calvin's preaching", in McKim, Donald K. (ed.), The Cambridge Companion to John Calvin, Cambridge: Cambridge University Press, ISBN 978-0-521-01672-8
- Dyer, Thomas Henry (1850), The Life of John Calvin, London: John Murray
- Gamble, Richard C. (2004), "Calvin's controversies", in McKim, Donald K. (ed.), The Cambridge Companion to John Calvin, Cambridge: Cambridge University Press, ISBN 978-0-521-01672-8
- Ganoczy, Alexandre (2004), "Calvin's life", in McKim, Donald K. (ed.), The Cambridge Companion to John Calvin, Cambridge: Cambridge University Press, ISBN 978-0-521-01672-8
- Ganoczy, Alexandre (2005), "Calvin, John", in Hillebrand, Hans J. (ed.), The Oxford Encyclopedia of the Reformation, Oxford: Oxford University Press, ISBN 978-0-195-06493-3
- Gerrish, R. A. (2004), "The place of Calvin in Christian theology", in McKim, Donald K. (ed.), The Cambridge Companion to John Calvin, Cambridge: Cambridge University Press, ISBN 978-0-521-01672-8
- Graham, W. Fred (1971), The Constructive Revolutionary: John Calvin and His Socio-Economic Impact, Richmond, Virginia: John Knox Press, ISBN 978-0-8042-0880-2.
- Helm, Paul (2004), John Calvin's Ideas, Oxford: Oxford University Press, ISBN 978-0-19-925569-6.
- Heron, Alasdair (2005), "John Calvin", in Lacoste, Jean-Yves (ed.), Encyclopedia of Christian Theology, New York: CRC Press.
- Hesselink, I. John (2004), "Calvin's theology", in McKim, Donald K. (ed.), The Cambridge Companion to John Calvin, Cambridge: Cambridge University Press, ISBN 978-0-521-01672-8
- Holder, R. Ward (2004), "Calvin's heritage", in McKim, Donald K. (ed.), The Cambridge Companion to John Calvin, Cambridge: Cambridge University Press, ISBN 978-0-521-01672-8
- Lane, Anthony N.S. (2009), "Calvin's Institutes", A Reader's Guide, Grand Rapids: Baker Publishing Group, ISBN 978-0-8010-3731-3
- Lange van Ravenswaay, J. Marius J. (2009) [2008], "Calvin and the Jews", in Selderhuis, Herman J. (ed.), Calvijn Handboek [The Calvin Handbook] (in Dutch), Translated by Kampen Kok, Grand Rapids, Michigan: Wm. B. Eerdmans Publishing Co., ISBN 978-0-8028-6230-3
- Manetsch, Scott M. (2013), Calvin's Company of Pastors: Pastoral Care and the Emerging Reformed Church, 1536–1609, Oxford Studies in Historical Theology, New York: Oxford University Press
- McDonnell, Kilian (1967), John Calvin, the Church, and the Eucharist, Princeton: Princeton University Press, OCLC 318418.
- McGrath, Alister E. (1990), A Life of John Calvin, Oxford: Basil Blackwell, ISBN 978-0-631-16398-5.
- McNeill, John Thomas (1954), The History and Character of Calvinism, Oxford: Oxford University Press. Reprint: ISBN 978-0-19-500743-5.
- Niesel, Wilhelm (1980), The Theology of Calvin, Grand Rapids, Michigan: Baker Book House, ISBN 978-0-8010-6694-8.
- Olsen, Jeannine E. (2004), "Calvin and social-ethical issues", in McKim, Donald K. (ed.), The Cambridge Companion to John Calvin, Cambridge: Cambridge University Press, ISBN 978-0-521-01672-8
- Pak, G. Sujin (2010), The Judaizing Calvin, Oxford: Oxford University Press, ISBN 978-0-19-537192-5.
- Parker, T. H. L. (1995), Calvin: An Introduction to His Thought, London: Geoffrey Chapman, ISBN 978-0-225-66575-8.
- ——————— (1975), John Calvin, Tring, Hertfordshire, England: Lion Publishing plc, ISBN 978-0-7459-1219-6.
- ——————— (2006), John Calvin: A Biography, Oxford: Lion Hudson plc, ISBN 978-0-7459-5228-4.
- Pater, Calvin Augustus (1987), "Calvin, the Jews, and the Judaic Legacy", in Furcha, E. J. (ed.), In Honor of John Calvin: Papers from the 1986 International Calvin Symposium, Montreal: McGill University Press, ISBN 978-0-7717-0171-9.
- Pettegree, Andrew (2004), "The spread of Calvin's thought", in McKim, Donald K. (ed.), The Cambridge Companion to John Calvin, Cambridge: Cambridge University Press, ISBN 978-0-521-01672-8
- Potter, G. R.; Greengrass, M. (1983), John Calvin, London: Edward Arnold (Publishers) Ltd., ISBN 978-0-7131-6381-0.
- Steinmetz, David C. (1995), Calvin in Context, Oxford: Oxford University Press, ISBN 978-0-19-509164-9.
- ————————— (2009), "Calvin as Biblical Interpreter Among the Ancient Philosophers", Interpretation, 63 (2): 142–153, doi:10.1177/002096430906300204, S2CID 170454772

Religious titles
New institution	Moderator of the Genevan Company of Pastors; 1541–1564	Succeeded by Theodore Beza
Academic offices
New institution	Chair of theology at the Genevan Academy; 1559–1564	Succeeded by Theodore Beza
