= Catherine Philbert =

French defendant of the Poison Affair (died 1679)

Catherine Philbert, also Catherine Brunet, née Bonnières (died in June 1679) is known as a defendant of the Poison Affair (1677-1682).

== Life ==
Catherine Bonnières first married the craftsman M. Brunet, son of the musician Jean Brunet. She was the mistress of the royal court musician Philippe Rebille Philbert, but her husband Brunet, who was unaware of the affair, engaged Philbert with her daughter.

In 1673, she consulted La Voisin, who encouraged Marie Bosse to sell her a poison acquired from Magdelaine de La Grange, which Catherine Philbert used to poison her first husband: Monsieur Brunet died soon after, and she remarried to her daughters fiance Philippe Rebille Philbert.

Catherine Philbert was exposed to the authorities after the arrest of Marie Bosse and Marie Vigoreaux. She was first named by Marie Vigoreaux. She was arrested in March and accused of the murder of her first husband. She was among the first clients arrested during the Poison Affair, and the perhaps the first who formed a connection to the royal court. She was sentenced guilty as charged for the murder of her husband. She had her right hand cut off and executed by hanging in Paris in June 1679.

The case of Catherine Philbert attracted attention because of the fact that she was executed for a crime almost identical to that of Marguerite Leféron, Françoise de Dreux and Marguerite de Poulaillon, but yet she, a middle class woman, was executed while Leferon, Dreux and Poulaillon, who were all members of the upper Burgher class, were all spared the death penalty, something that demonstrated a difference in justice because of class.

== Bibliography ==
- Somerset, Anne (October 12, 2003). The Affair of the Poisons: Murder, Infanticide, and Satanism at the Court of Louis XIV. St. Martin's Press. ISBN 0-312-33017-0.
