= J.H. Filbert =

Food manufacturer based in Baltimore, Maryland

J.H. Filbert, Inc. was a company based in Baltimore, Maryland, United States that produced margarine and butter substitute products, including Mrs. Filbert's Margarine and I Can't Believe It's Not Butter!.

The company was founded by John H. Filbert, who died in 1917. His widow, Martha V. Filbert (and the namesake for Mrs. Filbert's Margarine) then took over as president, and served in that role for over thirty years, until her death in 1954.

In 1972, Central Soya acquired the privately owned company, which at that time had reached annual sales of $63 million and was the largest privately owned manufacturer in Baltimore. In 1979, Filbert invented I Can't Believe It's Not Butter! and began marketing it in 1981.

Unilever acquired Filbert in 1986 for $23 million in order to add East Coast U.S. manufacturing capacity. It continues to market some Filbert-created products.
