= Wilhelm Heinrich Neuser =

Wilhelm Heinrich Neuser (born 13 June 1926 in Siegen; died 25 June 2010 in Münster) was a German Protestant theologian, church historian, professor and a leading scholar in John Calvin research, a founder of International Congress on Calvin Research.

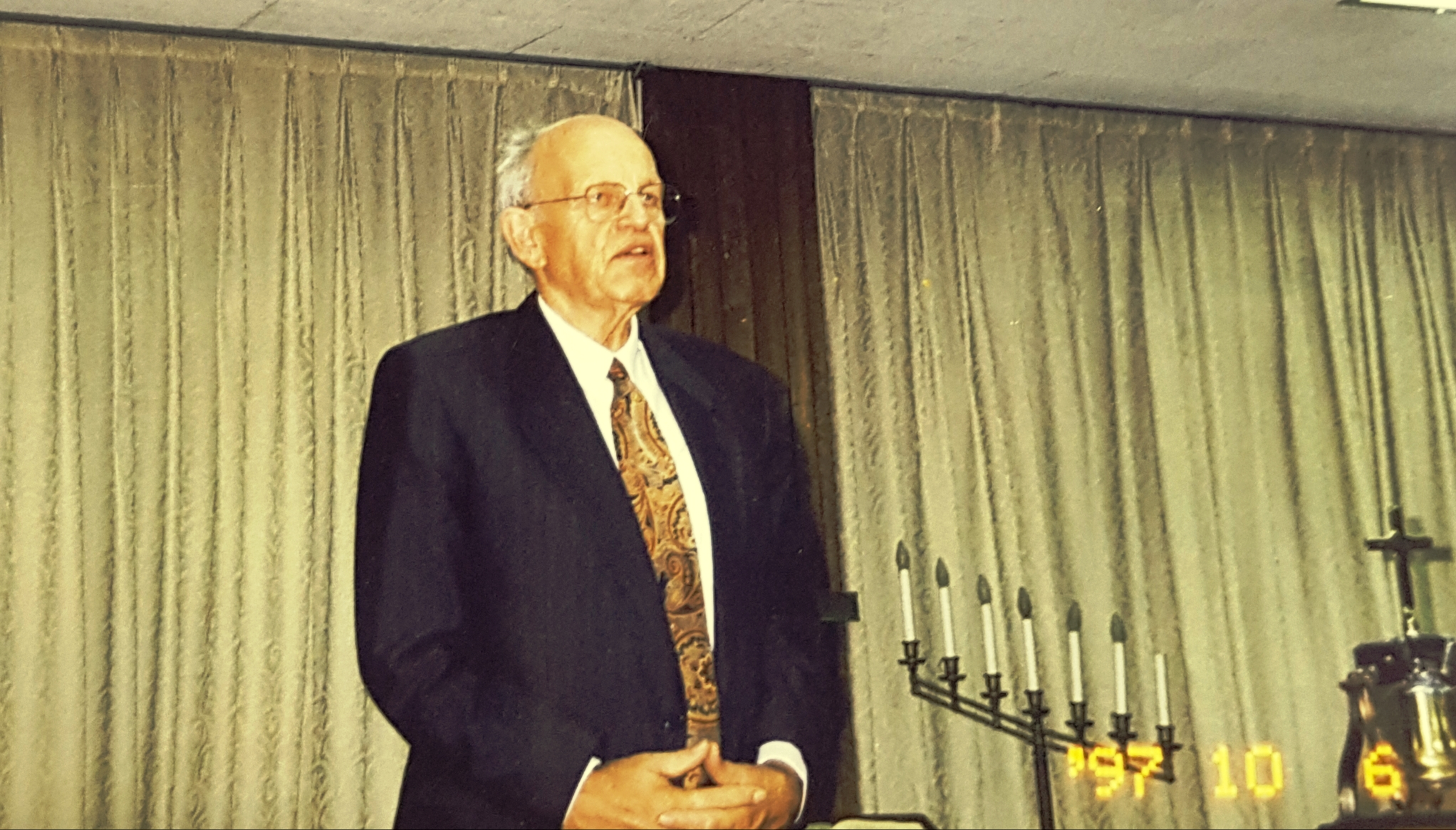
Dr. Wilhelm Heinrich Neuser, 6 October 1997, Asia United Theological University

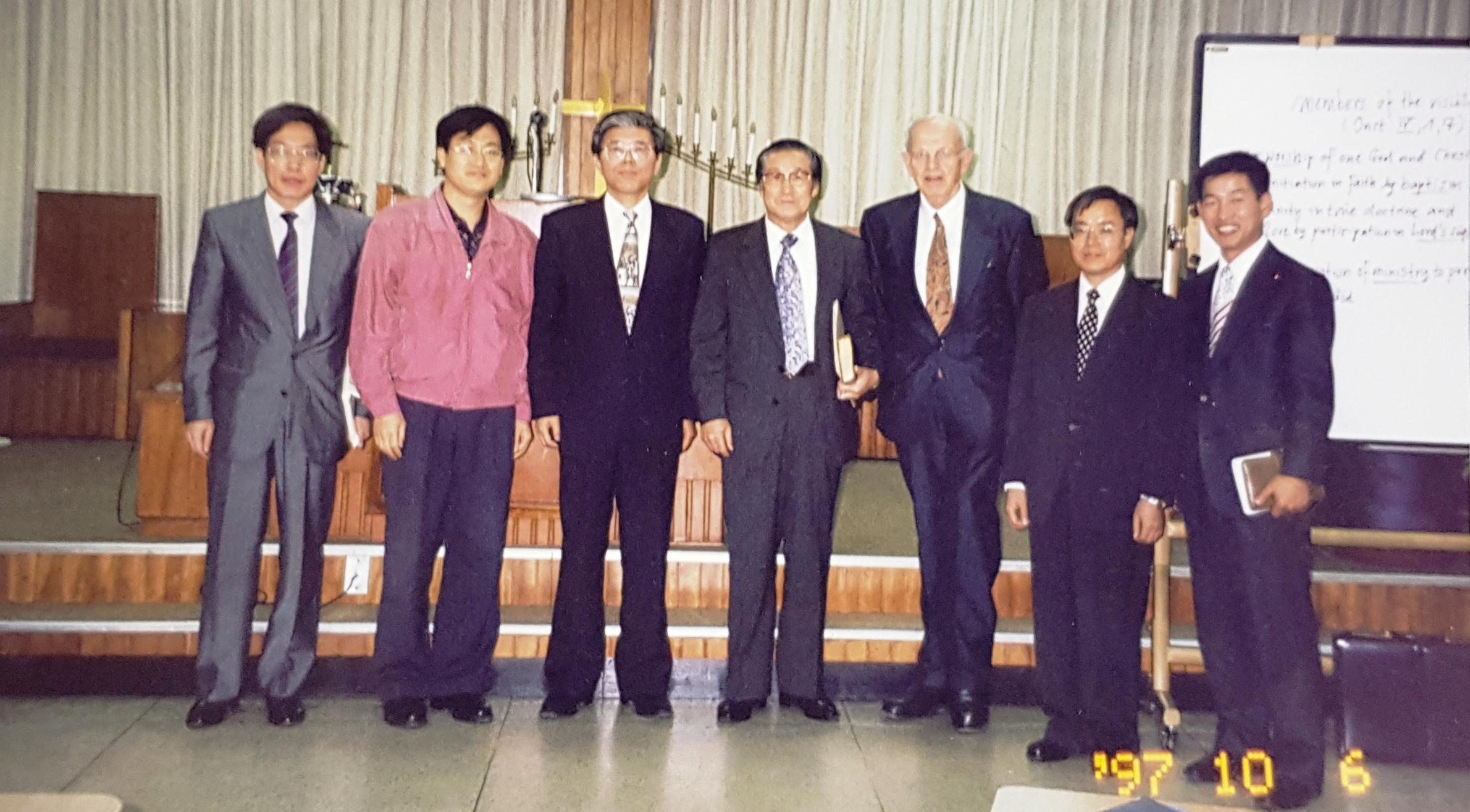
From the left Yonbai Choi, Keuntak Park, Myungjun Ahn, Chulha Han, Yangho Lee, and Seongbong Kim in Seoul, Korea

== Biography ==
Neuser, a son of the Evangelical Reformed pastor and later Superintendent Wilhelm Neuser, studied after graduating from the Protestant Theology at the Georg August University of Göttingen, University of Basel and at the Church College Bethel. In 1951 he passed his first ecclesiastical examination and then joined the Vicariate. After completing the vicariate, he received his doctorate in Doctor of Theology with a dissertation on Philipp Melanchthon.

In 1960 he received his habilitation at the Protestant Theological Faculty of the Westfälische Wilhelms-Universität Münster. In the following years he was first lecturer and adjunct professor before he was appointed professor at the Protestant Theological Faculty. In addition, in 1983 he was appointed director of the Institute for Westphalian Church History. This function he held even after his retirement in 1991 until 2002. In addition, he was dean of the Protestant Theological Faculty of the University of Westphalia between 1986 and 1987.

Neuser was a connoisseur of Calvinism and the person of John Calvin, as well as the history of theology and the church, working in research and teaching, focusing in particular on the territorial church history of Prussia and Westphalia. In addition to his scientific work, he was First Deputy Chairman of the Association for Westphalian Church History and for many years a member of the Working Group for Church History Research of the Evangelical Church of the Union (EKU). He was also a secretary and member of the presidency of the Calvin Research Congress for several years.

== Honors ==
In 1996, on the occasion of his 70th birthday, a commemorative publication by Jürgen Kampmann was titled Aus dem Land der Synoden. Festschrift for W.H. Neuser issued to the 70th Birthday.

For his services in 1998 he was awarded the honorary doctorate of a Doctor of Divinity (D.D.) from the Asia United Theological University in Seoul. In addition, in 2005 he received an honorary doctorate from the University of the Free State in Bloemfontein.

== See also ==
- John Calvin

== Publications ==
- Der Ansatz der Theologie Philipp Melanchthons. Verlag der Buchhandlung des Erziehungsvereins, Neukirchen 1957.
- Die reformatorische Wende bei Zwingli. Neukirchener Verlag, Neukirchen-Vluyn 1967, ISBN 978-3-7887-0484-1.
- Calvin (Sammlung Göschen; Bd. 3005). de Gruyter, Berlin 1971.
- Evangelische Kirchengeschichte Westfalens im Grundriß. Luther, Bielefeld 2002
- Johann Calvin. Leben und Werk in seiner Frühzeit 1509–1541. Vandenhoeck & Ruprecht, Göttingen 2009, ISBN 978-3-525-56915-3
