= Philibert Berthelier (Son of Geneva patriot) =

Philibert Berthelier was a Republic of Geneva citizen who opposed the ecclesiastical rule of John Calvin.

== Children of Geneva ==
Philibert Berthelier was a son of a Geneva patriot who had led Geneva in keeping its independence from Charles III, Duke of Savoy. As a member of a well-known family and part of the clan of Ami Perrin, a syndic or civil magistrate of Geneva, he and his brother François-Daniel became part of a group that opposed the ecclesiastical rule of John Calvin. The group called themselves, les enfants de Genève (children of Geneva), signifying the patriotic origins of the group.

In February 1552 this group (called the libertines by John Calvin) came to power through the election of Ami Perrin as first syndic. Berthelier became an auditor or an assistant judge. He and two other members of the group tried to cause trouble by insulting a minister Raymond Chauvet as he walked to St. Pierre Cathedral. The three were arrested and excommunicated. The city council under Perrin's control absolved them, but the ecclesiastical court, the Genevan Consistory, opposed the council's decision that they were free to communicate. The three were told by the Consistory to show signs of repentance.

Calvin was determined to assert the authority of the Consistory in ecclesiastical matters. Fearing a potential disturbance, someone warned Berthelier not to appear at church to take communion on 3 September 1553. On that day, Calvin preached a sermon in which he stated that he would not yield to the council's decision. Surprisingly, the council then reversed itself and a majority voted that excommunication was in the jurisdiction of the Consistory.

On 3 November, Berthelier applied to another Genevan assembly, the Deux Cents, for permission to take communion. The assembly decided that the authorised body to take that decision lay in the council. However, Berthelier was still refused communion by the ministers throughout the spring and summer of 1554. When he applied again for permission in November, the council decided that the Consistory had the final say in the matter.

Following the election of February 1555, the followers of Perrin were ousted. Perrin tried to stir trouble by attempting to set fire to another man's house. Suspected of subversion, Perrin and Berthelier were forced to flee Geneva. They were tried and condemned to death in absentia.
