= Philibert Berthelier (Geneva patriot) =

Swiss patriot

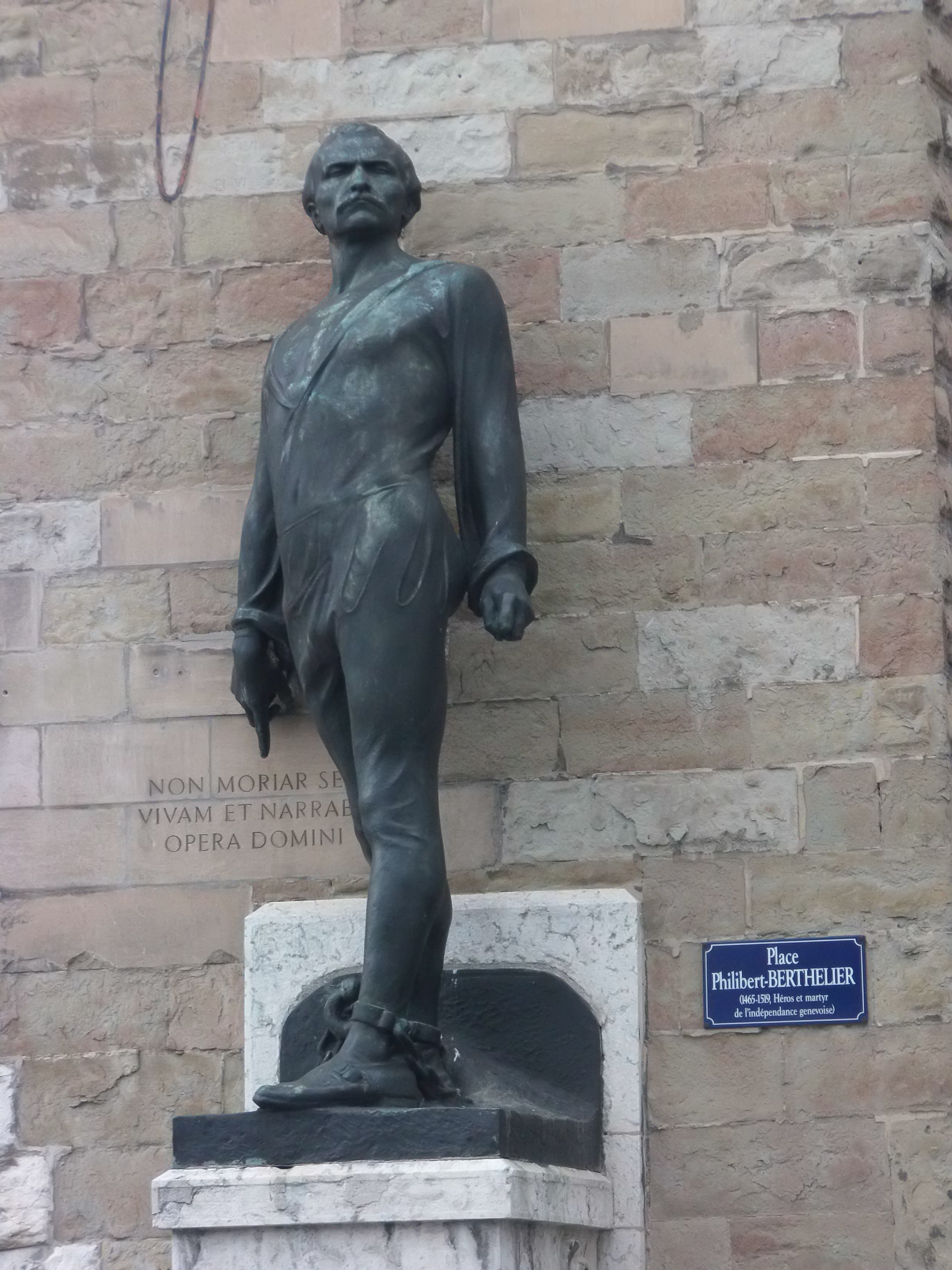
Statue of Philibert Berthelier in Geneva

Philibert Berthelier (c. 1465 – August 23, 1519), often known just as Berthelier, was a Genevan patriot, an uncompromising enemy of the Duke of Savoy in his ambition to control Geneva.

== Rebellion against the Duke of Savoy ==
In 1513, the Duke of Savoy nominated his cousin Jean de Savoie as Bishop of Geneva, and Berthelier called for a rebellion, but later made a political compromise with the Bishop of Geneva when accepting nomination as commander of the Castle of Penay. However, in June 1515, he rose in open rebellion, and in 1517 even fled to Fribourg in order to secretly promote a cooperation between the republican factions in both cities. In February 1518 he returned to Geneva after being given safe conduct by de Savoie, and in October of the same year began a series of secret meetings with members of the republican faction in the city (known as Huguenots) for the purpose of overthrowing Savoyard rule. In order to prevent any rebellion, de Savoie on 20 April 1519 moved his residence from Pignerol into Geneva. Berthelier was offered by his friends to flee to Fribourg another time, but refused.

== Trial and execution ==
Berthelier was arrested by the bishop's soldiers on August 23, 1519, and was tried for treason against the Duke of Savoy. For the purpose of the trial, the bishop circumvented the law that required trial by the Grand Council established in 1457 and appointed a former dentist named Jean Desbois as a special judge. After a summary trial held on the same day as the arrest, Berthelier was found guilty and was sentenced to death by beheading with the sentence carried out also the same day.

== Legacy ==
In the grounds of the church that stands beside the Domaine de Chateauvieux in the village of Peney, overlooking the Rhone near Geneva, there is a small plaque erected in 1986 to commemorate the 450th anniversary of the Reformation. This refers to the Castle of Peney as the 'ancient fief of Philibert Berthelier'. After the Reformation was declared Peney Castle was a stronghold of Catholicism and was destroyed by the Genevans in 1536. On the site now stands the Domaine de Chateauvieux, a luxury hotel and restaurant which has a brief historical account of the castle in English.

Berthelier had a son by the same name, who was an opponent of Jean Calvin. As a prominent Libertine Philibert Berthelier was secretary to the Council of Two Hundred, and, known for his sexual promiscuity, was excommunicated by the consistory of the Church of Geneva in 1551.
