= Philippe Rebille Philbert =

French flautist

'Philibert Rebillé dit Philbert (also Philibert, 1639 – after March 1717) was a French flautist.

He is credited with the introduction of the one-keyed flute to France in around 1667. He was made a court musician by Louis XIV under the title of Musette de Poitou.

His wife Catherine Philbert was involved in the Affair of the Poisons and was executed in 1679 for having poisoned her first husband, M. Brunet, in order to marry Philbert.
