= Madeleine d'Angennes, Marechale de la Ferté =

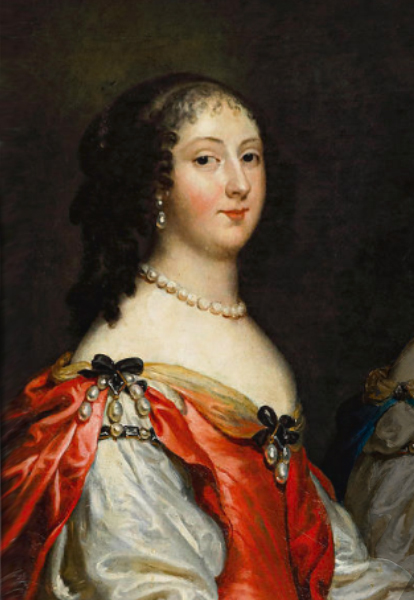
Madeleine d'Angennes, duchess of La Ferté-Senneterre - Château de Bussy-Rabutin (cropped)

Madeleine d’Angennes, Marechale de la Ferté (1629 – 1714), was a French noblewoman. She figured in the Affair of the Poisons (1679–1682), but was in fact never formally charged for a crime. She is foremost known in history as a legendary beautify of the era and for her many alleged love affairs, and she has been portrayed in many books in this capacity.

== Life ==
Madeleine d’Angennes was born to nobleman Charles Claude d'Angennes and Marie du Regnier, and the sister of Catherine-Henriette d’Angennes, comtesse d'Olonnes (1634–1714). She married Henri de Senneterre, Duke and Maréchal de la Ferté (1599–1681), on 25 April 1655.

Due to her marriage, she often attended the royal court, and was a celebrated figure in high society life. She and her sister both became known for their love affairs, and it was said that her husband tolerated them on the official pretext that he was unaware of them.

Among her lovers was Charles Paris d'Orléans, Duke of Longueville (1649–1672), with whom she had a son, Charles-Louis d'Orléans (1670–1688). Their son was legitimised by the Paris Parliament in 1672 without naming the mother, since the husband of a married woman automatically had the right to the children his wife gave birth to; this became a precedence used by King Louise XIV himself when he legitimised his children with his own married mistress Madame de Montespan the following year.

=== Poison Affair ===
The Poison Affair was launched in 1679. Initially, members of the nobility was kept outside of the investigation. On 23 January 1680, members of the nobility was involved in the Poison Affair investigation for the first time when orders for arrest were issued against Olympia Mancini, Countess of Soissons, François-Henri de Montmorency, duc de Luxembourg, Louis de Guilhem de Castelnau, marquis de Cessac and Jacqueline du Roure, vicomtesse de Polignac, while Marie Anne Mancini, Duchess of Bouillon, Claude Marie d'Artigny, comtesse du Roure, Benigne de Meaux de Fouilloux, Marquise d'Alluye, Antoine de Pas de Feuquières and Marie Charlotte Louise d'Albert, Princesse de Tingry were summoned for interrogation by the Police at the Arsenal.

La Voisin testified that the Countess of Soissons, had visited her in 1666 in the company of the Marquise d'Alluye and the Marechale de la Ferté, and at that occasion the Countess of Soissons had attempted to hire La Voisin to destroy Louise de La Valliere to replace her as mistress of the king.

There were a lot of contemporary rumours that the Marechale de la Ferté was accused for a number of serous crimes by the Chambre Ardante in connection to the Poison Affair, and she was also rumoured to have used La Voisin's services as an abortion provider. In reality, however, de la Ferté was not accused by any crimes, and was in fact not even formally called by the tribunal. She was questioned by the court because she, for unknown reasons, had reported herself to the Chambre Ardente and offered to answer any questions they could have. She was accompanied to court by several members of high society who were convinced that she was being persecuted by the police, as well as by her own husband, who defended her by claiming that she had merely visited the fortune tellers to get lucky at cards. The police asked her a few questions of little importance and let her go and deklared her innocent of any crime, an event which was celebrated by high society as well as by herself, who was described as being "delighted to be deklared innocent for the first time in her life".

=== Later life ===
Madeleine d'Angennes was completely legally unaffected by the Poison Affair, and was able to return to her normal high society life as before. She was widowed in 1681. According to tradition, she and her sister, as two legendary beauties famed for their love affairs, became increasingly concerned that they would be punished for their sins as they aged. According to a famous anecdote, she and her sister, as old women, were threatened by a priest that they would go to hell for their sins unless they showed their repentance through fasting. Madeleine d'Angennes was then to have said to her sister: "Sister, this is serious; it is no laughing matter; if we do not do our penance, we shall be damned. Sister, what must we do?' There was a long pause. 'My dear,' replied Mme d'Olonne, 'this is what we must do. We must let the servants fast'

== Legacy ==
Madeleine d'Angennes, Marechale de la Ferté has been portrayed in many literary works because of her love life. She was portrayed in the books La France Galante, Gallantry Unmask’d, The History Of The Mareschalless De La Ferté, and the La Galerie des Grandes Courtisanes by Émile Magne. She was a character in the novel The Ivory Mischief by Arthur Meeker Jr..
