= Trois Burettes =

Coordinates: 50.53559054°N 4.55217022°E

The Trois Burettes Inn was situated at the crossroads of Namur high road and the Old Roman Road, in Belgium. It was a notable location in two battles:

- Battle of Fleurus (1690): Duc de Luxembourg, commanding Louis XIV of a French army soundly defeated Prince Waldeck’s Allied force, composed mainly of Dutch, German, and Spanish troops. In this battle, the right wing of the French army crossed two bridges near the Trois-Burettes.
- Battle of Ligny (1815): The French Army of the North under Emperor Napoleon I defeated a Prussian army under the command of Prince Blücher. At the start of the battle, the cross roads were occupied by the Prussian 5th Brigade (General Tippelskirch's). When the 5th Brigade advanced on Saint-Amand-la-Haye, the 7th Brigade (General Brause's) occupied the position.
