= Claude Marie d'Artigny, comtesse du Roure =

French noblewoman

Claude Marie d'Artigny, comtesse du Roure (1645 – 1720), was a French noblewoman. She is known as a defendant of the Affair of the Poisons (1679–1682).

== Life ==
Claude Marie d'Artigny served as a maid-of-honour to Henrietta of England, sister-in-law to king Louis XIV, prior to her marriage. She was a personal friend of her colleague Louise de La Valliere, and acted as a go-between during the relationship between the king and Louise de La Vallière. In 1666, she was dismissed by Henrietta after having given birth in secret. The king gave her a large dowry which made it possible for her to marry the comte du Roure, Lieutenant General of Languedoc. Due to her marriage she was able to continue to attend court without having a position of her own there, and continued her frendship of Louise de La Vallière.

=== Poison Affair ===
The Poison Affair was launched in 1679. Initially, members of the nobility was kept outside of the investigation. On 23 January 1680, members of the nobility was involved in the Poison Affair investigation for the first time when orders for arrest were issued against Olympia Mancini, Countess of Soissons, François-Henri de Montmorency, duc de Luxembourg, Louis de Guilhem de Castelnau, marquis de Cessac and Jacqueline du Roure, vicomtesse de Polignac, while Marie Anne Mancini, Duchess of Bouillon, Claude Marie d'Artigny, comtesse du Roure, Benigne de Meaux de Fouilloux, Marquise d'Alluye, Antoine de Pas de Feuquières and Marie Charlotte Louise d'Albert, Princesse de Tingry were summoned for interrogation by the Police at the Arsenal.

La Voisin alleged that du Roure, who had been her client since 1666 but had left her to become the client of Adam Lesage, lived in an unhappy relationship with her husband but in a happy one with her brother-in-law; that she had wished for the death of Louise de La Valliere in order to be the king's mistress herself. Lesage denied ever having had her as a client, and La Voisin took back her allegations and claimed that she had only discussed the death of La Valliere with du Roure in passing.

She was questioned by the Chambre Ardante in February 1680. She denied ever having had anything to do with La Voisin or anyone like her. The case against her was weak: the testimony of La Voisin was contradictive and appear to have been at least partially confused her with her sister-in-law Jacqueline du Roure, vicomtesse de Polignac, who had also allegedly expressed a wish to kill La Valliere to become the king's mistress. During the confrontation between La Voisin and du Roure, La Voisin was unable to recognise and identify her.

=== Later life ===
She was officially acquitted from all charges on 26 April 1680. Despite this, she was still exiled by the king from the royal court and the capital of Paris. She settled on the countryside in Languedoc where her husband was governor, where she lived in one castle and her husband in another.
