= Battle of Valenciennes =

Battle of Valenciennes may refer to:

- Battle of Valenciennes (1656), fought on 16 July that year during the Franco-Spanish War, resulting in a Spanish victory.
- Battle of Famars or Valenciennes (1793), fought on 23 May, was a First Coalition victory on the borders of France which prepared the way for a siege of Valenciennes
- Battle of Valenciennes (1918), fought between British, Canadian and German forces on 1 and 2 November resulting in an Allied victory
