= Jacqueline du Roure, vicomtesse de Polignac =

Jacqueline du Roure, vicomtesse de Polignac (1641 – 1720), was a French noblewoman. She is known as a defendant during the Affair of the Poisons (1679–1682).

== Life ==
Jacqueline du Roure was born to François Scipion de Grimoard de Beauvoir du Roure and Grésinde de Baudan. In 1658 she married Louis-Armand III de Polignac, vicomte de Polignac (1608–1692).

The Poison Affair was launched in 1679. Initially, members of the nobility was kept outside of the investigation. On 23 January 1680, members of the nobility was involved in the Poison Affair investigation for the first time when orders for arrest were issued against Olympia Mancini, Countess of Soissons, François-Henri de Montmorency, duc de Luxembourg, Louis de Guilhem de Castelnau, marquis de Cessac and Jacqueline du Roure, vicomtesse de Polignac, while Marie Anne Mancini, Duchess of Bouillon, Claude Marie d'Artigny, comtesse du Roure, Benigne de Meaux de Fouilloux, Marquise d'Alluye, Antoine de Pas de Feuquières and Marie Charlotte Louise d'Albert, Princesse de Tingry were summoned for interrogation by the Police at the Arsenal.

Adam Lesage alleged that she had hired him to perform magic in order to keep her three lovers Comte du Lude, Vicomte de Larbouse and M. Doradour; he further alleged that when she had been informed that Claude Marie d'Artigny, comtesse du Roure, had hired La Voisin to make king Louis XV fall in love with her, she had herself commissioned Lesage to kill her husband, poison the king's mistress Louise de La Valliere, and then make the king fall in love with her.

She fled France in January 1680 to avoid being arrested and put on trial. On 18 July 1680, she was declared defiant by the court in her absence. Her husband was questioned and testified that he had been aware of her attempts to make the king fall in love with her by the use of black magic, and admitted that he had done nothing to prevent her.

She returned to France from her exile six years later in 1686. Louis XIV chose not to submit her to any further consequences, but did exile her from the court and the capital.
