= Marie Charlotte Louise d'Albert, Princesse de Tingry =

Marie Charlotte Louise Claire d'Albert, Princesse de Tingry (1623 – 1706), was a French lady-in-waiting. She is known as a defendant of the Affair of the Poisons (1679-1682).

== Life ==
Marie Charlotte was born to Charles-Henri II de Clermont-Tonnerre and Marguerite-Charlotte de Luxembourg-Piney. She was the sister of Madeleine de Clermont-Tonnerre, duchesse de Luxembourg-Piney, princesse de Tingry, comtesse de Ligny, baronne de Dangu. In 1661, her sister married François-Henri de Montmorency, duc de Luxembourg.

Marie Charlotte never married but was placed in a convent by her family, and forced to become a nun against her will. When her brother-in-law was informed that his sister-in-law was a nun against her will, he arranged for her to leave the convent in exchange for her promise not to interfere in his marriage.

He promised to acquire a position for her at court, and she served as Dame du Palais for the queen of France, Marie Therese of Spain, between 1679 and 1683. The post of Dame du Palais was reserved for married women, but since she was technically still a nun, she had the status of a married woman and was referred to as 'Madame' as well as her title by birth, Princesse de Tingry. Her sister and brother-in-law were known to live separate lives, and it was a public secret in high society that Marie Charlotte and her brother-in-law were lovers.

=== Poison Affair ===
The Poison Affair was launched in 1679. Initially, members of the nobility was kept outside of the investigation. On 23 January 1680, members of the nobility was involved in the Poison Affair investigation for the first time when orders for arrest were issued against Olympia Mancini, Countess of Soissons, François-Henri de Montmorency, duc de Luxembourg, Louis de Guilhem de Castelnau, marquis de Cessac and Jacqueline du Roure, vicomtesse de Polignac, while Marie Anne Mancini, Duchess of Bouillon, Claude Marie d'Artigny, comtesse du Roure, Benigne de Meaux de Fouilloux, Marquise d'Alluye, Antoine de Pas de Feuquières and Marie Charlotte Louise d'Albert, Princesse de Tingry were summoned for interrogation by the Police at the Arsenal.

Adam Lesage testified that the Princesse de Tingry was a client of Francoise Filastre; he also alleged that she had hired him to make a pact with Satan for a purpose that had "something to do with the king". She was implicated to have been an accomplice in the crimes of her brother-in-law.

Witnesses further claimed that she had become pregnant with her brother-in-law three times, that she had three abortions performed by La Voisin, who was claimed to have burnt the aborted fetuses in the furnace in her reception room; alternatively, they had been dried or became ingredients of magical potions.

The Princesse de Tingry was interrogated at the Arsenal on 29 January. While she did not make any confessions, her uncertain behaviour during the interrogation and the fact that she left it in tears attracted attention and made her a target of gossip.

Madame de Sevigne commented that the Princesse de Tingry and the Duchess de Bouillon might have acted foolishly, but that no one believed in their crimes, and that Le Reynie should have avoided involving people of such high rank, since the prisoners in Vincennes likely only accused them in order to lengthen their own lives with false allegations.

Adam Lesage alleged that her brother-in-law had attempted to poison a governor as well as his wife, and for having bought magical services in order to arrange a marriage between his son and the daughter of Louvois as well as for making his sister-in-law the Princesse de Tingry to fall in love with him; he denied the accusations, and commented that while he was proud to have the "friendship" of his sister-in-law, he had no reason to wish the death of his wife.

=== Later life ===
The Princesse de Tingry was formally acquitted the day after her brother-in-law, but like him she still retired from court for exile to the countryside because of the public scandal. In June 1681, her brother-in-law was rehabilitated by being officially recalled to court, and in November that year, Tingry was herself recalled to resume her service as lady-in-waiting.
