= Benigne de Meaux de Fouilloux, Marquise d'Alluye =

Benigne de Meaux de Fouilloux, Marquise d'Alluye (1648–1720), was a French courtier. She is known for her involvement in the Affair of the Poisons (1677-1682).

== Life ==
Benigne de Meaux de Fouilloux was born to Charles de Meaux and Madeleine de Lézignac. She served as a maid-of-honor at the royal court between 1662 and 1667. In 1667 she married Paul d'Escoubleau, Marquis d'Alluye, governor of Orleans.

The Poison Affair was launched in 1679. Initially, members of the nobility was kept outside of the investigation. On 23 January 1680, members of the nobility was involved in the Poison Affair investigation for the first time when orders for arrest were issued against Olympia Mancini, Countess of Soissons, François-Henri de Montmorency, duc de Luxembourg, Louis de Guilhem de Castelnau, marquis de Cessac and Jacqueline du Roure, vicomtesse de Polignac, while Marie Anne Mancini, Duchess of Bouillon, Claude Marie d'Artigny, comtesse du Roure, Benigne de Meaux de Fouilloux, Marquise d'Alluye, Antoine de Pas de Feuquières and Marie Charlotte Louise d'Albert, Princesse de Tingry were summoned for interrogation by the Police at the Arsenal.

La Voisin stated that d'Alluye had accompanied Olympia Mancini, Countess of Soissons, when de Soissons had consulted La Voisin, who wished to replace Louise de La Vallière as the king's favorite. According to La Voisin, d'Alluye had been engaged in the plot and had herself asked her if the wish of de Soissons would be fullfilled. d'Alluye was called to interrogation while an order of arrest had been issued for de Soissons. d'Alluye chose to accompany de Soissons on her escape to Namur. It was assumed that there were a more serious crime behind the summon, and it was therefore rumoured that d'Alluye had been accused of poisoning her father-in-law.

Her husband protested and claimed that the court had no right to summon his wife, since she was a member of the nobility, but the king responded by banishing him to the countryside. Eventually however d'Alluye was allowed by the king to return to France without any further legal proceedings, as was her husband, though neither of them were allowed to attend the royal court.

Saint-Simon mentioned her in his memoirs.
