= Louis de Guilhem de Castelnau, marquis de Cessac =

Louis de Guilhem de Castelnau, marquis de Cessac (floruit 1692), was a French courtier and soldier. He is known for his involvement in the Affair of the Poisons (1677–1682).

== Life ==
Louis de Guilhem de Castelnau, marquis de Cessac, served in the French army. He also had an office at the royal court as the Master of the wardrobe to king Louis XIV. In March 1671, the King had him exiled for cheating in cards at the royal table. He was allowed to return in 1674.

The Poison Affair was launched in 1679. Initially, members of the nobility was kept outside of the investigation. On 23 January 1680, members of the nobility was involved in the Poison Affair investigation for the first time when orders for arrest were issued against Olympia Mancini, Countess of Soissons, François-Henri de Montmorency, duc de Luxembourg, Louis de Guilhem de Castelnau, marquis de Cessac and Jacqueline du Roure, vicomtesse de Polignac, while Marie Anne Mancini, Duchess of Bouillon, Claude Marie d'Artigny, comtesse du Roure, Benigne de Meaux de Fouilloux, Marquise d'Alluye, Antoine de Pas de Feuquières and Marie Charlotte Louise d'Albert, Princesse de Tingry were summoned for interrogation by the Police at the Arsenal.

Adam Lesage stated that the marquis de Cessac had expressed a wish to murder his brother in order to marry his sister-in-law. Lesage claimed that before his banishment in 1671, de Cessac had asked him for magical services in order to cheat at cards, especially when he played with the king, and that he had expressed a wish to kill his brother so that he could marry his brothers wife. On his commission, Lesage had performed a magical ritual with a bone from a church yard which had sewn in to a shirt; de Cessac had promised to pay him when he was informed about his brothers death, but since he never did, Lesage never received more money.

de Cessac left the country to avoid arrest. He lived for several years in England, where Charles II of England was amused by the warning that the de Cessac had hired a wizard to cheat in cards.

He was allowed to return to France, to the army, as well as the royal court in April 1691, and was formally acquitted from the charges in the Bastille in July 1692.
