= Battle of Valenciennes (1656) =

1656 battle during the Franco-Spanish War

Coordinates: 50.3581°N 3.5233°E

- Part of the Franco-Spanish War
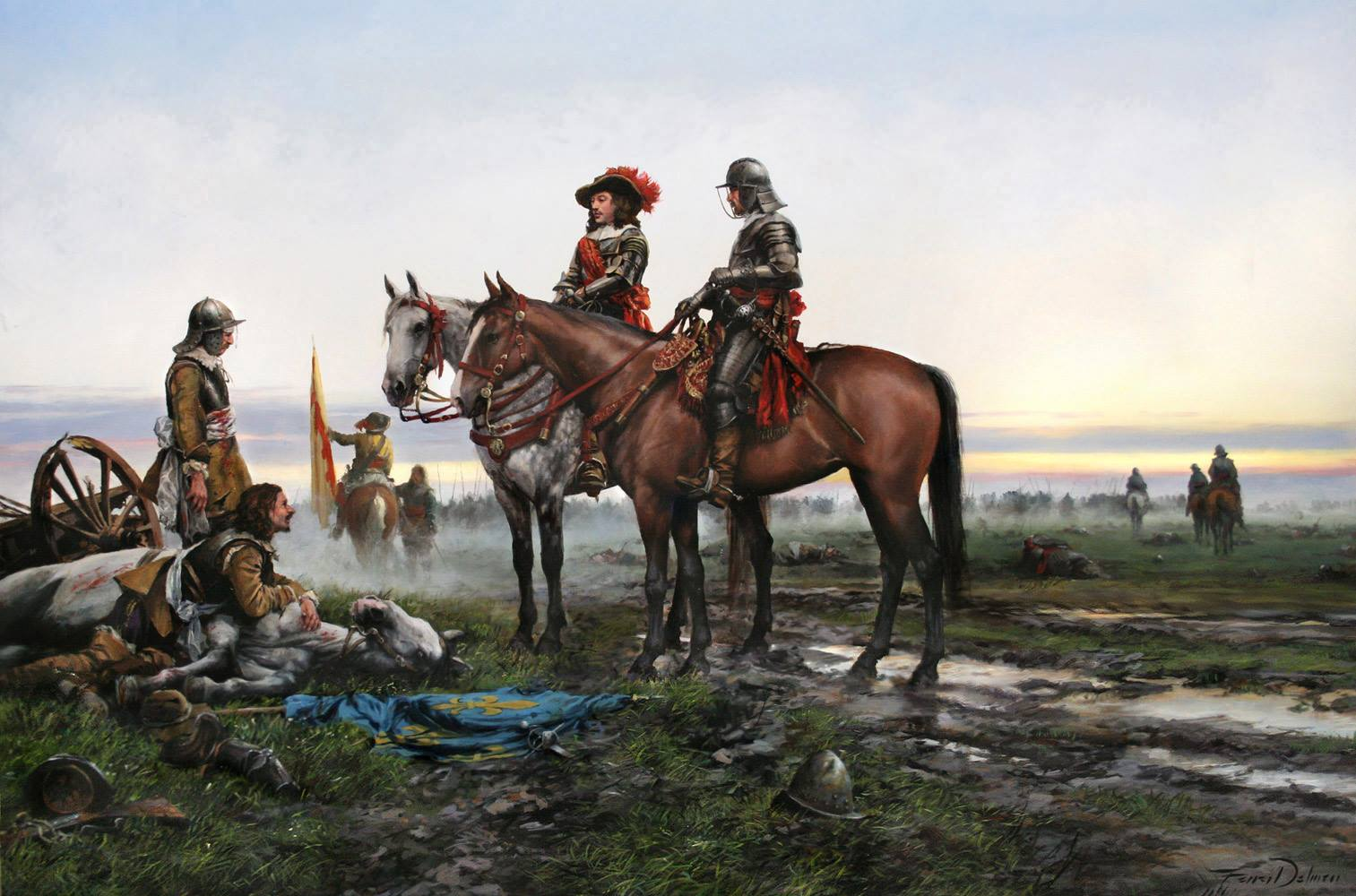
- Oil painting of the battle by Augusto Ferrer-Dalmau.
Date	16 July 1656
Location	Valenciennes, Spanish Netherlands
Result	Spanish victory

Belligerents
France	Spain

Commanders and leaders
(Kingdom of France) Turenne (Kingdom of France) La Ferté-Senneterre (POW)	(Spain) John of Austria (Spain) Grand Condé

Strength
24,000–30,000	22,000

Casualties and losses
6,000 (Note: Bodart states 2,000 killed or wounded and 4,000 captured.)–8,000 (Note: Picouet states up to 3,000 captured and the remaining 5,000 killed or wounded.) killed, wounded or captured	500–1,500 killed or wounded

The Battle of Valenciennes was fought on 16 July 1656 between the Spanish troops commanded by John Joseph of Austria and the French troops under Henri de la Tour d'Auvergne, Vicomte de Turenne, in the outskirts of the city of Valenciennes in the Spanish Netherlands during the Franco-Spanish War. After a period of Spanish recovery following the Peace of Münster in 1648, France went again on the offensive in 1654, having succeeded in suppressing internal rebellions, and took several towns in the province of Hainaut over the course of two years. On early 1656, Turenne was instructed by the French court to continue the offensive. He intended at first to besiege Tournai, but realising that it had been strongly reinforced by the Army of Flanders under the newly appointed John Joseph of Austria, illegitimate son of Philip IV of Spain, he went instead to besiege Valenciennes, in the course of the Scheldt River.

The defenders of the city opened locks and breached dikes to flood the surroundings and hamper the siege. Their strong resistance gave time the Spanish army to prepare a relief which took place one month after the beginning of the siege. The early hours of 16 July, the forces led by John Joseph of Austria and the Prince of Condé, the victor of the Battle of Rocroi, now in Spanish service, stormed the French circumvallation lines west of Valenciennes, defended by the forces of Field Marshal Henri de La Ferté-Senneterre. The Spanish were victorious and destroyed Le Ferté's army, whom Turenne was unable to help because of the floods that separated their respective armies.

The Battle of Valenciennes was the worst of only a few defeats that Turenne suffered in his long career campaigning, and is regarded as Spain's last great victory of the 17th century, as well as one of France's worst defeats of the century. Coupled with another Spanish victory over the French at Pavia in 1655, that of Valenciennes seriously damaged France's military capabilities and fueled the hopes in the Spanish court for a favourable peace with France after more than twenty years of conflict. Peace talks took place at Madrid during the summer of that year, but ultimately failed to produce any result, and the war continued for three more years, until the Peace of the Pyrenees in 1659.

== Background ==
France and Spain had been in war since 1635. The outbreak of revolts in Catalonia and Portugal in 1640 allowed the French to gain advantage in all the fronts, notably after the Battle of Rocroi in 1643. However, the Peace of Münster between Spain and the Dutch Republic in 1648, together with the beginning of a series of civil wars in France known as the Fronde, allowed Spain to recover most of the lost ground. By the end of 1652, the armies of Philip IV had recovered Barcelona and most of Catalonia, the strategic ports of Gravelines and Dunkirk in Flanders, and managed to capture the fortified city of Casale Monferrato in Italy. Spain offered peace to France, yet Cardinal Mazarin, chief minister to Louis XIV, rejected them, hoping that the kingdom would be able to recover. In 1653, the French Royal armies subdued the Fronde in Bordeaux and the southwestern France, while the poor relationship between the leader of the Fronde, the Prince of Condé, and the commanders of the Army of Flanders, archduke Leopold Wilhelm and Count Fuensaldaña, hampered the planned Spanish-Frondeur invasion of France.

In 1654, France continued to bolster its position by subduing the Fronde in Alsace and laying siege to the city of Stenay, in Lorraine, which was held by the Condéan army. In response, Leopold Wilhelm and Condé, together with the allied forces of duke Charles IV of Lorraine, laid siege to Arras, the capital of the County of Artois. Stenay surrendered on 6 August, while a French army under Turenne stormed the Spanish lines of circumvallation around Arras on 25 August and forced the Spanish army and its allies to abandon the siege in hurry. The French victory was not decisive, since the archduke was able to take the field again within a few weeks after making new recruits. The battle had, however, deep political consequences, since Condé, whose dexterity saved the allied army from destruction, was hailed as a hero by the Spanish court, and the support from Philip IV and his valido, Luis de Haro, gave him the status of 'informal authority' in competence with Leopold Wilhelm and Fuensaldaña.

The Spanish situation worsened further in 1655 as the French army under Turenne took Landrecies after an eighteen-days siege in 14 July, and the strategic towns of Condé and Saint-Ghislain, situated north of Valenciennes, on 18 and 25 August. After that, the French consolidated their control in the province of Hainaut by seizing and fortifying positions around Condé, Arleux and other localities. Important cities like Douai, Bouchain, Valenciennes and Tournai were put under threat. Just as the campaign finished, the Spanish prestige was seriously damaged when the Lorrainer forces, led by duke Francis, defected to France in November and allowed them to take control of a series of fortresses in Lorraine, the Electorate of Trier and the middle Rhine. The change of side was motivated by the arrest and imprisoning of duke Charles by Philip IV, who accused him of conspiring with Mazarin and who wished to turn Lorraine into a Spanish client state.

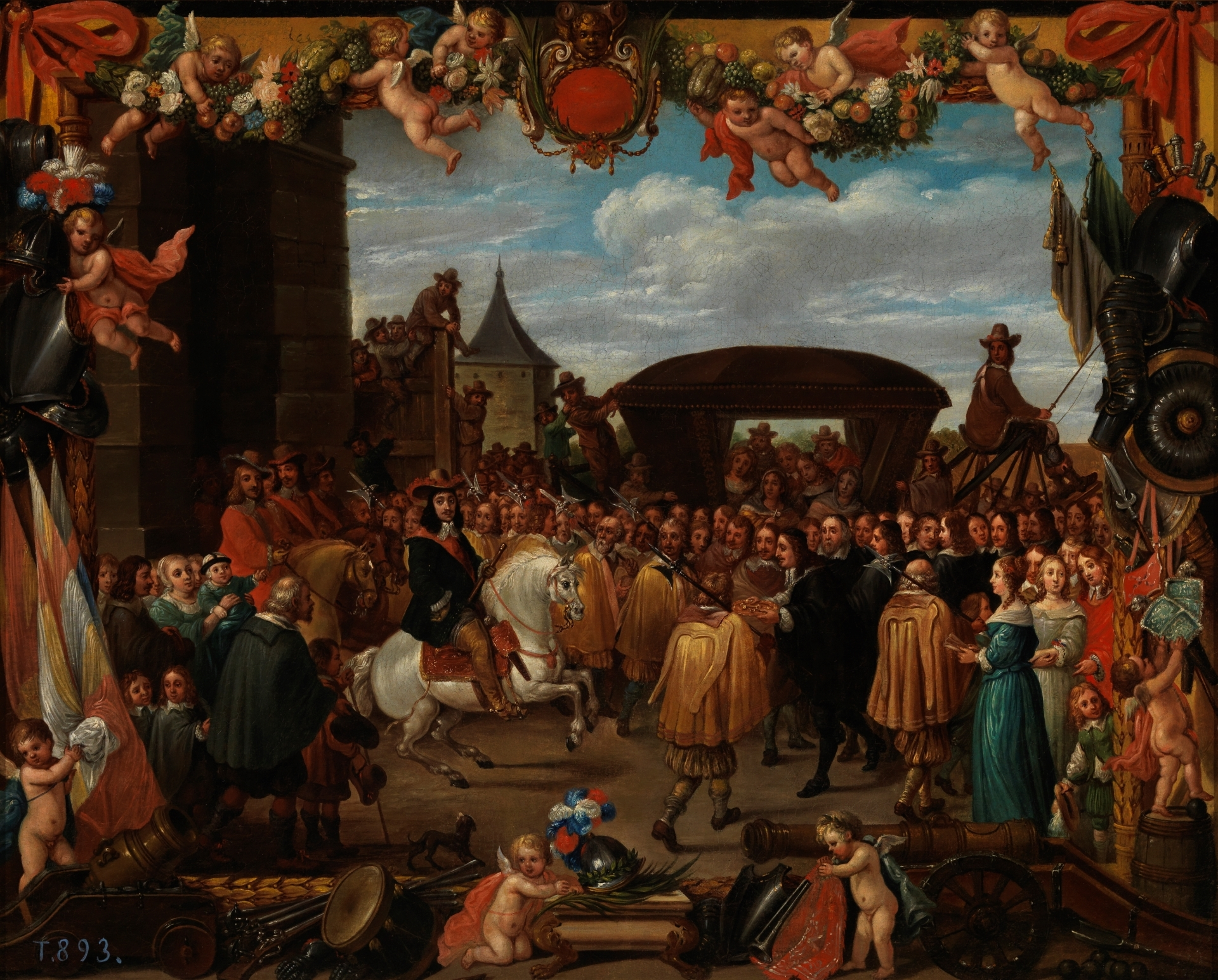
Triumphal entry of John Joseph of Austria into the Southern Netherlands, attributed to David Teniers III

The Spanish defeats led Philip IV to replace Leopold Wilhelm as governor of the Spanish Netherlands and commander of the Army of Flanders by John Joseph of Austria, his illegitimate son. Despite his young age, John was already an experienced and successful commander who had brought Naples and Catalonia back under Spanish rule, as well as a skilled negotiator. On 17 February 1656, the Spanish monarch ordered his son to secretly embark at Barcelona towards Genoa in order to travel to Brussels as fast as possible. Near Minorca, the small squadron of two galleys where he travelled was attacked by Barbary pirates. One of the galleys was captured, and John barely escaped. He landed at Genoa on 23 March and reached Milan the 29th. From there, he travelled to Trento and then to Innsbruck, from where he moved into Bavaria. Having crossed the Danube at Donauwörth, he took a boat at Miltenberg and sailed down the Main up to Frankfurt. There, he was joined by the Marquis of Caracena, who had been appointed Governor of the Arms (second in command) of the Army of Flanders after the Prince of Condé, through his agents at Madrid, managed to have Fuensaldaña sacked. They travelled by boat to Mayence and Coblenz, finally landing at Cologne on 1 May. There they received by Fuensaldaña with 400 Spanish and 400 Condéan cavalry soldiers, who escorted them to the Spanish Netherlands. John met Leopold Wilhelm on 10 May at the Basilica of Our Lady of Scherpenheuvel, and Condé near Leuven the next journey. The entrance at Brussels took place on 12 May.

In early 1656, the Army of Flanders had 22,000 soldiers available for field operations. On 2 April, a treaty of alliance was agreed at Brussels between representatives of Philip IV and Charles II of England in which the exiled British monarch agreed to raise troops to fight for Spain against France in exchange of support for him to be restored on his throne. In the meantime, however, the French enjoyed numerical superiority and took the initiative. Their forces were divided into two armies, one of 16,500 men led by Turenne, who acted as overall commander, and another one of 9,000 to 10,000 men under Field Marshal La Ferté. Having joined forces at Chauny on 1 May, they established their depots at Le Quesnoy and took the field on early June. The then 18 years old Louis XIV intended to participate in the campaign and left Paris on 27 May towards Compiègne. He arrived at La Fère on 7 June to follow the operations from there, and Mazarin soon joined him. Turenne aimed first at besieging Tournai and advanced towards there on 12 June. However, the Spanish command anticipated the move and reinforced the city with 4,000 men. The French commander decided then to besiege Valenciennes. On 15 June his army closed on from one side, while next day La Ferté approached from the other, being their troops separated by the Scheldt river.

== Siege ==
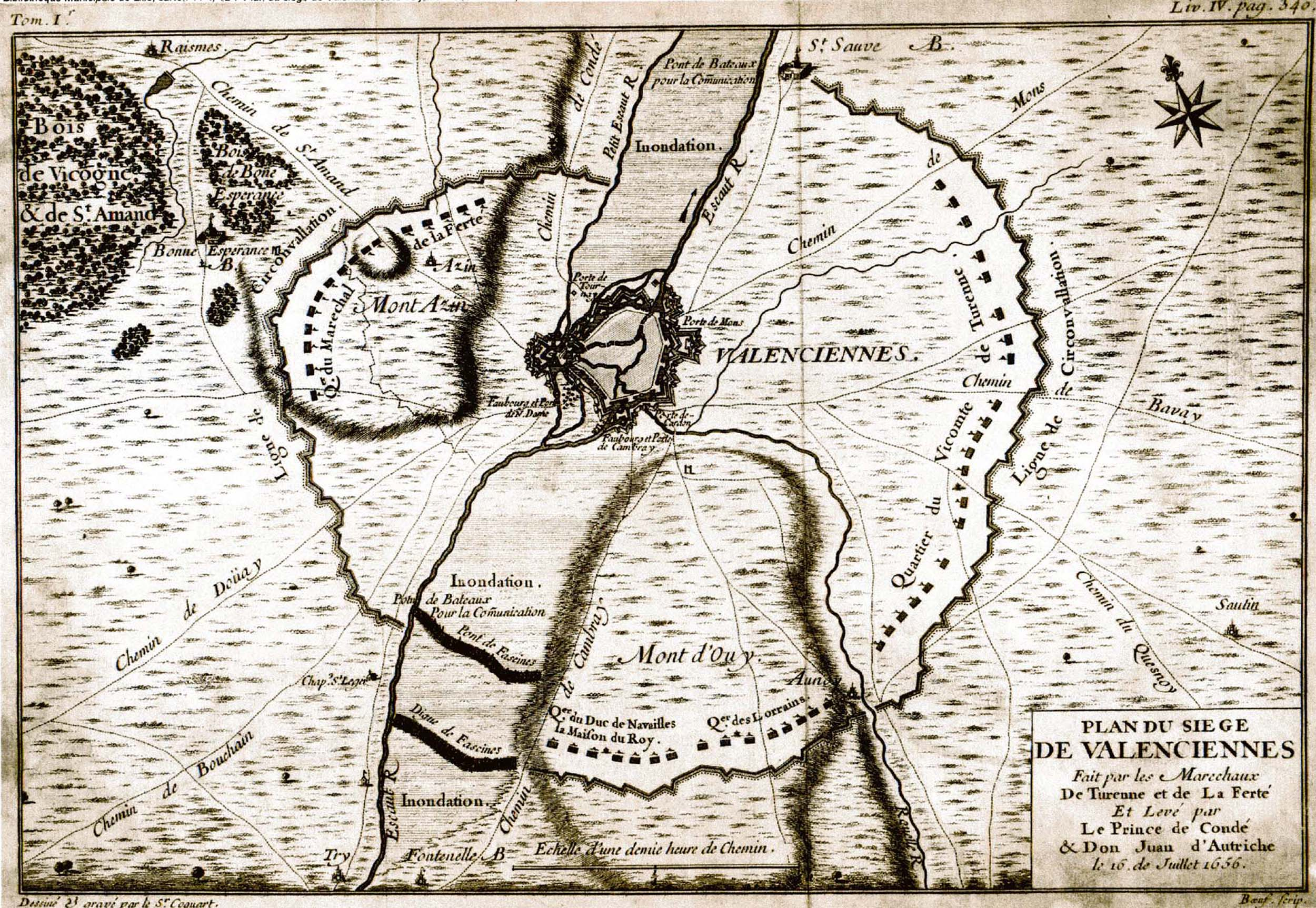
The Siege of Valenciennes.

=== Investment ===
The garrison of Valenciennes consisted of 2,000 infantry and 300 cavalry soldiers led by Alexander de Bournonville, Count of Henin, which were reinforced gradually by 6,000 armed burghers. The Spanish Tercio of Francisco de Meneses Brito was entrusted the guard of the gate of Anzin, on the citadel, which gave access to the river, while Bournonville's own German regiment was positioned to protect the gates of Lille and Le Quesnoy, the Walloon Tercio of the Count de La Motterie was detached to protect the gate of Mons, and the burghers took care of the gate of Famars, the Tourelle —a small palace belonging to the Society of Jesus on the right bank of the Scheldt— and the redoubt of St. Ignace. The Walloon Tercio of Maestre de Campo Verkeest, which was garrisoning the nearby town of Saint-Amand, tried to reinforce Valenciennes, but could not get across the French lines

The French army invested Valenciennes and started the construction of a circumvallation line. Turenne deployed his troops between the Abbey of Saint-Saulve and the road to Bouchain. He established his quarter with the bulk of the army in the road to Le Quesnoy, since any relief army would likely appear on that side. Southwest of Turenne's quarter, separated from it by a stream called Rhonelle, which flows into the Scheldt at Valenciennes, there were two further quarters garrisoned by the Lorrainer troops led by the Count of Ligneville and the Maison du Roi under Anne de Noailles. A pontoon bridge was built over the Scheldt to connect Turenne's with La Ferté's armies. West of the river, the latter extended his lines from Bourlain to l'Épaix. Four redoubts were built on this section to counter any attempt to relieve the city. However, La Ferté did a serious mistake: not extending the lines to cover the high ground which presided over the whole section.

In order to hamper the French siege works, Bournonville ordered the terrain around the city to be flooded. On 16 June, the defenders breached a dike near the Tourelle, which led to the marshes of Bourlain to be flooded. Next day, the canal of the Cambrai faubourg was obstructed, and, as a consequence, the surroundings of l'Épaix were flooded. The same day, the defenders of the citadel made a sortie in which 150 French soldiers were killed or wounded. On the 18th, the French took the tower of Raismes, a fortified post halfway between Valenciennes and Saint-Amand, and repelled an attempt by troops from the garrison of Bouchain to reinforce Valenciennes across the Lorrainer lines. In order to ease the communications between the two besieging armies, the French sappers started to build a bridge of fascines over the flooded terrain south of Valenciennes. In response, Bournonville ordered another dike to be breached, which increased the water level by three feet. This did not stopped the construction of the bridge, which was finished by 26 June and had a length of 2,000 paces.

=== Preparations for the relief ===
Once the circumvallation line was completed on 26 June, the besiegers started to dig trenches in two approaches directed to the citadel from the quarter of Marshal La Ferté. To support the attacks, the French erected two batteries in front of the port of Montoise; one was furnished by seven 34 or 35-pounder heavy cannons, and the other by seven. Over the following days, the Spanish defenders made several sorties that slowed the pace of the attacks and gave time forJohn Joseph of Austria and Condé to prepare the relief. They were then at Douai ahead a force of 10,500 to 10,000 infantry and 5,000 to 5,500 Spanish cavalry, plus 5,800 Condéans. On 27 June, they advanced to Valenciennes from the south and established a fortified camp at Mont Houy, a hill located between the villages of Famars and La Fontenelle with the Scheldt on the right and the Rhonelle on the left. A smaller detachment of 4,000 men under the Count of Marsin positioned itself on the opposite side of Scheldt at Saint-Amand-les-Eaux, north of the French lines.

While the Spanish forces skirmished along the French lines looking for a weak spot, a three-cannon battery was established at Mount Houy to bombard the quarters of Ligneville and Noailles. In turn, the French troops increased the pace of their trench works and, by the night of 1 to 2 July, they were in position to launch an assault over the ravelin of Montoise. That night, the Regiment of Piemont launched an attack on the covertway over the counterscarp, which was repelled by the defenders. The night of 5 to 6 July, a second assault took place, this time by the Regiment of La Ferté. Paillet, its commanding officer, was killed, and the unit lost a third of its strength. The next day, however, the Regiment of Piemont succeeded in the taking counterscarp. Bournonville then wrote a letter to John Joseph to inform him that he would not be able ro resist more than a few days. On 14 July, the prince assembled a war council in which it was decided to attack the French lines and relieve Valenciennes. Next day, the baggage was sent to Bouchain while the bulk of the Spanish Army crossed the Scheldt at Denain to attack the army of La Ferté.

== Order of battle ==
=== Spanish army ===
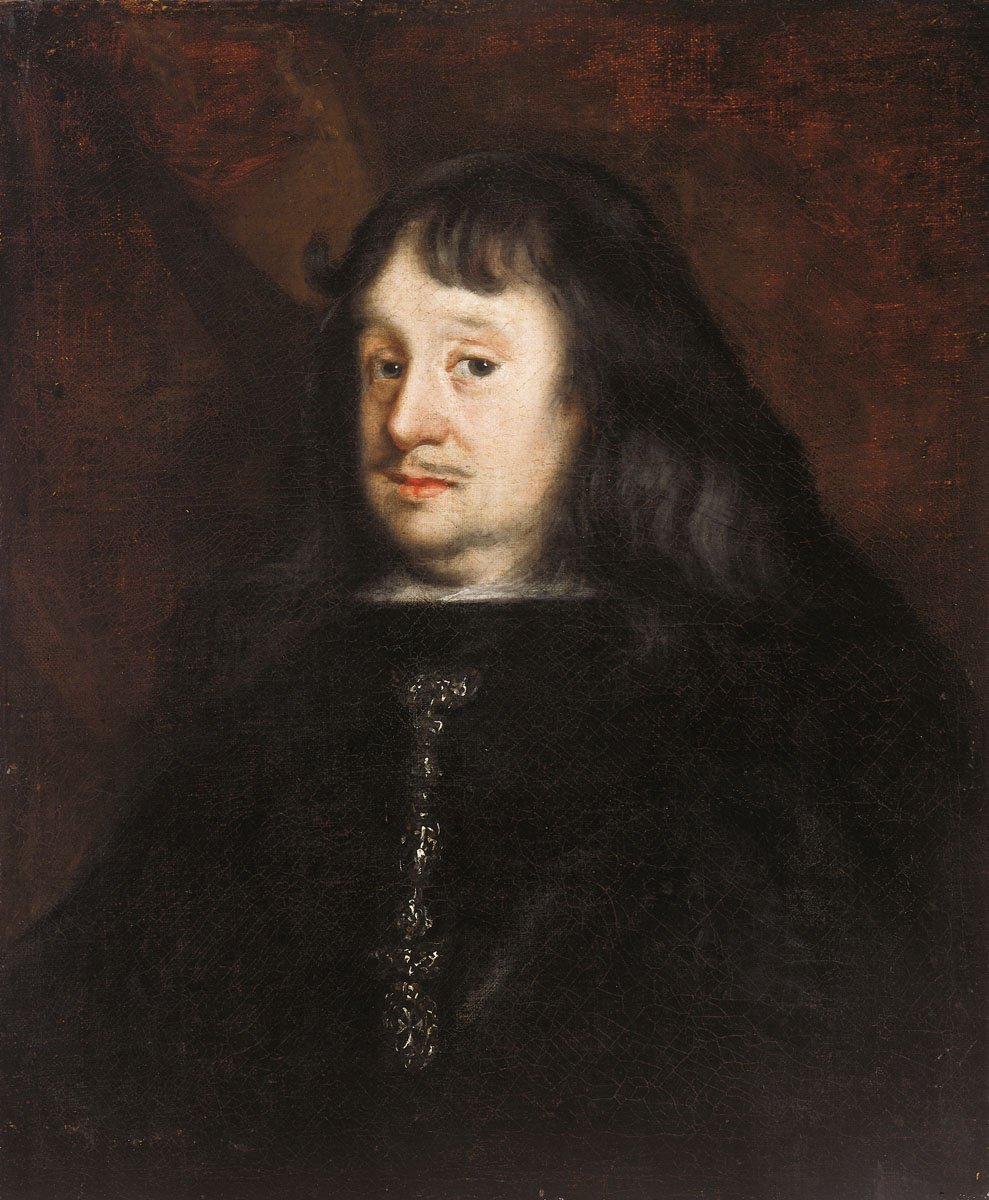
John Joseph of Austria by Juan Carreño de Miranda

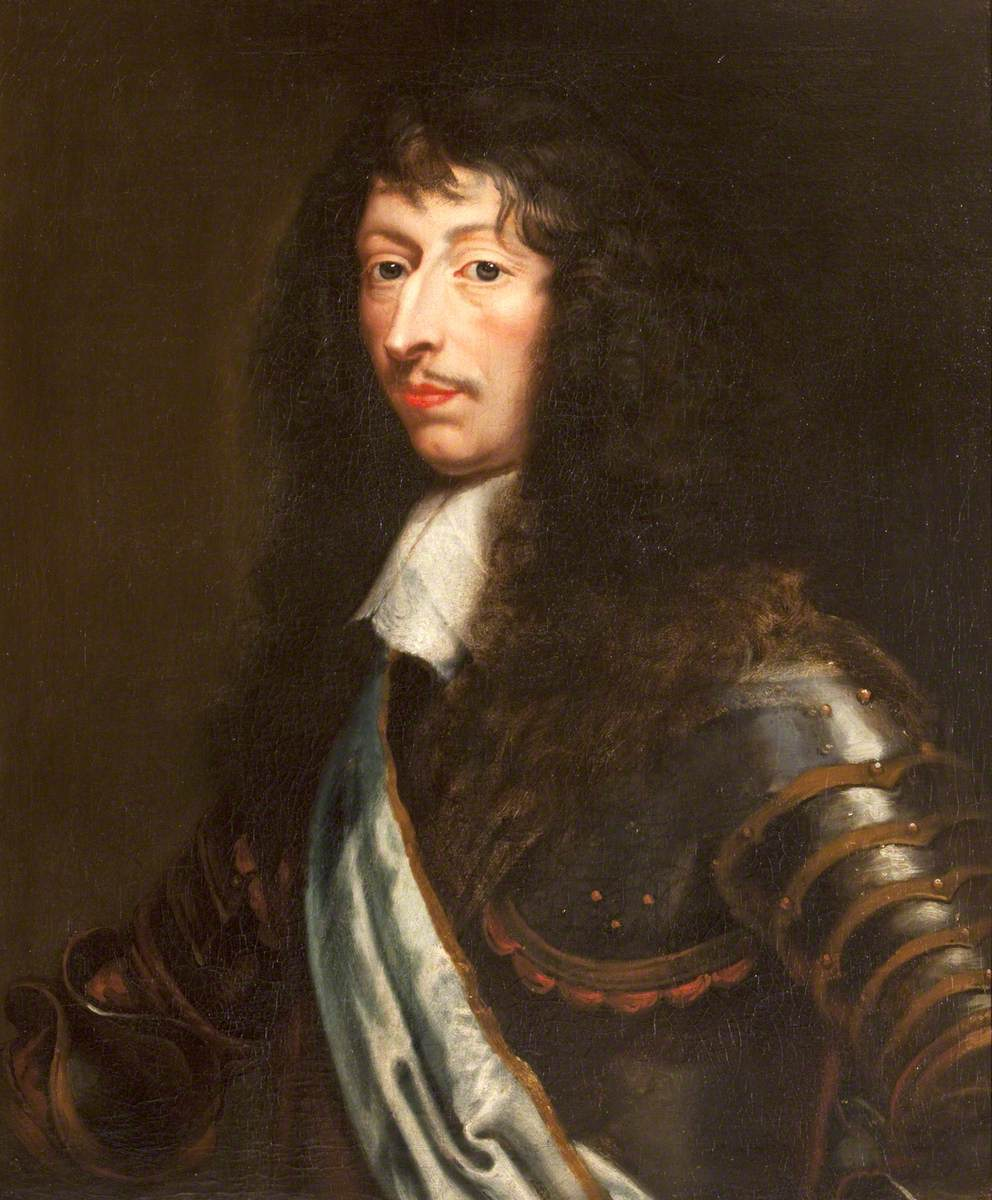
The Prince of Condé by the studio of Justus van Egmont.

Excluding the forces that had been left to guard the camp at Mount Houy, the Spanish army numbered about 10,000 infantry, 7,500 cavalry and 300 dragoons. Four or five Spanish tercios were present: the Tercio Viejo de los Estados de Flandes under Diego Goñi de Peralta, the Tercio Viejo de los Estados de Holanda under Juan Antonio Pacheco Osorio, the Tercio Viejo de los Estados de Brabante under Antonio Furtado de Mendonça, the tercio of Gabriel de Toledo and perhaps that of Gaspar Bonifaz. There were also three Italian tercios under Maestres de Campo Carafa, Campi and Bentivoglio. The Spanish and Italian troops were considered to be the finest soldiers in the army. Walloon units, composed by local combatants, included the tercios of the Prince of Steenhuyse, the Count of Megen, the Lord of Richebourg, the Count of Noyelle and Maestre de Campo Verkeest. Two or three Irish tercios were part of the army, namely those under the Count of Tyrone and Sean Murphy, and possibly the Tercio of Thomas Nelson. Five to eight German regiments were also present. A relation published shortly after the battle mentions those of Wolfgang of Bournonville, the Count of Nassau, the Baron of Lesbeguen, the Count of Hornes and the Duke of Aarschot and Count of Arenberg. The army of the Prince of Condé numbered 2,000 infantry, 3,500 cavalry and 300 dragoons, including the French regiments of Persan, Guitaut and Condé, and Irish regiments of Dempsey and O'Meagler, though most of them stayed at the camp of Mount Houy.

=== French army ===
The Army of Turenne had from 9,000 to 9,500 infantry soldiers from the French regiments of Gardes Françaises, Gardes Suisses, Bussy-Rabutin, Vervins, Dumbarton, Vandy, La Couronne, Montausier, Rambures, Bretagne, Vendôme, La Marine, Turenne and Picardy, and the Lorrainer regiments of Tornielles, Marasque, Konos, Kusac and de Cascar, plus 7,500 to 8,000 cavalry and up to 40 cannons. Of these men, 9,500 were lodged at Turenne's quarter, 4,000 at Ligneville's quarter, and a further 3,500 at Noailles quarter. La Ferté had 6,000 to 6,500 infantry soldiers from the regiments of Gardes Françaises, Gardes Suisses, Piemont, Espagny, Lignières, La Ferté, Belzunce, La Marine and Manchini, plus 3,500 to 4,000 cavalry and 15 cannons. On 9 July, the Count of Bussy stated in a letter that "order is so good among our troops, and our troops so well intended, that I expect the good success of our enterprise". After one month of siege, however, La Ferté's army was down to 8,000 or 9,000 men, which Bussy would later judge not enough to guard its circumvallation lines.

== Battle ==
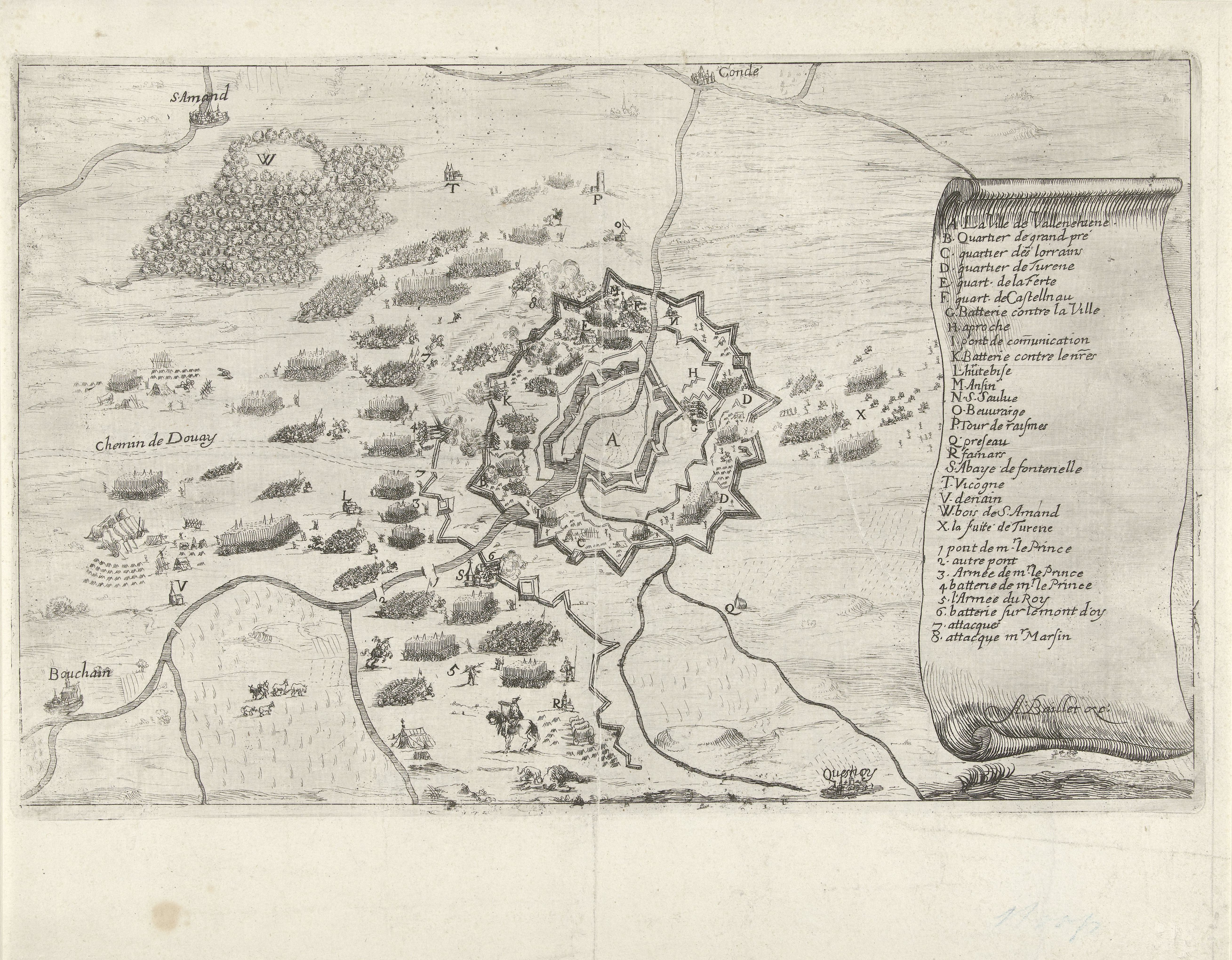
The relief of Valenciennes by the Spanish army on 16 July 1656, anonymous Flemish engraving.

The Spanish army positioned for the battle during the late hours of 15 July. A detachment of 1,000 men with cavalry, dragoons and musketeers stayed at Mount Houy with the heavy artillery to mask the manoeuvre of the main army, which was also covered by the high ground. Marsin was instructed to attack the quarter of La Ferté with his small detachment from the north, aiming at Beuvrages, as a feint, while the principal attack would come from the west over the French lines in direction to the village of Anzin. The Spanish right was commanded by the Marquis of Caracena and included six or seven infantry battalions formed by the Spanish and Irish tercios; the Prince of Ligne was in charge of the center, which comprised seven Walloon and Italian infantry battalions, and Condé led the left wing, formed by six German regiments and the Condéan Regiment of Persan. The infantry was deployed in two echelons. 18 cavalry squadrons closed the right wing and 31 the left, while 14 were kept in reserve. In all, the relief force numbered 20 battalions and 63 squadrons. Each infantry battalion included approximately 460 men, while each cavalry squadron had about 120 soldiers. Bournonville, for his part, had been instructed to open several locks to further flood the surrounding area and to attack La Ferté's army from its back using armed boats.

The fire of the Spanish heavy artillery from Mount Houy at 2.00 a.m. gave the signal to attack. Marsin, in command of 6 infantry battalions and 13 cavalry squadrons, 2,500 infantry and 1,500 cavalry in all, assaulted the French lines with vigour. However, he was forced to retreat after several failed attempts at breaching it in face of a strong defense by the Regiment des Gardes Suisses. The main attack proceeded with better success. Each section of the army was headed by a vanguard of musketeers armed with grenades. These men threw grenades over the French lines and then jumped into the ditches to scale the breastworks. On the right, the Spanish and Irish infantry under Caracena succeeded in taking the first and second line of works, as did the Germans under Condé in the left. The Walloons and Italians, however, were stopped by the heavy musketry fire from the Gardes Françaises. While hundreds of sappers worked to fill the ditches, remove the stockades and open ways for the cavalry, the infantry led by the Prince of Ligne launched new attacks on the center and, at the third time, succeeded in taking the second line of works.

While the Spanish attack was on progress, Turenne, on the opposite bank of the Scheldt, realised what was happening and urgently dispatched six infantry regiments to reinforce La Ferté across the fascine platform and the pontoon bridge. In the meantime, La Ferté launched a counterattack with his reserves, which included 18 cavalry squadrons, but the Spanish battalions, reinforced with the cavalry that had entered the battlefield across the ways opened by the sappers, drove them back. Bournonville attacked then from Valenciennes, and the French resistance collapsed. La Ferté was taken prisoner by a gentleman of François-Henri de Montmorency, duc de Luxembourg's entourage, while the survivors fled in disarray. Hundreds of them drowned while trying to cross the Scheldt north of Valenciennes. Just 2,500 men from La Ferté's army managed to escape, yet it was impossible for them to join Turenne, so they had to shelter themselves at the town of Condé. In the south, meanwhile, Caracena redeployed his troops to attack two of the regiments sent by Turenne which had already crossed the river and were quickly destroyed. Two hours after the beginning of the battle, the Spanish cavalry linked with the garrison of Valenciennes.

Realising that the battle was lost, by 6 a.m. Turenne ordered his troops to abandon their encampments leaving behind their artillery and baggage. The victorious Spanish cavalry moved across Valenciennes to fall upon the French infantry which was leaving the trenches. A French cavalry squadron under the Marquis of Resnel skirmished with the pursuers and allowed the foot soldiers to escape. The retreat to Le Quesnoy was covered by 15 squadrons under the Count of Bussy. They were followed just by two squadrons of Croatian cavalry in Spanish service, since the pontoon bridge that would have enabled the Spanish army to cross into the other side of the Scheldt was blocked by abandoned cannons and chariots, which prevented a general chase, Turenne was able to regroup his army by the evening. The French losses amounted to 7,000 to 8,000 men, including 2,500 to 3,000 prisoners, and 46 cannons. Large amounts of powder, bombs, grenades other ammunitions were also taken, plus 9 pontoons, 15 boats and hundreds of chariots. Besides this, 9,000 sacks of flour and several portable campaign mills were found at Turenne's quarter at the Abbey of Saint-Saulve. The booty taken by the Spanish troops, including silver cutlery and luxury clothes, was so big that the days following the battle the streets of Valenciennes were crowded of carts. The Spanish army lost 500 men during the battle and 200 to 300 during the siege.

== Aftermath ==
News of the Spanish victory at Valenciennes arrived at Brussels the same day that the battle was fought. On 21 July, the Council of State in Brussels ordered the raising of the siege to be marked by public celebrations. The city council of Antwerp did the same next day, and by 28 July the journalist Willem Scheybels published a detailed account of the battle. News soon reached The Hague too, where the French defeat was celebrated. In Madrid, Philip IV was informed about the victory on 1 August and attributed it do the divine intervention in a letter to his confidat, sor María Jesús de Ágreda, since 'we could only receive such a great benefit from his infinite goodness'. At Paris, Louis XIV and his court were afflicted by the news. The Queen mother of France, Anne of Austria consoled herself by saying that 'the prayers of the Spaniards sometimes had to obtain graces from heaven'. On the other hand, the many supporters of the Prince of Condé were exultant. A British Royalist in Paris reported to George Radcliffe, advisor to the Duke of York, that 'the consequence of this action is like to be very great. It is scarce credible what joy is in Paris for it out of their extream dislike of cardinal Mazarin'.

The outcome of the battle bolstered the reputation of John Joseph and earned him the respect of the Netherlandish population. Having refreshed his army, he moved immediately to besiege Condé. Cardinal Mazarin instructed Turenne to not lose Condé and Saint-Ghislain, considering that their lost would damage further the French prestige. The two towns, however, were located behind the Spanish lines, and Turenne, now in command of just 17,000 men, considered the Spanish position too strong to attempt a relief. He withdrew his army to Berlaimont and moved soon to Inchy to ravage the Lys basin, aiming at draw the Spanish army away from Condé. John Joseph did not lift the siege, and on 18 August the French garrison of Condé, numbering 2,772 infantry and 536 cavalry soldiers, surrendered to the Spanish Army. On the meantime, Turenne took the town of La Capelle after a brief siege.

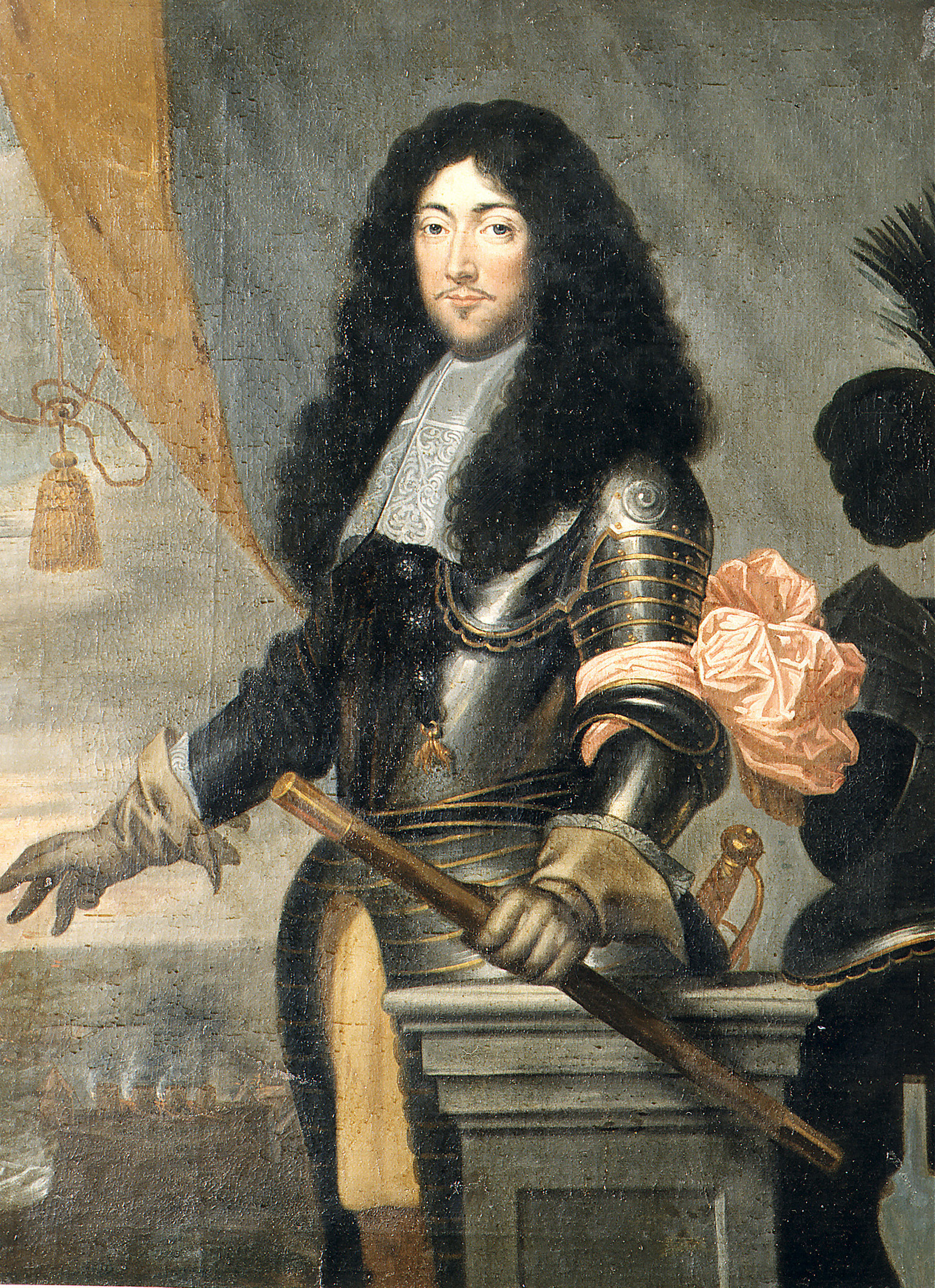
Portrait of the 7th Duke of Aarschot, who was promoted to general for his actions in the battle.

Both sides engaged in serious peace talks at Madrid during the summer, since shortly before the battle Mazarin had sent his confidant Hugues de Lionne to discuss peace terms with Philip IV and Luis de Haro. The French crown agreed to retire its support to the rebellious Portugal, as well as well as to evacuate its positions in Catalonia and restitute the Cerdanya, plus the Charolais and the towns of Thionville and Damvillers, in Luxemburg, and Béthune, Le Quesnoy and La Bassée, in Flanders. Philip IV accepted to recognize the French control over Artois and Alsace, and to return to France the towns of Rocroi and Le Catelet. The conversations ultimately failed because of the negative of Mazarin to restore the Prince of Condé his offices, which would enabled Philip to exert a direct influence over the French court, and by the refusal of the Spanish monarch to agree a marriage between her daughter and heir apparent, the infanta Maria Theresa, and Louis XIV.

In military terms, the Battle of Valenciennes resulted in the lose by France of thousands of veteran soldiers, which, in accordance to the Venetian ambassador in Paris, Giovan Battista Nani, meant that from there on, France was unable to mount fast and decisive campaigns. Since the magnitude of the defeat and the failure of the peace talks sparked a major crisis of confidence among the crown's creditors, Louis XIV's Superintendent of Finances, Fouquet, was forced to raise new revenues to float more loans, which generated agitation on a scale unprecedented since the Fronde, particularly in the Orléanais, Berry and Normandy. On 23 March 1657, the Army of Flanders took Saint-Ghislain after eight days of siege. Turenne invested Cambrai on 28 May, but the Prince of Condé relieved its garrison and forced the French army to retreat. Only the landing at France of 6,000 soldiers from the New Model Army after France allied with the English Commonwealth in March would allow the French to make some gains, namely the capture of Mardyck, yet their armies were defeated at Catalonia and Lombardy in the 1657 campaigns.

=== Rewards and promotions ===
Rewards were abundant among the Netherlandish noblemen who had fought at Valenciennes. Philippe-François d'Arenberg, who was shot through his hat when he attacked the French lines ahead his German soldiers, was promoted to general on 17 August 1656. Bournonville was given the title of prince by Philip IV on 12 September 1656. Maestre de Campo Francisco de Meneses, a commoner and a career soldier with more than thirty years of experience at the theaters of Naples, Lombardy, the Netherlands and Catalonia, was far less fortunate. Despite having played a key role at the defense of Valenciennes, his actions went unnoticed at the Spanish court. After Valenciennes, Meneses led the attack over Saint-Ghislain and fought with great distinction at the Battle of the Dunes, after he which he went to Madrid to ask for a promotion. The French ambassador to Philip IV, the Duke of Grammont, was surprised by the fact that 'he was so obscure that while we were in Madrid he was not allowed to speak either with the King or with the Admiral of Castille'.

== Legacy ==
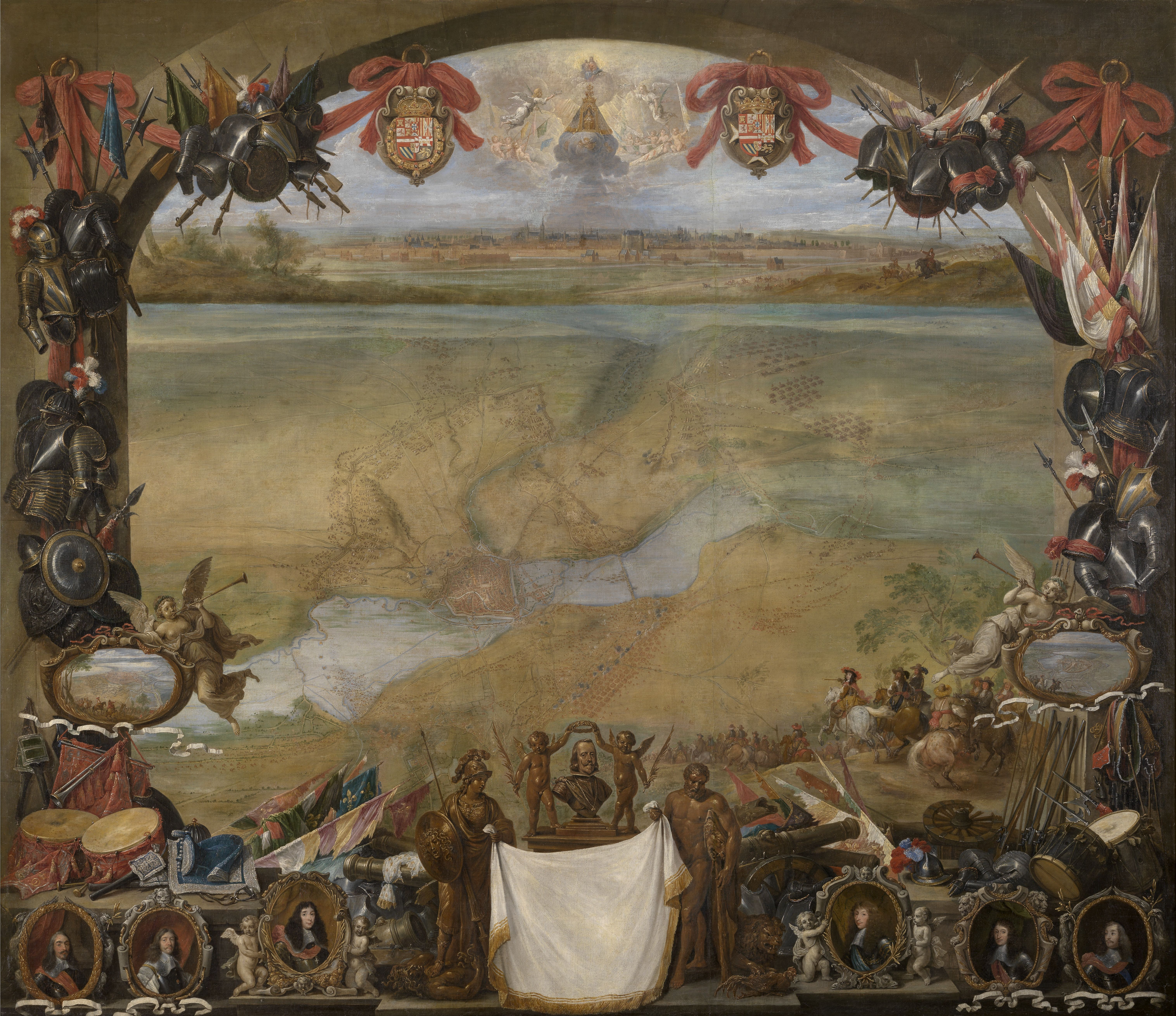
View of the Battle of Valenciennes, oil on canvas by David Teniers II.

The Battle of Valenciennes became the subject poems, songs, artworks, prints, coins, and publications, including several paintings by Flemish artists like David Teniers II and Pieter Snayers. Teniers, who was the court painter at Brussels, depicted the relief in a canvas using all the topographical, allegorical and rhetorical means of the Baroque imagery. The commanders of the army, including John Joseph, the Prince of Condé and the Marquis of Caracena, were portrayed along a bust of Philip IV. In the painting, John Joseph appears in horseback, performing a levade, a position which makes reference to his leadership abilities. Snayers, a celebrated battle artist, was commissioned to depict the battle in a large canvas. It was owned by the Count of Peñaranda, who had led the Spanish delegation at the Peace of Münster, and, on his death on 1676, it was acquired by Ferdinand Bonaventura von Harrach, Imperial ambassador at the Spanish court. The painting was much celebrated, and the rederijker Cornelis de Bie devoted more space to it in his work Het Gulden Cabinet (1662), a collection of biographical sketches of Flemish and Dutch painters, than to any other painting.

In the field of literature, the siege and the battle were sung in epinicia written by the pupils of the Jesuit colleges in the Netherlands. A theatre play was held at Valenciennes shortly before the relief 'with piquant jokes and sarcasm', as regretted by father François Annat, confessor of Louis XIV. Next year, a play entitled Josué, meant to praise John Joseph of Austria, was performed at Brussels in a great stage. In 1660, after the Peace of the Pyrenees, Juan Bautista Maldonado, rhetoric teacher at the College of Valenciennes, wrote a long poem entitled Palma Valentianae seu Valentiana liberata, praising Philip IV and John Joseph. Medals were another mean to celebrate the triumph. The Brabant medallist Waterloos cast a number of them in gold, silver and bronze, intended to be worn around the neck with a ribbon.

From the religious perspective, the Flemish canon and historian Antonius Sanderus, offered an explanation for the moment chosen by John Joseph to attack the French lines. He emphasized that the Siege of Valenciennes began on 15 June, the Feast of Corpus Christi, and that the French, led by the Protestant Turenne, by starting the siege that day, committed a sacrilege. On the other hand, the Spanish Army launched its attack the same day that the Eucharistic Miracle of Brussels was celebrated. John Joseph ordered the prayers, processions and ceremonies held at Brussels to be devoted to the success of the relief. The divine intervention is reflected as well in Tenier's painting, where, in the heavens above the battlefield, the Sacrament of Miracle appears beneath an enthroned Mary, amid celestial beams of light and angels with captured French flags, and also at Waterloos' medals, which, on the reverse, depicted the reliquary of the Blessed Sacrament of Miracles containing the three hosts, accompanied by an inscription.

== See also ==
- Philip IV of Spain
- Louis XIV of France
- Cardinal Mazarin
- Spanish Netherlands

== Bibliography ==
- Amigo Vázquez, Lourdes (2018). "La otra imagen del héroe. El Grand Condé como aliado del rey de España (1651-1659)". Investigaciones Históricas. Época Moderna y Contemporánea (in Spanish). 38 (38): 187–218. doi:10.24197/ihemc.38.2018.187-218. S2CID 239783440.
- Arblaster, Paul (2014). From Ghent to Aix: How They Brought the News in the Habsburg Netherlands, 1550-1700. Brill. ISBN 9789004276840.
- Bussy-Rabutin, Roger de (1731). Les memoires de messire Roger de Rabutin, comte de Bussy. Zacharie Chatelain.
- Bodart, Gaston (1908). Militär-historisches Kriegs-Lexikon (1618–1905).
- Delfosse, Annick (2008). "Quand la politique est conviée sur les planches. Spectacles, patriotisme et morale politique dans les collèges jésuites belges au XVIIe s". Cahiers du Centre de Recherches en Histoire du Droit et des Institutions (in French) (29): 33–55.
- Hénault, Maurice (1889). Récit du siège de Valenciennes en 1656, publié d'après le manuscrit original de Simon Le Boucq. Impr. Bonenfant.
- Israel, Jonathan Irvine (1997). Conflicts of Empires: Spain, the Low Countries and the struggle for World Supremacy 1585-1713. Hambledon. ISBN 9781852851613.
- González de León, Fernando (2009). The Road to Rocroi: Class, Culture and Command in the Spanish Army of Flanders, 1567-1659. Brill. ISBN 9789004170827.
- Maffi, Davide (2006). "Il potere delle armi. La monarchia spagnola e i suoi eserciti (1635-1700): una rivisitazione del mito della decadenza". Rivista Storica Italiana (in Italian). 118 (2): 394–445.
- Martínez del Barrio, Javier Ignacio (2008). "La colección de pintura española de los Harrach". Anales de Historia del Arte (in Spanish). Extraordinario: 291–306.
- Montglat, François de Clermont, marquis de (1853). Mémoires (in French). Guoyt Frères.
- Motteville, Françoise de (1855). Mémoires de Mme de Motteville sur Anne d'Autriche et sa cour (in French). Vol. IV. C. Charpentier.
- Nagelsmit, Eelco (2014). Venite et Videte: Art and Architecture in Brussels as Agents of Change during the Counter Reformation, c. 1609-1659 (PhD). Leiden University.
- Nagelsmit, Eelco (2017). "Religie als sleutel tot succes: De Slag bij Valenciennes door David Teniers de Jonge". Simulacrum (in Dutch). 25 (3–4): 45–54.
- Parrott, David (2020). 1652: The Cardinal, the Prince, and the Crisis of the 'Fronde'. Oxford University Press. ISBN 9780192518040.
- Picouet, Pierre A. (2020). The Armies of Philip IV of Spain 1621–1665. The Fight for European Supremacy. Helion & Company. ISBN 9781911628613.
- Quincy, Charles Sevin (1726). Histoire militaire du règne de Louis-le-Grand, roi de France. Vol. I. Denis Mariette.
- Ruiz Rodríguez, Ignacio (2007). Don Juan José de Austria en la Monarquía Hispánica: Entre la política, el poder y la intriga. Dykinson. ISBN 9788498490299.
- Silvela, Francisco (1886). Cartas de la venerable madre Sor María de Ágreda y del Señor Rey Don Felipe IV (in Spanish). Vol. II. Sucesores de Rivadeneyra.
- Stradling, R.A. (1994) Spain's struggle for Europe 1598-1668. London: Continuum International Publishing Group. ISBN 978-1-85285-089-0
- Thurloe, John (1742). A Collection of the State Papers of John Thurloe, Esq. Executor of Fletcher Gyles.
- Trápaga Monchet, Koldo (2015). "La percepción de don Juan de Austria en Flandes (1656–1659)". In Iglesias Rodríguez, Juan José; Pérez García, Rafael M.; Fernández Chaves, Manuel F. (eds.). Comercio y cultura en la Edad Moderna: actas de la XIII Reunión Científica de la Fundación Española de Historia Moderna. Comunicaciones (in Spanish). Universidad de Sevilla. pp. 2839–2852. ISBN 978-84-472-1746-5.
