= Henri de La Ferté-Senneterre =

- 1st Duke of La Ferté-Senneterre
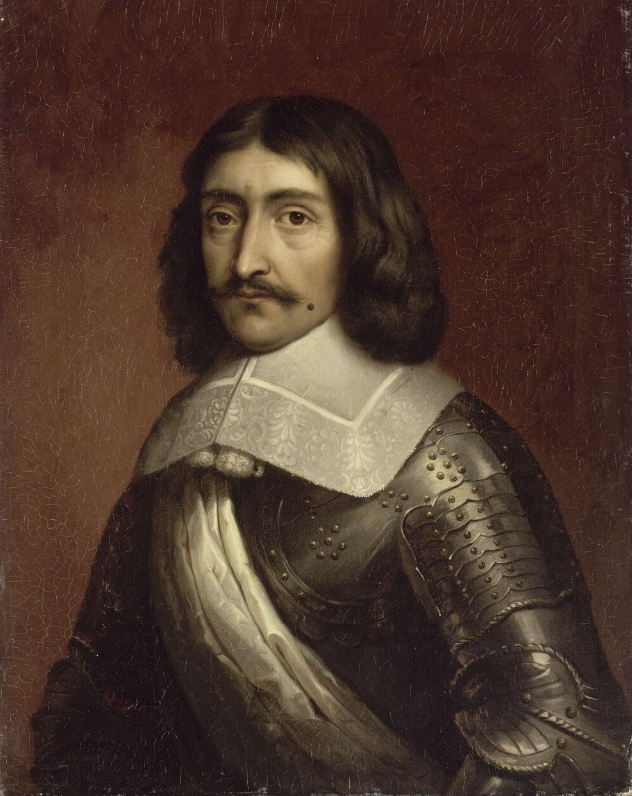
- Henri de La Ferté-Senneterre, 17th century
- Born: 1599
- Died: 27 September 1681 (aged 81–82)
- Spouses: Charlotte de Bauves; Madeleine d'Angennes (m. 1655)
- Father: Henri I de Saint-Nectaire
- Mother: Marguerite de La Châtre
- Military career
- Allegiance: Dutch Republic; Kingdom of France
- Rank: Marshal of France
- Wars: Dutch Revolt; Thirty Years' War; Franco-Spanish War

Henri de Saint-Nectaire, 1st Duke of La Ferté-Senneterre (1599 – 27 September 1681) was a marshal of France and governor of Lorraine.

== Life ==
The son of Henri I de La Ferté-Senneterre, a minister from an old knightly family in the Auvergne, Henri II was destined for a military career and fought for the first time under Maurice of Nassau, leader of the Dutch Revolt against Spain. On returning to France, he distinguished himself (as a captain in a regiment paid for by his father) in the siege of the Calvinist city of La Rochelle, begun in 1627–28 by Richelieu to put the rebel city back under the French king's control. In 1632 the French army invaded Lorraine and Henri II found himself before Nancy in 1633. On 25 September Louis XIII and Richelieu broke into Nancy and its 16,000 inhabitants were evacuated by the marquis de Mouis and his Lorrainian garrison. Becoming mestre de camp (equivalent to the modern rank of colonel), Henri II gained glory fighting the Spaniards at Hesdin on 29 June 1639 and, as a reward, Louis XIII made him maréchal de camp.

On 19 May 1643, five days after Louis XIII's death, Henri II fought in the victory at Rocroi against the Spaniards, as second in command of the French left wing, being wounded four times. Henri II's father was a favourite of queen Anne of Austria (regent of the kingdom of France on Louis XIII's death) and so Henri II was made governor of the duchy of Lorraine in 1643 to replace Lenoncourt. In 1644, he led to Nancy 23 infantry companies, a Swiss old guard, seven new city infantry companies and cavalry. He became lieutenant general in 1648 and marshal on 5 January 1651, remaining faithful to Anne and Mazarin during the Fronde.
Despite his brutal interventions to reestablish discipline among his troops (ever eager to plunder), he was not so disciplined with himself and lived off the country. Taken prisoner at the Battle of Valenciennes (1656), he was ransomed by Louis XIV. In reward for his good and loyal services, the marquisate of La Ferté-Senneterre was promoted to a duché-pairie by Louis XIV in November 1665.

Henri II de la Ferté-Senneterre died on 27 September 1681.

=== Marriage and children ===
He first married Charlotte de Bauves, daughter of Henri des Boves, baron de Contenant and councilor of state.
In his second marriage, he married on 25 April 1655, Madeleine d'Angennes (1629-1714), daughter of Charles d'Angennes.
Together they had:

1. Henri de de Saint-Nectaire (1655-1658)
2. Henri François de Saint-Nectaire (1657-1703), Duke of La Ferté-Senneterre, Lieutenant-General, married Marie de La Mothe-Houdancourt;
3. Louis de Saint-Nectaire (1659-1732), Lord of La Loupe, Jesuit priest;
4. Catherine Henriette de Saint-Nectaire (1662), wife of François de Bullion, Marquis de Longchesnes;
5. Hannibal Jules de Saint-Nectaire (1665-1702), abbot of Saint-Jean-d'Angély;
6. Cécile Adélaïde de Saint-Nectaire (1673-1720), wife of Louis César, Marquis of Rabodanges.

Madeleine had also an illegitimate son in 1670 by Charles Paris d'Orléans, Duke of Longueville.

== See also ==
- Madame de Saint-Baslemont

== Sources ==
- Manuel Bazaille : "1643 : Le retour d'Attila"; La Revue Lorraine Populaire; n°180; October 2004.
