= Battle of Fleurus (1690) =

Battle in the Nine Years' War between France and the Grand Alliance

Coordinates: 50.4833°N 4.5500°E

- Part of the Nine Years' War
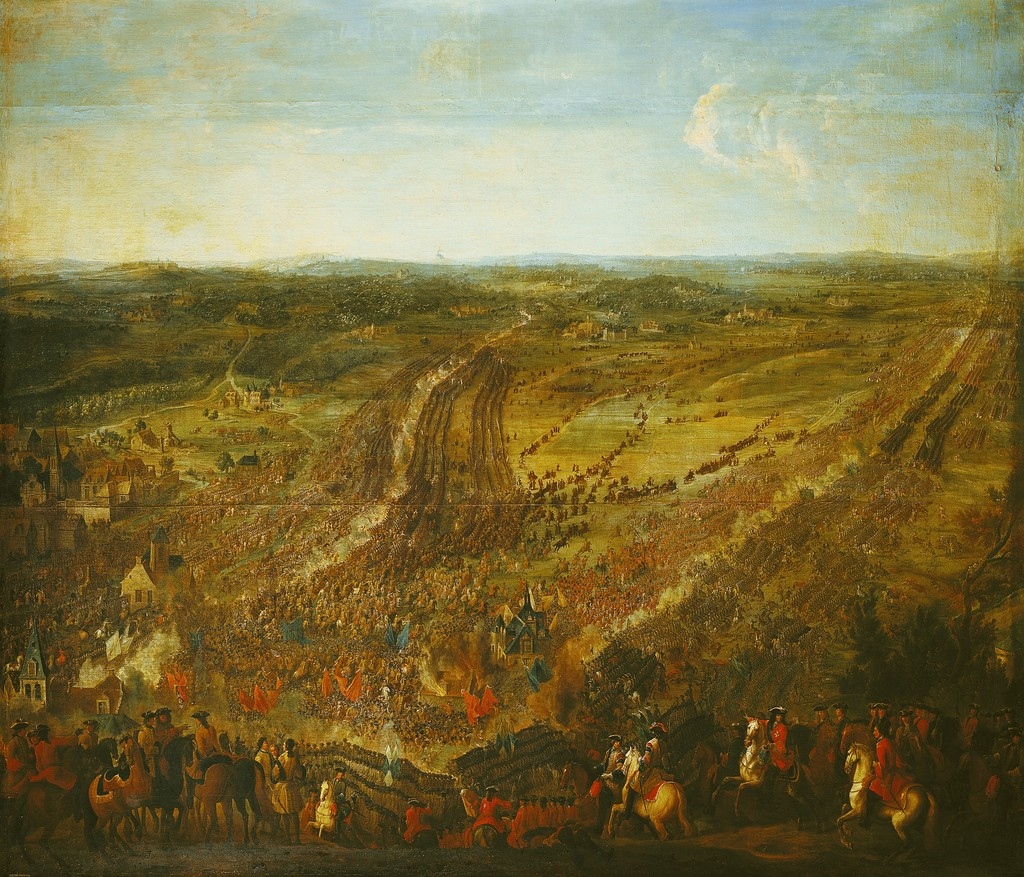
- Battle of Fleurus, Pierre-Denis Martin
Date	1 July 1690
Location	Fleurus, Spanish Netherlands
Result	French victory

Belligerents
France	Dutch Republic; Spain

Commanders and leaders
(Kingdom of France) François-Henri de Luxembourg	(Dutch Republic) Georg Friedrich of Waldeck

Strength
30,000–40,000 (Note: Estimates: • 30,000; • 35,000; • 40,000); 70 guns	30,000–38,000 (Note: Estimates: • 30,000; • 37,800–38,000); 90 guns

Casualties and losses
6,000-7,000 (Note: Estimates: • 3,600; • 6,000; • 7,000)	11,000–21,000 (Note: Estimates: • 11,000; • 19,000–21,000)

The Battle of Fleurus, fought on 1 July 1690 near Fleurus, then part of the Spanish Netherlands, now in modern Belgium, was a major engagement of the Nine Years' War. A French army led by Marshall Luxembourg defeated an Allied force under Waldeck.

Luxembourg's victory had limited strategic impact, since Louis XIV of France ordered him to end his campaign in the Spanish Netherlands, and instead reinforce the Dauphin on the Rhine. This gave the Allies time to withdraw to Brussels, and rebuild their army.

== Background ==
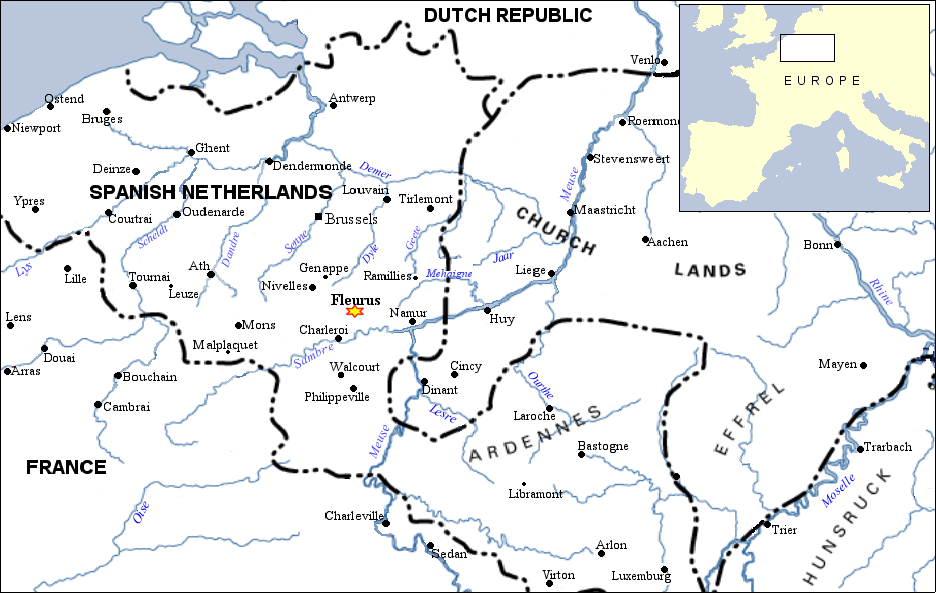
The Spanish Netherlands. Fleurus sits midway between Namur and Charleroi, near the river Sambre

In 1690, the main theatre of the Nine Years' War moved from the Rhineland to the Spanish Netherlands. Defeat at Walcourt in August 1689 led to Humières being replaced as commander by Luxembourg, who retained the position until he died in 1695. His army consisted of around 30,000–40,000 men, while if necessary, he could call upon support from Boufflers on the Moselle. With William III campaigning in Ireland, Waldeck, the victor of Walcourt, continued as commander of Allied forces in the region.

Waldeck had hoped to delay the campaign to enable the Elector of Brandenburg to move on the Moselle and tie down Boufflers, but Luxembourg's early manoeuvres had allowed Boufflers to move between the rivers Sambre and Meuse to support the French commander. Waldeck, meanwhile, left his assembly point at Tienen (Tirlemont) and advanced to Wavre. After dispersing his troops to live off forage, the Allied army reassembled and advanced to Genappe on 8 June.

In mid-June, Luxembourg split his forces. Humières was relegated to supervise the garrison of the Lines of the Lys and the Scheldt, whilst the main French army left Deinze and marched south, crossing the Sambre at Jeumont on 23 June. Meanwhile, detachments from Boufflers force under Rubantel had augmented Luxembourg's army, which continued its march, camping at Boussu on 27 June.

As Luxembourg manoeuvred south of Mons and Charleroi, Waldeck moved his camp between Nivelles and Pieton on 28 June. That same evening, Luxembourg personally led a detachment from Gerpinnes with pontoons to establish a bridge across the Sambre at Ham. A fortified position at Froidmont (garrisoned by about 100 men) was soon compelled to surrender after artillery was brought across the river; a simultaneous attack by French dragoons seized an enemy redoubt that had been abandoned at the approach of Luxembourg's army. With the bridgehead secure, the rest of the French army (apart from the heavy baggage that had remained on the south bank at Ham) crossed the Sambre on 30 June. (See map).

Waldeck decamped and moved towards the French bridgehead. French and Dutch cavalry sent out to reconnoitre the area crossed swords in an inconclusive action near Fleurus, but by evening the French cavalry had withdrawn to Velaine, where it was joined by the rest of their army, only 3 kilometres (1.9 mi) from the Allies.

== Battle ==
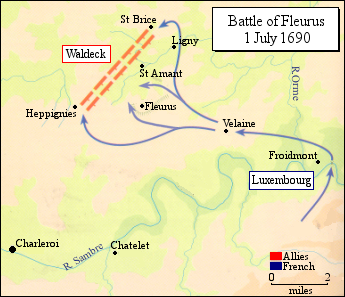
Luxembourg divides his forces and attacks Waldeck's army on both flanks.

On the morning of 1 July, Luxembourg marched his forces towards Fleurus. Waldeck had set up his 30,000-38,000 troops in the two customary lines on the high ground between the village of Heppignies on their right and past the chateau of St Amant on their left; Waldeck's front was covered by the Orme stream whose elevated banks made a frontal assault all but impossible.

Luxembourg decided to attack both flanks of the Allied army simultaneously, an audacious plan whose success required secrecy and deception. The columns of the first French line split to take position between Heppignies and Fleurus, with some troops moving up towards St Amant. The two columns of Luxembourg's right veered off to the north across the Orme, their passage covered by the hedges and wheat fields, and by a screen of French cavalry. Forty cannons were positioned near the chateau of St Amant, and another 30 guns positioned between the chateau and Fleurus.

Unbeknownst to Waldeck, Luxembourg had enveloped his flanks. Had the Allied commander realised that Luxembourg had split his army in two, he might have overwhelmed the isolated French left before the right came into position, but he did not. After the French right wing was in position (commanded by Luxembourg himself), their artillery opened fire at about 10:00, striking the Allied infantry with great effect. The French left wing, commanded by Lieutenant-General Jean Christophe, comte de Gournay, opened their attack with a cavalry charge but Gournay was killed in the assault; his death disordered his cavalry which withdrew to Fleurus to regroup.

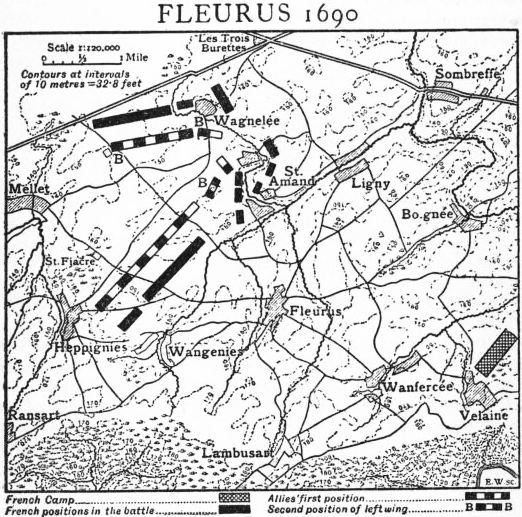
Battle of Fleurus 1690, from 1911 Encyclopædia Britannica.

A French cavalry charge on the right wing however, met with more success, driving the enemy cavalry back. What ensued from that point on varies depending on the sources. John A. Lynn states that, on the heels of the cavalry assault, the French infantry now advanced against both flanks of Waldeck's line which, finding itself enveloped, finally broke. Some of the Allied troops managed to regroup on high ground near Fleurus, but were eventually overwhelmed. Despite being pressed by French cavalry, Waldeck was able to create a new line with his remaining forces further back. However, this line also collapsed, broken by French infantry flushed with confidence from their initial success. The remainder of Waldeck's troops streamed towards Nivelles in the best order they could.

According to Olaf Van Nimwegen however, on the critical moment Waldeck and Aylva found themselves enveloped by the French, they ordered the Dutch infantry to form squares. This succeeded and the advancing French cavalry was forced to break off the assault. The French infantry, ordered to march straight onto the enemy, also failed to break the squares after suffering heavy casualties. Luxembourg, noticing the senselessness of further assaults decided to break the Dutch infantry by bombarding the thick squares from close range with captured artillery. To his surprise, despite heavy casualties the Dutch retained formation, and one of his adjutants, who could no longer stand to see the bloodshed, tried to negotiate their capitulation. After the battle, Luxembourg wrote to Louivois that "he told them that they were completely enveloped, that I [Luxembourg] was there and that I would spare them. They answered him: Leave; we want nothing, and are strong enough to defend ourselves." A Dutch eyewitness wrote:

... the cavalry abandoned that that brave infantry, which the Prince [of Waldeck] led like a hero. They stood like walls and fought like lions, so much so that I have never in my life seen or witnessed anything like it. In the end, through the abandonment by the cavalry and the fierce fighting of the French, we were forced to quit the field.

A stubborn rearguard action followed. Waldeck and Aylva moved the troops in squares in the direction of Mellet and from there to Brussels, while the Dutch battalions in the rear formed an alternating front to the French. Under this covering fire the troops under Waldeck left the battlefield. The Dutch right flank under Henry Casimir II and the Prince of Nassau-Usingen sought refuge in the vicinity of the guns of Charleroi.

== Aftermath ==
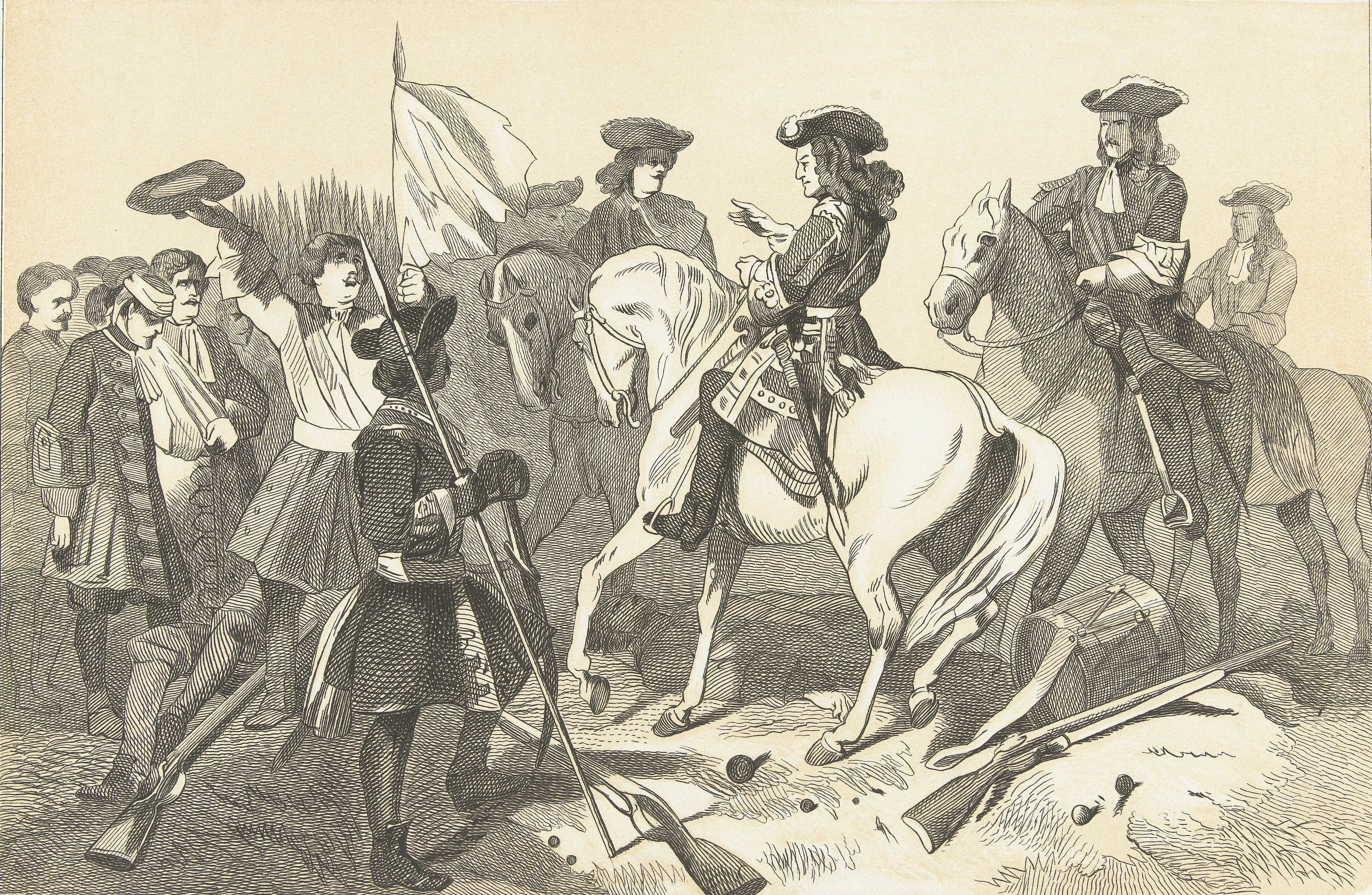
Waldeck and Dutch soldiers after the battle.

Fleurus was one of the bloodiest battles of the age, with enormous losses on both sides, but casualty estimates vary greatly. According to Austrian historian Gaston Bodart, the French had 3,000 men killed and another 3,000 wounded, and the allies suffered 6,000 killed, 5,000 wounded and 8,000 captured. Périni writes that 612 officers and 3,000 soldiers were killed or wounded on the French side, and that the allies had 5,000 killed and 9,000 captured, but does not mention a number of wounded. Additionally, the French took 48 guns and 150 flags or standards. Van Nimwegen and John Childs, however, reduce allied casualties to 7,000 killed and wounded and argue that French losses were at least equal, but do not provide an estimate for the number of prisoners, a number some Dutch sources bring down to 3,000.

The Allies also captured 34 banners and standards, which was rare for a losing side. Dutch historians have generally emphasized the bravery and skill of their infantry and often quote Luxembourg, who is reported to have said that the Dutch foot soldiers surpassed those of the Spanish at Rocroi (where he had served under Condé) and that he wanted to remember them all his life. French historian François Guizot described Fleurus as a complete French victory, but one devoid of result. Louvois, Louis' war minister, wanted to order Luxembourg to immediately besiege Namur or Charleroi, but Louis XIV, concerned about the Dauphin's forces on the Rhine, ordered Luxembourg to detach part of his forces and forgo a major siege. Louvois objected, but King Louis wanted to be sure that nothing 'disagreeable' happened to his son's command. Nevertheless, Luxembourg was able to put much of the land east of Brussels under contribution.

The French pressed the prisoners of war captured at Fleurus and in preceding events into their service. They sent the Germans to the army in Catalonia, the Walloons to Germany and the Dutch to Savoy. Many however escaped and made it back to allied territories.

Waldeck eventually retired on Brussels, where his injured troops were replaced with men from fortress garrisons. 15,000 Spanish troops under the Marquis of Gastañaga joined the main Allied army, as did Tilly with troops from Liège and Brandenburg on 22 July. On 2 August, the Elector of Brandenburg's forces combined with Waldeck, whose Allied army now numbered 70,000 men. With this force, the Allied army marched to Genappe, proceeding on to Nivelles on 7 August. After the battle, there was modest satisfaction in the Dutch Republic. They believed that the French had suffered more soldiers killed or wounded and the French army was indeed in no better shape than that of the Allies to continue the campaign.

The remainder of the campaign season in the Spanish Netherlands was relatively quiet. Boufflers temporarily combined his forces with Luxembourg, but in late August he returned to the area between the Sambre and Meuse rivers. After a series of minor skirmishes, both the Allies and the French returned to winter quarters in October; Luxembourg careful to station his men on enemy territory, while the Allies quartered in and around Maastricht. The Hanoverians returned home, while many from Brandenburg and Lüneburg found quarters in the fortresses of the Spanish Netherlands.

Louis XIV had become so disillusioned with his infantry that he ordered Luxembourg to avoid infantry engagements in 1691. He believed such an engagement "involves heavy losses and is never decisive".

== See also ==
- Trois Burettes
