= Friedrich August Wilhelm von Brause =

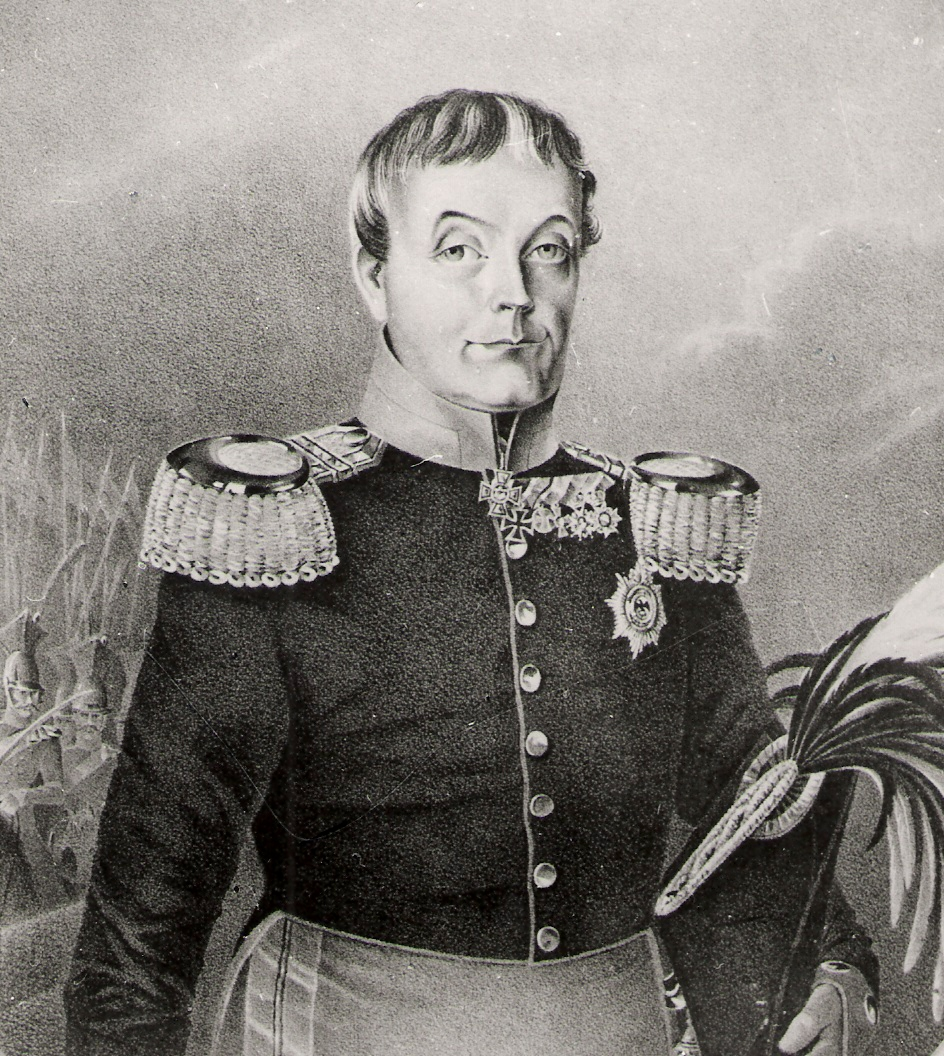
Friedrich August Wilhelm von Brause (1769–1836)

General der Infanterie Friedrich August Wilhelm von Brause (10 September 1769 in Zeitz – 23 December 1836 in Frankfurt (Oder)) was a Prussian officer who fought in the Napoleonic Wars.
