= Antoine de Pas de Feuquières =

French writer and military general (1648-1711)

Antoine de Pas, Marquis de Feuquières
- Born: 16 April 1648; Paris, France
- Died: 27 January 1711 (aged 62); Versailles, France
- Military career
- Allegiance: Kingdom of France
- Service years: 1643–1694
- Rank: Lieutenant General
- Conflicts: War of Devolution; Franco-Dutch War; Nine Years' War; Battle of Landen 1693; War of the Spanish Succession; Blemheim 1704
- Other work: Pair de France

Antoine de Pas, Marquis de Feuquières (16 April 1648 – 27 January 1711) was a French writer and soldier, who served in the wars of Louis XIV. He was the son of diplomat Isaac de Pas de Feuquières and grandson of Isaac Manasses de Pas, Marquis de Feuquieres.

== Life ==
Antoine de Pas, Marquis de Feuquières (16 April 1648 – 27 January 1711) was the eldest son of Isaac de Pas, Marquis de Feuquières (1618–1688) and Louise de Gramont (1627–1666), daughter of Antoine, duc de Gramont and Marshall of France. His father was French Ambassador to Sweden from 1672 to 1682, then in Spain until his death in Madrid in 1688 but like his grandfather, Isaac Manasses de Pas, Antoine chose a military career.

Originally from the Pas-en-Artois, from which they took their name, the family estates were in Feuquières, part of the Oise department in Northern France.

He was conspicuous for his bravery in the army of Louis XIV, serving under Luxembourg, Turenne and Catinat.

He was involved in the Affair of the Poisons, when Adam Lesage alleged that he and his cousin François-Henri de Montmorency, duc de Luxembourg had asked Lesage to supply them with poison. He was examined in 1680 but no case was found against him: his military career was not impeded.

It was his action which determined the Battle of Neerwinden (1693), in which he was lieutenant-general.

His Mémoires de M. le Marquis de Feuquiere, lieutenant general des armées du roi: contenans les maximes sur la guerre, & l'application des exemples aux maximes ran to 42 editions between 1736 and 2014 and was translated into three languages. Completed just before his death in 1711, it was highly critical of Louis XIV and remained unpublished until 1736. Voltaire later used it as a source for his own work, "Siècle de Louis XIV".

The Hôtel de Feuquières was named after Antoine de Pas de Feuquières.
