= François-Henri de Montmorency, duc de Luxembourg =

French general (1628–1695)

Marshal François Henri de Montmorency-Bouteville duc de Piney-Luxembourg
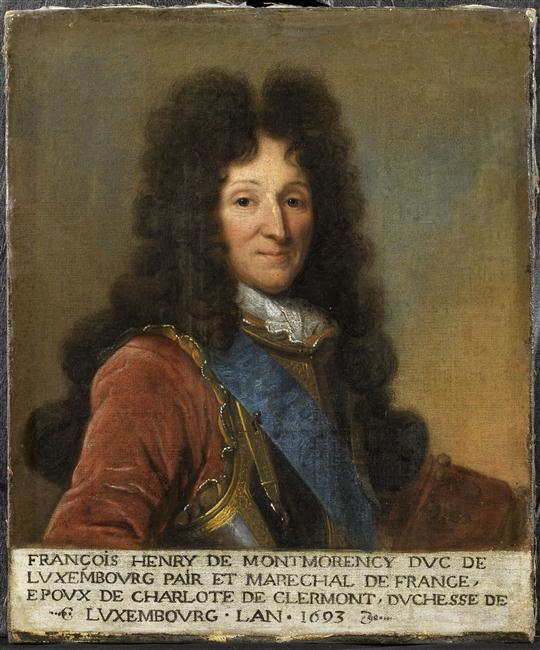
- Le Duc de Piney-Luxembourg
- Born: 8 January 1628; Paris, France
- Died: 4 January 1695 (aged 66); Versailles, France
- Military career
- Allegiance: Kingdom of France
- Service years: 1643–1694
- Rank: Marshal of France
- Nickname: Le Tapissier de Notre-Dame
- Conflicts: Thirty Years' War; Fronde; Franco-Spanish War; War of Devolution; Franco-Dutch War; Battle of Woerden; Battle of Seneffe; Siege of Valenciennes; Battle of Cassel; Battle of Saint-Denis; War of the League of Augsburg; Battle of Fleurus; Battle of Leuze; Battle of Steenkerque; Battle of Neerwinden
- Other work: Pair de France

François Henri de Montmorency-Bouteville, duc de Piney-Luxembourg, commonly known as Luxembourg (8 January 1628 – 4 January 1695), and nicknamed "The Upholsterer of Notre-Dame" (Le Tapissier de Notre-Dame), was a French general and Marshal of France. A comrade and successor of the Great Condé, he was one of the most accomplished military commanders of the early modern period and is particularly noted for his exploits in the Franco-Dutch War and War of the Grand Alliance. Not imposing physically, as he was a slight man and hunchbacked, Luxembourg was nonetheless one of France's greatest generals.

== Early years ==
François Henri de Montmorency was born in Paris. His father, François de Montmorency-Bouteville, had been executed six months before his birth for participating in a duel against the Marquis de Beuvron. His aunt, Charlotte Marguerite de Montmorency, Princess of Condé, took charge of him and educated him with her son, the Duke of Enghien. The young Montmorency (or Bouteville as he was then called) attached himself to his cousin, and shared his successes and reverses throughout the troubles of the Fronde. He returned to France in 1659 and was pardoned, and Condé, then much attached to the Duchess of Châtillon, Montmorency's sister, contrived the marriage of his adherent and cousin to the greatest heiress in France, Madeleine de Clermont de Luxembourg, Princess of Tingry and heiress of the Luxembourg dukedom (in 1661), after which he was created Duke of Luxembourg and peer of France.

== Luxembourg as general ==
=== War of Devolution and the Franco-Dutch War ===
At the opening of the War of Devolution (1667–68), Condé, and consequently Luxembourg, had no command, but during the second campaign he served as Condé's lieutenant general in the conquest of Franche-Comté. During the four years of peace which followed, Luxembourg cultivated the favour of Louvois, and in 1672 held a high command against the Dutch during the Franco-Dutch War (1672–1678). He defeated a counterattack by the Prince William III of Orange at Woerden but was blocked by the Dutch Water Line. On 27 December the inundations were frozen over and he began to cross over the ice, but a sudden thaw cut his force in half. Retreating, de Luxembourg found the fortress town of Bodegraven abandoned by its garrison and ordered the entire civilian population to be burned alive with their houses. The Dutch anti-French propaganda quickly exploited this massacre and when de Luxembourg bragged to Louis XIV that he had roasted any Dutchman he could find in the town, he was surprised to find that some at court considered such cruelties unnecessary. In 1673, after the fall of Bonn to his opponents, he made his famous retreat from Utrecht to Maastricht while severely outnumbered, an exploit which placed him in the first rank of generals. In 1674 he was made captain of the Garde du Corps, and in 1675 Marshal of France.

On 10 March 1676 (N.S.) he was made commander of the Army of the Rhine replacing Condé, who was in bad health. However, he could not relieve the siege of Philippsburg. This fortress had been invested by Imperial troops under Charles V, Duke of Lorraine on 1 May. Luxembourg could neither break through the defenses of Wissembourg established by the Imperials, nor draw them out to do battle. Philippsburg fell on 17 September. In 1677 he stormed Valenciennes and defeated William of Orange again at Cassel. In 1678 William forced Luxembourg from his positions at Saint-Denis after the signature of the Peace of Nijmegen.

=== Affair of the Poisons ===
Despite this his reputation was now high and it is reputed that he quarrelled with Louvois, who managed to involve him in the "Affair of the Poisons" and get him sent to the Bastille. Rousset in his Histoire de Louvois has shown that this quarrel is probably apocryphal. Luxembourg doubtlessly spent some months of 1680 in the Bastille, but on his release took up his post at court as capitaine des gardes.

Adam Lesage alleged that her brother-in-law had attempted to poison a governor as well as his wife, and for having bought magical services in order to arrange a marriage between his son and the daughter of Louvois as well as for making his sister-in-law the Princesse de Tingry to fall in love with him; he denied the accusations, and commented that while he was proud to have the "friendship" of his sister-in-law, he had no reason to wish the death of his wife. He was ultimately acquitted from the accusations. After a period of exile in the country side, he was officially welcome back to court in July 1681.

=== War of the Grand Alliance 1688-97 ===
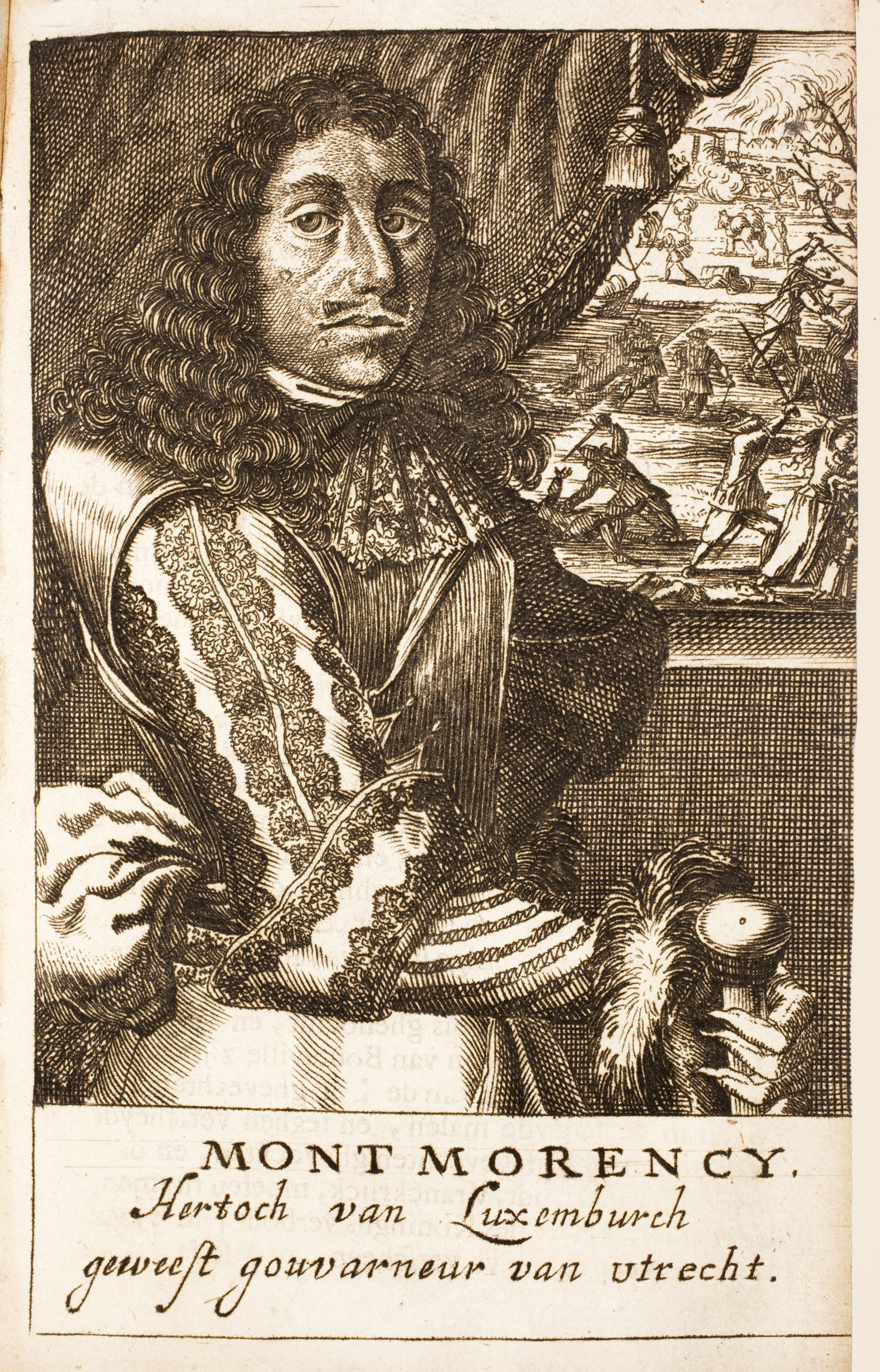
Dutch engraving of Montmorency; in the background his troops massacre Dutch civilians

By 1690, during the War of the Grand Alliance, Luxembourg was entrusted with the command of King Louis' army in the Spanish Netherlands, superseding Louis de Crevant, Duke of Humières. On 1 July 1690, he won his greatest victory over William's allied commander, the Prince of Waldeck, at Fleurus. Strategically the battle however changed little. In the following year his cavalry showed its superiority at Leuze, despite being eventually thrown back.

In the next campaign he covered the king's 1692 Siege of Namur and repulsed a surprise attack of William at Steenkerque in 1692. On 29 July 1693, Luxembourg won the most famous of his battles over his eternal adversary at Neerwinden, after which he was called "Le Tapissier de Nôtre Dame" (The Upholsterer of Notre Dame) due to the number of captured enemy flags that he sent to the cathedral. However, his last victory would be devoid of strategic results. The heavy losses suffered by his army stalled his campaign and his soldiers mutinied after which Louis XIV ordered Luxembourg to return to the French border. He was received with enthusiasm at Paris by all but the king, who looked coldly on a relative and adherent of the Condés. St-Simon describes in the first volume of his Memoirs how, instead of ranking as eighteenth peer of France according to his patent of 1661, he claimed through his wife to be duc de Piney of an old creation of 1571, which would place him second on the roll. The affair is described with St-Simon's usual interest in the peerage, and was chiefly checked through his assiduity.

In the campaign of 1694, Luxembourg did little in Flanders, except conducting a famous march from Vignemont to Tournai in face of the enemy.

== Death ==
On his return to Versailles for the winter he fell ill, and died. In his last moments he was attended by the famous Jesuit priest Bourdaloue, who said on his death, "I have not lived his life, but I would wish to die his death." Luxembourg was considered immoral, even in those times, but as a general he was Condé's grandest pupil. Though slothful like Condé in the management of a campaign, at the moment of battle he seemed seized with happy inspirations, against which no ardour of William's and no steadiness of Dutch or English soldiers could stand. His death and Nicolas Catinat's disgrace close the second period of the military history of the reign of Louis XIV.

== Reputation ==
St-Simon said of Luxembourg:

...in his final calculations no one was ever more conscientious than M. de Luxembourg; no one more brilliant, prudent and far-sighted in the face of the enemy or in battle. He had daring and confidence, and at the same time a cool-headedness that allowed him to observe and foresee in the midst of the fiercest cannonade, in dangerously critical moments. That was when he was truly great. At all other times he was idleness itself; no exercise, except where absolutely necessary; gambling; conversing with intimates; every night a small supper party; nearly always with the same company, and, if they happened to be near a town, an agreeable mingling of the sexes.

He was distinguished for a pungent wit. One of his retorts referred to his deformity. "I never can beat that cursed humpback", William was reputed to have said of him. "How does he know I have a hump?" retorted Luxembourg, "he has never seen my back." He left four sons, the youngest of whom was a marshal of France as Marechal de Montmorency.

Apart from his ability as a commander Luxembourg was also known for his cruelty. The historian Luc Panhuysen writes:

His style of leadership was marked by a great indifference toward the subjugated population. Luxembourg could speak lightly, almost with amusement, about the suffering of his victims. Cruelty was not an end in itself for him, but rather an unavoidable by-product. The duke’s capacity for empathy was entirely focused on the well-being of his own troops. [...] Officers and common soldiers alike admired him because he led them in the charge in all weather, even on foot if necessary. He stood among them, shouting himself hoarse to urge them on. He also joined his men in their amusements. When a Dutch supplier dared to venture into his view with his daughter, he briefly took her into an adjoining room. He gave his men the cohesion of a tribal bond: discipline among themselves, lawlessness toward others. During the many foraging expeditions along the waterline, he did not stand in their way when they engaged in arson and rape.

His harsh conduct during the campaigns in the Dutch Republic in 1672 and 1673 went so far that even some courtiers in Versailles and other compatriots felt he had gone too far.

== Marriage and children ==
On 17 March 1661 François-Henri de Montmorency married Madeleine de Clermont-Tonnerre (1635–1701), duchess of Luxembourg, princess of Tingry, countess of Ligny, baroness of Dangu, and had 5 children:

- Charles Frédéric de Montmorency-Luxembourg (1662–1726), duc de Piney-Luxembourg, father of Charles II Frédéric (1702–1764) Marshal of France (1757);
- Pierre Henri de Montmorency-Luxembourg (1663–1700), abbot of Saint-Michel d'Orcamp;
- Paul Sigismond de Montmorency-Luxembourg (1664-1731), duc de Châtillon, comte de Luxe and baron d'Apremont;
- Angelique Cunegonde de Montmorency-Luxembourg (1666–1736), mademoiselle de Luxembourg; married Louis Henri de Bourbon, bâtard de Soissons, Count of Dunois, illegitimate son of Louis de Bourbon, Count of Soissons, and had issue; had two children;
- Christian Louis de Montmorency-Luxembourg (1675–1746), prince de Tingry, comte de Luxe, pair de France, Marshal of France (1734).
