= Versailles (TV series) =

2015 historical fiction television series

- Genre: Historical drama
- Created by: Simon Mirren; David Wolstencroft
- Written by: Simon Mirren; David Wolstencroft; Sasha Hails; Andrew Bampfield; Tim Loane; Martha Hillier; Steve Bailie
- Directed by: Jalil Lespert; Christoph Schrewe; Thomas Vincent; Daniel Roby; Mike Barker; Louis Choquette; Richard Clark; Edward Bazalgette; Peter Van Hees
- Starring: George Blagden; Alexander Vlahos; Tygh Runyan; Stuart Bowman; Amira Casar; Evan Williams; Noémie Schmidt; Anna Brewster; Sarah Winter; Suzanne Clément; Catherine Walker; Elisa Lasowski; Maddison Jaizani; Jessica Clark; Pip Torrens; Harry Hadden-Paton; Greta Scacchi
- Opening theme: "Outro" by M83
- Composers: NOIA; Michel Corriveau
- Countries of origin: Canada; France; United Kingdom; United States
- Original languages: English; French
- No. of seasons: 3
- No. of episodes: 30

Production
- Executive producers: Jean Bureau; Claude Chelli; Anne Thomopoulos; Simon Mirren; David Wolstencroft; Guillaume Thouret; Gaspard de Chavagnac
- Producers: Ian Whitehead; Jean Bureau; Aude Albano; Claude Chelli; Anne Thomopoulos; Simon Mirren; David Wolstencroft
- Production locations: France; Canada
- Cinematography: Pierre-Yves Bastard
- Editors: Mike Fromentin; Sarah Anderson; Jean-François Elie
- Production companies: Capa Drama; Incendo; Zodiak Fiction; Nomad Media
- Budget: 30 million €

Original release
- Network: Canal+ (France); Super Channel (Canada); BBC Two (UK); Ovation (USA)
- Release: 16 November 2015 – 21 May 2018

Versailles is a historical drama television series, set during the construction of the Palace of Versailles during the reign of Louis XIV. A co-production between France, Canada, the United Kingdom and United States, the series premiered on 16 November 2015 on Canal+ in France and on Super Channel in Canada in May 2016 on BBC Two in Britain, and on 1 October 2016 on Ovation in the United States.

A second season was ordered prior to the season one premiere. Filming for the second season began in February 2016; its story took place four years after that of the first season. The second season premiered on 27 March 2017 in France and aired from 21 April 2017 in Britain. On 14 September 2016, producer Claude Chelli confirmed that Versailles had been renewed for a third season, which began filming in April 2017. On 17 April 2018, Variety reported that the third season of Versailles would be its last.

== Plot introduction ==
In the wake of the Fronde in 1667, the French nobility had begun to defy and disobey the monarchy. Young King Louis XIV (George Blagden) decides to move the court from the Château de Saint-Germain-en-Laye near Paris to his father's former hunting lodge near the hamlet of Versailles as a means to force their submission. As Louis renovates and expands his new Palace of Versailles, the nobles—displaced from their usual surroundings, but compelled to accompany the king—become embroiled in increasingly dangerous intrigues.

== Cast ==
=== Main ===
- George Blagden as Louis XIV, King of France
- Alexander Vlahos as Monsieur Philippe I, Duke of Orléans, brother of the king
- Tygh Runyan as Fabien Marchal, the king's chief of police
- Stuart Bowman as Alexandre Bontemps, valet of the king
- Amira Casar as Béatrice, Madame de Clermont (season 1)
- Evan Williams as Chevalier de Lorraine, lover of the Duke of Orléans
- Noémie Schmidt as Henrietta of England, first wife of Philippe (main: season 1; guest: season 2)
- Anna Brewster as Françoise-Athénaïs, Marquise de Montespan, the king's favourite mistress
- Sarah Winter as Louise de La Vallière (season 1)
- Suzanne Clément as Madame Agathe (season 2), a sorceress based on La Voisin
- Catherine Walker as Madame Scarron, later Madame de Maintenon (seasons 2–3)
- Elisa Lasowski as Marie-Thérèse, queen consort of France
- Maddison Jaizani as Sophie de Clermont, Béatrice's daughter, later the Duchesse de Cassel
- Jessica Clark as Elizabeth Charlotte, Princess of the Palatinate, Philippe's second wife (season 2–3)
- Pip Torrens as the Duke de Cassel (seasons 1–2)
- Harry Hadden-Paton as Gaston de Foix (season 2)
- Greta Scacchi as Madeleine de Foix (season 2)
- Steve Cumyn as Jean-Baptiste Colbert, Minister of Finance
- Joe Sheridan as François-Michel le Tellier, Marquis de Louvois
- Geoffrey Bateman as Jacques-Bénigne Bossuet

=== Recurring ===
- Lizzie Brocheré as Claudine Masson, midwife who becomes the king's physician (seasons 1-2)
- Gilly Gilchrist as Jacques (seasons 1-2)
- Dominique Blanc as Anne of Austria (season 1)
- Ken Bones as Cardinal Leto (season 3)
- Anatole Taubman as Montcourt (season 1)
- Alexis Michalik as Louis, Chevalier de Rohan (seasons 1-2)
- George Webster as William of Orange (seasons 1-2)
- Mark Rendall as Thomas Beaumont (season 2)
- Ned Dennehy as Father Étienne (season 2)
- James Joint as Father Pascal (season 2)
- Matthew McNulty as Guillaume, a shoemaker who serves in the army under Philippe (season 3)
- Jenny Platt as Jeanne, Guillaume's sister (season 3)
- Daphné Patakia as Princess Eleanor of Austria (season 3)

=== Minor characters ===
- Thierry Harcourt as André Le Nôtre
- Phareelle Onoyan as Isabelle, Colbert's niece (season 2)
- the Duke of Luxembourg (season 2)
- Aniaba, season 1; an African prince (season 1)
- Louise Marie-Thérèse (The Black Nun of Moret), an illegitimate infant of the Queen Marie-Thérèse begotten with prince Aniaba (or a court jester, they get both accused).

== Production ==
Versailles was created by British writers Simon Mirren and David Wolstencroft, both of whom were previously based in Hollywood. It is the most expensive French television series of all time, with a budget of €30 million (approximately $33 million) for its first season.

A second season was ordered prior to the season one premiere. Filming for the second season began in February 2016; its story took place four years after the beginning of the first season.

On 14 September 2016, producer Claude Chelli confirmed that Versailles had been renewed for a third season, which would begin filming in April 2017. On 11 May 2017, the official Instagram account of Château de Vaux-le-Vicomte published pictures of the ongoing shoot of the third season. On 17 April 2018, Variety reported that the third season of Versailles would be its last.

=== Filming locations ===
In addition to the Palace of Versailles, many other palaces and chateaux were filmed for the depiction of the unfinished Versailles, including the Vaux-le-Vicomte for a wide variety of interior and ballroom scenes, the Château de Champs-sur-Marne for its gardens and exteriors, and the Château de Sceaux for initial construction scenes. The show also featured a ballroom scene in season 1 filmed at the Château de Maisons-Laffitte and more scenes in the Grand Salle des Preuses at the Château de Pierrefonds. Other locations including the Château of Lésigny, Château de Janvry, Château de Vigny and the commune of Rambouillet.

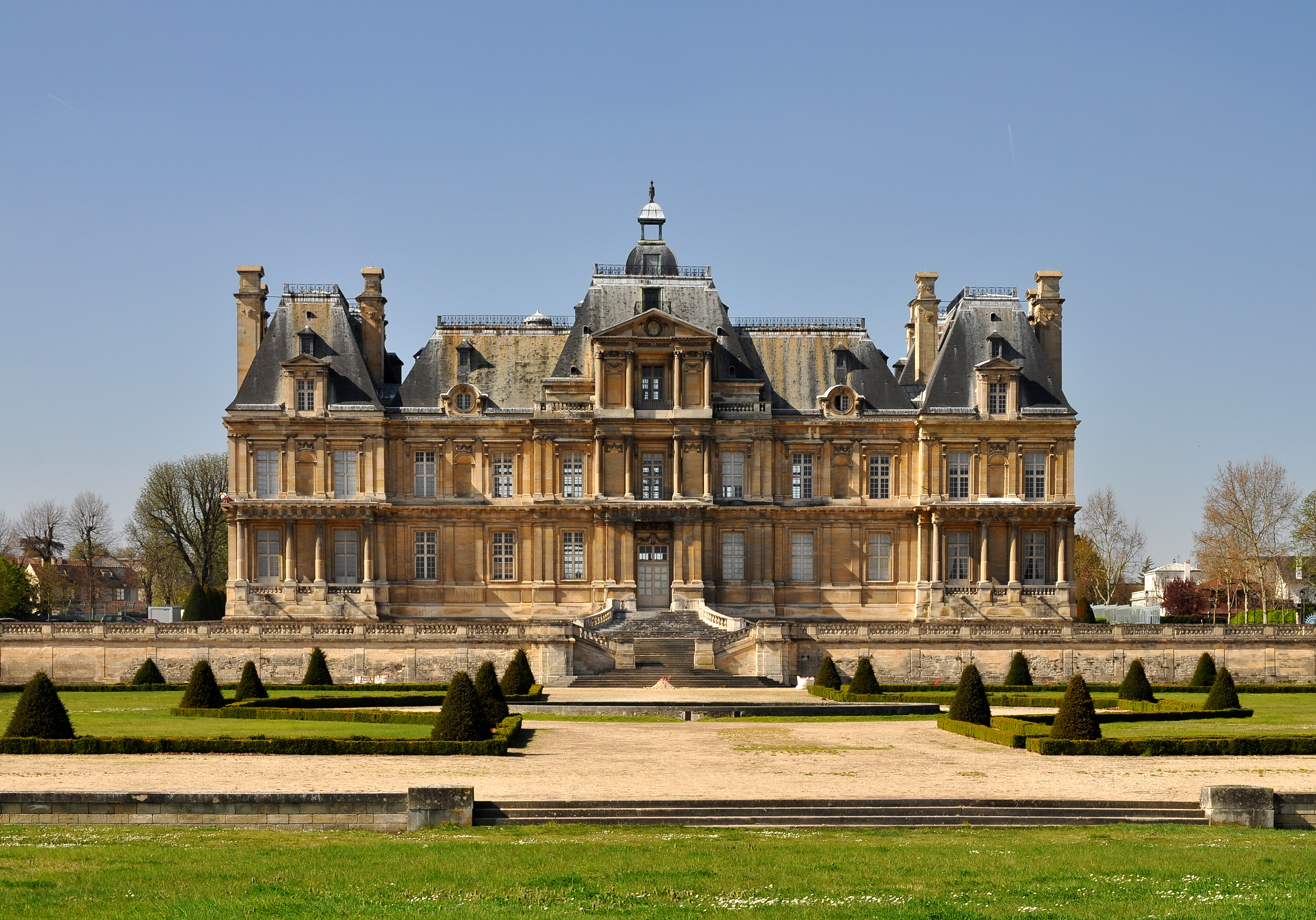
Château de Maisons-Laffitte

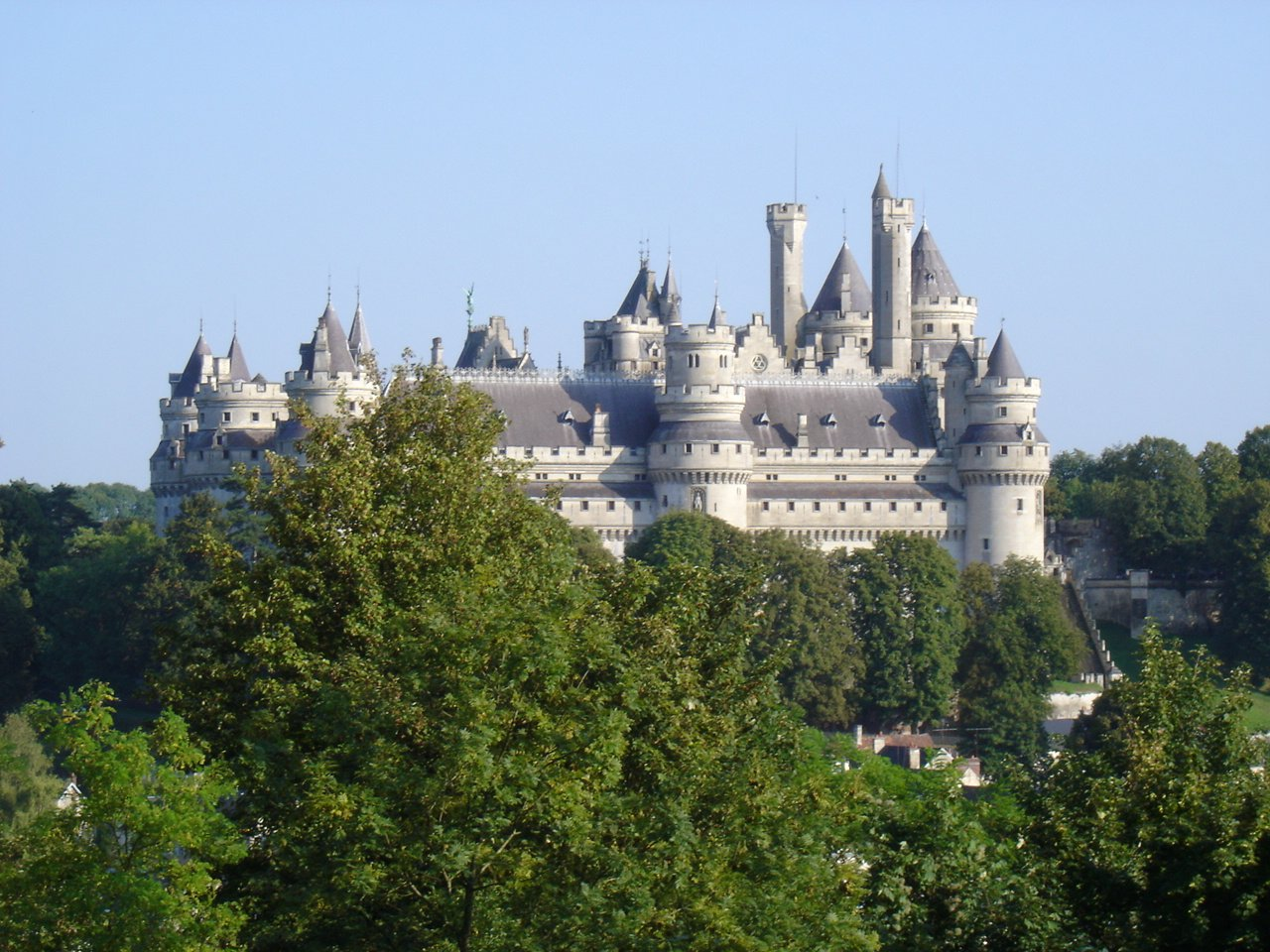
Château de Pierrefonds

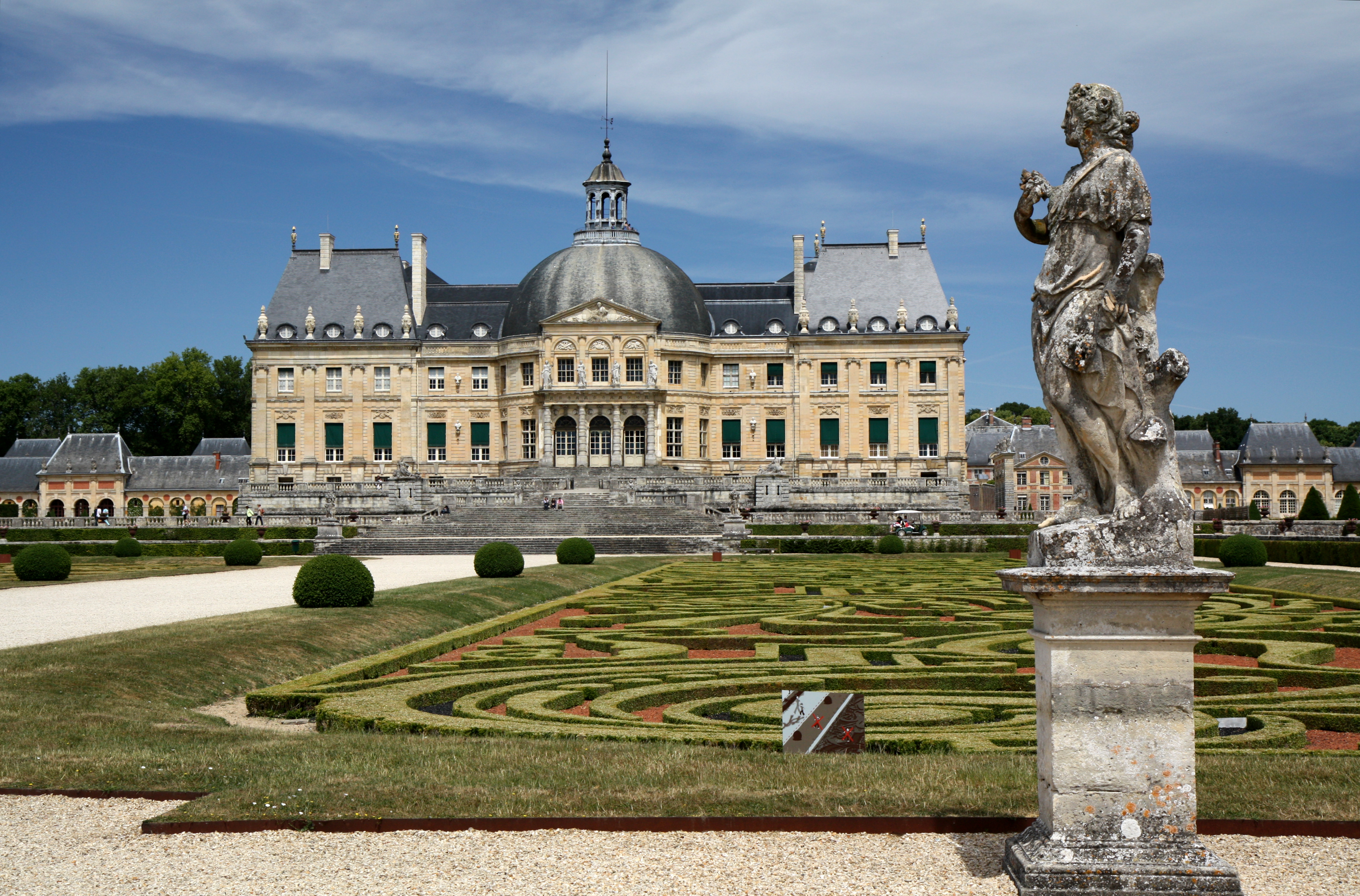
Vaux-le-Vicomte

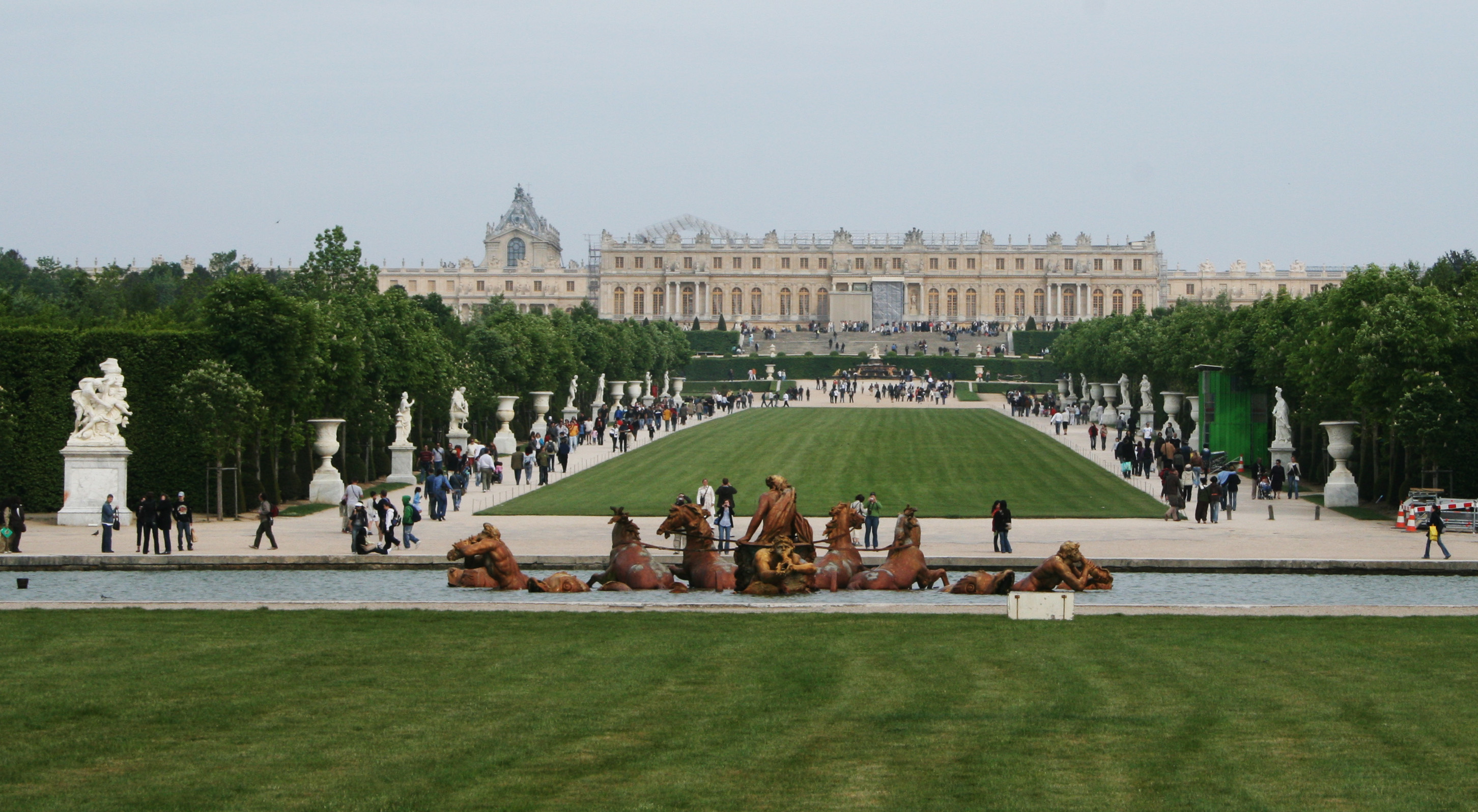
Modern Palace of Versailles, 2007

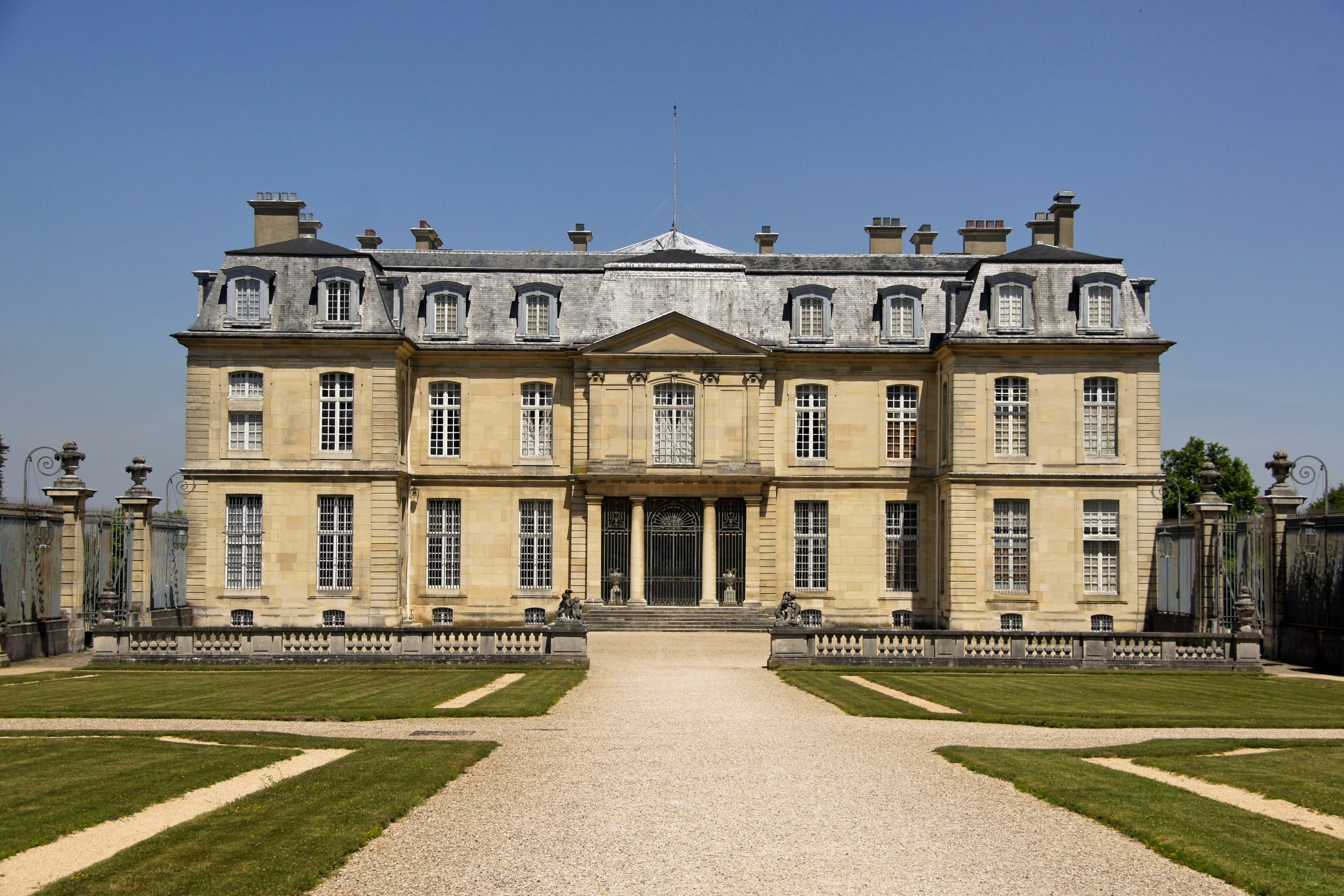
Château de Champs-sur-Marne

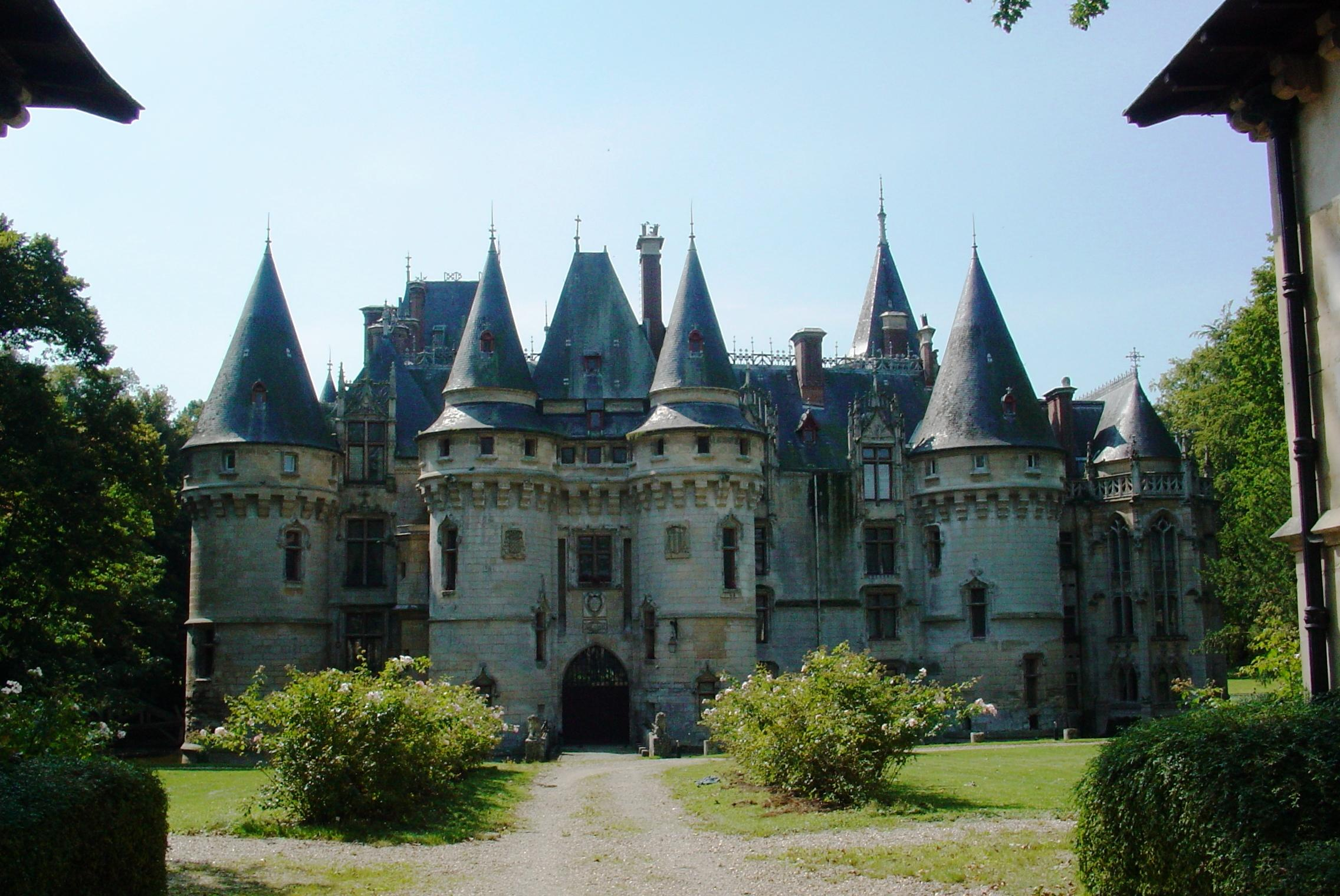
Château de Vigny

== Episodes ==
=== Series overview ===
Season	Episodes	Originally aired	
Season	Episodes	First aired	Last aired
1	10	16 November 2015	14 December 2015
2	10	27 March 2017	24 April 2017
3	10	23 April 2018	21 May 2018

=== Season 1 (2015) ===
No. overall	No. in season	Title	Directed by	Written by	Original release date
1	1	"Un roi sans château n'a rien d'un vrai roi" "Welcome to Versailles"	Jalil Lespert	Story by : Simon Mirren & David Wolstencroft and Andre Jacquemetton & Maria Jacquemetton; Teleplay by : Simon Mirren & David Wolstencroft	16 November 2015
Louis XIV has been the King of France since he was four years old. However, his mother Anne of Austria and a council of ministers were in charge. In 1666, his mother passes away when he is 27 years old. He begins construction of the Palace of Versailles in earnest. Many aristocratic ladies such as Louise de La Vallière in the royal court are lovers of Louis XIV.
2	2	"L'État c'est moi" "I Am the State"	Jalil Lespert	Simon Mirren & David Wolstencroft	16 November 2015
Louis XIV is upset that his Queen Maria Theresa of Spain has given birth to a Moorish child.
3	3	"Il est temps que la noblesse réplique" "Mirror for Princes"	Christoph Schrewe	Simon Mirren & David Wolstencroft	23 November 2015
Most of the nobles dislike Versailles. Nonetheless, Louis XIV has completed his move to Versailles. Colbert is serving as his first minister.
4	4	"Demain j'aurai bien plus de choses en commun avec mon ennemi qu'avec mon propre frère" "The Road"	Christoph Schrewe	Simon Mirren & David Wolstencroft	23 November 2015
Louis XIV regularly sleeps with his sister-in-law Henrietta of England.
5	5	"La guerre fait toujours rage en toi, dis-lui "Halte"" "Bow to Your King"	Christoph Schrewe	Sasha Hails	30 November 2015
On his brother Louis's order, in 1668, Philippe I, Duke of Orléans has returned from the War of Devolution against the Spanish Netherlands. France and Spanish Netherlands before the War of Devolution Duke de Cassel refuses to prove that he is of noble lineage; in turn, Louis XIV burns down Cassel's chateau with a ploy.
6	6	"Ce n'est pas un enfant que tu lui donnes, c'est un bâton avec lequel il nous frappera" "Invalides"	Thomas Vincent	Story by : Sasha Hails; Teleplay by : Andrew Bampfield	30 November 2015
The construction of the Versailles Palace seems like a never-ending project. Louis XIV is using soldiers—some of whom have become invalids in wars and construction accidents—to complete the construction. To assuage the frustration of the soldier builders of Versailles, Louis meets with them and proposes the construction of Les Invalides which will include a hospital, retirement home for soldier builders, refectories, and other facilities. He promises to provide free housing there for all wounded soldiers for the rest of their lives. Philippe I, Duke of Orléans urges his wife Henrietta of England to leave Versailles for Château de Saint-Cloud.
7	7	"La maladie du Roi empire, c'est maintenant qu'il faut agir" "Revelations"	Thomas Vincent	Story by : Sasha Hails; Teleplay by : Simon Mirren & David Wolstencroft	7 December 2015
Philippe, Chevalier de Lorraine is imprisoned for treason against Louis XIV.
8	8	"Ton palais de rêve est en train de devenir un paradis du complot" "Diplomacy"	Daniel Roby	Andrew Bampfield	7 December 2015
The House of Orange is in the ascendency in Holland. So, Louis XIV dispatches his cousin and sister-in-law Henrietta of England on a diplomatic mission to forge an alliance with her brother Charles II of England.
9	9	"Des forces beaucoup plus puissantes et déterminées continuent de chercher à nous détruire" "Etiquette"	Daniel Roby	Andrew Bampfield	14 December 2015
In Dover in 1670, Henrietta meets with her brother Charles II where she successfully negotiates the Secret Treaty of Dover. Louis wants his brother Philippe I, Duke of Orléans, to take charge of overseeing court etiquette at Versailles. Later, when William of Orange (who at the time was the Dutch monarch but not yet the British monarch) confronts Charles II about the latter's alliance with France against Holland, Charles II proposes a marriage between his niece Mary II and William of Orange to allay Holland's fears. Louis XIV begins to train his eldest son Louis, Grand Dauphin with the help of the Rohan.
10	10	"Laissez-moi sentir le soleil sur ma peau" "Bring the Garden Here"	Daniel Roby	Simon Mirren & David Wolstencroft	14 December 2015
After inferring that Montcourt has poisoned Henrietta, Louis XIV and Fabian Marchal confront Montcourt.

=== Season 2 (2017) ===
No. overall	No. in season	Title	Directed by	Written by	Original release date
11	1	"Labyrinthe" "The Labyrinth"	Thomas Vincent	Story by : Simon Mirren & David Wolstencroft; Teleplay by : David Wolstencroft	27 March 2017
Madame de Montespan has secured her position as the favorite of king Louis XIV. Meanwhile, Chevalier de Lorraine, who is the lover of the king's brother Philippe I, Duke of Orléans, remains in exile. Louis XIV suspects William of Orange to be the mastermind behind the Affair of the Poisons. Louis XIV appoints Duke de Cassel as his new minister of justice.
12	2	"Un murmure doux et léger" "A Still Small Voice"	Thomas Vincent	Story by : Simon Mirren & David Wolstencroft; Teleplay by : David Wolstencroft	27 March 2017
Louis XIV embarks on a war against the Protestant Dutch Republic of Holland in the Franco-Dutch War. Louis XIV wants his brother Philippe I, Duke of Orléans to marry the princess of Palatinate to fortify his alliance against the Dutch now that Philippe's first wife Henrietta has passed away. It is publicly known that Montespan is pregnant with Louis XIV's child which vexes his wife Queen Maria Theresa and the Catholic clergy such as Bishop Bossuet.
13	3	"Quis Custodiet Ipsos Custodes?" "Who Will Guard the Guards Themselves?"	Thomas Vincent	Andrew Bampfield	3 April 2017
Sophie de Clermont acquiesces to Louis XIV's wish that she marries his justice minister Duke de Cassel. With Louis XIV's assent, Madame Scarron becomes the governess of Montespan's children.
14	4	"Miasme" "Miasma"	Thomas Vincent	Andrew Bampfield	3 April 2017
Johan de Witt is the leader of government of the Dutch Republic under the stadtholder William of Orange.
15	5	"Guerre et paix" "War and Peace"	Mike Barker	Andrew Bampfield & David Wolstencroft	10 April 2017
Father Pascal is assassinated with a poisonous flower. Marie-Thérèse is appointed as regent when Louis XIV goes to war in Holland.
16	6	"Les Sables du temps" "The Sands of Time"	Mike Barker	Story by : Andrew Bampfield & David Wolstencroft; Teleplay by : Tim Loane	10 April 2017
The sultan of the Sultanate of Bijapur refuses to engage in political negotiations with the Queen acting as regent because she is a woman.
17	7	"Une nuit" "A Night"	Mike Barker	Andrew Bampfield	17 April 2017
Louis parleys with William of Orange. Isabelle, a new arrival at Versailles, is plunged into the depravity of Versailles life. The Queen, as regent, tries to establish rule of moral and religion.
18	8	"Le nouveau régime" "The New Regime"	Louis Choquette	Story by : Andrew Bampfield & David Wolstencroft and Tim Loane; Teleplay by : Andrew Bampfield	17 April 2017
Upon his return from war, Louis rejects his former lover. She takes desperate measures.
19	9	"Sept Ombres" "Seven Shadows"	Louis Choquette	Story by : Andrew Bampfield & David Wolstencroft and Tim Loane; Teleplay by : Tim Loane	24 April 2017
In 1674, Turenne ravages Palatinate. The state of Palatinate of the Holy Roman Empire joins the William of Orange in the war against France in the wake of an atrocity committed by French soldiers. Fabien Marchal arrests occultist priest Étienne Guibourg.
20	10	"De pierres et de sang" "Of Blood and Stone"	Louis Choquette	Andrew Bampfield & Tim Loane	24 April 2017
Louis XIV orders the arrest of the Duke of Luxembourg after questioning him in Versailles. The witch at the center of the poison intrigues of the palace is burned in front of a crowd. Her written record of her customers has consequences.

=== Season 3 (2018) ===
The third season was released on demand in its entirety on 23 April 2018.

No. overall	No. in season	Title	Directed by	Written by	Original release date
21	1	"Miroirs et fumée" "Smoke and Mirrors"	Richard Clark	Story by : Andrew Bampfield & Tim Loane; Teleplay by : Tim Loane	23 April 2018
Leopold I, Holy Roman Emperor meets with Louis XIV to concede defeat in the Nine Years' War at the Palace of Versailles . Philippe I, Duke of Orléans returns from war and meets his baby son for the first time. Meanwhile vicious gossip starts to spread through the palace. Bontemps reminds the French King that following The Fronde, the French Protestants maintained their allegiance to Louis XIV by fighting against William of Orange. Louis XIV accepts the counsel of his brother, Philippe I, Duke of Orléans, that convicted criminals should be used for military recruitment instead of sending veterans of the Nine Years' War back to war in North America. The Queen spends time with her former brother in law.
22	2	"Question de confiance" "Question of Trust"	Richard Clark	Story by : Andrew Bampfield & Tim Loane; Teleplay by : Andrew Bampfield	23 April 2018
Philippe I, Duke of Orléans, seems to have suffered a concussion at the hands of the Man in the Iron Mask and begins to investigate his identity. Sophie returns from Holland with news. In negotiations with Leopold I, Holy Roman Emperor, Louis XIV pushes to claim all of Spain once Charles II of Spain (also the half-brother of Louis XIV's wife Maria Theresa of Spain) passes away. Louis XIV defends Françoise d'Aubigné, Marquise de Maintenon against rumors that she was a professional prostitute in a brothel; he admonishes the court and dismisses a former favourite. The Princess Palatine suffers a loss. The people of France start to resent the high taxes the King levies in the face of their poverty.
23	3	"La vérité éclatera" "The Truth Will Burst"	Richard Clark	Story by : Andrew Bampfield & Tim Loane; Teleplay by : Martha Hillier	30 April 2018
Louis XIV gives leave to his Hapsburg wife Maria Theresa of Spain to go to Madrid, Spain, to visit her ailing brother, the King of Spain. Louis enacts a violent revenge against his subjects. Louis learns that the rumours he had punished the court for spreading were, in fact, true. He dismisses another former favourite.
24	4	"Crime et châtiment" "Crime and Punishment"	Richard Clark	Story by : Andrew Bampfield & Tim Loane; Teleplay by : Steve Bailie	30 April 2018
Maria Theresa of Spain denies to her husband that she and Louis XIV's cousin, Leopold I, Holy Roman Emperor, were headed to Spain to arrange the marriage of Eleanor of Austria to Charles II of Spain. Philippe continues to investigate the Man in the Iron Mask. An impulsive Louis has a visiting scientist arrested and orders the public execution of a prisoner to make a brutal argument against rebellion. The King asks Françoise d'Aubigné, Marquise de Maintenon to come back to Versaiiles.
25	5	"L'au-delà" "The Afterlife"	Edward Bazalgette	Story by : Andrew Bampfield & Tim Loane; Teleplay by : Tim Loane	7 May 2018
An emissary of Mehmed IV meets with Louis XIV to seek the support of France against Leopold I, Holy Roman Emperor in the upcoming Battle of Vienna (1683) as Louis continues to try and gain territory in Spain. Louis embarks on a campaign against Protestants. Philippe I, Duke of Orléans becomes preoccupied with an inscription on a dagger based on the Vulgate Wisdom of Solomon which is a clue to the identity of the Man in the Iron Mask. Maria Theresa of Spain dies following an exorcism.
26	6	"La roue de la fortune" "The Wheel of Fortune"	Edward Bazalgette	Story by : Andrew Bampfield & Tim Loane; Teleplay by : Andrew Bampfield	7 May 2018
Following the death of his wife Maria Theresa of Spain, Louis XIV is concerned that his claim of dominion over the Catholic kingdom of Spain has grown tenuous. Contrary to the advice of his First Minister Jean-Baptiste Colbert, Louis XIV discusses abandoning the 1598 Edict of Nantes (Edict of Fontainebleau, 1685) to win over the moral support of Pope Innocent XI; this way, Louis XIV can emerge as the champion of the Catholic faith in France as well as Spain. In order to re-establish his blood connection to the Kingdom of Spain, Louis XIV is keen on matching his niece Marie Louise d'Orléans to Charles II of Spain; her step-mother Princess Palatine is supportive of this union. Philippe I, Duke of Orléans along with Fabien Marchal, the king's chief of police, infer that the Man in the Iron Mask is the illegitimate son of Louis XIII and Louise de La Fayette.
27	7	"Le livre des révélations" "The Book of Revelations"	Edward Bazalgette	Story by : Andrew Bampfield & Tim Loane; Teleplay by : Martha Hillier	14 May 2018
The identity of the Man in the Iron Mask is revealed and a plot by the Vatican is revealed. Princess Eleanor of Austria flees Versailles with the help of Sophie.
28	8	"Des hommes et des dieux" "Men and Gods"	Peter Van Hees	Story by : Andrew Bampfield & Tim Loane; Teleplay by : Steve Bailie	14 May 2018
Cardinal Leto proposes that Louis XIV marry Isabel Luísa, Princess of Beira to "unite the entire Iberian Peninsula under his aegis.". Louis doubts his identity and destiny.
29	9	"La poudrière" "The Powder Keg"	Peter Van Hees	Story by : Andrew Bampfield & Tim Loane; Teleplay by : Tim Loane	21 May 2018
Louis XIV tells his brother that the only way to end the danger posed by the revelation of the Man in the Iron Mask is to end his life. Together, they present him with poisoned wine, which he drinks willingly. On orders from Louis XIV, Marquis de Louvois confiscates the property of French subjects who refuse to recant their Protestant faith. Philippe leaves for Saint-Cloud, angry at the direction his brother's reign is taking. The King meets with a potential wife.
30	10	"L'héritage" "The Legacy"	Peter Van Hees	Story by : Andrew Bampfield & Tim Loane; Teleplay by : Andrew Bampfield	21 May 2018
Louis XIV decides to meet the people by the tradition of the thaumaturgy. Philipe is persuaded by the Princess Palatine to return to Versailles. Lorraine is saved by Philippe and they both save Delphine who escapes to Holland. An assassination attempt by the Huguenots led by Bastien and Jeanne is made on Louis XIV but they fail. Bastien is shot by Philippe. Marchal is leaving but returns only to have Jeanne die in his arms and he is captured. His ultimate fate is unknown. Louvois takes over for Colbert who passes away.

== Broadcast ==
Versailles premiered on 16 November 2015 on Canal+ in France and on Super Channel in Canada, in May 2016 on BBC Two in Britain, and on 1 October 2016 on Ovation in the U.S. The Movie Network gave early access to all of season 2 in October 2016, prior to its 2017 broadcast dates. The series stayed on the English-language Super Channel until May 2016 but was gone by December 2016, after TMN had made season 2 available early. The French version of Super Channel is keeping the show available until 8 November 2020. City aired the first six episodes of season 1 from 4 January to 25 February.

The second season premiered on 27 March 2017 in France, and on 21 April 2017 in Britain. At some point after the first season concluded, Super Channel lost the Canadian broadcast rights to the series. Subsequently, The Movie Network picked up those rights and began airing reruns of the first season.

In April 2016, Netflix acquired the rights to stream Versailles. Netflix released the third and final season of Versailles on 2 April 2019.

== Reception ==
The first season of Versailles received mixed to positive reviews from critics. It holds a 55 out of 100 rating on Metacritic, based on six reviews, and an 80% rating on Rotten Tomatoes, with an average score of 6.56 out of 10, based on 10 reviews. Marjolaine Boutet of Le Monde gave the first season a mixed review, stating that its ambition was both its main flaw and what made it a quality television series, and added that the series' most fascinating character, Louis XIV's gardener Jacques (Gilly Gilchrist), did not have enough screen time.

The third season has an approval rating of 44% on Rotten Tomatoes based on nine reviews, with an average rating of 5.2 out of 10.
