= Louise Marie-Therese =

Louise Marie-Therese may refer to:

- Louise Marie-Therese (The Black Nun of Moret) (1664–1732)
- Princess Louise Marie Thérèse of France (1819–1864)
