= Sarah Winter =

British actress

- Born: London, England
- Education: Cambridge University
- Occupation: Actor

Sarah Winter is a British film and television actress. She is best known for starring in the Canal+ series Versailles.

== Life and career ==
Winter was born in London. Her interest in acting was fostered at an early age by her grandfather, who introduced her to the plays of Shakespeare and took her to performances at the Open Air Theatre at Regent's Park in London. She attended Cambridge University, where she was active in theatre. Her early professional performances drew praise.

Winter's professional film and series work includes many historical dramas, including Reign, and Versailles, as Louise de La Vallière, a prominent mistress of King Louis XIV of France. An early role was as Delia Derbyshire, who was responsible for the electronic realisation of the Doctor Who theme music in the biographical film An Adventure in Space and Time.

Winter appeared in animated form with Aidan Gillen in the film noir-like Science Channel documentary series Killers of the Cosmos in 2021 as "The Informant."

In the miniseries A Small Light, Winter played a nurse who assists in smuggling Jewish children out of Nazi-occupied Amsterdam. She has discussed her connection to this role, as her great-aunt was a nurse who helped children escape Amsterdam during the occupation.

Winter has done audio and voiceover work as well, including work on the Nintendo game Another Eden and the narration of the Audible audiobook for Party Girls Die in Pearls.

Winter has professional dance training and choreographed the upcoming Jaclyn Bethany film Tell That to the Winter Sea.

== Personal life ==
Winter has a cat named George Bailey, after the protagonist of It's a Wonderful Life.
