= Vigny, Val-d'Oise =

Vigny
- Commune
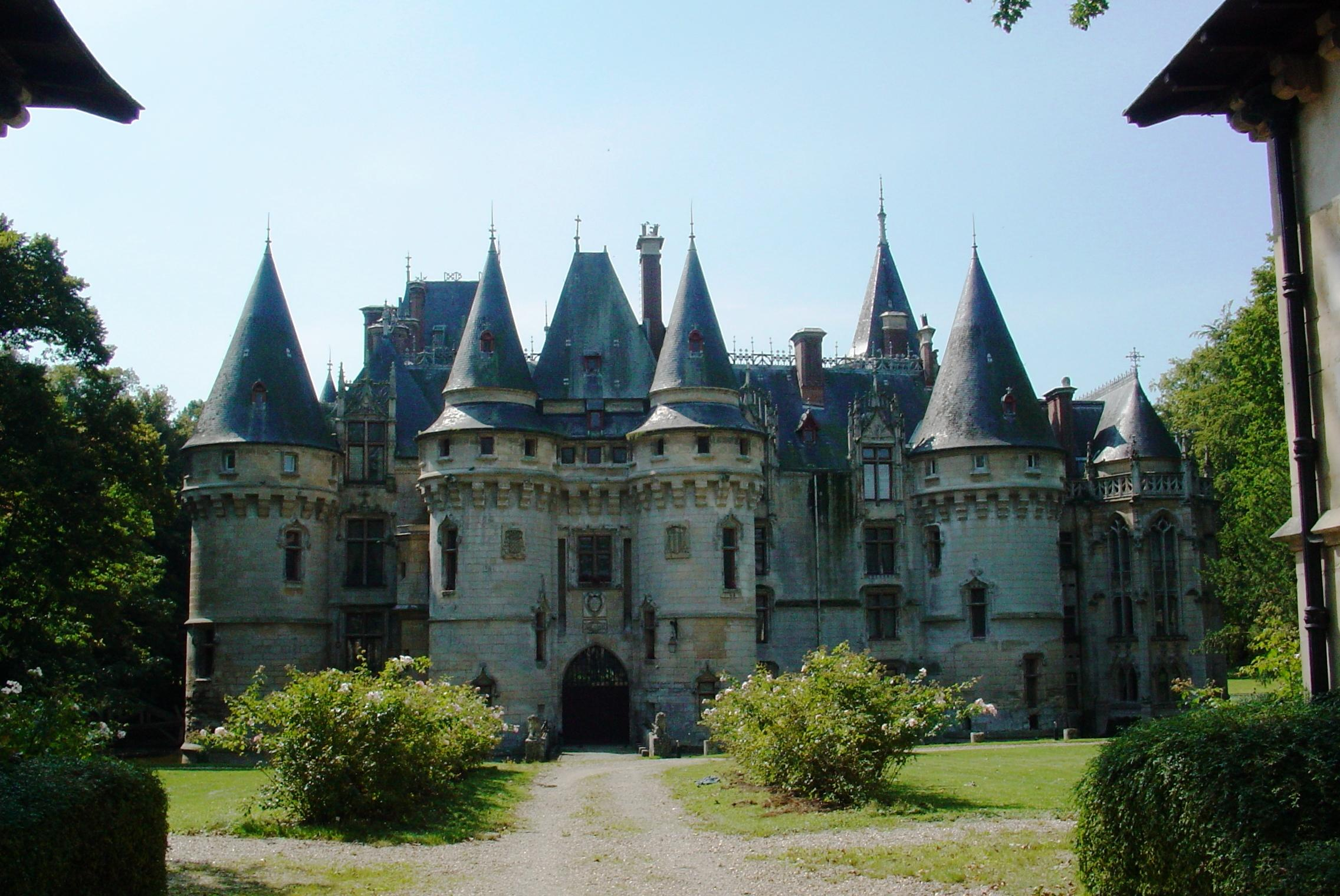
- Château de Vigny

- Coat of arms
- Location of Vigny
- Location within France Location within Île-de-France (region)
- Coordinates: 49°04′41″N 1°55′45″E
- Country: France
- Region: Île-de-France
- Department: Val-d'Oise
- Arrondissement: Pontoise
- Canton: Vauréal
- Intercommunality: CC Vexin Centre

Government
  - Mayor (2020–2026): Robert de Kerveguen
- Area^{1}: 6.56 km^{2} (2.53 sq mi)
- Highest elevation: 134 m (440 ft)
- Lowest elevation: 58 m (190 ft)
- Population (2023): 1,137
  - Density: 173/km^{2} (449/sq mi)
- Time zone: UTC+01:00 (CET)
  - Summer (DST): UTC+02:00 (CEST)
- INSEE/Postal code: 95658 /95450
- ^{1} French Land Register data, which excludes lakes, ponds, glaciers > 1 km^{2} (0.386 sq mi or 247 acres) and river estuaries.

Vigny (French pronunciation: [viɲi]) is a commune in the Val-d'Oise department in Île-de-France in northern France.

R&B singer Rihanna shot her music video for "Te Amo" at the château de Vigny in 2010.

Season 6 Episode 7 of Highlander: The Series, "The Unusual Suspects" was shot here, with the Vigny being the setting for the home of Immortal, Hugh Fitzcairn.

The botanist Sébastien Vaillant (1669–1722) was born in Vigny.

== See also ==
- Communes of the Val-d'Oise department
