= Black Box (TV series) =

American psychological medical drama television series

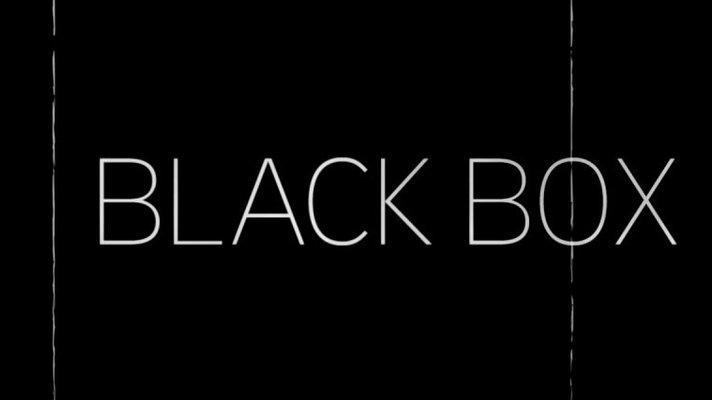
- Genre: Medical drama
- Created by: Amy Holden Jones
- Starring: Kelly Reilly: Ditch Davey; David Ajala; Ali Wong; Laura Fraser; David Chisum; Siobhan Williams; Terry Kinney; Vanessa Redgrave
- Country of origin: United States
- Original language: English
- No. of seasons: 1
- No. of episodes: 13

Production
- Executive producers: Amy Holden Jones; Ilene Chaiken; Bryan Singer; Oly Obst; Anne Thomopoulos
- Running time: 43 minutes
- Production companies: Bold Films; Little Chicken Productions; Bad Hat Harry Productions

Original release
- Network: ABC
- Release: April 24 – July 24, 2014

Black Box is an American psychological medical drama television series which ran for one season on ABC from April 24 to July 24, 2014, and stars Kelly Reilly and Vanessa Redgrave. The program had a straight-to-series order with a 13-episode commitment. The series was created by Amy Holden Jones and co-produced by Ilene Chaiken, Bryan Singer, Oliver Obst, and Anne Thomopoulos. After one season, ABC canceled Black Box on August 7, 2014.

== Plot ==
Dr. Catherine Black is a neurologist who secretly has bipolar disorder. The only person who knows is her psychiatrist, Dr. Helen Hartramph, who has been with Catherine since her first break and has been a maternal figure for Catherine since her mother, who also had bipolar disorder, committed suicide.

== Cast and characters ==
=== Main cast ===
- Kelly Reilly as Dr. Catherine Black, a famed neurologist who secretly has bipolar disorder.
- Ditch Davey as Dr. Ian Bickman, Chief of Neurosurgery
- David Ajala as Will Van Renseller, chef and Catherine's boyfriend
- Ali Wong as Dr. Lina Lark, Radiology
- Laura Fraser as Regan Black, Josh's wife
- David Chisum as Josh Black, Catherine's older brother
- Siobhan Williams as Esme Black, Catherine's niece who is actually her own biological daughter
- Terry Kinney as Dr. Owen Morley, chief of staff and department chairman of The Cube and Catherine's former teacher and mentor.
- Vanessa Redgrave as Dr. Helen Hartramph, Catherine's psychiatrist.

=== Recurring cast ===
- Tasso Feldman as Leo Robinson
- Alex Hernandez as Manuel
- David Rasche as Hunter Black
- Rachel Brosnahan as Delilah
- Olivia Birkelund as Karina Black
- Audrey Esparza as Carlotta
- Aja Naomi King as Ali Henslee
- Edward Herrmann as Dr. Reynaud
- Sepideh Moafi as Dr. Farrah Mahmoud

== Episodes ==
No.	Title	Directed by	Written by	Original release date	U.S. viewers (millions)
1	"Kiss the Sky"	Simon Curtis	Amy Holden Jones	April 24, 2014	6.87
Dr. Catherine Black has a meeting with her psychiatrist, Dr. Helen Hartramph, in which she tells the doctor that she briefly went off her meds and made plans to commit suicide. Her boyfriend, Will Renseller, had proposed marriage to her but she did not answer because he does not know about her bipolar disorder. Catherine works at the Neuroscience Research and Treatment Center aka "The Cube." She meets a patient named Anthony who a few months ago showed symptoms of schizophrenia. She then meets the new Chief of Neurosurgery, Dr. Ian Bickman, who is known for being a playboy. Catherine accepts Will's proposal when she tells him her secret but goes off her meds after he shows her a house they might live in as a family. She tells Will she does not want children but says they can make it work. While still off her meds, she catches Ian taking Modafinil, which enables him to focus; soon after this, she makes out with him. Catherine then meets with Will and makes passionate love. On the same night, just before she leaves, she throws him the engagement ring. The medical team at The Cube discovers that Anthony has a brain tumor. Ian operates on him and Anthony returns to normal. Anthony tells Catherine he no longer wants to be a physicist but go into neuroscience instead. Catherine later visits her brother Josh, his wife Regan, and their daughter Esme. She cares about Esme very dearly and asks her to be her Maid of Honor. In a flashback, Catherine's mother is seen committing suicide by drowning herself in the ocean. Once Catherine is on her meds again, she goes to see Esme, but Regan tells her that she needs to take a break from them. It is revealed that Esme is Catherine's biological daughter. Catherine then goes to a beach similar to where her mother died. She calls Helen to ask her for reason to go on living. Helen says that her work is the reason to keep on living. Will meets with Catherine, and he says that he will stay and be with her because he likes who Catherine is when she is off her meds.
2	"Sweet Little Lies"	Simon Curtis	Amy Holden Jones	May 1, 2014	5.60
Catherine treats a patient named Carrie, the baby-sitter of a hyperactive child. The doctors diagnose her with exploding head syndrome. With the help of her intern Leo, who has an outstanding memory and pointed out that this happens when the nanny is asleep, Catherine diagnoses narcolepsy. Meanwhile, Ian bursts into Catherine's office to kiss her but she does not reciprocate. He finds that she is hiding a spliff in her hands. Owen tells the staff members that Dr. Raynaud at a different hospital had a seizure while operating on a patient. He lets everyone know to not hide any illnesses or they will be fired. Dr. Raynaud tries to commit suicide but Catherine is able to save him at the last minute. Catherine is still banned from seeing Esme, and is not allowed to attend her piano recital. Josh calls Catherine on her phone without speaking and transmits Esme's piano playing to her.
3	"Who Are You"	John Krokidas	Ilene Chaiken	May 8, 2014	4.64
Will is upset that Catherine has cheated on him, but then turns it around and said he cheated with his hostess, Delilah. Delilah tells Catherine that she had repeated sex with Will. This leads to a messy argument with Catherine telling her to stay away. Ian had saved a pregnant and famous opera singer, who has a brain bleed. He has an argument with Dr. Pratt, the head of obstetrics, who wants to save the baby. He storms out and in that moment, Ian has to perform a caesarean section save both the mother and the baby. Meanwhile, Lina is using a psychopathy checklist on Ian. Catherine is treating a patient name Mona, who has a different visual perception on her left side. Catherine believes she might have tuberculosis and when Mona takes the turn for the worse, they do not know how to treat her without confirming that she truly does have it. They operate her on it anyway and it turns out she does have it and she is saved. Another patient, Anna, who has lesbian bed death, cannot recognize her wife, Claire. She is diagnosed with Capgras delusion, for which there is no cure. The intern Ali solves the problem, which Catherine deems as a rare skill. Regan allows Catherine to see Esme again, and wants to make sure that Esme knows Regan is her only mother. Esme is doing a student film on her family and wants Catherine to be part of it. While viewing the video, Regan realizes that same nervous habit that Esme is displaying is the same as Catherine.
4	"Exceptional or Dead"	John Krokidas	Ish Goldstein & Matthew Robinson	May 15, 2014	4.31
The engagement is on; Will's staff at the restaurant is throwing the engagement party. Will tells Delilah that it was only a one-night stand and it will never happen again. Owen is playing chess and encounters an odd of sort man, Mike, who thinks he is the next Bobby Fischer. Dr. Farrah Mahmoud, the psychiatrist at the hospital diagnosed him as bipolar and gives him meds. The meds puts him in a rage and Mike takes Farrah at knifepoint. Catherine calms him down and finds out that there is something wrong with his brain. The interns, Ali and Leo are doing a simulation that Ali fails. She wonders if this is the right place for her, because Leo is always on top of things due to his terrific memory. Ali asks Leo questions about the Space Shuttle Challenger disaster which are true but it happened before he was born. They find out that Leo has a brain tumor. Leo thinks he is Ian and goes into Mike's operating room. Luckily, the real Ian stops him before he can do anything. Ian then operates on Leo. A complication arises, but he is able to control the bleeding and Leo is saved. Catherine, while watching Ian perform the surgery, realizes that he is truly a remarkable person. Catherine loses her engagement ring down the drain, and has Josh help her. Josh brings in his plumber friend, who finds the ring, and Lina and he celebrate with a kiss. At the engagement party, Delilah is outside and is clearly upset as she watches Will and Catherine dance.
5	"Jerusalem"	Eric Stoltz	Oahn Ly	May 22, 2014	3.79
Jacob, a board member of The Cube, is admitted by his wife after giving away $12 million and gifting the family penthouse to their maid. Through conventional means, it is determined that he has Jerusalem syndrome: a centuries old condition in which the patient is suddenly, compulsively religious. Meanwhile, Dr. Reynaud is doing fine after brain surgery and is looking forward to a year with his grandson before passing away. Dr. Morely, even informs him that an experimental drug may gain him up to two years. But shortly after, Reynaud has an episode, leading to a diagnosis of a few days. Catherine helps Esme impress a boy at her school, and they end up going back to Esme's house to smoke marijuana. Meanwhile, Catherine gets an experimental hallucinogenic mushroom (similar to shrooms) from a colleague that may help Reynaud come to terms with his prognosis. This is successful, and Reynaud passes away peacefully. Joshua catches Esme and calls Catherine to help. Mistaking the powder for cinnamon, Will accidentally puts some of Catherine's leftover experimental shrooms into some of his and Catherine's coffee, which they both drink before Catherine leaves. Catherine attempts to explain things to Esme, but must run out when the shrooms start causing hallucinations. Will experiences similar hallucinations at the apartment. At The Cube, Jacob has a seizure, indicating that the Jerusalem syndrome diagnosis was wrong and he is having micro-strokes in his brain that need to be fixed; but if they are, 'God' will go away. Bickman does perform the procedure and Jacob is able to leave, back to his old self.
6	"Forget Me"	Eric Stoltz	Amy Holden Jones	May 29, 2014	3.81
Catherine and Joshua reflect on their past when their father returns. Meanwhile, a decorated soldier struggles with a war wound; a new patient is admitted to the Cube after falling off a mountain; and Will tries to get rid of Delilah.
7	"Kodachrome"	Bronwen Hughes	Ilene Chaiken	June 19, 2014	4.06
Dr. Bickman and Dr. Black work to remove a bullet from a Pulitzer Prize-winning journalist without help from modern technology. Meanwhile, a high-profile makeup artist has a minor stroke leaving him color blind; and Catherine meets Will's parents.
8	"Free Will"	Bronwen Hughes	Gary Lennon	June 26, 2014	3.77
A new patient is referred to the Cube with headaches and hallucinations. Meanwhile, Catherine treats a patient with alien-hand syndrome and tries to work on her relationship with Will.
9	"Sing Like Me"	Tricia Brock	Amy Holden Jones	July 3, 2014	3.72
Dr. Black works on a music study which includes a patient who has developed a pitch problem, a man who has acquired savant syndrome, and a street musician. To help the street musician, Catherine turns to an unexpected source, her father, to talk him into surgery. Farrah wants to help with the study as she shows her opera singing talent by belting out an impromptu tune. Bickman makes a surprising proposal, telling her she can have both him and Will. During the street musician's surgery, the sound from the OR is patched through the Cube with the other patients joining in on the song. Esme asks Will for a job at the restaurant and also lets it slip that she and Catherine ran into Bickman outside the hotel listed on the pen he found.
10	"I Shall Be Released"	Tricia Brock	Ish Goldstein & Matthew Robinson	July 10, 2014	3.72
Dr. Morely and Farrah admit a patient who thinks he is dead. A mom fears her daughter has meningitis when it winds up being something much more serious. Farrah suspects something when Catherine goes off her meds to help her patient. Catherine revealed to Will that Esme is her daughter as Esme starts working at Will's restaurant. In her first shift, she learns about Will's night with Delilah and vows to give them cause to fire Delilah. She sabotages Delilah, giving them cause to fire her.
11	"Emotion"	Hayley Schore	Michael Madden	July 17, 2014	3.73
Bickman rushes a doorman into an alternative procedure. Catherine has to make a tough diagnosis. Her brother, Joshua, fears that he is enabling his sister as she breaks up with Will.
12	"The Fear"	Joshua Marston	Ilene Chaiken	July 24, 2014	3.93
Catherine experiences hallucinations, but refuses to be admitted to the hospital. Bickman is hesitant to operate again after a botched surgery.
13	"Consequences"	Andrew McCarthy	Amy Holden Jones	July 24, 2014	3.93
Catherine deals with the fallout from her condition. Some of her colleagues now know the truth and while her boss lets her keep her job, he is now watching what she does. After she was right with a patient, he took her off notice. Meanwhile, Esme's biological father needs a transplant so he wants to meet his daughter. The interns get their letters for where they can do their residencies. Ultimately the jealous nurse who wants Dr. Bickman for herself sabotages Catherine causing her boss to fire her by telling him about Catherine's drug use.

== Production ==
Writer Michael Madden was the winner of the 1st Annual Happy Writers Working Writers Contest from filmmaker networking website Stage 32. This led to him being hired as a writer on the series, for which he also served as a medical consultant. He had previously worked as the Clinical Director of the New York Hospital-Cornell Burn Center and the Director of Trauma at the Jamaica Hospital Medical Center, before turning to writing.

On December 3, 2013, outdoor scenes were filmed on the Columbia University campus. On March 31, 2014, scenes were filmed at Wave Hill in Riverdale, New York.

== Critical reception ==
Brian Lowry of Variety criticized the show's overly familiar premise, drawing comparison with producer Bryan Singer's earlier series House, but commended Reilly's performance and the music. Tim Goodman of The Hollywood Reporter slated the series as overly silly, criticizing the acting, writing and visual presentation. Jessica Johnson of Time Out felt the combination of psychological drama and medical procedural did not work, calling it a "a dull, preachy and redundant PSA on bipolar disorder."

Alessandra Stanley of The New York Times dubbed the series, "a well-intended mess of a show with preposterous medical emergencies and a few flickers of ingenuity."

== Home media ==
The first season is available on iTunes.

The Complete First Season was released on DVD and Blu-ray in Germany on December 4, 2014, by Concorde Video. The entire series is available for purchase on Amazon Instant Video in Germany.
