= Anne Thomopoulos =

Television producer

Anne Thomopoulos is a television producer and was senior vice president at HBO. She served as an executive producer for the series Rome (2005–2007) and miniseries Generation Kill (2008).

== Career ==
Anne Thomopoulos, a former senior vice president at HBO, began her career with the mandate to create a dramatic series department. She did so developing Oz (1997–2003), HBO's first one-hour drama series. Subsequently, she established the acclaimed miniseries division, developing and overseeing Emmy and Golden Globe winning From the Earth to the Moon (1998), The Corner (2000), and Band of Brothers (2001).

Thomopoulos also developed and executive produced HBO/BBC historical dramatic series Rome (2005–2007), the HBO miniseries Generation Kill (2008) and Camelot (2011) for Starz. Additional productions include the historical series Borgia (2011–2014) for Canal+, Black Box (2014) for ABC and Versailles (2015–2018) for Canal+.

== Personal life ==
Thomopoulos is a dual national of the United States and France who lives in Madrid.
