= Château de Vigny =

Château in Île-de-France, France

Coordinates: 49°04′36″N 1°55′34″E

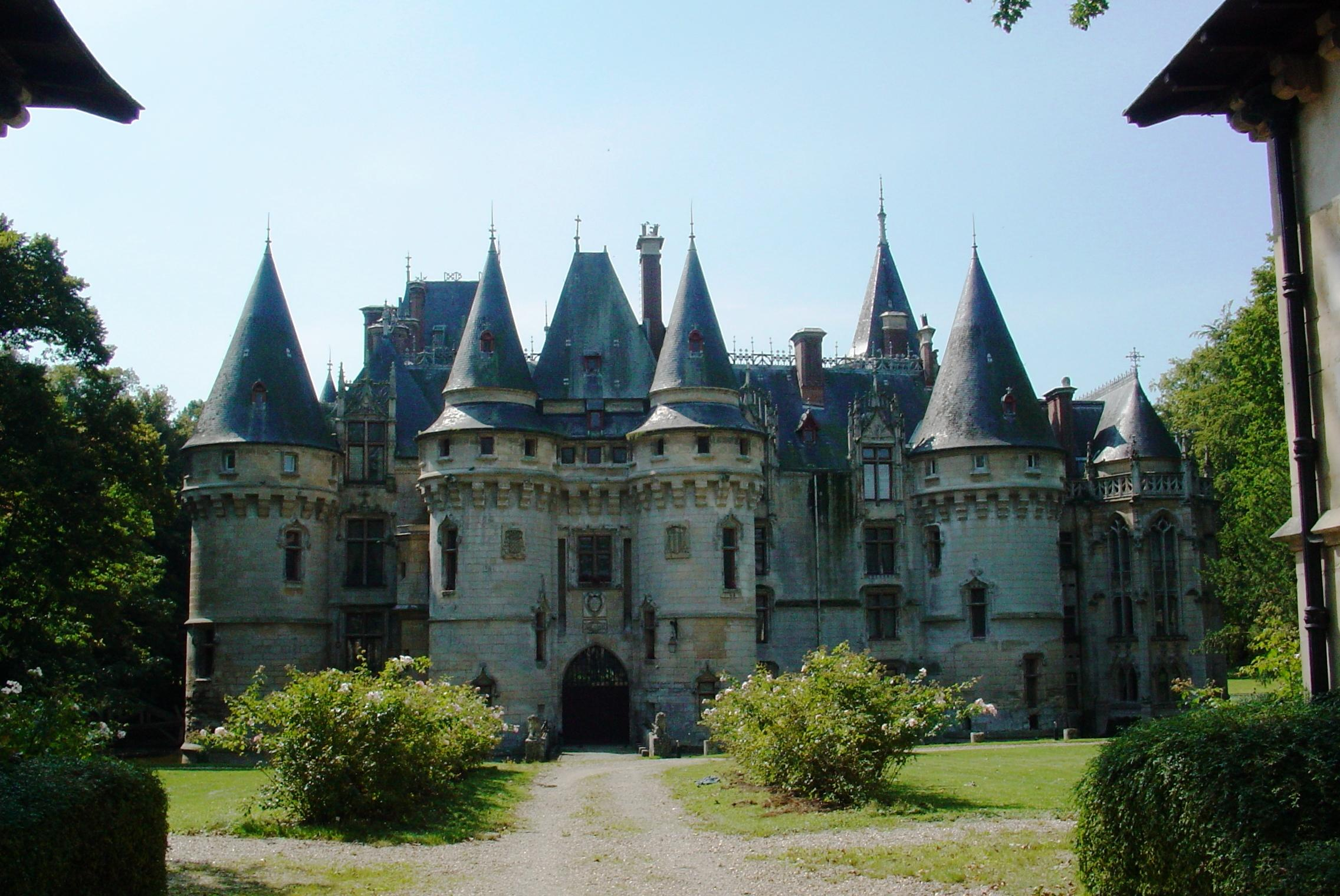
Principal façade, north side

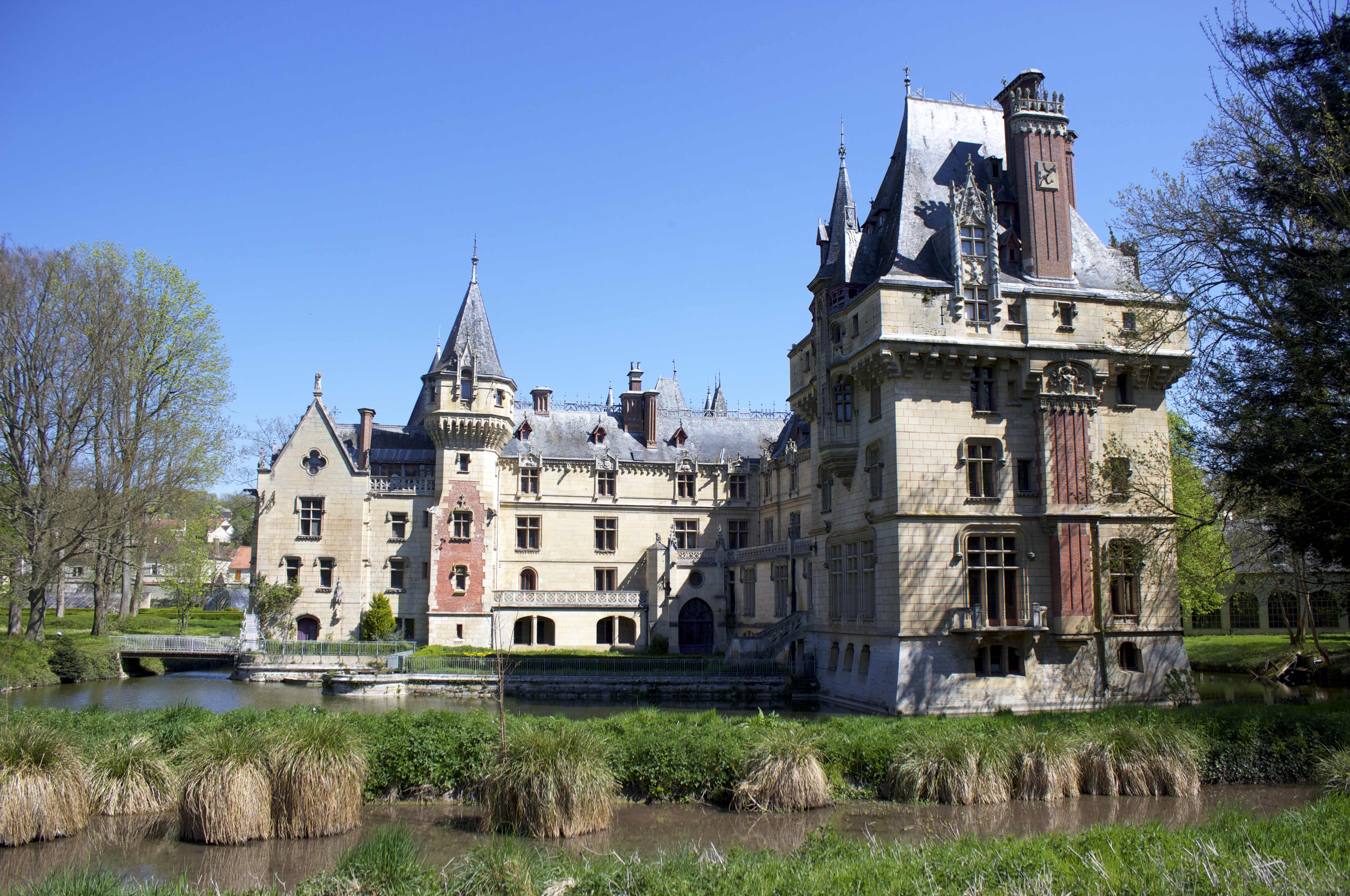
Rear façade

The Château de Vigny is a château in the commune of Vigny, Val d'Oise, France. It was built in 1504 on the site of a mediaeval structure for Cardinal Georges d'Amboise, with substantial alterations in the 1880s in the troubadour style for its then owner, Comte Philippe Vitali, Prince of Sant'Eusebio. It was listed ("inscrit") as a monument historique in 1984.
