= Louise Marie-Thérèse (The Black Nun of Moret) =

French Benedictine nun (1664–1732)

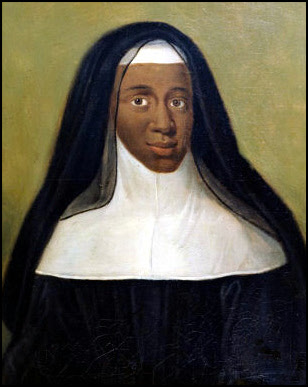
- Born: 1664
- Died: 1732 (aged 67–68); Moret-sur-Loing

Louise Marie Thérèse (1664–1732), known as the Black Nun of Moret, was a Benedictine nun rumoured to be of French royal descent.

It alleged that she was the daughter of Queen Marie-Thérèse, however, historians think she was most likely the illegitimate daughter of Marie-Thérèse's husband, King Louis XIV, also known as the Sun King. There were Black servants in the French royal court at the time, so there is a possibility that Louis slept with one of his enslaved servants, and she gave birth to his child.

Her existence is mentioned in the Memoirs of Mademoiselle de Montpensier, Memoirs of Madame de Montespan, and Memoirs of the duc de Saint-Simon.

== History ==
=== Birth parentage theories ===
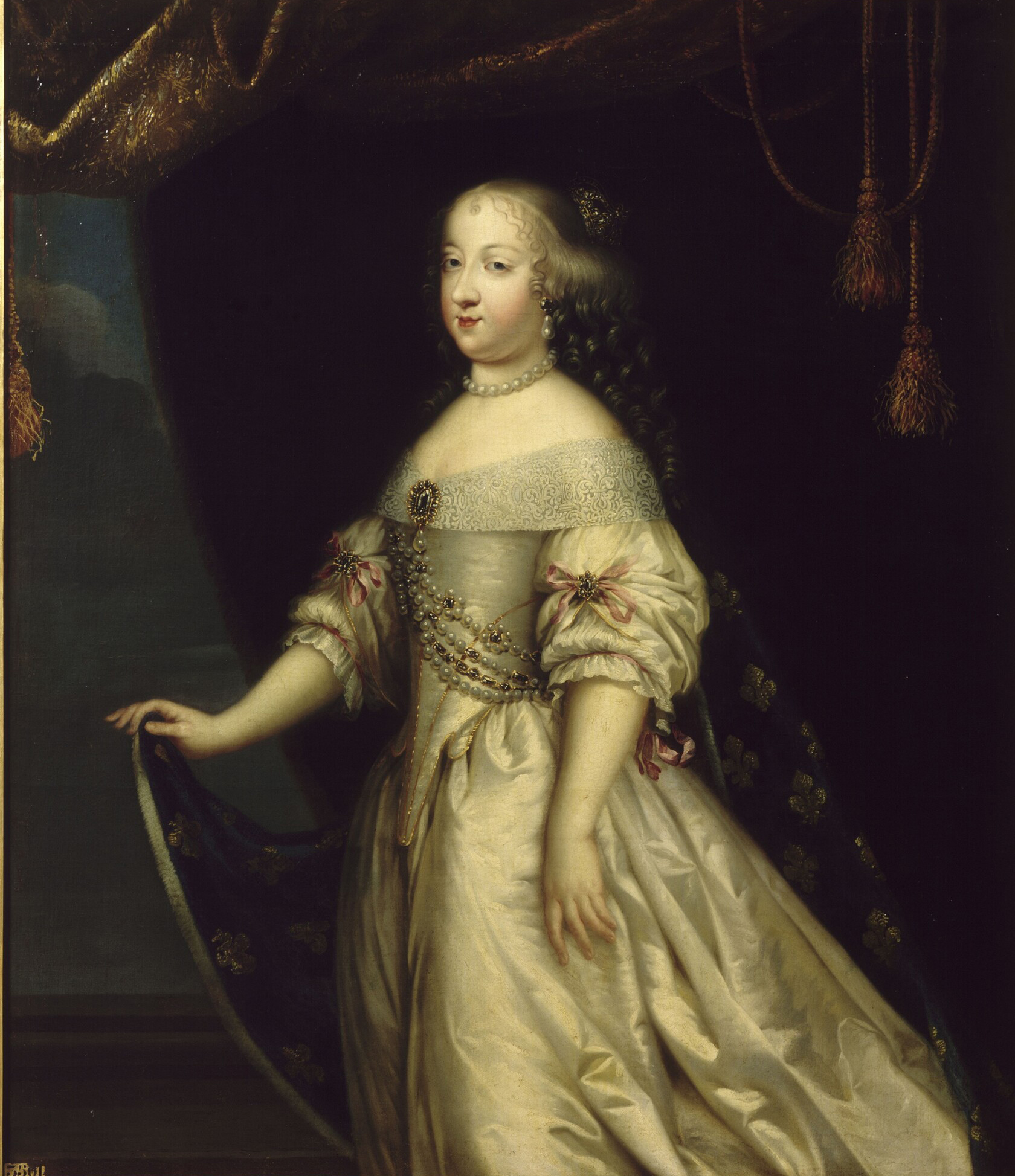
Marie-Thérèse of Spain, Queen of France

Rumors created at the court of Versailles suggested that Queen Maria Teresa had a second child, besides Louis, Grand Dauphin, in 1664. This child was rumoured to be Louise Marie Thérèse. There were claims that this child survived infancy and had its existence concealed into adulthood. This birth was alleged to have been the product of a romance with an African courtier who was a dwarf named Nabo. Historians generally support the official account of the child's identity as Marie-Anne, not Louise Marie Thérèse.

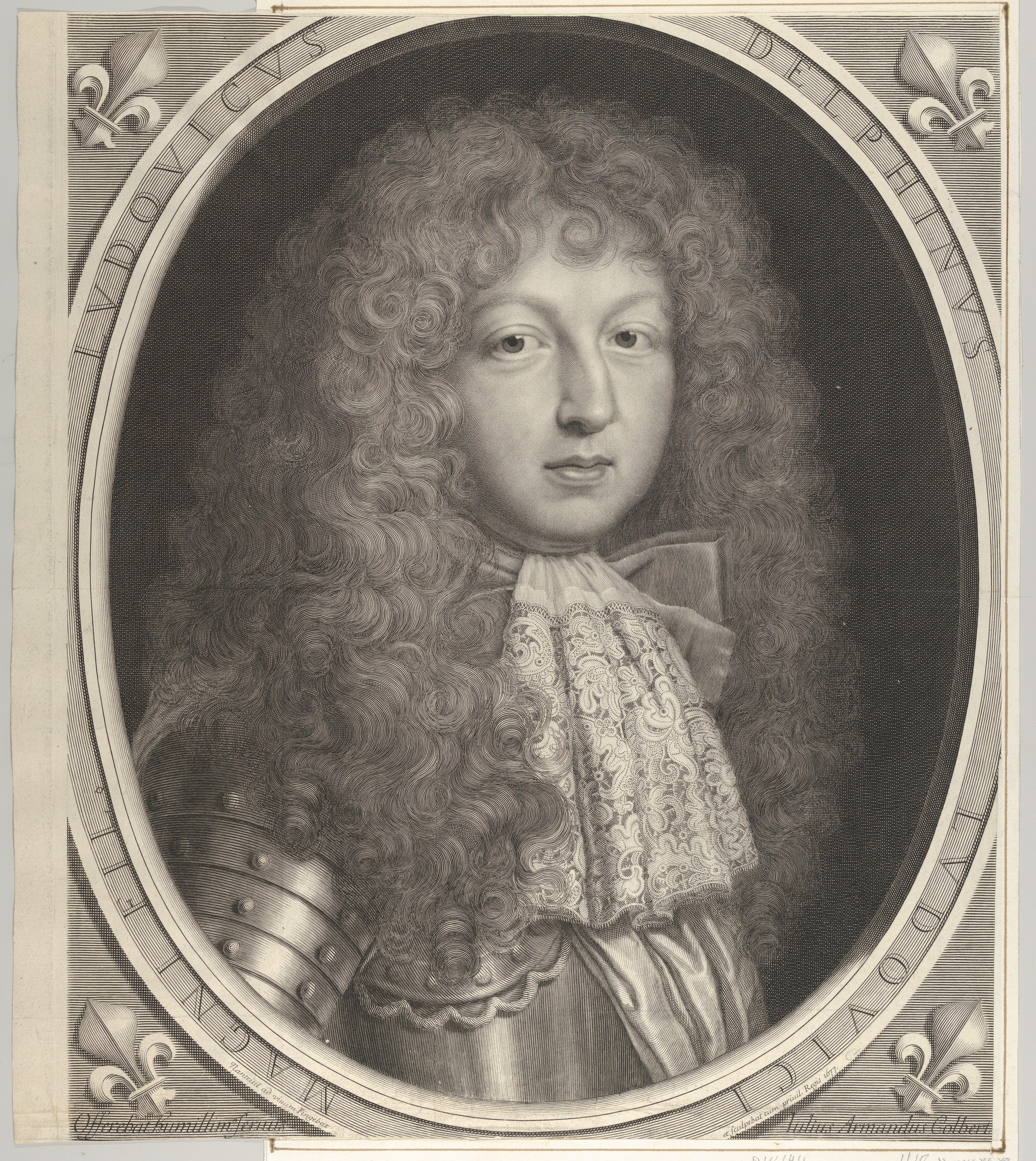
Louis, called Le Grand Dauphin or Monseigneur, is the supposed brother of Louise Marie-Thérèse

Marie-Anne's body was most likely dark-complexioned at birth due to her mother being ill, the infant born premature, and her body being oxygen-deprived, rather than the baby being of African descent. Historians doubt that Marie-Anne survived because attending physicians noted her sickness and nothing else about her appearance, and both her birth and death were subject to public viewing.

=== Adulthood ===
Louise Marie Thérèse was a Benedictine nun in the abbey of Notre-Dame of the Nativity Catholic Church in Moret-sur-Loing. She was called the "Mauresse de Moret" ("Mooress of Moret"), and a portrait of her exists in the Bibliothèque Sainte Geneviève in Paris. Research conducted by the Société de l'histoire de Paris et d'Ile-de-France, published in 1924 by Honoré Champion éditions, concluded that this pastel portrait was painted around 1680 by the same hand which painted the series of 22 pastel portraits of Kings of France, from Louis IX to Louis XIV, between 1681 and 1683 on the initiative of Father Claude Du Molinet (1620–1687), librarian of Sainte Geneviève abbey.

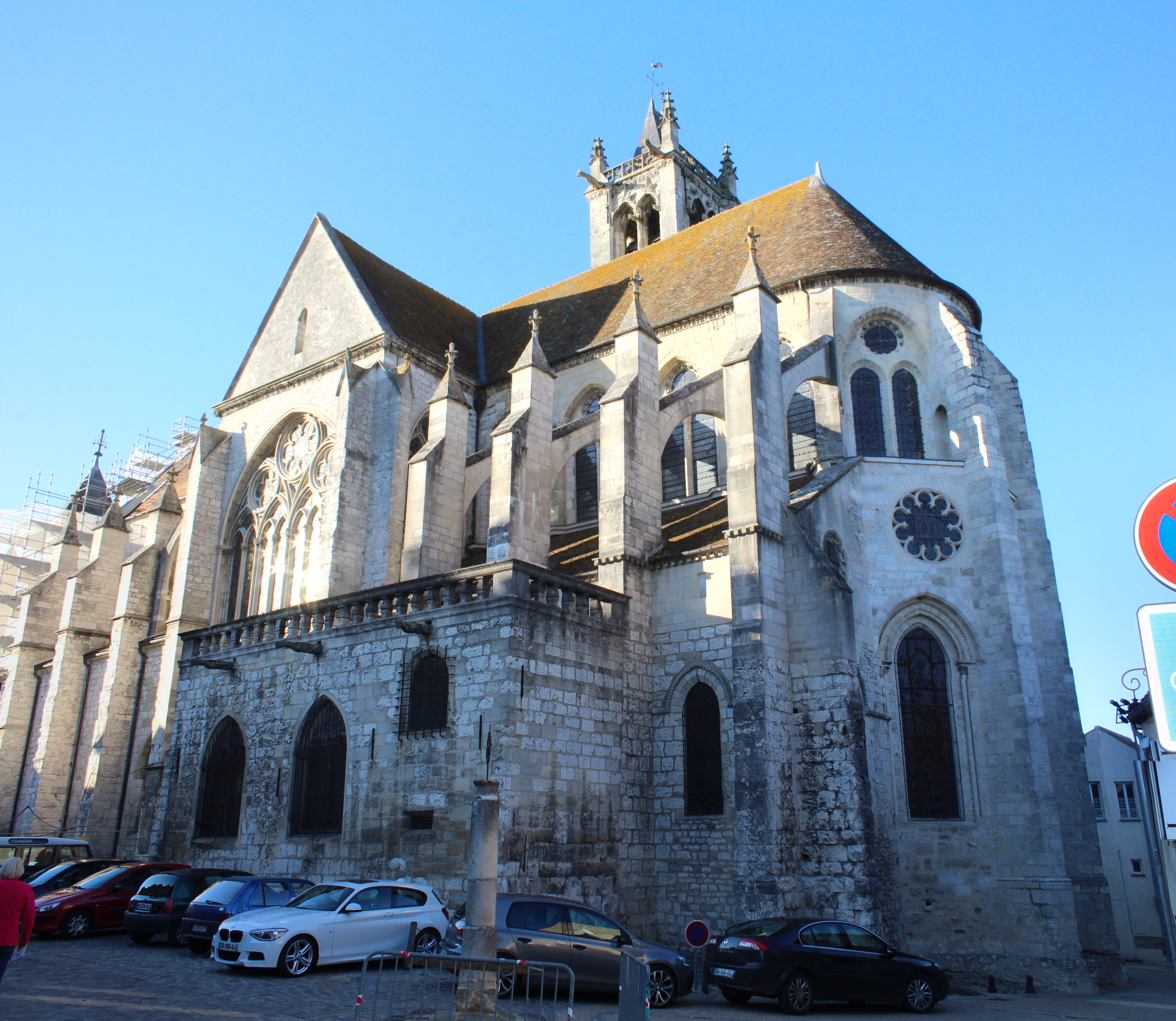
Notre-Dame of the Nativity Nativity in Moret-sur-Loing

The majority of accounts describing Louise Marie Thérèse's life agree that she was financially supported by King Louis XIV. However, many accounts differ on why this was. Voltaire suggested, in 1751, that Louise was likely one of many illegitimate children of King Louis XIV. Others at the time suggested that Louise fabricated the story.

Several writers from the time have devoted paragraphs to her: she is mentioned in the memoirs of Madame de Maintenon, the Grande Mademoiselle, Madame de Montespan, Duke of Saint-Simon, Voltaire, Cardinal Dubois, and in the Journal of the Duc de Luynes. The Duke of Saint-Simon writes:

It seems that in this convent there was a woman of colour, a Moorish woman, who had been placed there very young by Bontems, valet of the King. She received the utmost care and attention, but never was shown to anybody. When the late Queen or Madame de Maintenon went, they did not always see her, but always watched over her welfare. She was treated with more consideration than people the most distinguished; and herself made much of the care that was taken of her, and the mystery by which she was surrounded. Although she lived regularly, it was easy to see she was not too contented with her position. Hearing Monseigneur hunt in the forest one day, she forgot herself so far as to exclaim, 'My brother is hunting!' It was pretended that she was a daughter of the King and Queen, but that she had been hidden away on account of her colour; and the report was spread that the Queen had had a miscarriage. Many people believed this story; but whether it was true or not has remained an enigma.

— Louis De Rouvroy, Memoirs of the Duc de Saint-Simon, Vol 2 Ch. XII

Louise Marie Thérèse herself seemed convinced of her royal birth, and Saint-Simon states that she once greeted the Dauphin as "my brother". A letter sent on 13 June 1685, by the Secretary of the King's Household to M. De Bezons, general agent of the clergy, and the pension of 300 pounds granted by King Louis XIV to the nun Louise Marie-Thérèse on 15 October 1695, "to be paid to her all her life in this convent or everywhere she could be, by the guards of the Royal treasure present and to come" suggest that she may, indeed, have had royal connections. The duc de Luynes claimed that she was the daughter of two black gardeners, too poor to educate her, who applied to Mme. de Maintenon for patronage.

== Legacy and impact ==
In 1978, French writer Pierre-Marie Dijol published the book Nabo, ou le Masque de Fer, in which he claimed that the nun's father was Nabo, Queen Maria Theresa's dwarf black page, who was removed from court by order of the king soon after Louise Marie-Thérèse's birth, and incarcerated as the Man in the Iron Mask, under the pseudonym of "Eustache Dauger".

Marie-Thérèse's birth is depicted in the first three episodes of the TV drama series Versailles, which premiered in France in 2015. In the show, she is portrayed as the illegitimate daughter of Queen Maria Theresa and Prince Annaba of Assinia, with a dwarf named Nabo implicated and found dead, and the child later used as a political bargaining tool by the prince-turned-king.
