= Château de Janvry =

Château in Janvry, Essonne, France

Coordinates: 48°38′54″N 2°9′15″E

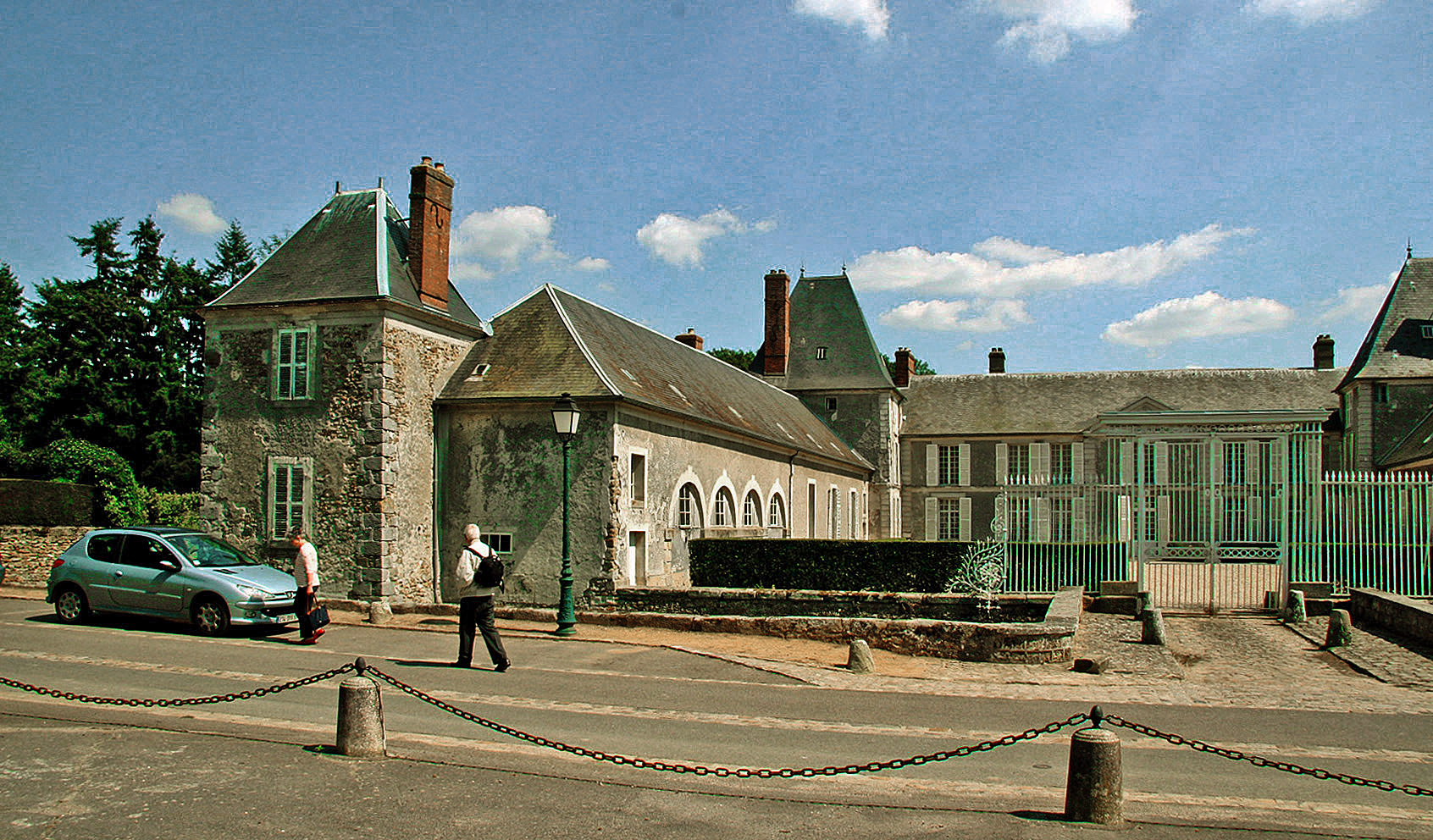
Entrance

The Château de Janvry is a stately home in the French village of Janvry, Essonne. It is in the Île-de-France region, 27 km south-west of Paris.

The château dates back to the 17th century. It is still partially surrounded by watered moats. Its main building includes a primary wing facing west and two attached side wings, the north wing and the south wing. All wings are linked, creating a U-shaped château. The château was listed as an historical monument by the Demeure Historique Association in the early 1980s.

== History ==
The château was built around 1600 and 1650 in the Louis XIII architectural style. It has been part of the Reille family for many centuries. The château has always been passed from generation to generation by the women of the family. Therefore, each succession brought a new last name as the estate's owner. The families of Anjoran and Reille are among those who inherited the château. During the French Revolution of 1789, the château was robbed, resulting in the family losing all of its older documents regarding the château, its estate and history. Since the mid-19th century, the château has been used as a secondary residence by the family. The monument located at the village entrance was built following the death of Elisabeth Anjoran while giving birth in 1847.

The Baron Jean Victor Reille inherited the domain during the Second World War. As the château had been unoccupied by the Reille family during the war, German, English and French troops successively lodged in the château. Local inhabitants witnessed the degradation of the property by some of the French troops, unlike the Germans or the English, who took care of the estate. Some soldiers extracted wood panels from the original 17th-century hardwood floors to use as fuel for the master living room chimney during the harsh winter months. Today, traces of the new and replaced wooden panels can be seen in some parts of the formal living rooms. Also, in a bedroom on the second floor of the north-west tower, some inscriptions and writings on the walls can be found, witnessing the occupancy by French soldiers.

When Baron Jean Reille arrived at the château after the war, nettles were growing in some of the rooms of the house. Over the next few years following the end of the Second World, he and his wife Liliane successfully gave the château back its ancient splendor by installing a new roof, adding modern plumbing and electricity, also remodeling the interior of the house. His son, the Baron Ghislain Reille, pursued this laborious work when he took responsibility of the house in the 1980s. The château is now a modern property where many renovations have been made within the original style and charm of the Louis XIII-style château.

In recent years, film and television production companies have used the château in their productions, but the only time the château has ever been open to the public was in 1995 for a fireworks show.

== Tourism ==
Visitors access the main building using a bridge passing over the moats, through a very large wrought iron portal which leads to the formal courtyard ('Cour d’Honneur'). The portal key weights around 1 kilo (two pounds) and measures up to 30 centimeters (12 inches) long. Leading to the château from the fields to the west is a 200-yard (180 m) alley, bordered with poplars ('l’Allee des Peupliers'). This alley was the original château's entrance, and is now covered with maintained grass as a paved village street which crosses the alley along the moats, separating the alley from the château, creating easy access for visitors and owners. The Cour d’Honneur is a large 50 by 50 meter courtyard covered with white gravel. It is surrounded by grassy areas and plants separating the courtyard in symmetric areas, giving a perspective view of the main building to the arriving visitor.

The main building follows a Louis XIII architectural style. Following this architecture trends, the château shows a very typical dissymmetry, unique to the Louis XIII style. The west side of the main building has four windows left to the main entrance, and three on the right side. Similarly, on the east side of the building (facing the private park), five windows can be found on the right of the entrance door and four on the left.

== The main building ==
The central part of the château (the west wing), includes the master living room, dining room, billiard and the château's formal entryway. All rooms have windows facing east and west. These rooms receive natural daylight from the sunrise over the park to sunset over the fields and the poplar alley. The second floor includes a long corridor leading to several bedroom suites overlooking the private park and garden.

The lower floor of the north wing was originally designed to store stagecoaches for lords or visitors. Since then, the arches where the stagecoaches were stored have been filled, but are still easily visible.

The south wing faces the small courtyard and is a fully functional home with its own private entrance, kitchen and large living/dining room on the first floor. The second floor is accessible through private staircases. Four bedrooms and a bathroom can be found on the second floor. The south wing was originally intended for the staff's use. The entrance to this wing used to be the fruit cellar. There is a separate apartment on the first floor. The kitchen was a bedroom, and the current living/dining room was a small studio. The second floor rooms were accessible through the staircases found on the southern part of the west wing.

=== The small courtyard ===
The courtyard is surrounded by barns and stables forming a closed square where poultry, cattle and other farm animals used to be raised. All barns still have many traces of past activities. In one cowshed, some cows' names can be seen. The stable is still functional and can house up to four horses. The attics above the barns are sumptuous, with their vaulted ceilings and large oak beams from the local forests. One barn in particular has ceilings soaring 15–20 metres high. They were used to storing cereals and grains. One of the barns leads to the south-western part of the tower, where four jail cells can still be found. In order to preserve its authenticity, no one has ever renovated these cells. Only a small and inaccessible fanlight gives air and light to the room. Two of the four jail doors are still present. It has been confirmed that these jail cells were being used during the Second World War for war prisoners.

=== The cellar ===
The cellar runs under the entire west and north wings. The vaulted cellar has been used to store food and wine for many years. The cider and apple liquor produced in the château were stored there to mature.

=== The well ===
Although the well is filled with rain water, it is still functional and filled each winter with water running down from the gutters.

=== The park ===
The château is surrounded by a 14 hectare (34.5 acres) park. The park offers complete privacy and is surrounded by stone walls except for a small section wire netted. The park includes 10 hectares of forest with large alleys for leisurely strolls. There is more than two hectares of grassy area, half of which is mowed lawn. A one hectare lake and a tennis court are also located in the park. The park is accessible to modern vehicles through the small courtyard. There are also two portals located on the east and north walls.

The park includes a high density of medium to small trees, with primarily large oaks (some of which will reach maturity in a few years). Those multi-century old oaks stand all across the park. According to experts, the oldest oak is more than 300 years old. The park has been designed over the centuries to include many tree species: oaks, beeches (including the red beech alley), elms, hazel and chestnut trees.

To the north of the château is a large orchard with various fruit trees and an organic vegetable garden that is maintained all year. Chicken coops and other small farm animals (geese, etc.) are also in this garden.

The château's icebox, where ice brought by horses was stored under the oak trees' coolness, can be found close to the east portal. This icebox has long been used by the château's staff.

A legend says that the nearby Château de Saint Jean de Beauregard and a monastery (now disappeared) located in the Arpajon forest were linked through a network of tunnels. Those tunnels were built to allow the owners to escape in the event of danger. Traces of those tunnels are clearly visible in the park, but no confirmation has been given to the tunnel's destination or length today.

=== The estate ===
Surrounding the village, the château and its park (mostly centred on the northern part of the château), the estate includes 65 hectares (160 acres) of farming fields and 105 hectares (260 acres) of forest.

== Location ==
The Château de Janvry is located 30 kilometers (19 mi) from the center of Paris.

== Activities ==
Today, the Château de Janvry often appears in films, magazines and photo shoots.

The castle serves as a set for the Fly High music video of the kpop group Dreamcatcher, released 27 July 2017.

It is rented for private parties and hunting of both small game (pheasants, partridges and duck) and big game (roe deer, deer, boar) hunts.
