= Château de Sedaiges =

Château de Sédaiges
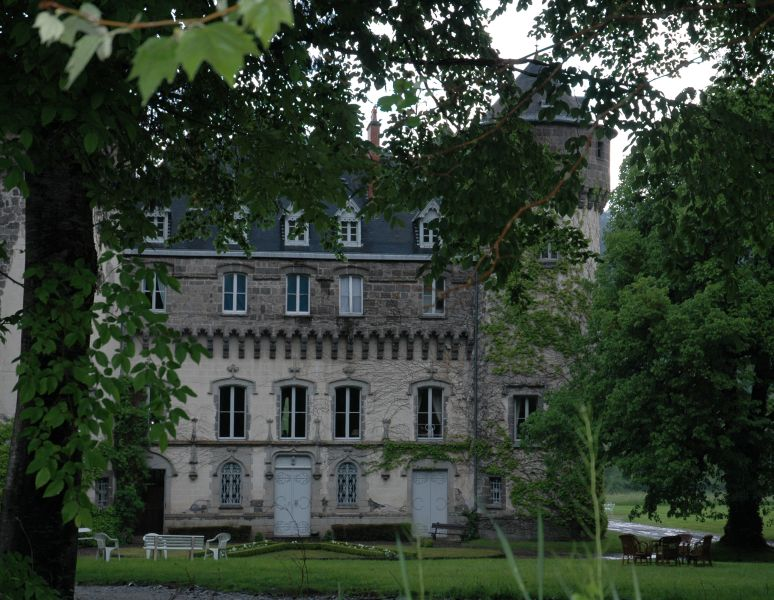
- The main facade of Château de Sédaiges

- Location within France

General information
- Type: Château
- Architectural style: Gothic Revival (Troubadour style)
- Location: Marmanhac, Cantal, France
- Coordinates: 45°00′10″N 02°28′56″E
- Construction started: 15th century
- Completed: 1865 (Troubadour remodel)
- Client: Raymond de Caissac (1452)
- Owner: De Riverieux de Varax family

Design and construction
- Architect: Parent

Website
- chateausedaiges.com

Monument historique
- Designated: 24 September 1987
- Reference no.: PA00093540

Château de Sédaiges (French pronunciation: [ʃɑto d(ə) sedɛʒ]) is a castle located in the French commune of Marmanhac, within the Cantal département in the Auvergne-Rhône-Alpes region. Originating in the Middle Ages and extensively remodeled in the 19th-century Troubadour style (Gothic Revival), the structure has been officially protected as a Monument historique since September 24, 1987. The château has remained uninterruptedly in the possession of the same family (and their direct descendants) since 1442. As a result, it preserves an exceptionally comprehensive and pristine interior collection, including original period furniture, historic costumes, and everyday artifacts spanning several centuries.

== History ==
Castles & Châteaux in Cantal
(Feudal Levy of 1533)

💥 The Caissac Alliance (Red/Orange)

Sédaiges (Ancestral seat from 1442)
Messac (Acquired 1535)
Trémolière (Jouvenroux marriage 1517)
Pesteils (Pestels marriage 1664)
Anjony (via House of Pestels)

🔵 Other Feudal Seats (Blue/Green)

Caillac (Lord of La Salle)
Conros (Barons of Aurillac)
Cropières (Fontanges family)
Comblat (Seat in Carladès)

=== Origins and the House of Caissac ===
A noble family bearing the toponymic name *de Sédaiges* is historically documented in Marmanhac since the 13th century. Following the structural devastations of the Hundred Years' War, the knight Pierre de Sédaiges was forced in 1442 to sell the property to Jean Calsac (also recorded as *de Caissac*), a wealthy bourgeois merchant from Aurillac.

His son, Raymond de Caissac, successfully obtained formal permission from the other co-seigneurs of Marmanhac in 1452 to erect a heavily fortified residence equipped with towers and projecting machicolations, which was completed after 1461. For over ten consecutive generations, the château remained strictly within the male line of the House of de Caissac, who systematically expanded their regional territorial footprint and socio-political influence via calculated dynastic marriages.

=== Early Modern Period (16th to 18th Centuries) ===
In 1517, Nicolas de Caissac married Marguerite de Jouvenroux, a daughter of the Lord of Château de La Trémolière. Their descendants continued to inhabit and manage the estate through the direct male line, ultimately consolidating full judicial and seigneurial rights over the entire domain of Marmanhac by 1590.

==== The Feudal Levy of 1533 ====
In 1533, the château was officially registered as a fortified noble seat in the formal records of the military muster (frz. Ban et arrière-ban) for the *Haut pays d'Auvergne*. During the formal inspection and review of troops, which took place on May 15, 1533, at the Place du Gravier in Aurillac in the presence of the royal prosecutor Pierre Clavière, the fief was assigned to the Prévôté d’Aurillac. By royal decree, the Caissac family was legally obligated to maintain and provide a fully equipped man-at-arms wearing a brigandine (a flexible coat of armored metal scales) to serve the defensive needs of the French King. Two years after this muster, in 1535, the family widened its regional influence when Nicolas de Caissac acquired the neighboring Château de Messac through a conditional mortgage loan agreement.

==== Dynastic Network in the Carladès ====
The close placement of the lords of Sédaiges within the regional aristocratic networks of the Carladès is illustrated by the marriage of Nicolas's descendant, Edme de Caissac (Lord of Messac, Sédaiges, and co-seigneur of Tournemire). In 1664, he married Marguerite de Pestels, a daughter of Claude de Pestels, the reigning Lord of Château de Pesteils, and Claude d'Anjony from the ancient lineage of the nearby Château d'Anjony. This marriage produced at least three children, cementing the château's ties to the most formidable regional military fortresses.

Among the subsequent lords of the manor, François de Caissac (1545–1618) achieved significant status. He served as a Gentleman of the King's Bedchamber (French: Gentilhomme de la Chambre du roi) and was inducted in 1602 as a knight into the prestigious Order of Saint Michael, completing the family's transition into the high nobility. His son, Alexandre de Caissac, married Sybille de Glandières in 1614, a daughter of the humanist poet Louis de Glandières (known literary as *Louis de Balsac*). With the childless death of Jean IV de Caissac in 1746, the original male line became extinct. The inheritance passed to his sister Madeleine, whose marriage to Pierre Béral established the branch of *Béral de Massebeau*.

=== Modern Era and Present Day ===
During the upheavals of the French Revolution, the château was spared the destruction and partition that befell many surrounding aristocratic estates. In the 19th century, the sole heiress Mathilde de Béral de Sédaiges brought the entire estate by marriage into the de Riverieux de Varax family. The family retains direct ownership of the château to this day, opening the complex to public tours during the summer months and operating it as a private event venue.

== Description ==
=== Architecture and Troubadour Reconstruction ===
The château presents itself as a compact, symmetrical, square residential block with three main floors, anchored at all four corners by massive circular defensive towers. The architectural fabric represents three distinct structural eras:

- 15th Century (Late Medieval): The overall footprint and the structural defensive elements of the southern façade—including an authentic, medieval chemise walkway—remain preserved from the original construction phase post-1461.
- 1741 (Baroque Modernization): In 1741, the fortress was updated to meet the residential standards of the era. The narrow medieval loops and narrow windows were opened up into large, symmetrical window axes to allow light to penetrate the interior. The rooms were also fitted with refined wood paneling (French:boiseries).
- Circa 1865 (Troubadour Style): Around 1865, the family commissioned the renowned historicist architect Parent (a student of Eugène Viollet-le-Duc) to perform a deep Gothic Revival renovation. Parent maintained the core layout but systematically redesigned the façades in the Late Gothic style of the late 15th century. He added reconstructed battlements to the remaining three corner towers based on the southern model, and roofed over the formerly open central inner courtyard, converting it into a monumental, multi-story neogotical reception hall adorned with historicist fresco cycles and intricate wood carvings.

=== Park and Gardens ===
The château is situated within an expansive English landscape park that is officially registered as a "Remarkable Garden" (French: Parc remarquable) by the French state. The estate includes water features and ornamental lakes, a historic heritage orchard (verger), and a traditional managed kitchen garden in French known as (potager).

== Bibliography ==
- Chanoine Pastisson: Marmanhac. Aurillac 1926.
- Jean-Baptiste de Ribier du Châtelet: Marmanhac. In: Dictionnaire statistique, ou Histoire, description et statistique du département du Cantal. Aurillac 1857.
