= Marie Angélique de Scorailles =

Mistress of Louis XIV (1661–1681)

- Duchess of Fontanges
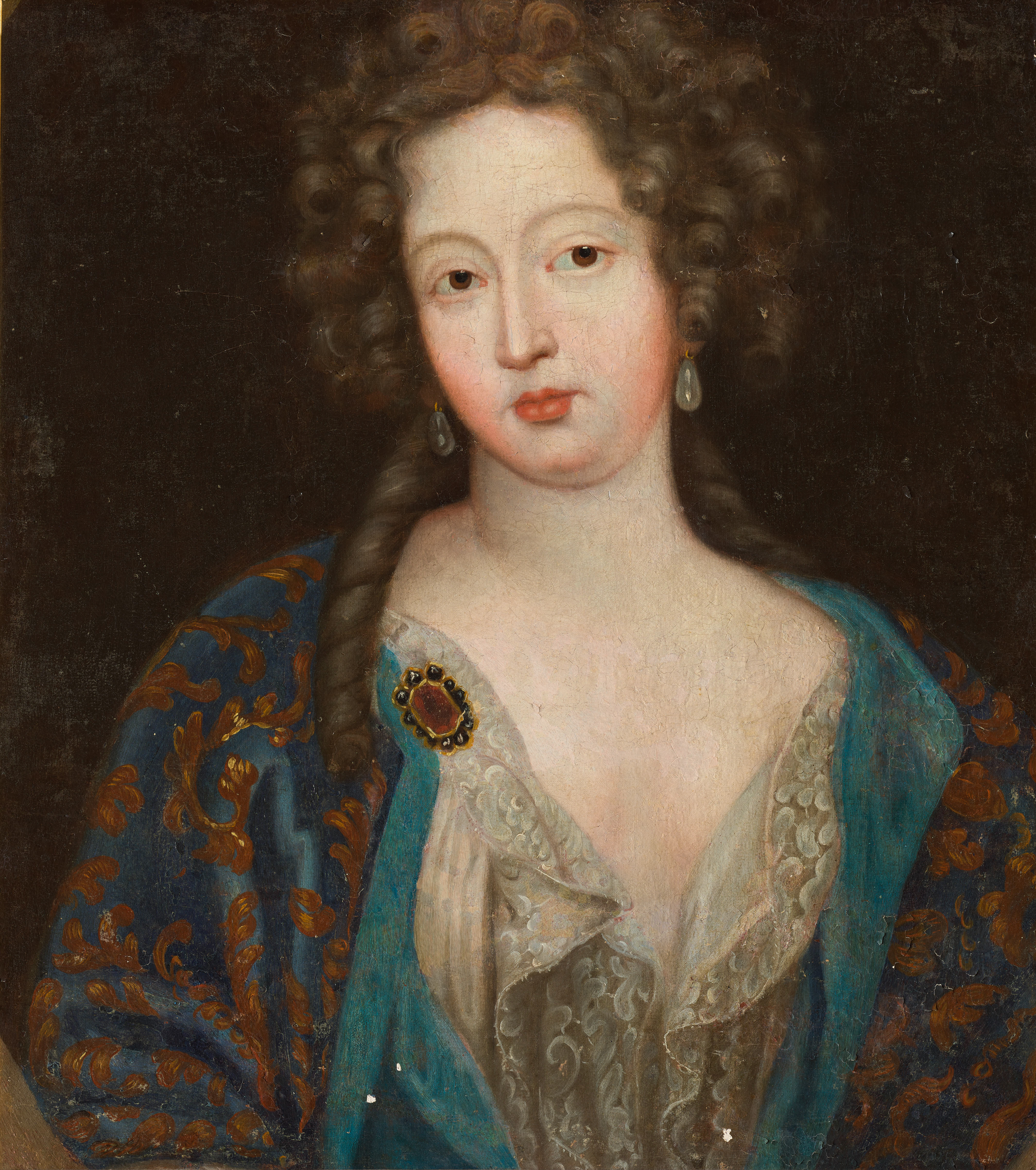
- Full name: Marie Angélique de Scorailles de Roussille
- Known for: Mistress of Louis XIV
- Born: July 27, 1661; Château de Cropières, Auvergne, France
- Died: 27 June 1681 (aged 19); Abbaye de Port Royal, France
- Occupation: Lady-in-waiting to Elizabeth Charlotte, Madame Palatine

Marie Angélique de Scorailles, Duchess of Fontanges (French pronunciation: [maʁi ɑ̃ʒelik də skɔʁaj]; July 1661 – 28 June 1681) was a French noblewoman and mistress of Louis XIV. Additionally she held the position of a lady-in-waiting to his sister-in-law Elizabeth Charlotte, Madame Palatine, the Duchess of Orléans. Marie caught the attention of the Sun King and began an affair with him in 1679. She died two years later, most probably as a result of complications arising from childbirth.

== Royal Mistress ==
Marie Angélique de Scorailles was born in 1661 at the Château de Cropières in Upper Auvergne. She came from a very old aristocratic family; her father was the Comte de Rousaille, and the King's Lieutenant. Her family eventually came to realization that her beauty was a great asset and raised enough money to send her to court, with the aim of restoring the family fortunes. Marie arrived at the court of Louis XIV in 1678 and became maid of honor to the Duchess of Orléans. At the time Louis XIV had appeared to be losing interest in his longtime established mistress Madame de Montespan and turning to the governess of their children, Madame de Maintenon. Infatuated by the beauty of the young girl, the king suddenly abandoned both women, and the stand-off between the two was suddenly eclipsed by a new passion which appeared to threaten them both equally.

Despite her physical charms, Marie Angélique was said by the court to be "as stupid as a basket." The Duchess of Orleans wrote "[she is] a stupid little creature, but she [has] a very good heart" but described her as "lovely as an angel, from head to foot".

Louis XIV displayed renewed enthusiasm and adorned himself with diamonds, ribbons, and feathers, reportedly influenced by his affection for Marie. He presented her with a pearl grey carriage with eight horses.

During a hunt in the forest of Fontainebleau, her hair clung to a branch and she appeared before the king with her hair loosely tied in a ribbon, tumbling in curls to her shoulders. The king found this rustic style delightful, and the next day many courtiers adopted the new "fontange" hairstyle, except the Marquise de Montespan, who thought it was in "bad taste". Two pet bears belonging to Montespan escaped from their menagerie and managed to find, and destroy, Marie's apartment in Versailles. This event was widely discussed at court, highlighting the tension between the two women.

Soon it appeared she was pregnant, further angering Montespan, who had thought their affair was a passing fancy, easily controlled and easily disposed of. She said to the Marquise de Maintenon that the king had three mistresses: herself in name, this girl in bed and Maintenon in his heart.

In January 1680, Marie gave premature birth to a stillborn boy, and was said to have been "wounded in the service of the King." In April, Louis granted her the title Duchess of Fontanges and a pension of 80,000 livres, as was his usual habit on ending love affairs. Unwell after the birth, she retired to the Abbey of Chelles.

== Death ==
In 1681, Marie suffered a high fever and was sent to the Abbey of Port-Royal, where, according to some sources, she gave birth prematurely to a stillborn girl in March. Realising she was going to die, she asked to see the king, who, touched by her suffering, wept while at her deathbed. Fontanges is reported to have said, "having seen tears in the eyes of my King, I can die happy". This story was deemed untrue by many at Versailles because according to them, the king had, in fact, already forgotten her. The duchess died on the night of 28 June 1681. She was not yet 20 years old.

Louis XIV expressed the wish that there be no autopsy, however, at the request of her family, one was performed. The doctors found that her lungs were in appalling condition (with the right one in particular being full of "purulent matter") while her chest was flooded with fluid. All six doctors concurred that death was due to natural causes.

=== Possible death by poisoning ===
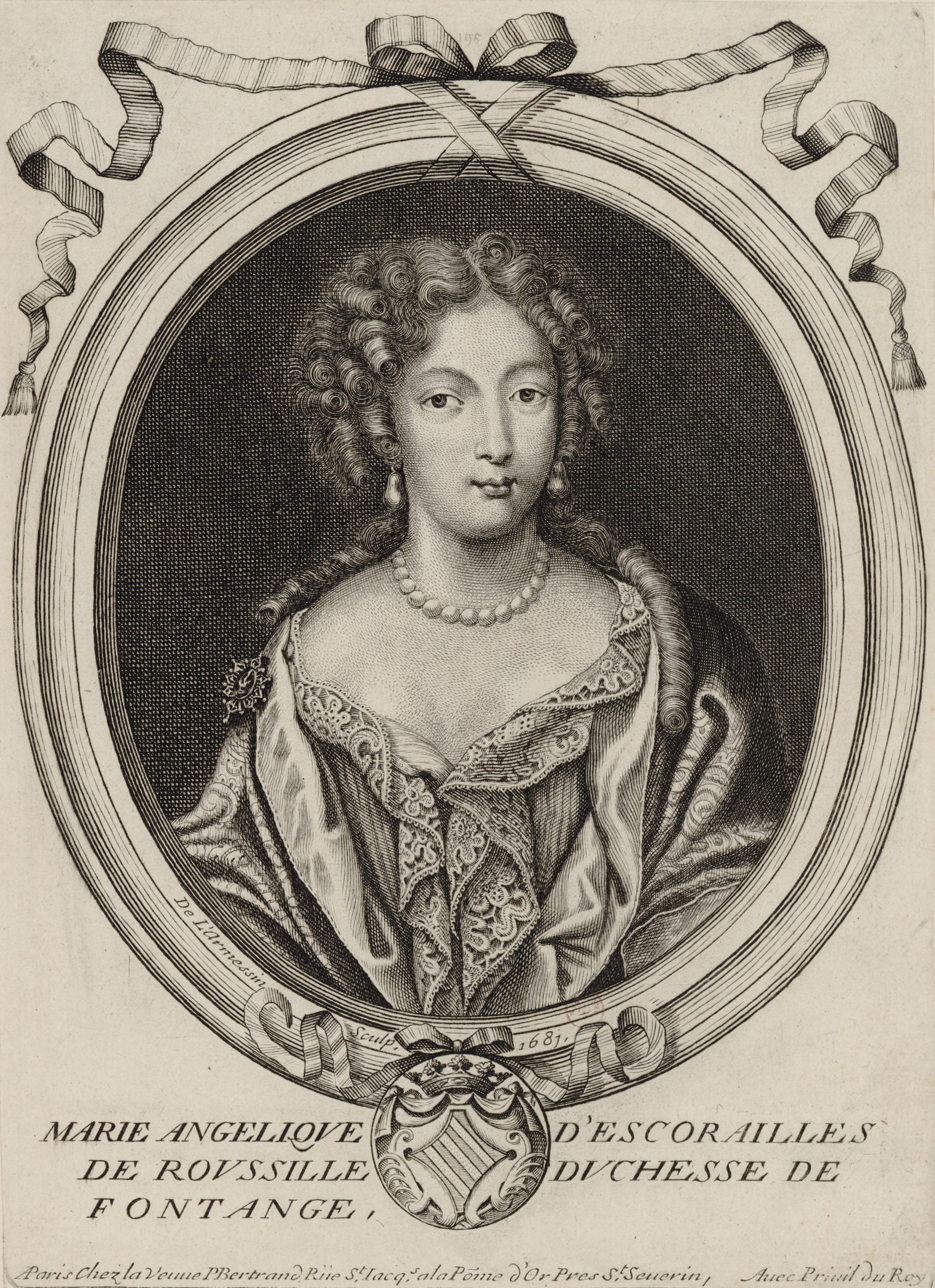
La duchesse de Fontanges

As Marie Angélique died during the Affair of the Poisons in France, poisoning was suspected. During interrogations, some of the accused had mentioned the name of Fontanges, and several other women of the court in connection to various schemes and plots. Marguerite Monvoisin, the daughter of sorceress La Voisin was the first to accuse accomplices of her late mother of poisoning the duchess. Monvoisin's lovers, Bertrand and Romani, were arrested in 1681 as suspects. Bertrand was accused of selling poisonous stuffs to Fontanges; while Romani was accused of delivering her gloves contaminated with poison.

Françoise Filastre, a servant in the household of Fontanges was arrested, and when asked about what she knew about the duchess's death, under torture claimed that Montespan had hired her to murder Fontanges, so she could regain the love of the king. Before being executed, Filastre later recanted : "All I said is false. I did that for me to be free of pain and torment. I say all this because I do not want to kill the guilty conscience of a lie." Although rumours of poisoning abounded, dubious evidence from various unreliable witnesses who either recanted or contradicted each other meant no charges were ever laid.

=== Aftermath ===
Historian Antonia Fraser suggests that Marie Angélique died from pleuro-pneumonia induced by tuberculosis. As she was known to have suffered from a persistent loss of blood after her miscarriage, another doctor suggested that when she lost her baby, a fragment of the placenta lodged in her uterus. An alternative suggestion is that she was killed by a rare form of cancer, which occasionally develops after a cyst on the placenta is expelled during pregnancy. The probability is that she died from complications arising from her earlier miscarriage.

At court, several courtiers wrote about the duchess's death. According to Ernest Lavisse and Bernard Noël, "Two miscarriages caused her to lose favor with the king." The Duchess of Orleans claimed that it was certain the duchess was poisoned by Madame de Montespan, and suspected that the poison was administered in her milk. Despite the medical findings, rumours persisted that the Duchess of Fontanges died from poisoning.

=== In film ===
- L'Affaire des poisons (1955) played by Christine Carère
- Royal Affairs in Versailles (1954) played by Nicole Maurey

== See also ==
- French royal mistresses
- 1650–1700 in fashion
