= Catherine Trianon =

Catherine Trianon (née Boule or Boullain, called La Trianon 1627 – 6 May 1681), was a French fortune teller and astrologer, known for her involvement in the famous Affair of the Poisons. She along with other colleagues were responsible for the attempted assassination of King Louis XIV in 1679.

== Life and career ==
Catherine Trianon, was a widow and a professional fortune teller. She was considered to be one of the most important associates of La Voisin, but also a personal friend and confidante.

La Trianon managed her business with her business partner La Dodée, who was also her lover. Trianon was described by her colleagues as very well educated, with more learning "in her fingertips" than what most people could accumulate in a lifetime, and was widely respected for her learning. Later, upon her arrest, the authorities was to find 25 "manuscript volumes on the occult sciences" in her house.

In her capacity of a fortune teller, La Trianon appear to have been foremost an astrologer, and often constructed horoscopes on the assignment of La Voisin and her clients.

When La Voisin had refused her request to convince the executioner to preserve the fngertips of executed criminals for her, La Trianon had collected the desired items herself from the bodies of executed criminals on the place of execution; she also had a reception room that contained a human skeleton, which was said to serve as a pious reminder of mortality.

=== Poison Affair ===
It's alleged that in 1679, Madame de Montespan commissioned La Voisin to murder King Louis XIV of France. It was at the home of Trianon that La Voisin is said to have conspired with the help of her lovers, Bertrand and Romani. As a friend, Trianon tried to convince La Voisin to abandon the plan, even making up a horoscope to warn her that it would be a mistake, but did not succeed. The group decided that the King should be poisoned by a petition. According to her accusers, on 5 March, La Voisin's first attempt at poisoning the King failed; she planned to meet with Trianon on 12 March to plan the next attempt but was arrested before anything transpired. Shortly after La Voisin's arrest in May, Trianon was arrested.

In August 1680, after the execution of La Voisin in February, the connection between La Voisin, Montespan, and the plan to assassinate the King was supposedly revealed by her daughter, Marguerite Monvoisin, who on 9 October appeared to confirm the statements made by Adam Lesage in August of child sacrifice at the black masses. After her statements about Montespan and child sacrifice were seemingly confirmed by Francoise Filastre on 1 October and Etienne Guibourg on 10 October, Trianon, who was allegedly involved in the attempt, also confirmed the statement. Catherine Trianon committed suicide in Château de Vincennes.

== In fiction ==
Catherine Trianon is given a fairly large portrayal in a novel by Judith Merkle Riley: The Oracle Glass (1994)
