= Lappet =

Hanging part of a headdress or garment

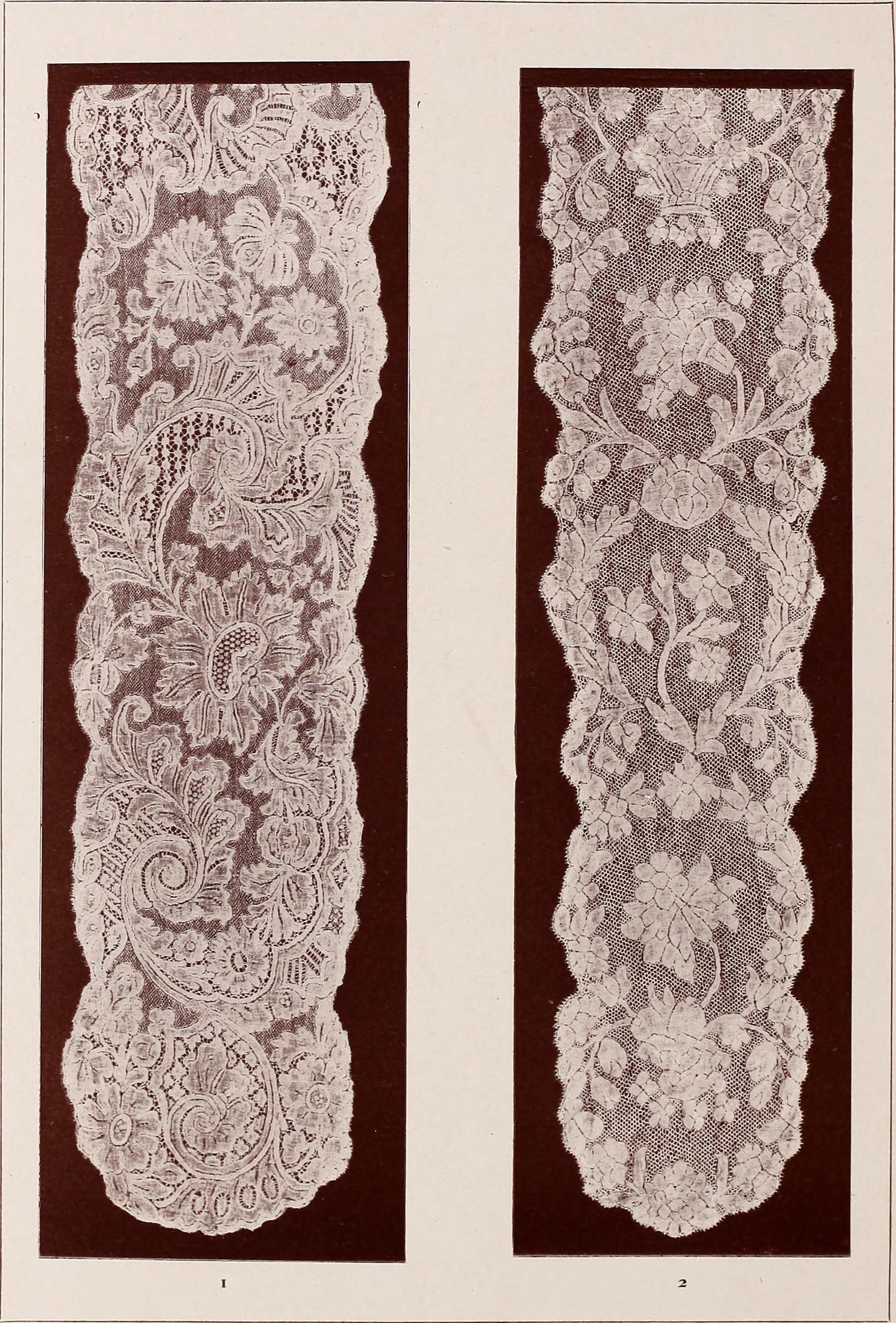
Two eighteenth-century lace lappets

A lappet is a decorative flap, fold or hanging part of a headdress or garment. Worn in a pair, or as a singular long strip giving a symmetrical drape, lappets formed a popular part of women's headwear until the early-twentieth century, and remain a feature of religious garments. Examples of lappets appear on the papal tiara and on the nemes headdress of the kings of ancient Egypt. The same term is also used for similar-looking anatomical features on some animals.

== On women's headdresses ==
Lappets were attached to some types of women's headdresses, notably the medieval hennin. They were also called cornet, although cornet sometimes referred to the hennin itself.

Towards the end of the 17th century, a cap called the fontange, worn in the home, was popularised. Made of linen and given height by an internal wire frame called a commode, the fontange featured much decoration, formed of linen and lace, including the key feature being lappets. The fontange, with its lappets, was popularised in the French Court around the 1690s.

Into the 18th and 19th centuries, the fashion for lappets worn in the west as a women's fashionable decorative accessory (for indoor wear) expanded. Through this period, lappets were bright white or black in colour, and made of either simple or highly decorative hand or machine-made lace, or plain lightweight fabrics, including silk. During the 18th and 19th centuries, as in the centuries before, lappets would be worn draped to the back of the hair or sides of the face. While some formed part of a headdress, other lappets could be pinned to the top of the hair in a pleated fashion, or simply draped as described above. The lace popularly used to make lappets had international origins, being created in countries including France, Belgium, Denmark, Ireland, Spain, Britain, Italy, and America, for example.

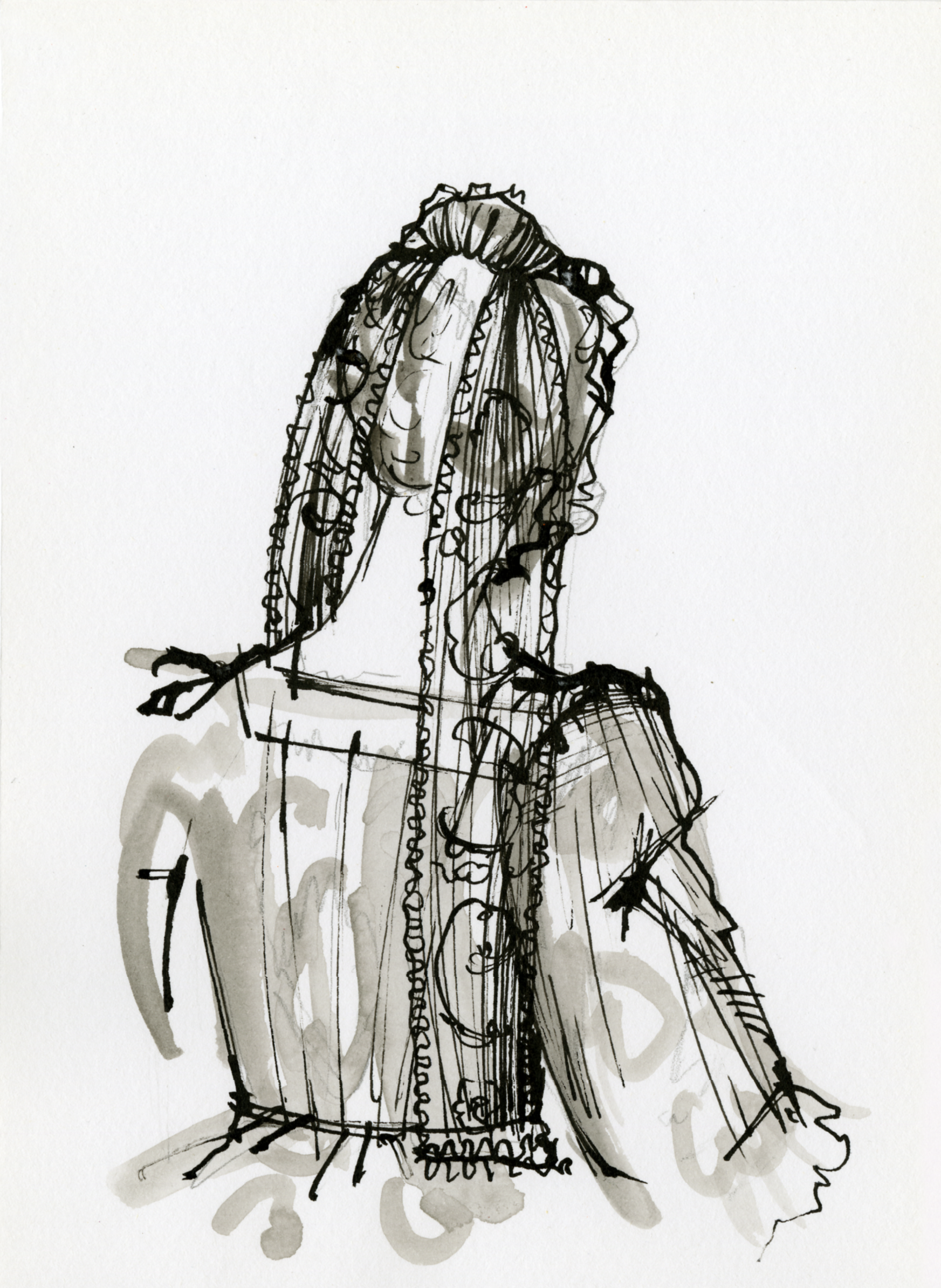
Sketch showing lace lappets hanging from a woman's headdress

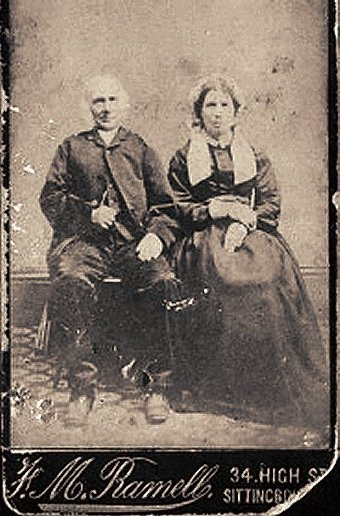
Nineteenth-century British couple. The lady is wearing lappets hanging down on each side of her neck.

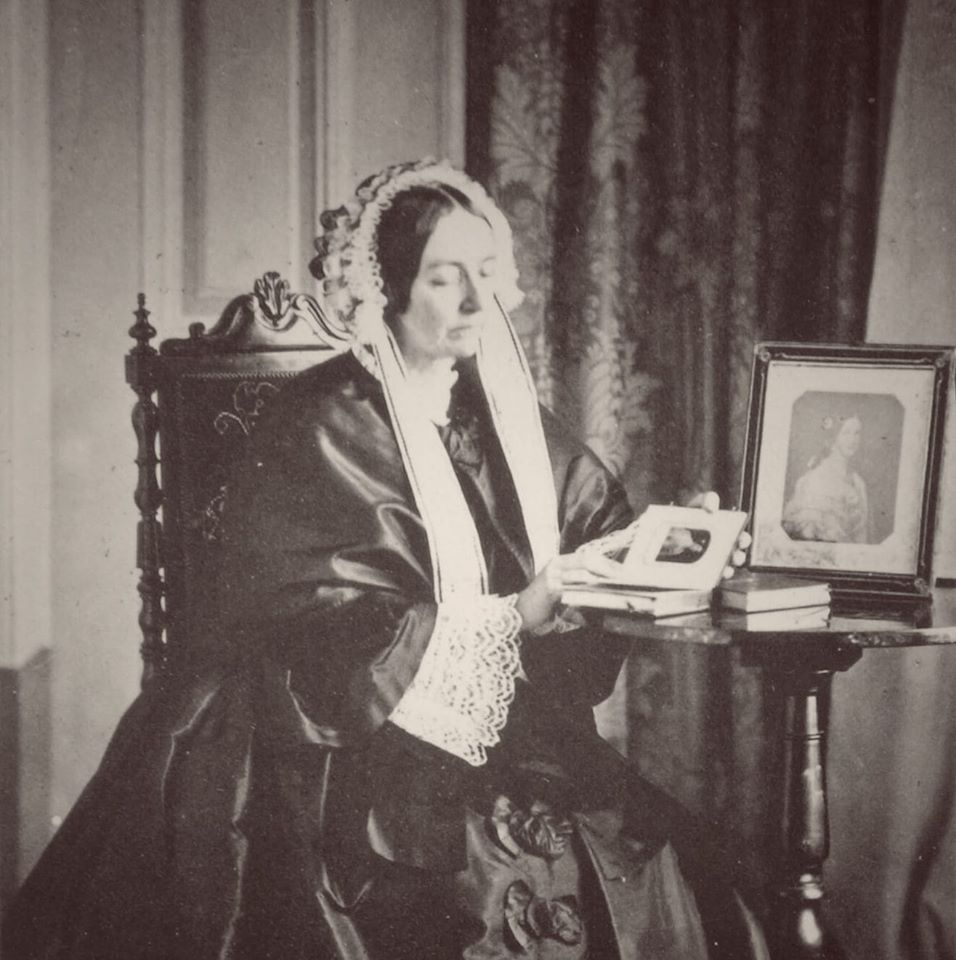
The dowager Empress Amélie of Brazil in 1861

== On episcopal mitres ==
A bishop's mitre with gold lappets

The mitres worn by bishops and abbots of Western liturgical denominations, such as the Catholic Church and the Church of England, have lappets attached to them. Mitre lappets are often lined with red silk.

The lappets are probably a vestige of the ancient Greek headband called a mitra (μίτρα), from which the mitre itself descends. The mitra was a band of cloth tied around the head, the ends of the remaining fabric of which would fall down the back of the neck.

The Latin name for the lappets is infulae, which were originally headbands worn by dignitaries, priests, and others among the ancient Romans. They were generally white.

In the Armenian Apostolic Church, the lappets are not attached directly to the mitre but are attached to the back of the cope.

== On the Papal tiara ==
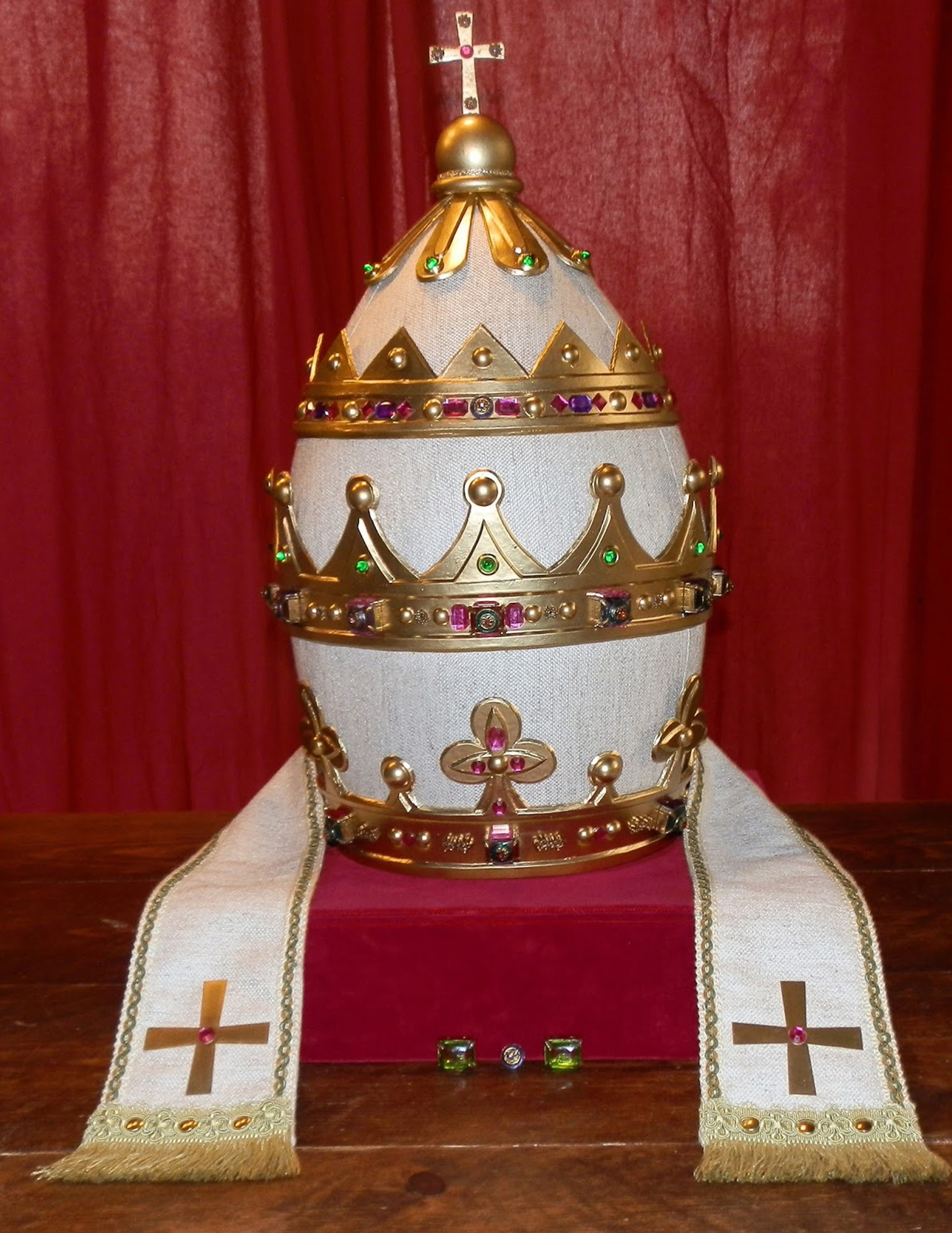
Papal tiara of John XXII

Since early mediæval times each Papal tiara has included two lappets. Their origins remain a mystery, though they are obviously an imitation of the lappets of an episcopal mitre. It has been speculated that lappets first were added to Papal tiaras as a form of sweatband, with inner cloth being used to prevent the wearer from sweating too heavily during Papal ceremonies in hot Roman summers.

The two lappets (Latin: caudæ, literally "tails") at the back of the tiara are first seen in pictures and sculpture of the thirteenth century, but were undoubtedly customary before this. They were black, as is evident from monuments and inventories, and this color was retained into the fifteenth century.

Lappets on the tiara came to be highly decorated with intricate stitching in gold thread. Often a pope who commissioned a tiara, received one as a gift, or had one remodeled for his use had his coat of arms stitched on the lappets. Many later lappets were made of embroidered silk and had lace.

The last Papal tiara worn for a Papal coronation and created for Pope Saint Paul VI in 1963 also had lappets.

== On animals ==
The word is also sometimes used to refer to wattles, flap-like structures that occur on the faces of some animals. For instance, the lappet-faced vulture has lappets of bare flesh on the sides of its head.
