= Perrette Dodée =

Perrette Dodée, known as La Dodée (1644 – September 1679), was a French poisoner. She is known for her involvement in the Affair of the Poisons.

== Life and career ==
Perrette Dodée was the homosexual mistress and associate of the astrologer and poisoner Catherine Trianon. She and her mistress Catherine Trianon had poisoned the husband of La Dodée together, and then lived as "man and wife" in a lesbian relationship.

The couple sold magical objects, such as purportedly magical amulets, magical services such as magical incantations, as well as poisons produced by shepherds and monks in the countryside, which they imported and sold in Paris.

Perrette Dodée and Catherine Trianon were both arrested after having been named as accomplices by La Vosin on 20 May 1679. Upon her arrest, Dodée was described as 35 years of age and "very pretty".

La Dodée was only interrogated once, since she managed to commit suicide in prison by cutting her own throat.

== In fiction ==
La Dodée is a character in a novel by Judith Merkle Riley, The Oracle Glass (1994).
