= Letters close =

Medieval English legal and administrative document

Letters close (Latin: litterae clausae) are a type of obsolete legal document once used by the Pope, the French and British monarchy and by certain officers of government, which is a sealed letter granting a right, monopoly, title, or status to an individual or to some entity such as a corporation. These letters were personal in nature, and were delivered folded and sealed, so that only the recipient could read their contents. This type of letter contrasts with the better-known letters patent.

It was necessary to break the seal to open and read the letter, and so its arrival with the seal intact showed that it had not been intercepted or tampered with. However, once the seal was broken, it could no longer confirm the authenticity of the document.

== Litterae clausae of the Pope ==
Another example of letters close is papal letters close. These often had the leaden papal bulla attached to the letter with a hemp cord that was a sign that the letter contains an order or the fine silk cord which meant a "gift" or a "grace" being announced to the addressee. The cords were often threaded through the letter to keep it folded, with the address written on the dorse (back) of the document (endorsed) for the entrusted deliverers to read.

== In the Kingdom of England ==
In this realm the letters could be issued by the monarch or government. The original charters of Edward the Confessor can be considered to be a form of letters close, as they were delivered wrapped, with the seal hanging down.

This type of letter later developed into the formal business letters that we are familiar with today.

It is thought that the earliest surviving English instance remaining unopened dates to the reign of Henry VIII. In England, these letters are typical of those generated by the developing state bureaucracy. From 1204, copies of English letters close transcribed onto the Close Rolls are extant. However, examples of actual letters close, as opposed to the recorded copies in the Close Rolls, are extremely rare, and most of those exist because King Henry II required the return of some to the government.

Over time, however, as new document series emerged, the scope of the Close Rolls narrowed; and after 1533 their contents consisted solely of copies of private deeds and awards of enclosure, and the like.

== Lordship / Kingdom of Ireland ==
In English-ruled Ireland, letters close were used for a wider variety of grants, as the Irish chancery only produced two series of enrolments: patent and close rolls. Many, but not all, of the letters close issued by the Irish chancery were recorded on the Close Rolls.

== See also ==
- Letters of last resort
- Letterlocking
- Lettres de cachet, a kind of letters close used by the French monarch
