= Close Roll =

Medieval English administrative documents

The Close Rolls (Latin: Rotuli clausi) are an administrative record created in medieval England, Wales, Ireland and the Channel Islands by the royal chancery, in order to preserve a central record of all letters close issued by the chancery in the name of the Crown.

== History ==
The first surviving Close Roll was started in 1204 (in the reign of King John), under the Chancellorship of Hubert Walter, though the actual practice may reach back to 1200, or even before. Copies of the texts of the letters were written on sheets of parchment, which were stitched together into long rolls to form a roll for each year.

== Nature of contents ==
Copies of royal grants of land or money (further transcribed to the Exchequer) made up the earliest contents of the Close Rolls; but the latter soon came to contain much wider matter, exchequer-related material being hived off after 1226 in separate Liberate Rolls. Indeed, in the early 13th century perhaps the bulk of executive action ran via instructions from Chancery to local sheriffs, and was recorded in the Rolls. Over time, however, as new document series emerged, the scope of the Close Rolls narrowed; and after 1533 their contents consisted solely of copies of private deeds and awards of enclosure, and the like.

Until that point, however, the Close Rolls contained a mine of information about late medieval England. Setting aside political and military matters, or the regulation of commerce or of the Angevin Jewry, the origins of representation and parliament can, for example, be followed in the "twelve of the better and more discreet men" of Bristol summoned by King John in 1211, as well as in Close Rolls copies of letters of summons of barons to Parliament. Culturally, a royal gift of a scarlet cloak to a man about to become a knight sheds possible light on the origins of the Knights of the Bath; while the detailed concern of Henry III for the decoration of his treasures, as purchased through the Close Rolls, reveals the extent of his connoisseurship.

== Publication ==
The Close Rolls for the years 1204 to 1227 were published as abbreviated Latin texts (in a near-facsimile of the manuscripts, employing a special "record type" font) by the Record Commission, edited by T. D. Hardy, in 1833 and 1844, in two large folio volumes entitled Rotuli Litterarum Clausarum in Turri Londinensi asservati. Those for the years 1227 to 1272 were published by the Public Record Office between 1902 and 1938, with extended Latin texts, in fourteen volumes entitled Close Rolls, of which eleven were edited by W. H. Stevenson. A "supplementary" volume of additional material for the years 1244–66 appeared in 1975. The post-1272 rolls have not been published as full texts but in calendar form (i.e. as comprehensive English summaries, with all significant details included), under the title Calendar of Close Rolls: 47 volumes appeared between 1900 and 1963, covering the years 1272 to 1509. Those for the reign of Henry VIII (1509–47) have not been independently published, but are incorporated into the series Letters and Papers of the Reign of Henry VIII (published 1862–1932).

The published texts and calendars from 1227 to 1509 have been made available online in a fully searchable form on a "premium" (subscription) section of the digital library British History Online (co-managed by the Institute of Historical Research).

== See also ==
- Pipe Rolls
