= Fontange =

High headdress, or hairstyle worn with this headdress

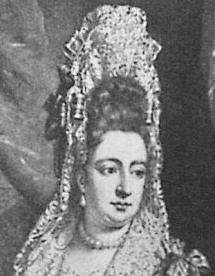
Queen Mary II of England wearing fontanges and a frelange, 1688 (mezzotint made 1690s)

A fontange, or frelange, is a high headdress popular during the turn of the late 17th and early 18th centuries in Europe.

Technically, fontanges are only part of the assembly, referring to the decorative ribbon bows, linen, and lace, and the small linen cap beneath which support the frelange. The frelange was supported by a wire framework called a commode. Along with hair being worn in tight curls of hair worn at the top of the head and the frills described, making up the fontange's elaborate decoration were lappets draping the side of the face or back of the wearer's head.

Further, the term "fontange" is also used by some writers to refer to the associated hairstyle or the combination of headdress and hairstyle. The 'fontange coiffure' was a hairstyle where the front of the hair was worn curled and piled high above the forehead in front of the frelange, which was always higher than the hair. Sometimes the hairstyle was supported by a wire framework called a pallisade.

A surviving example of a frelange headdress with fontanges and commode in situ is that worn by the 1690s fashion doll Lady Clapham. In England, the style was popularly known as a 'top-knot', versions of which were worn by ladies of all ranks, from the Queen downwards to kitchen maids, making it an easy target for satire and criticism.

The fontange is said to be named for the Duchesse de Fontange, a mistress of King Louis XIV of France. One version of the story is that after losing her cap while hunting with the King, the Marquise tied her hair up using a ribbon in a manner that pleased him, and this was imitated by the other ladies at court, subsequently spreading across Europe. What started out as a simple headdress of folded ribbon in the 1680s became, with additional fabric, lace and trimmings, taller and more complex, increasingly difficult to create and wear. Despite its courtly origins, fontanges were forbidden to be worn at French state occasions, although the English court accepted them, with Queen Mary having her portrait painted wearing one.

The word fontange was later used to describe the edging and centre ribbon of a corsage, in about 1850.

== Gallery ==
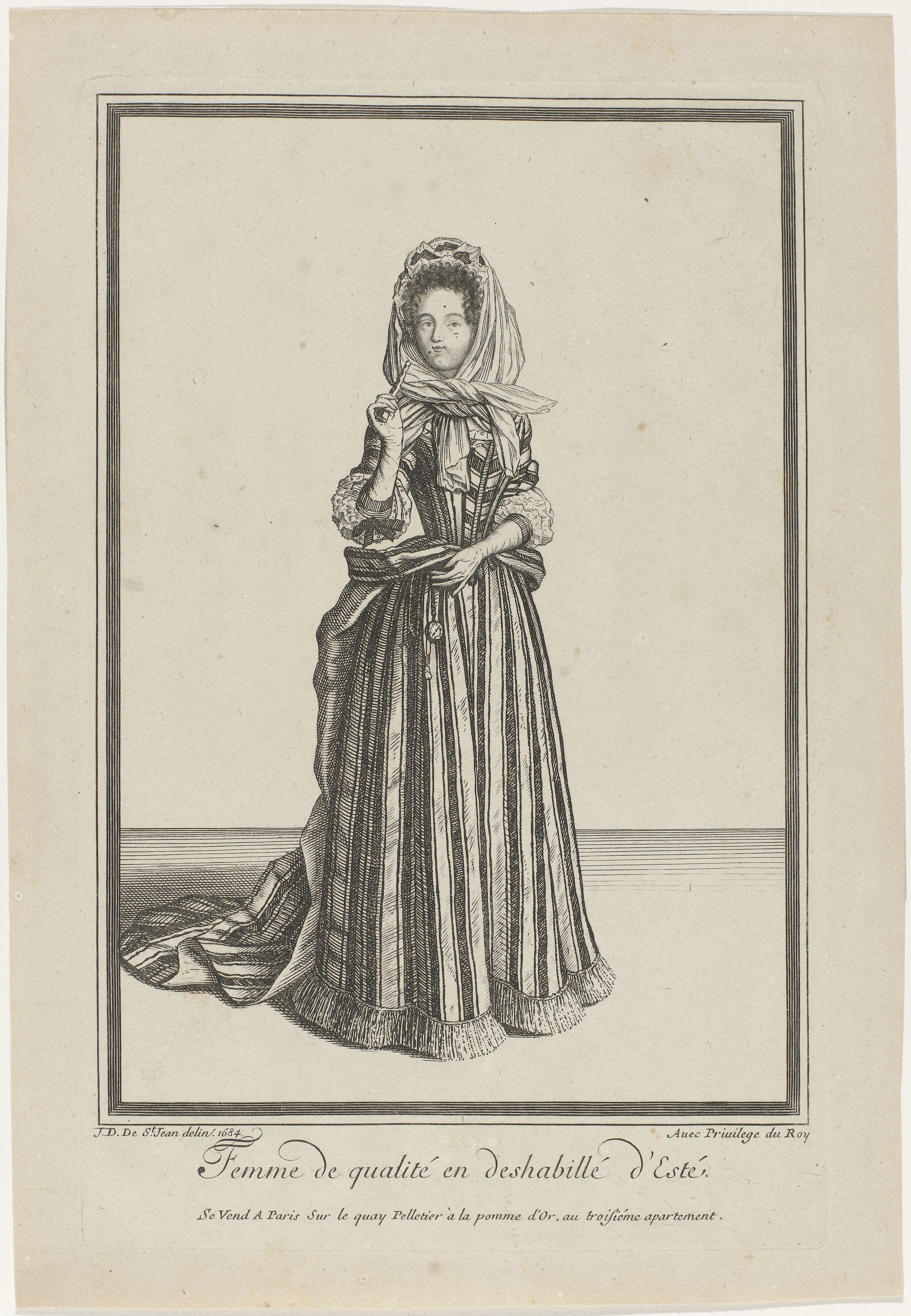
1684

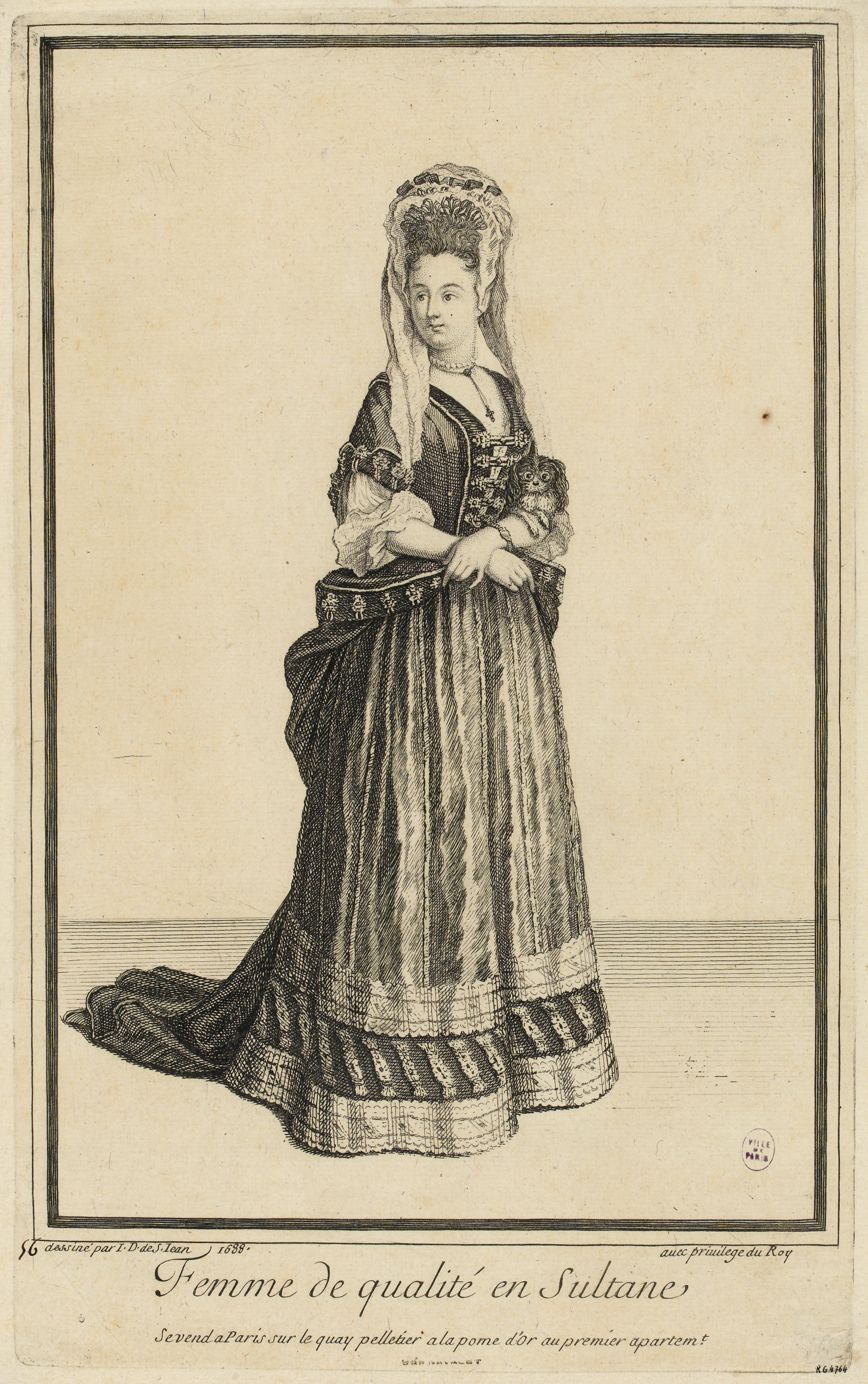
1688

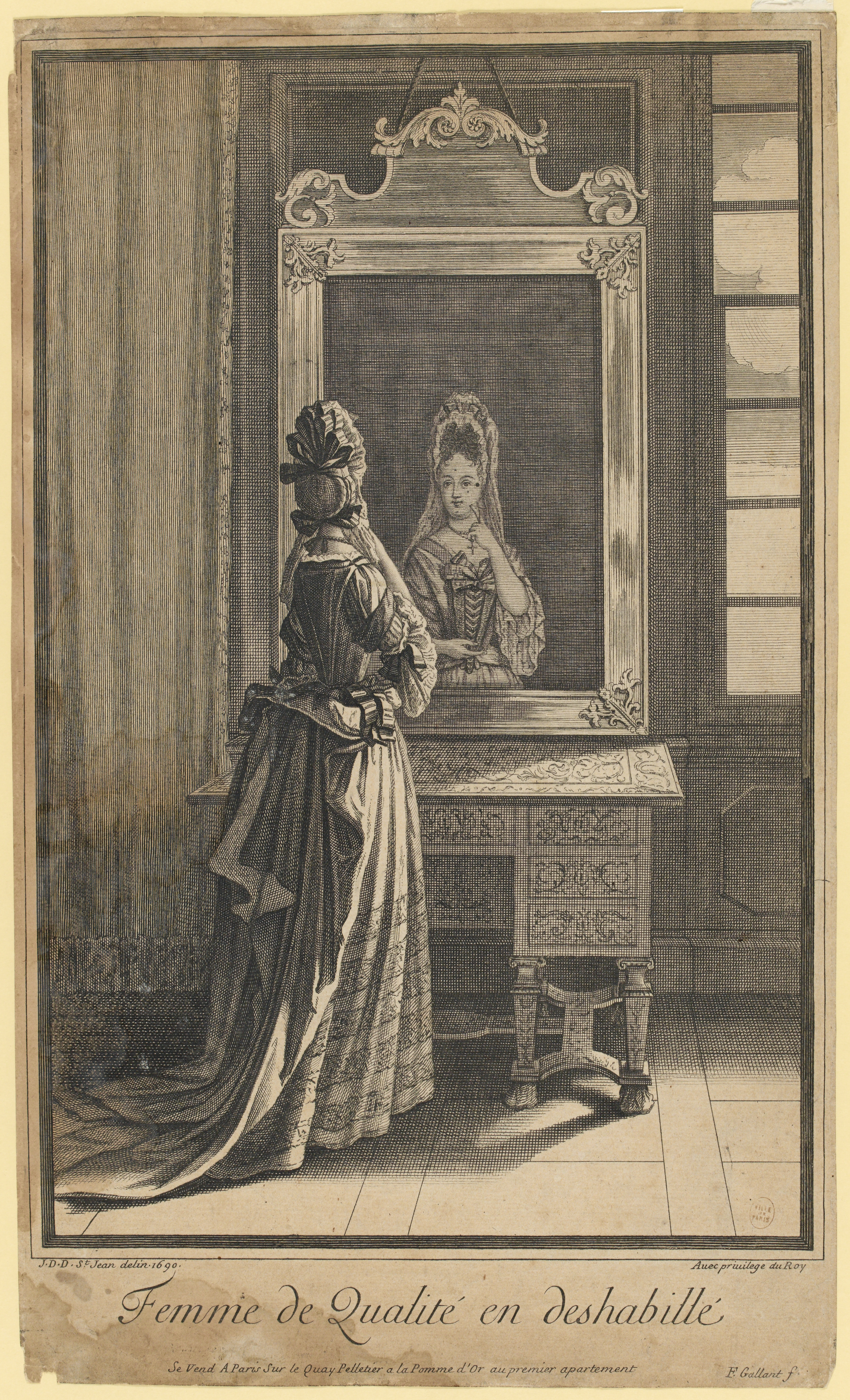
1690

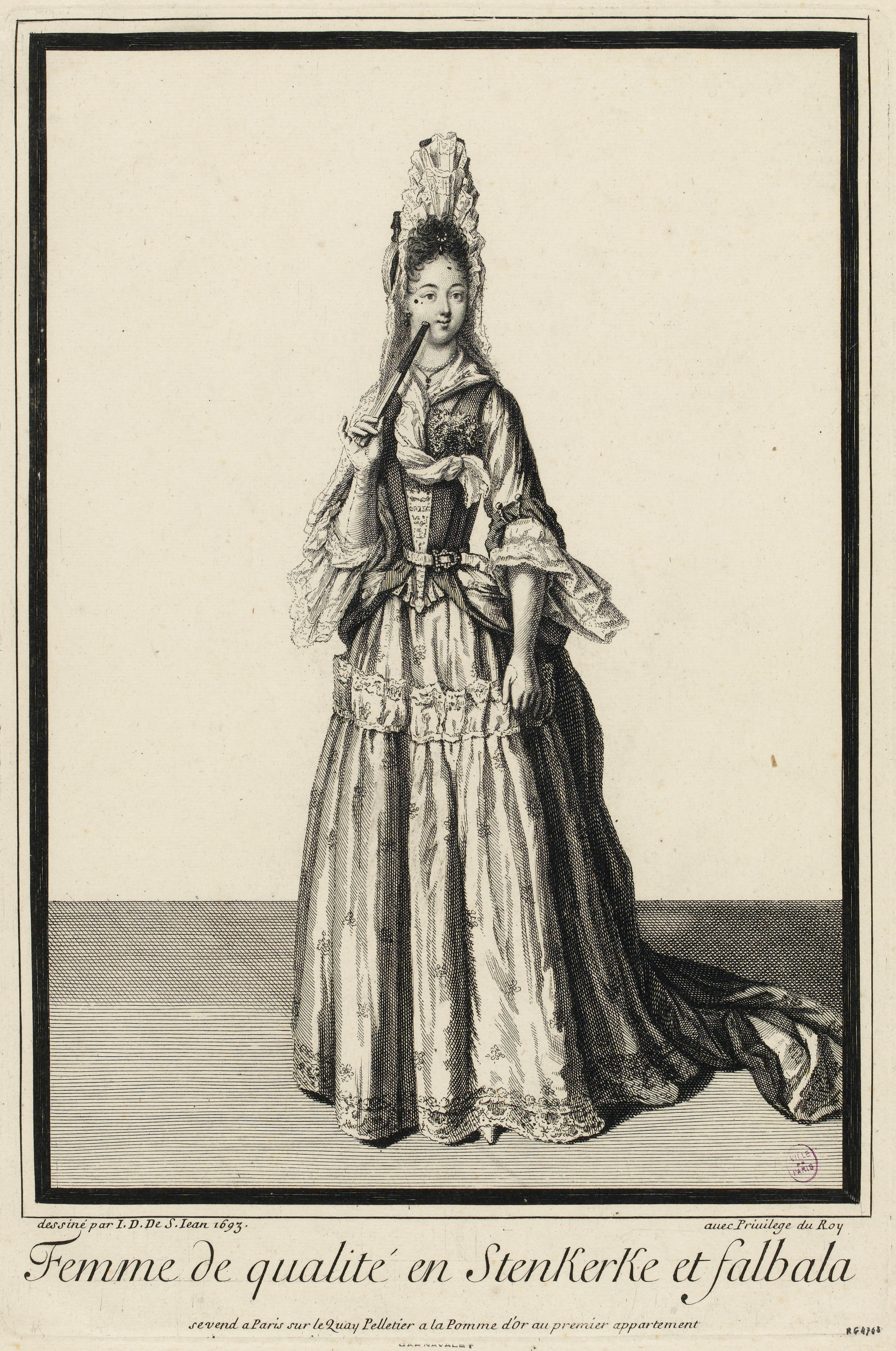
1693

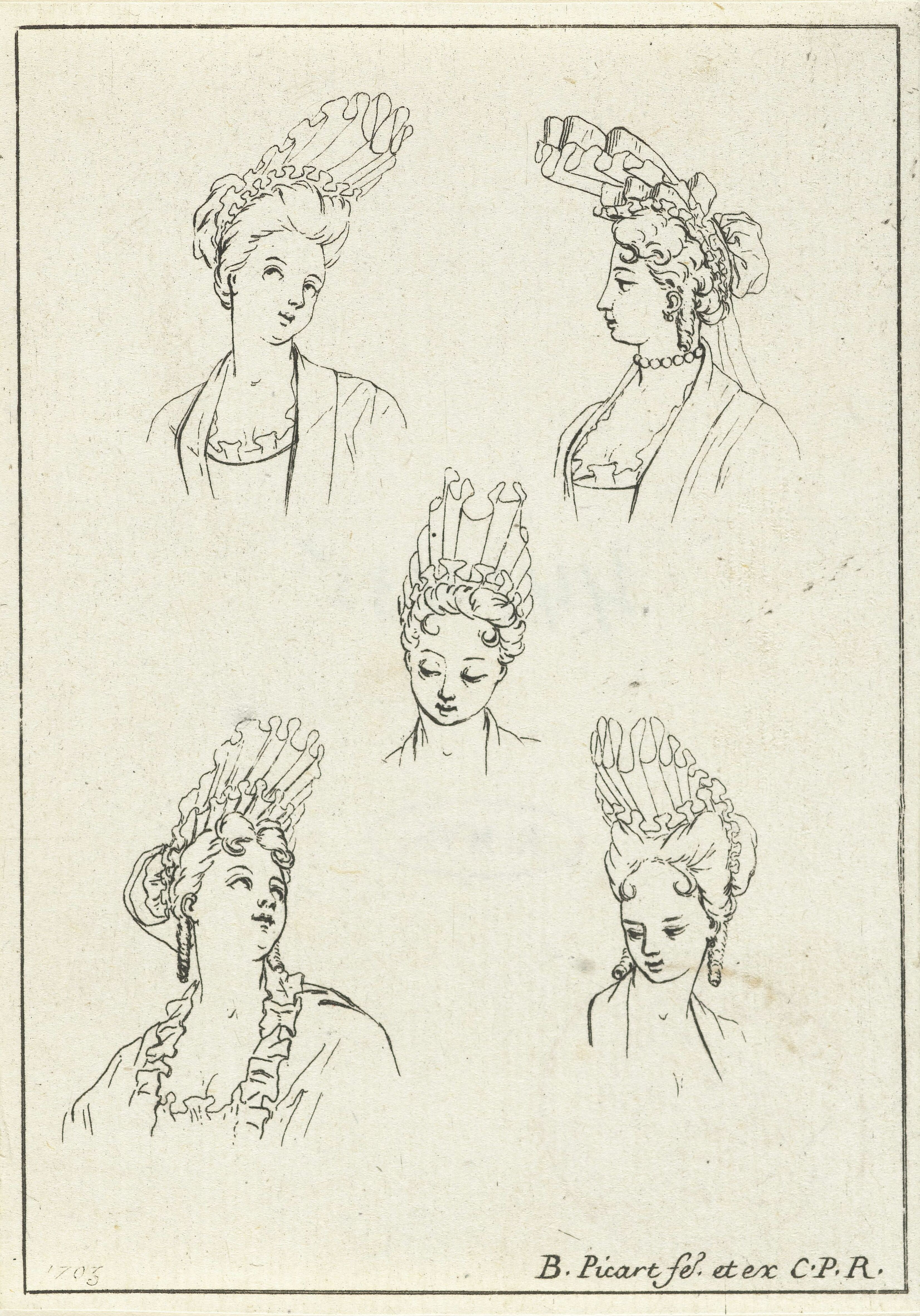
1703

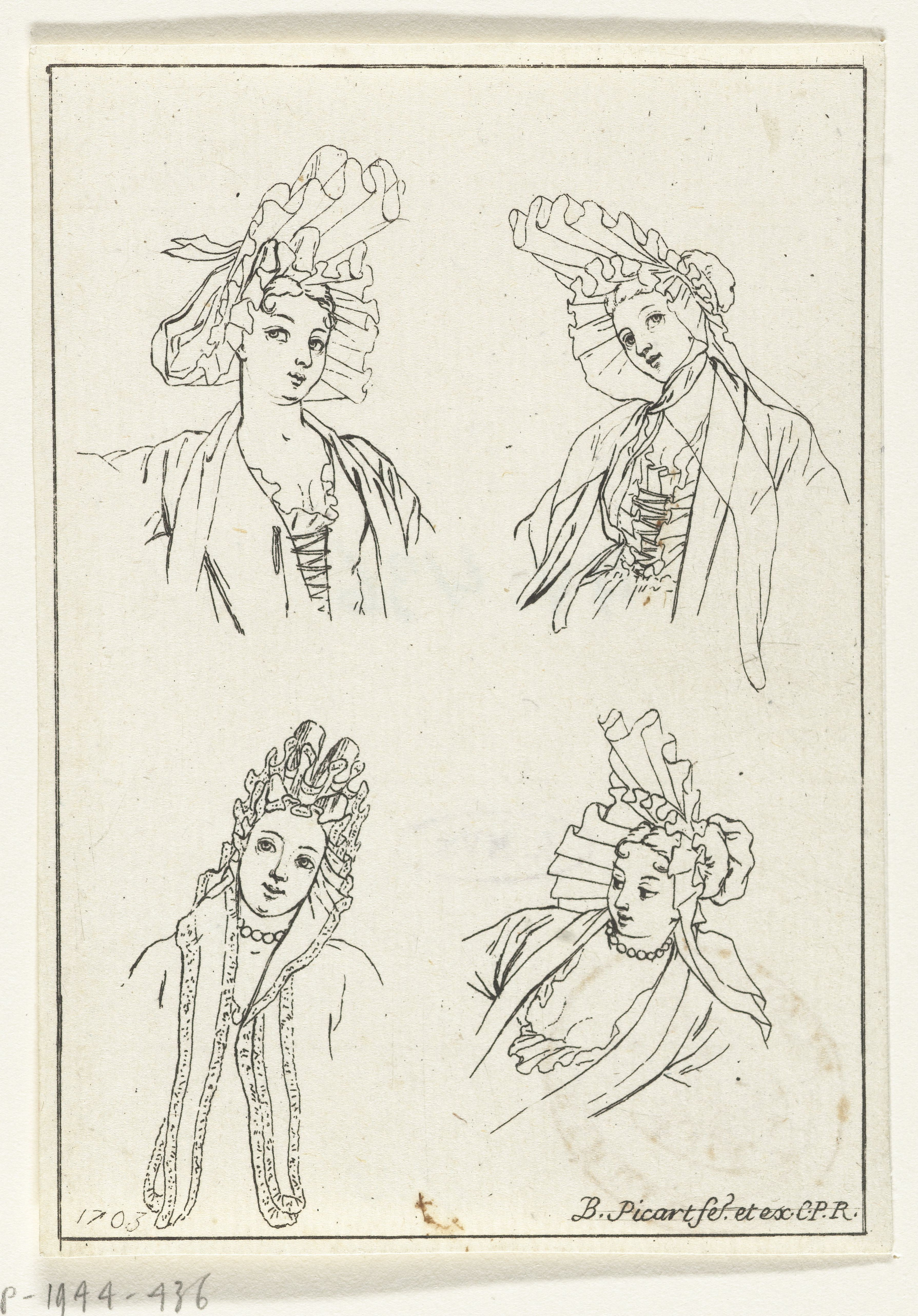
1703

== See also ==
- List of hairstyles
- Ringlet (haircut)
