= Marmanhac =

Commune in Auvergne-Rhône-Alpes, France

- Commune
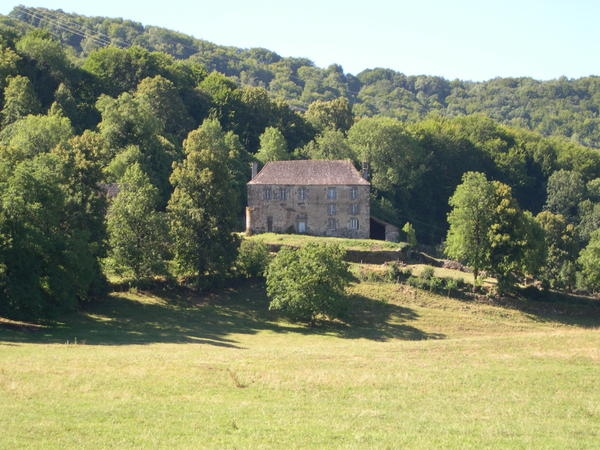
- Chateau of Estang

- Coat of arms
- Location of Marmanhac
- Location within France Location within Auvergne-Rhône-Alpes
- Coordinates: 45°00′16″N 2°28′59″E
- Country: France
- Region: Auvergne-Rhône-Alpes
- Department: Cantal
- Arrondissement: Aurillac
- Canton: Naucelles
- Intercommunality: CA Aurillac Agglomération

Government
  - Mayor (2020–2026): Michel Cosnier
- Area^{1}: 24.24 km^{2} (9.36 sq mi)
- Highest elevation: 971 m (3,186 ft)
- Lowest elevation: 627 m (2,057 ft)
- Population (2023): 667
  - Density: 27.5/km^{2} (71.3/sq mi)
- Time zone: UTC+01:00 (CET)
  - Summer (DST): UTC+02:00 (CEST)
- INSEE/Postal code: 15118 /15250
- ^{1} French Land Register data, which excludes lakes, ponds, glaciers > 1 km^{2} (0.386 sq mi or 247 acres) and river estuaries.

Marmanhac (French pronunciation: [maʁmaɲak]) is a commune in the Cantal department in south-central France.

== Population ==
Historical population
Year	Pop.	±% p.a.
1968	863	—
1975	890	+0.44%
1982	789	−1.71%
1990	749	−0.65%
1999	706	−0.65%
2007	725	+0.33%
2012	711	−0.39%
2017	730	+0.53%
2023	667	−1.49%
Source: INSEE

== See also ==
- Communes of the Cantal department
