= Romani (adventurer) =

Romani (floruit 1714) was a French adventurer involved in the Affair of the Poisons.

Romani was employed as a valet-de-chambre to a lady of the royal court.

He was described as a person credited with great abilities in disguise and persuasion. He was the intended son-in-law of Catherine Monvoisin, who had him engaged to her daughter Marguerite Monvoisin. He did, however, break the engagement after it became known to him that she had been pregnant by another man shortly before their engagement.

He was accused of having conspired with his lover Catherine Monvoisin to assassinate Angélique de Fontanges with poisoned gloves: the plan was for Romani to pose as a merchant of silk and his friend Bertrand as his servant and assistant, and they would offer Fontanges items of poisoned silk. It was further claimed that he planned to assassinate Louis XIV by handing him a petition impregnated with poison. He was pointed out for his participation in this affair by Marguerite Monvoisin, who described him as a poisoner and a master of disguises.

Both Romani and his accomplice Bertrand were sentenced to life imprisonment and sequestration in 1682. The date of his death is not known. He was chained to the wall during his imprisonment, and he is last mentioned in 1714, when one of his fellow prisoners removed his chains out of pity and was punished for this act.
