= Château de Cropières =

Historic castle in Cantal, France

Coordinates: 44.9231°N 2.6606°E

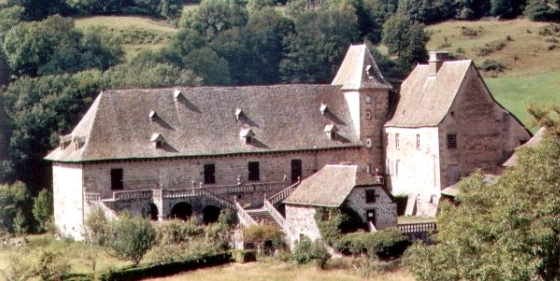
- Interactive map of the Château de Cropières area

The Château de Cropières is an historic castle in Raulhac, Cantal, Auvergne, France.

== History ==
The castle was built in the 13th century.

== Architectural significance ==
It has been listed as an official historical monument by the French Ministry of Culture since 1986.
