= Leontius of Fréjus =

Saint Leontius of Fréjus

Bishop
- Born: late 4th century A.D. Colonia Nemausus, Gallia Narbonensis, Roman Empire
- Died: c 443 A.D. Foro Iulii, Gallia Narbonensis, Roman Empire
- Venerated in: Roman Catholic Church (France), Eastern Orthodox Church
- Major shrine: Fréjus Cathedral, Fréjus, Var, France
- Feast: 1 December

Leontius of Fréjus (French: Léonce de Fréjus) (late 4th century-c. 443) was a bishop of Fréjus, in Provence. He was likely born in the city later to be called Nîmes, towards the end of the fourth century; he died in his episcopal town in 443, according to some authorities. Although others say 488, his period of activity and circle of friends make that unlikely. He is venerated as a saint in the Catholic and Eastern Orthodox churches; his feast day is 1 December.

== Life ==
The date of his episcopal ordination is uncertain, but most likely it took place between the years 400 and 419. Starting from an early date, he, alongside the Blessed Virgin, was considered patron of the cathedral church of Fréjus.

There is reason to believe that he was a brother of Castor, Bishop of Apt, and that consequently like him he was a native of Nîmes. At times he has been mistaken for other persons of the same name, especially for Leontius, Bishop of Arles, who lived at the end of the fifth century. But besides the difference in time, the important events associated with the name of the latter Leontius render the identification impossible.

=== Episcopate ===
The principal occurrence during the episcopate of Leontius of Fréjus was the establishment of Lérins Abbey at the beginning of the fifth century. The name of this bishop is inseparably united to that of Honoratus, the founder of the monastery, who was ordained by Leontius. Leontius seems to have played an important part in the development of the monastic life in the south-east of Gaul. Honoratus called him his superior and his father, whilst John Cassian who governed the numerous religious of the Abbey of St. Victor, Marseille, dedicated most of his "Conferences" to him.

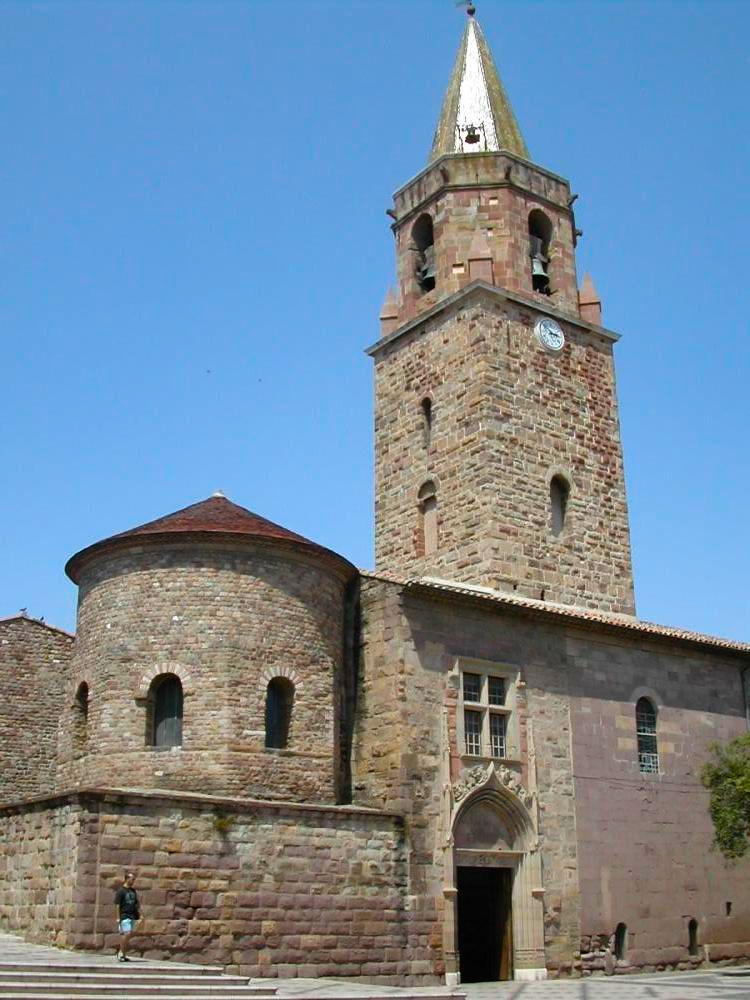
Fréjus Cathedral, dedicated to Leontius

The relations of Lérins Abbey to the diocesan bishop were very cordial. Special privileges were granted by Leontius to Honoratus, with whom he was intimately united in the bonds of friendship. These regulations safeguarded the episcopal dignity while assuring the independence of the monastery. They were confirmed by the Third Council of Arles, and seem to have been the beginning of those immunities which from then on were enjoyed in an increasing degree by the religious communities.

=== Relationship with papacy ===
In 445, Pope Leo I, having quarreled with Hilary, Bishop of Arles, deprived the latter of the prerogatives which gave him a kind of primacy over the district of Vienne Leo bestowed these privileges on a Leontius, bishop of Fréjus. Whether this was the same or a different Leontius is disputed by historians.

Theodore is known to have been succeeded in his episcopate by Theodore in 433, leading some historians to conclude that the recipient of the privileges was a different Leontius, successor of Theodore. Others theorize that Leontius may have left his see in 432 to preach to the Teutons, and returned in 442, dying only in 445 or 448.

Another tradition, making Leontius a martyr, does not seem older than the beginning of the thirteenth century, and merits no credence. Earlier and better authenticated documents give him the title of confessor, which alone is accurate.

Fréjus Cathedral is dedicated to Leontius, and was the seat of the Bishop of Fréjus from the 5th century to 1957, when the Diocese of Fréjus was united with that of Toulon to form the present Diocese of Fréjus-Toulon. The seat of the new diocese is Toulon Cathedral; Fréjus Cathedral is a co-cathedral.
