= Diocese of Fréjus-Toulon =

Catholic diocese in France

Coordinates: 43°07′54″N 5°58′25″E

Diocese of Fréjus–Toulon Dioecesis Foroiuliensis–Tolonensis Diocèse de Fréjus–Toulon

Catholic
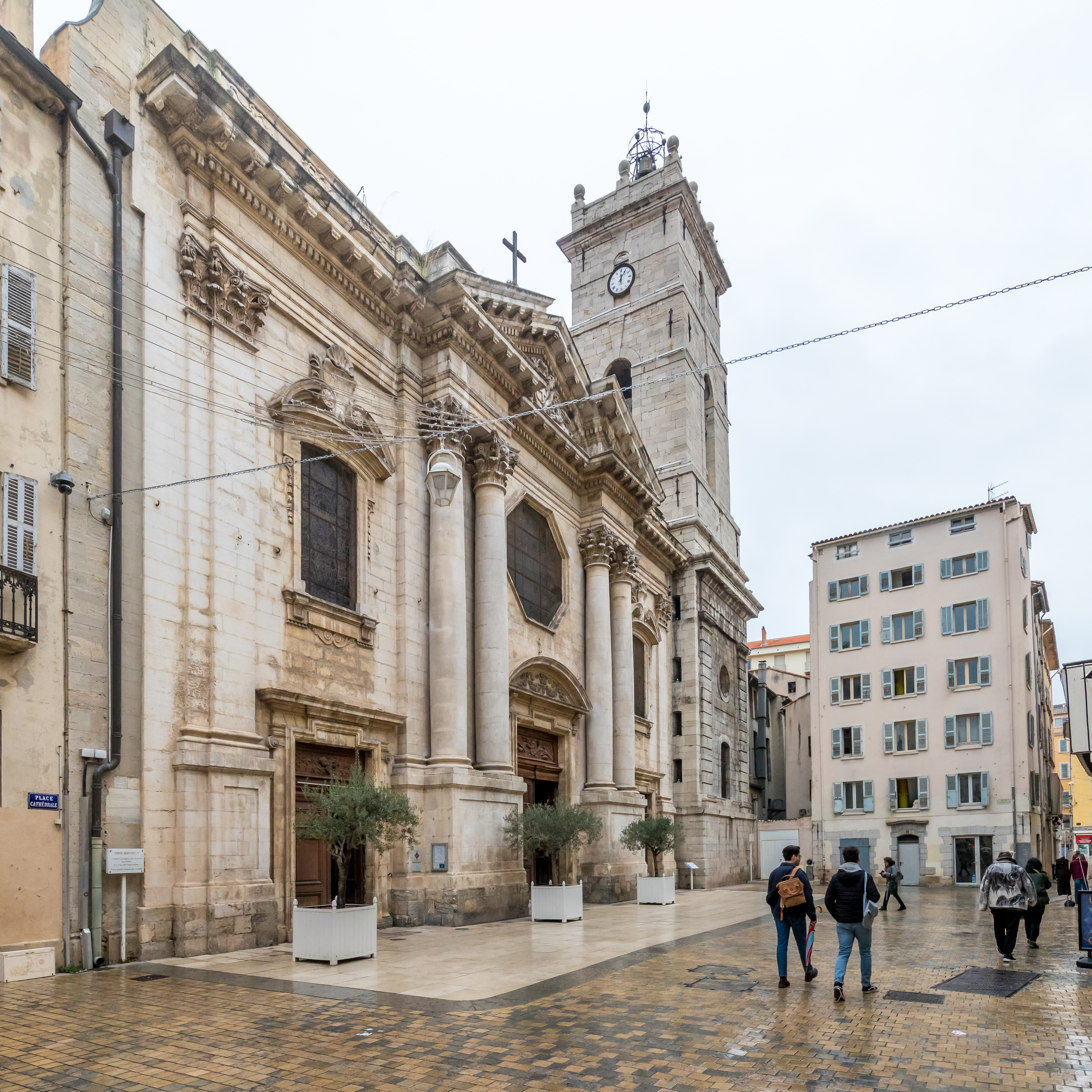
- Toulon Cathedral

Location
- Country: France
- Ecclesiastical province: Marseille
- Metropolitan: Archdiocese of Marseille

Statistics
- Area: 6,022 km^{2} (2,325 sq mi)
- Population: Total; Catholics: (as of 2023); 1,090,200 ▲; 545,100 ▼ (50%)
- Parishes: 90 ▼

Information
- Denomination: Catholic
- Sui iuris church: Latin Church
- Rite: Roman Rite
- Established: 4th Century
- Cathedral: Cathedral of Notre Dame in Toulon
- Co-cathedral: Co-Cathedral of Saint Léonce in Fréjus
- Patron saint: St. Leontius of Fréjus; St. Mary Magdalene
- Secular priests: 210 (Diocesan) ▼73 (Religious Orders) ▼25 Permanent Deacons ▲

Current leadership
- Pope: Leo XIV
- Bishop: François Touvet
- Metropolitan Archbishop: Jean-Marc Aveline

Map

Website
- diocese-frejus-toulon.com

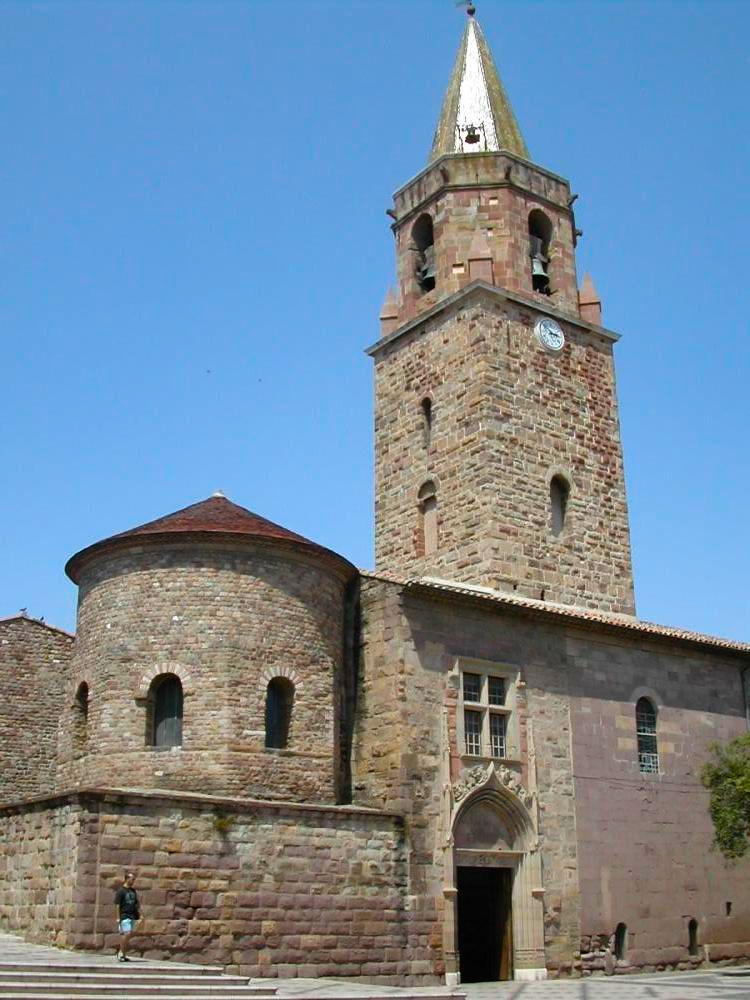
Co-Cathedral of Saint Léonce in Fréjus

The Diocese of Fréjus–Toulon (Latin: Dioecesis Foroiuliensis–Tolonensis; French: Diocèse de Fréjus–Toulon) is a Latin diocese of the Catholic Church in southeastern France on the Mediterranean coast. The present diocese comprises the territory of the ancient Diocese of Fréjus as well as that of the ancient Diocese of Toulon. In 1957 it was renamed the Diocese of Fréjus–Toulon.

Under the Civil Constitution of the Clergy the département of Var constituted a diocese, absorbing the former ancient dioceses of Toulon, Fréjus, Grasse and Vence. It was suppressed by the Concordat of 1801, re-established ineffectually by that of 1817, and definitively established in 1823, when its assigned territory comprised once more the whole département of Var. A Papal Brief of 1852 authorized the bishop to assume the title of Bishop of Fréjus and Toulon. It was and has remained a suffragan of the Archdiocese of Aix-en-Provence and Arles,

The arrondissement of Grasse until 1860 belonged to the département of Var, when it was annexed to that of the Alpes-Maritimes. In 1886 it was separated from Fréjus and attached to the Diocese of Nice.

Since 7 January 2025, the Bishop of Fréjus–Toulon has been Bishop François Touvet.

== History ==
Christianity would seem to have been introduced into Fréjus in the fourth century. In 374 a certain Acceptus, who had just been elected to the See of Fréjus, falsely declared himself guilty of some crimes in order to rid himself of the episcopal dignity. At the Council of Valence, which met in July of 374, he begged the Church to name another in his place. The Council decided that his actions made it inappropriate for him to be consecrated a bishop.

Fréjus was completely destroyed by the Saracens in the early tenth century. It was Bishop Riculfus who began the reconstruction of the cathedral.

The following are named among the bishops of this see:

- Raymond Berengarius (1235–1248), who arranged the marriage of Beatrice, daughter of the Count of Provence, with Charles of Anjou
- Jacques d'Euse (1300–1310), preceptor of St. Louis of Toulouse, and later pope under the name of John XXII
- Cardinal Nicolò Fieschi (1495–1524), who at the time of his death was dean of the Sacred College (in 1524, from 20 May to 14 June)
- André-Hercule de Fleury (1698–1715).

== Bishops ==
=== To 1000 ===
- before 419 – 433: Leontius
- 433–455: Theodorus
- 463–465: Asterius
- 475?: Auxilius
- 484?–506: Victorinus
- ? 524: Joannes (Jean, John)
- 527–529: Lupercianus
- 541: Dionysius (Didier)
- 549–554: Expectatus
- 582: Epiphanius
- 636: Martin
- ...
- 909–911: Benedict
- 949–952: Gontar
- 973–1000?: Riculfus

=== 1000 to 1300 ===
- 1010–1044: Gaucelme
- 1044–1091: Bertrand
- 1091–1131: Berenger
- 1131–1145: Bertrand II.
- 1154–1157: Pierre de Montlaur
- 1166–1198: Fredol d'Anduze
- 1198–1202: Guillaume du Pont
- 1203–1206: Raimond de Capella
- 1206–1212: Bermond Cornut
- 1212?–1215: Raimond de Puyricard
- 1220: Olivier
- 1224–1233?: Bertrand III. de Favas
- 1235–1248: Raimond Berenguer
- 1248–1264: Bertrand de Saint-Martin
- 1264–1266: Pierre de Camaret
- 1267–1280?: Guillaume de la Fonte
- 1280?–1299: Bertrand V. Comarque

=== 1300 to 1500 ===
- 1300–1310: Jacques Arnaud Duèze, later Pope John XXII
- 1318–1318: Bertrand VI. d'Aimini
- 1318–1340: Barthélémy Grassi
- 1340–1343: Jean d'Arpadelle
- 4 June 1343 – 14 March 1346: Guillaume d'Aubussac
- 7 April 1346 – 1348: Pierre Alamanni
- 1348: Pierre du Pin (electus: transferred to Viterbo 10 December 1348)
- 2 March 1349 – 9 June 1360: Guillaume Amici (administrator) (also Bishop of Apt and Bishop of Chartres)
- 1360–1361: Pierre Artaudi
- 1361–1364: Guillaume de Ruffec
- 1364–1371: Raimond Daconis
- 1371–1385: Bertrand de Villemus
- 1385: Emanuel
- 3 August 1385 – 13 April 1405: Louis de Bouillac
- 9 September 1409 – 1 February 1422: Gilles Le Jeune
- 1422–1449?: Jean Bélard
- 1449–1452: Jacques Juvénal des Ursins
- 1452–1453: Jacques Séguin
- 1453–1455: Guillaume d'Estaing
- 1455–1462: Jean du Bellay
- 1462–1472: Léon Guérinet
- 1472: Réginald d'Angline
- 1472–1485: Urbano Fieschi (senior)
- 15 March 1485 – 1487: Niccolò Fieschi (transferred to Agde)
- 17 September 1487 – 26 November 1494: Rostan d'Ancesune (transferred to Embrun)
- 25 February 1495 – 1511: Niccolò Fieschi

=== 1500 to 1800 ===
Under Louis XIV, who enjoyed the right to nominate bishops to all French sees with the exception of Metz, Verdun and Toul, the See of Fréjus was often an early stepping-stone for careers of clerics whose ambitions lay elsewhere.

- 5 November 1511 – 23 January 1523: Urbano Fieschi (junior)
  nephew of Cardinal Niccolò Fieschi
- 1524 – 15 June 1424: Cardinal Niccolò Fieschi
- 1524–1534: Franciot des Ursins
- 1525–1564: Léon des Ursins
- 1565–1579: Bertrand de Romans
- 1579–1591: François de Bouliers
- 1591–1599?: Gérard Bellenger
- 1599–1637: Barthélémy Camelin
- 1637–1654: Pierre Camelin
- 1658–1674: Zongo Ondedei
- 1676–1678: Antoine de Clermont
- 1679–1680: Louis d'Anglure de Bourlemont
- 1681–1697: Luc d'Aquin
- 1697–1699: Louis d'Aquin
- 1699–1715: André-Hercule de Fleury
- 1715–1739: Pierre de Castellane
- 1739–1765: Martin du Bellay
- 1766–1801: Emmanuel de Bausset
  - 1791–1799: Jean-Joseph Rigouard (Constitutional Bishop of Var)

=== From 1800 ===
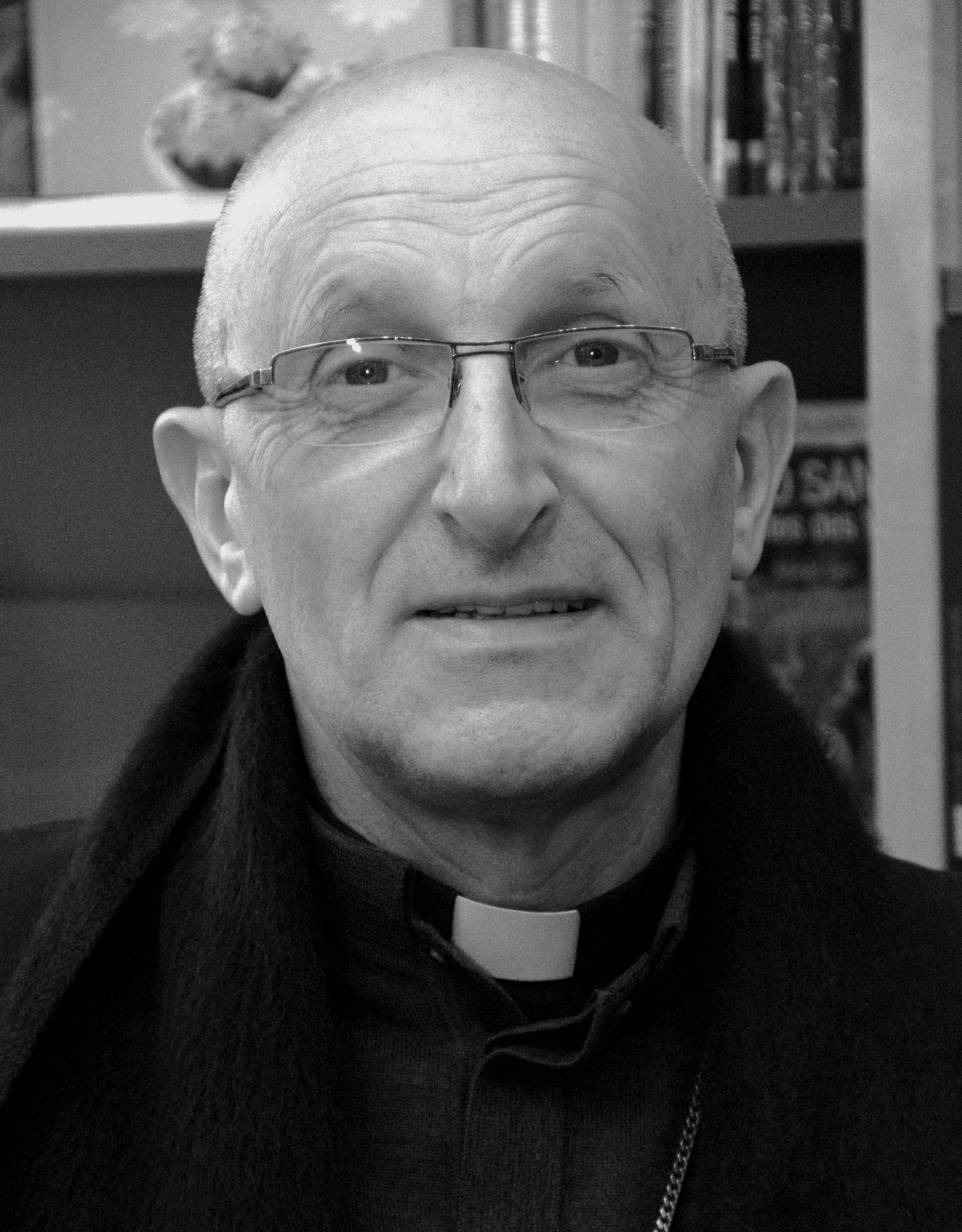
Bishop Dominique Marie Jean Rey

- Suppressed 1801–1822
- Charles-Alexandre de Richery (8 August 1817 – 8 February 1829) (also Archbishop of Aix)
- Louis-Charles-Jean-Baptiste Michel (16 April 1829 – 22 February 1845)
- Casimir-Alexis-Joseph Wicart (29 March 1845 – 3 July 1855) (also Bishop of Laval)
- Joseph-Antoine-Henri Jordany (6 November 1855 – March 1876)
- Joseph-Sébastien-Ferdinand Terris (17 March 1876 – 8 April 1885)
- Fédéric-Henri Oury (2 March 1886 – 3 June 1890) (also Bishop of Dijon)
- Eudoxe-Irénée-Edouard Mignot (3 June 1890 – 7 December 1899) (auch Archbishop of Albi)
- Aloys-Joseph-Eugène Arnaud (7 December 1899 – 17 June 1905)
- Félix-Adolphe-Camille-Jean-Baptiste Guillibert (21 February 1906 – 31 May 1926)
- Auguste-Joseph-Marie Simeone (30 July 1926 – 22 October 1940)
- Auguste Joseph Gaudel (24 September 1941 – 30 June 1960)
- Henri-Louis-Marie Mazerat (30 July 1960 – 11 December 1961) (also Bishop of Angers)
- Gilles-Henri-Alexis Barthe (4 May 1962 – 8 February 1983)
- Joseph Théophile Louis Marie Madec (8 February 1983 – 16 May 2000)
- Dominique Rey (16 May 2000 – 7 January 2025)
- François Touvet (10 December 2023 (as coadjutor), 7 January 2025 – present)

== Saints ==
The Island of Lérins, well known as the site of the celebrated monastery founded there in 410, was sold in 1859 by the bishop of Fréjus to an English purchaser. A number of the saints of Lérins are especially honoured in the diocese. Among them are Sts. Honoratus, Caesarius, Hilary, and Virgilius, all of whom became archbishop of Arles; Quinidius, Bishop of Vaison; Valerius, Bishop of Nice; Maximus, Bishop of Riez; Veranus and Lambertus, both Bishop of Vence; Vincent of Lérins, author of the Commonitorium, and his brother Lupus, Bishop of Troyes; Agricola, Bishop of Avignon; Aigulphus and Porcarius, martyrs; St. Tropesius, martyr during the persecution of Emperor Nero; St. Louis of Toulouse (1274–1297), a native of Brignoles, in the Diocese of Toulon, and later Archbishop of Toulouse; and the virgin St. Roseline, prioress of the monastery of La Celle-Roubaud, who died in 1329, and whose shrine, situated at Les Arcs near Draguignan, has been for six centuries a place of pilgrimage, are likewise especially honoured in the diocese.

The sojourn in 1482 of St. Francis of Paola at Bormes and at Fréjus, where he caused the cessation of the plague, made a lasting impression.

== See also ==
- Catholic Church in France

== Bibliography ==
=== Reference works ===
- E. Clouzot and M. Prou, ed. (1923). Recueil des historiens de la France: Pouillés (in French and Latin). Vol. Tome 8. Paris: Imprimerie Nationale. pp. 63 ff.
- Gams, Pius Bonifatius (1873). Series episcoporum Ecclesiae catholicae: quotquot innotuerunt a beato Petro apostolo. Ratisbon: Typis et Sumptibus Georgii Josephi Manz. pp. 551–552. (Use with caution; obsolete)
- Eubel, Conradus, ed. (1913). Hierarchia catholica, Tomus 1 (second ed.). Münster: Libreria Regensbergiana. (in Latin) p. 252.
- Eubel, Conradus, ed. (1914). Hierarchia catholica, Tomus 2 (second ed.). Münster: Libreria Regensbergiana. (in Latin) p. 155.
- Eubel, Conradus; Gulik, Guilelmus, eds. (1923). Hierarchia catholica, Tomus 3 (second ed.). Münster: Libreria Regensbergiana. p. 197-198.
- Gauchat, Patritius (Patrice) (1935). Hierarchia catholica IV (1592-1667). Münster: Libraria Regensbergiana. pp. 189.
- Ritzler, Remigius; Sefrin, Pirminus (1952). Hierarchia catholica medii et recentis aevi V (1667-1730). Patavii: Messagero di S. Antonio. pp. 203–204.
- Ritzler, Remigius; Sefrin, Pirminus (1958). Hierarchia catholica medii et recentis aevi VI (1730-1799). Patavii: Messagero di S. Antonio. p. 218.

=== Studies ===
- Albanés, Joseph Hyacinthe; Ulysse Chevalier (1899). Gallia christiana novissima: Aix, Apt, Fréjus, Gap, Riez et Sisteron (in Latin). Montbéliard: Société anonyme d'imprimerie montbéliardaise.
- Duchesne, Louis (1907). Fastes épiscopaux de l'ancienne Gaule: I. Provinces du Sud-Est. Paris: Fontemoing. pp. 285–286. second edition (in French)
- Espitalier, Hippolyte (1894). Évêques de Fréjus, du VI au XIII siècle (in French). Draguignan: C. et A Latil.
- Espitalier, Hippolyte (1898). Les évêques de Fréjus, du XIIIe à la fin du XVIIIe siècle (in French). Draguignan: Latel.
- Espitalier, Hippolyte (1904). Les évêques de Fréjus, au XIX siècle (in French). Fréjus: Cisson.
- Goettelmann, Paul Augustus (1933). The Baptistry of Fréjus: A Restoration Based on the Architectural and Historical Evidence. Washington DC USA: Catholic University of America.
- Font-Réaulx, J. de. La carte et la structure: Les évéques de Fréjus du VIe au XIIIe siècle
- Teissier, Octave (1899). La Cathédrale de Fréjus (in French). Draguignan: C. et A. Latil.
