= Saint Honorat =

Saint Honorat or Saint-Honorat may refer to

- Saint Honoratus, Archbishop of Arles
- Île Saint-Honorat, the second largest of the Lérins Islands, in France
- Lérins Abbey, also called St Honorat of Lerins
- List of Empire ships (F)#Empire Ford, a 325 GRT coaster renamed Saint Honorat
