= Coadjutor bishop =

High-ranking member of the Christian clergy

A coadjutor bishop (or bishop coadjutor) ("co-assister" in Latin) is a bishop in the Latin Catholic, Anglican and (historically) Eastern Orthodox churches whose main role is to assist the diocesan bishop in administering the diocese.

The coadjutor automatically succeeds the diocesan bishop when he retires, dies or leaves office for another reason. In the Latin Catholic Church, the coadjutor is a bishop appointed by the pope in Rome. He is considered the principal deputy administrator of the diocese.

In the Eastern Catholic churches, the adjutor may be appointed by the pope or by the church itself. Within the Anglican Communion, a diocesan committee appoints the coadjutor.

== Latin Church ==
=== Role of coadjutor ===
In the Latin Church, the pope may appoint a bishop as coadjutor to help the diocesan bishop govern the diocese. Being himself a bishop, the coadjutor can substitute for the diocesan bishop in his absence (Canon 403§3).

Under canon law, the coadjutor must serve as the vicar general, the principal deputy administrator of the diocese. The diocesan bishop must "entrust to him [coadjutor] before others" in acts that require a special mandate (Canon 406§1). If the episcopal see is an archdiocese, the coadjutor is appointed as an archbishop.

In modern church practice, the pope can appoint a coadjutor to assist a bishop who needs help due to declining health. The coadjutor can also assist a bishop nearing retirement. The objective is to have continuity of leadership in the diocese and avoid an unexpected vacancy in the position of bishop. For example, Pope Benedict XVI named Bishop Dennis Schnurr as coadjutor archbishop of the Archdiocese of Cincinnati in Ohio in the United States in October 2008 to assist Archbishop Daniel Pilarczyk. When Pilarczyk retired in December 2009, Schnurr automatically became the diocesan archbishop without any ceremony.

The Second Vatican Council issued an instruction that "in order to provide for the greatest possible present and future good of the diocese, the diocesan bishop and his coadjutor should not fail to consult with each other on matters of great importance".

In some situations, the pope may appoint a coadjutor to override the diocesan bishop in certain matters. These might include a public scandal or financial mismanagement of the diocese. The problems are serious, but not bad enough for the pope to remove the diocesan bishop. For example, in 2023, Pope Francis appointed Bishop François Touvet as coadjutor of the Diocese of Fréjus-Toulon in France to assist the elderly Bishop Dominique Rey. The pope gave Touvet special powers to oversee the preparation of seminarians and the financial management in the diocese. The Vatican had suspended the ordination of priests in the diocese in 2022.

In one instance, the pope appointed a coadjutor to a church that was not a diocese. In 2002, Pope John Paul II named the Reverend Fernando Arêas Rifan as coadjutor of the Personal Apostolic Administration of Saint John Mary Vianney in Brazil. The pope took this action as part of the reconciliation agreement with the former Priestly Union of Saint John Mary Vianney that had broken with the Catholic Church.

=== Right of succession ===
The 1983 Code of Canon Law of the Latin Church stipulates that all coadjutors have the right of succession. The code also allows the pope to appoint an auxiliary bishop to a diocese "with special faculties [powers]", but without the right of succession.

For example, in 1986, Pope John Paul II appointed the Reverend Donald Wuerl as an auxiliary bishop in the Archdiocese of Seattle in Washington State in the United States with "special powers" to override Archbishop Raymond Hunthausen. The pope was unhappy with Hunthausen's handling of LGBTQ relations and other morality issues.

Under the old 1917 Code of Canon Law, the pope did not have to name a coadjutor cum jure succesionis ("with the right of succession"). In practice, popes sometimes appointed coadjutors without the right of succession. These coadjutors usually served in large archdioceses. They might hold other important posts within the Catholic Church, or might be auxiliary bishops that the pope wanted to honor with the title of coadjutor.

For example, Pope Paul VI in 1965 appointed Auxiliary Bishop John J. Maguire as coadjutor of the Archdiocese of New York, one of the largest archdioceses in the United States, to assist Cardinal Francis Spellman. However, the pope denied Maguire the right to succeed Spellman, who died in 1967.

== Eastern Catholic Churches ==
Some sui juris Eastern Catholic Churches also appoint coadjutors. However, the selection process differs among the churches.

- The patriarchal or major archiepiscopal synods of the larger sui juris ritual churches typically elect their coadjutors, with papal assent.
- The pope typically appoints the coadjutors in the smaller sui juris ritual churches.

The coadjutor of an eparchy, archeparchy, or metropolis has the respective status of an eparch, archeparch, or metropolitan.

== Anglican communion ==
In some provinces of the Anglican Communion, a bishop coadjutor (the form usually used) is a bishop elected or appointed to follow the current diocesan bishop upon the incumbent's death or retirement.

In the Episcopal Church in the United States of America, when a diocesan bishop announces their intent to retire, they normally call for a special diocesan convention to elect a bishop coadjutor. The bishop coadjutor and diocesan bishop then serve jointly until the diocesan bishop dies or retires. The coadjutor automatically becomes the diocesan bishop.

A "bishop suffragan" is elected to assist the diocesan bishop under his direction, but without the inherent right of succession.

There have been bishops coadjutor in the Anglican Church of Australia without the right of succession to the diocesan see.

== See also ==
- Titular see
