= Caprasius of Lérins =

French hermit

Saint Caprasius
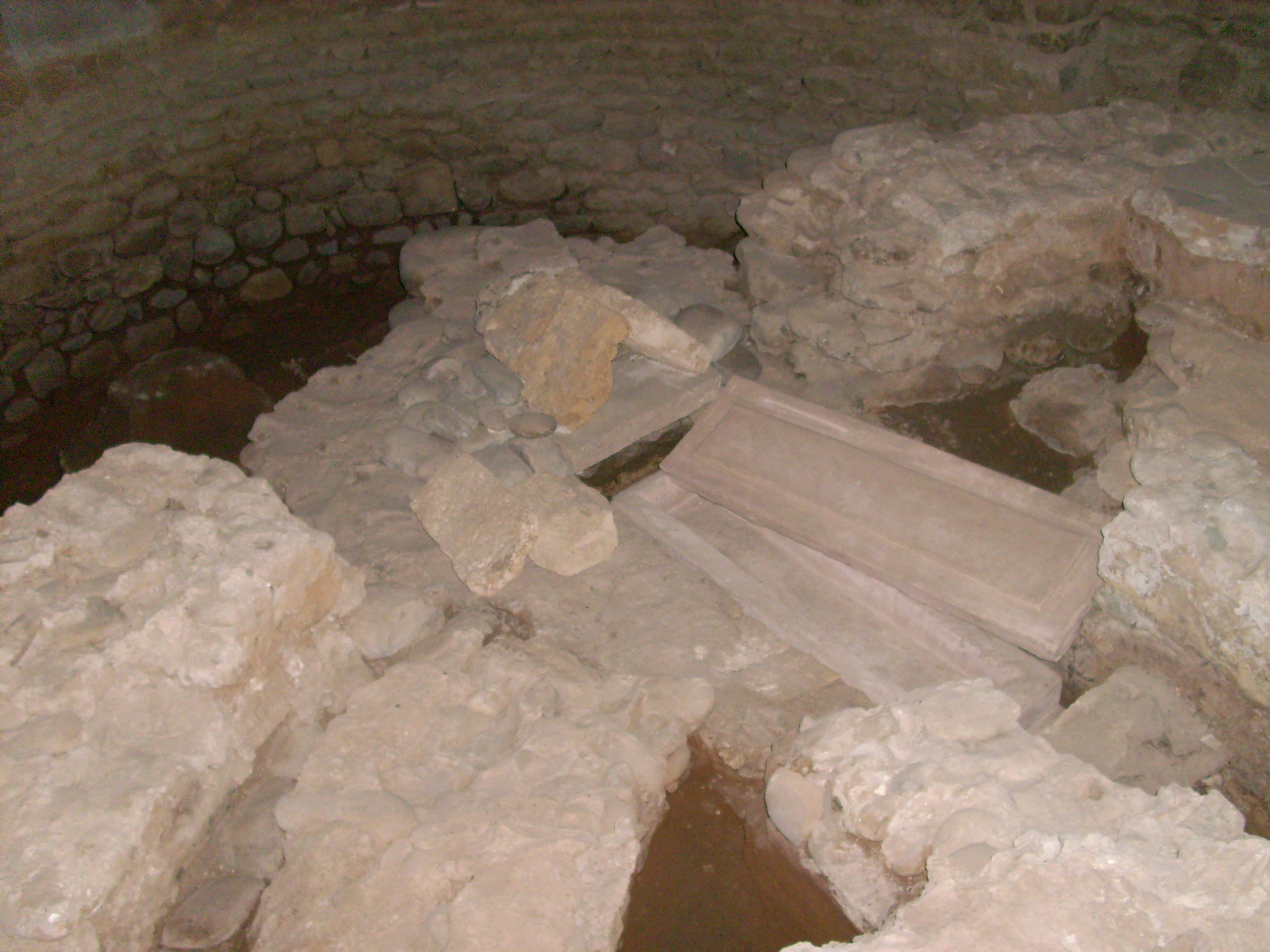

Hermit
- Died: 430 AD
- Venerated in: Roman Catholic Church; Eastern Orthodox Church
- Feast: June 1

Caprasius, sometimes Caprasius of Lérins (French: Caprais; died 430), was a hermit who lived in Lérins, Provence.

Caprasius was born sometime in the fourth century in Gaul. He came from a rich and distinguished family, but gave up great worldly prospects to live as a hermit on the Îles de Lérins in the Mediterranean off the coast of southern Gaul. He was joined by Honoratus and Honoratus' brother Venantius, two youths who wished to become hermits as well. The three decided to go on pilgrimage to the Holy Land and visit the holy places of Palestine and the lavras of Syria and Egypt. However, Venantius died at Methoni, Messenia, and Caprasius and Honoratus cut short their voyage.

Caprasius and Honoratus returned to Gaul, where they established themselves in the hills near Fréjus before returning to Lérins, where they wished to imitate the Desert Fathers. There they were joined by many others, and the hermits were inspired by the monastic rule of Pachomius the Great. Lérins Abbey grew up on the site of this community. According to one scholar, Caprasius may not have been the official leader of the community at Lérins, since he may have been advanced in years at this time or else lacked the charisma of Honoratus.

== Veneration ==
Hilarius of Arles, who had been a monk at Lérins before becoming bishop of Arles, composed a laudatio in honor of Caprasius after the latter's death, which is the main source for Caprasius’ life. His relics are preserved in the Abbey of San Caprasio in Aulla in north Tuscany. The monastery was established by the Benedictine order as a hostel on the Via Francigena, the pilgrimage route to Rome. Originally titled Santa Maria, in 1077 it was dedicated to San Caprasio, as the patron of the town and a patron saint of pilgrims.

Caprasius should not be confused with another French saint of the same name, the martyr Caprasius of Agen.
