= Porcarius I =

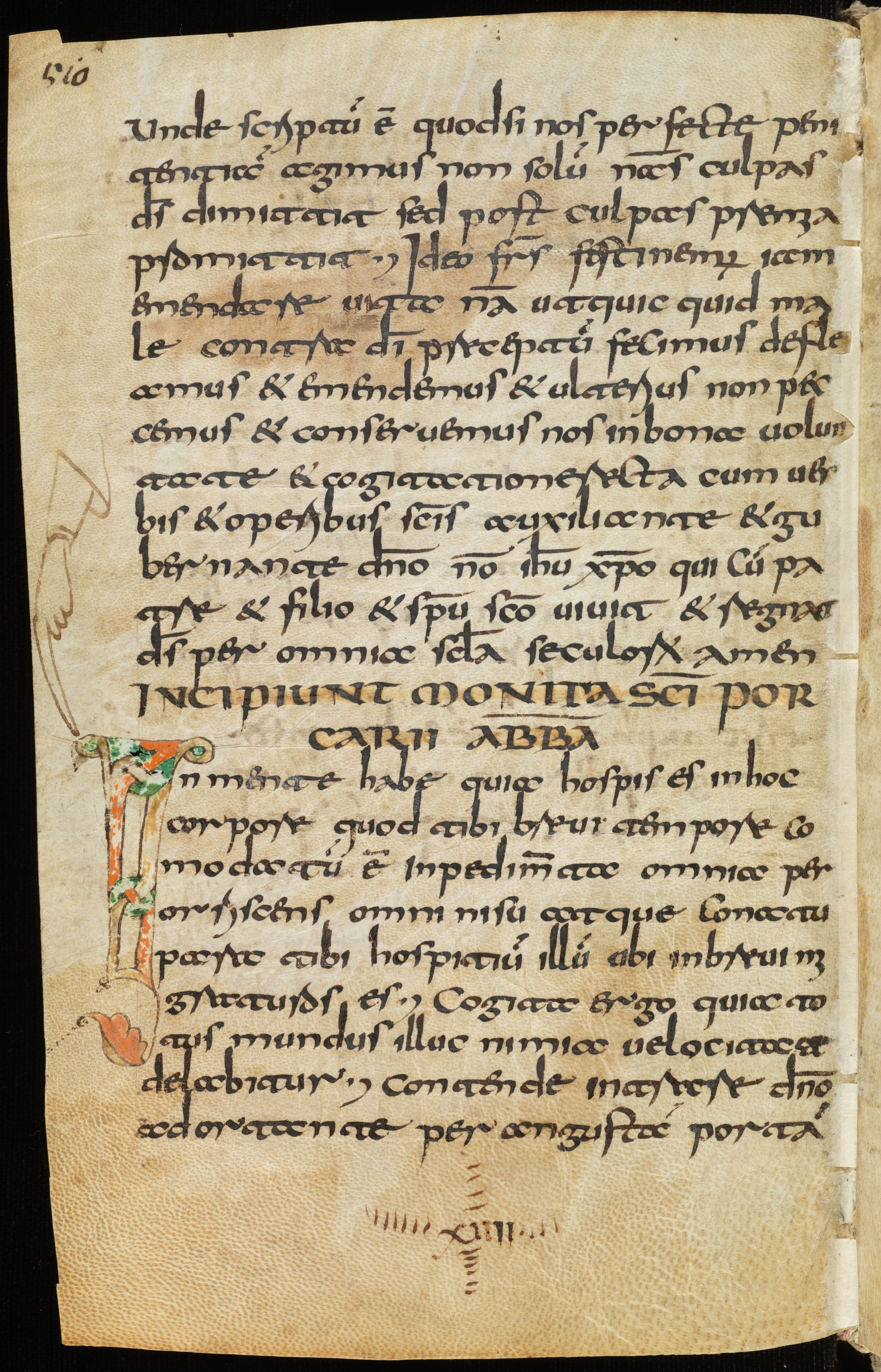
An 8th-century copy of Porcarius' Monita. The large text in the middle of page reads: incipiunt monita s[an]c[t]i porcarii abba, "the counsels of the saint abbot Porcarius begin".

Porcarius I (fl. 489–495) was the abbot of Lérins in the late fifth century and into the early sixth. He wrote at least one spiritual treatise in Latin and two other works have been tentatively assigned to him.

== Life ==
Porcarius' abbacy cannot be dated exactly. The name of no abbot is known between the departure of Faustus after the early 450s and the earliest reference to Porcarius. The next known abbot after Porcarius was Marinus, mentioned in the Vita patrum Iurensium in the years 514–520. Circumstantial evidence suggests that Porcarius was still abbot in the first decade of the sixth century.

According to the Vita of Caesarius of Arles, Porcarius was the abbot when Caesarius arrived at Lérins in 488 or 489. He appointed him cellarer, but late removed him from this office when the other monks complained that he was enforcing a standard of asceticism more rigorous than the abbot's. Sometime before 499 (possibly as early as 495), Caesarius' health declined, owing to his ascetic practices, and Porcarius sent him to Arles to recuperate. At the request of Bishop Aeonius, he then released Caesarius from Lérins. The visit of John of Réôme to Lérins in the period 506–510 and the return of Caesarius to preach a sermon there, probably in 502–512, have both been linked to Porcarius' tenure.

== Works ==
Porcarius is the author of the Monita (Counsels), a short collection of spiritual wisdom. Jonas of Bobbio's Vita Iohannis Reomaensis, a biography of John of Réôme, shows the influence of the Monita in its idealization of the spiritual life. The Monita is addressed to the individual monk. It is "wholly devoted to the interior life" with "no mention made of corporal asceticism". For Porcarius, one's relationship to Christ is central to the spiritual journey. Detachment from the world is essential and the temptations of the Devil must be constantly fought off. The greatest danger is anger. Silence, patience and prayer are of utmost importance to fending off anger and contention with the brothers.

The Monita was not a very popular text. Its manuscripts can be divided into two families, the French and the German. The oldest manuscript is the eighth-century Einsidlensis 199 of the German family. The only other German copy is of the ninth century. The earliest French text is Parisinus Lat. 2675 from the ninth century, all other French texts being of the eleventh century or later. The only writer to cite Porcarius before the Renaissance was the anonymous twelfth-century author of De scriptoribus ecclesiasticis, who spelled his name Porcharius and also confused him with Porcarius II, who died around 732. The first edition of the Monita was published by Thomas Gallet in 1615 under the title Epistola sancti Porcarii abbatis. André Wilmart published a critical edition based on five of eight known manuscripts in 1909. Mark DelCogliano published an English translation in 2003.

Other works have been attributed to Porcarius by Adalbert de Vogüé. The so-called Rule of Macarius, based in part on the work of Macarius of Egypt, may have been compiled by Porcarius or drawn up under his direction at Lérins. Admonitio ad filium spiritualem, which has textual similarities with the Monita, is generally accepted as a work of Porcarius.
