= Niccolò Fieschi =

Italian Cardinal

Coat of arms of Cardinal Niccolò Fieschi

Niccolò Fieschi (Genoa, c. 1456 – Rome, 1524) was an Italian Cardinal, of the prominent family of the Republic of Genoa, the Fieschi, which features in Verdi's Simon Boccanegra.

He was bishop of Fréjus from 1485, and bishop of Agde from 1488. He was archbishop of Ravenna from 1516.

== Notes ==
Nuccolo Fieschi can't be the Fieschi Verdi mantions in his Opera "Simon Boccanegra" since the Opera takes place in the middle of the 14th century and Niccolo lived in the 15th century.

Catholic Church titles
Preceded by Jean Huet	Bishop-elect of Toulon; 1484–1485	Succeeded by Jean Albriga
Preceded by Urbain de Flisco	Bishop-elect of Fréjus; 1485–1486	Succeeded by Rostaing d'Ancezune
Preceded by Rostan d'Ancesune	Bishop of Fréjus; 1495–1524	Succeeded by Franciot des Ursins
Preceded by Jacques Minutoli	Bishop of Agde; 1490–1494	Succeeded by Jean de Vesc
Preceded by Nicolas de Villeneuve	Bishop of Senez; 1507–1512	Succeeded by Jean-Baptiste de Laigue D'Oraison
Preceded by Giulio di Giuliano de' Medici	Archbishop of Embrun; 1511–1516	Succeeded by François de Tournon
Preceded by Denis Briçonnet	Bishop of Toulon; 1516	Succeeded by Philos Roverella
Preceded by Filiasio Roverella	Archbishop of Ravenna; 1516–1517	Succeeded by Urbano Fieschi
Preceded by Simone de Nor	Bishop of Andria; 1517	Succeeded by Giovanni Francesco Fieschi
Preceded by Didier Gilionis (Bishop-elect)	Bishop of Umbriatico; 1517–1520	Succeeded by Andrea della Valle
Preceded by Francisco de Remolins	Cardinal-bishop of Albano; 1518–1521	Succeeded by Giovanni Francesco Gambara
Preceded by Francesco Soderini	Cardinal-bishop of Sabina; 1521–1523	Succeeded by Alessandro Farnese
Preceded by Francesco Soderini	Cardinal-bishop of Porto; 1523–1524	Succeeded by Alessandro Farnese
Preceded by Francesco Soderini	Cardinal-bishop of Ostia; 1524	Succeeded by Alessandro Farnese
Preceded by Francesco Soderini	Dean of the College of Cardinals; 1524	Succeeded by Alessandro Farnese
