= Dominique Rey =

French prelate

His Excellency Dominique Marie Jean Rey Comm. l'Emm.
- Bishop emeritus of Fréjus-Toulon
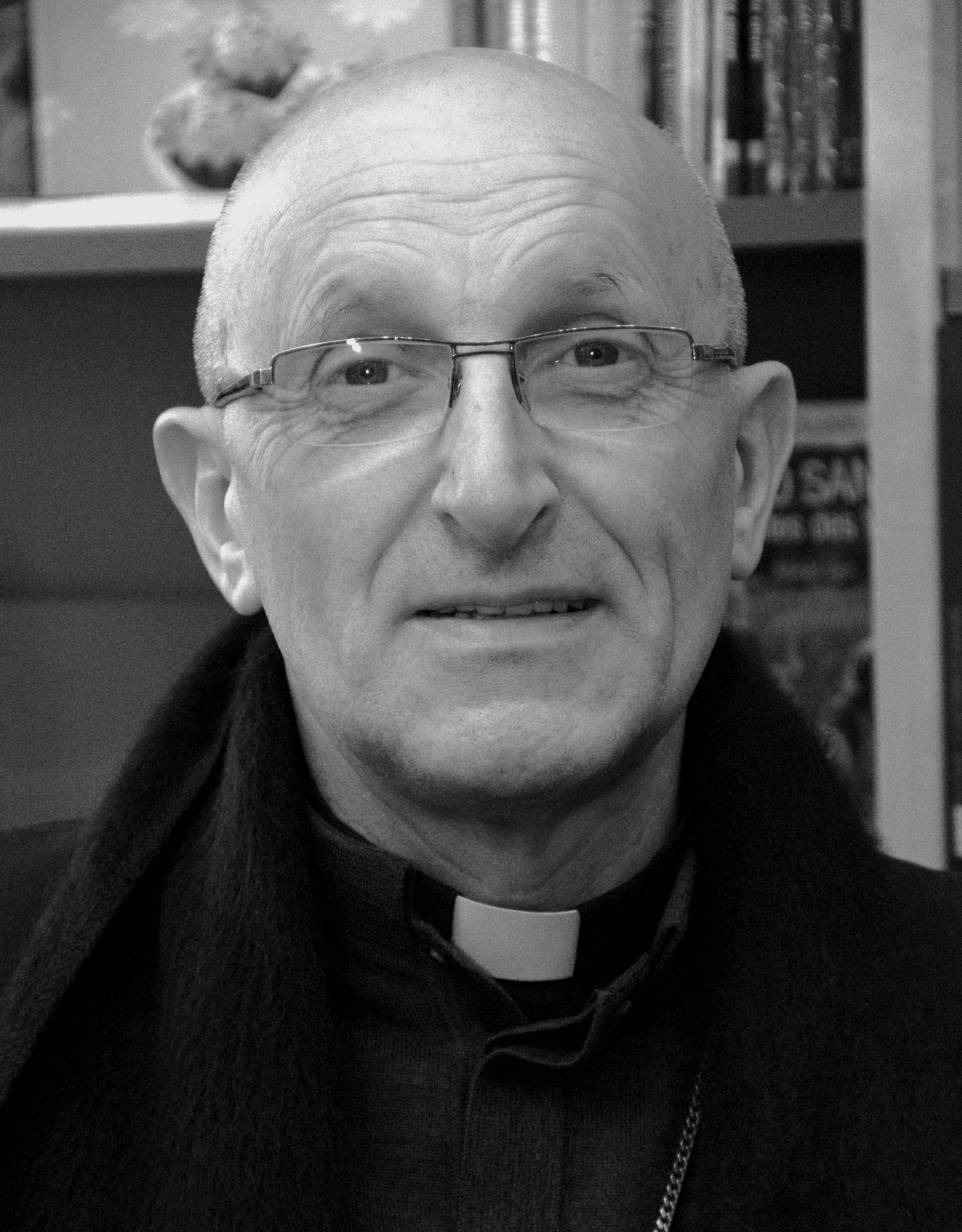
- Rey in 2013
- Appointed: 16 May 2000
- Installed: 17 September 2000
- Term ended: 7 January 2025
- Predecessor: Joseph Théophile Louis Marie Madec
- Successor: François Touvet

Orders
- Ordination: 23 June 1984
- Consecration: 17 September 2000 by Jean-Marie Lustiger

Personal details
- Born: 21 September 1952 (age 73) Saint-Étienne, France
- Denomination: Catholic Church
- Motto: Doux et humble de Cœur
- Coat of arms

Dominique Marie Jean Rey (born 21 September 1952) is a French prelate of the Catholic Church who was the Bishop of Fréjus-Toulon from 2000 to 2025. He is a member of the Emmanuel Community, and he is considered one of the more conservative French bishops. He also frequently celebrates Tridentine Mass. He has been criticized for ordaining priests who have failed to qualify for the priesthood in their home countries, failing to supervise religious communities he has established, and for inadequate action against sex abusers in his diocese.

== Biography ==
Rey was born in Saint-Étienne on 21 September 1952. He served as curé of Ste. Trinité church in Paris from 1995 to 2000.

On 16 May 2000, Pope John Paul II appointed him Bishop of Fréjus-Toulon. He received his episcopal consecration on 17 September 2000 from Cardinal Jean-Marie Lustiger.

On 18 September 2012, Bishop Rey was appointed by Pope Benedict XVI to participate in the October 2012 13th Ordinary General Assembly of the Synod of Bishops on the New Evangelization.

He is the author of a book that argues that being a Catholic and a Freemason (Note: The nature of Continental Freemasonry in France differ significantly from those mainly operating in the English-speaking world, so called Regular Freemasonry.) are incompatible.

In June 2013, he organized a four-day conference on sacred liturgy at the Pontifical University of the Holy Cross in Rome. (Note: The monk Rey tasked with managing the conference described its overarching theme: "We hope to give further impetus to the “new liturgical movement,” something that has spread throughout the Church in recent years and which encompasses a desire to implement the liturgical reforms called for by the Second Vatican Council more faithfully as well as an openness to the riches of the pre-conciliar liturgy. Both of these have much to give in sustaining our Christian life and mission today, and both have their rightful place in the life of the Church. At the conference we will celebrate solemn Mass and Vespers in both forms.")

On 6 February 2014, Pope Francis named him a consultor to the Pontifical Council for the Laity.

In August 2015, breaking with the policy of the Conference of French Bishops, he invited Marion Maréchal-Le Pen, a prominent National Front member of the French parliament, to participate on a panel of politicians in his diocese. Rey defended the invitation: "The FN is a party like any other on the political chessboard. You have to be realistic, don't cover your eyes and ears!"

Within the Bishop's Conference of France he is a member of the episcopal finance commission.

An apostolic visitation of the diocese, ordered by the Dicastery for Bishops began on 13 February 2023: Antoine Hérouard, (Note: Hérouard was secretary of the French Bishops Conference, then rector of the French seminary in Rome from 2014 to 2017. He had been auxiliary bishop of Lille from 2017 to 2022, when he became archbishop of Dijon.) Archbishop of Dijon, assisted by Joël Mercier, secretary of the Dicastery for the Clergy, and a Curial official since 2002, conducted the investigation. The visitation concluded on 10 March after conducting 110 interviews and reviewing 600 written submissions. Its report expressed particular concern about how communities with questionable pasts were welcomed and about the conduct of missions to convert Muslims.

On 21 November 2023, Pope Francis named Bishop François Touvet to serve as coadjutor bishop of Fréjus-Toulon and assigned him much of the authority Rey would normally have continued to exercise even when assisted by a coadjutor: "the special powers of the diocesan government in the areas of administration, management of the clergy, training of seminarians and priests, support of institutes of consecrated life, societies of apostolic life, and associations of the faithful". (Note: Upon Touvet's arrival, the Vatican authorized ordinations, which had been suspended, to proceed once more.) Rey welcomed him and said he was delighted Pope Francis had accepted his proposal that a coadjutor be appointed. Rey had a private audience with Pope Francis on 22 December.

Within the Bishop's Conference of France Rey was a member of the episcopal finance commission from 2017 to 2023.

Pope Francis accepted his resignation on 7 January 2025, after asking Rey to resign late in 2024.

== Notes ==
=== Distinctions ===
- Chevalier of the Ordre national du Mérite, France
- Prelate Grand Cross of the Order of Saint Lazarus (statuted 1910) (2017).
