= Saint Nazarius (abbot) =

French Roman Catholic saint

Saint Nazarius (French: Saint Nazaire) was the fourteenth abbot of the monastery of Lérins, probably during the reign of the Merovingian Clotaire II (584–629). He successfully attacked the remnants of paganism on the southern coast of France, overthrew a sanctuary of Venus near Cannes, and founded a convent for women on its site, which the Saracens destroyed in the 8th century. His name is inscribed on the calendar of saints of the French Church, on 18 November.
