= Lérins Islands =

Archipelago in Cannes, France

Native name: Îles de Lérins
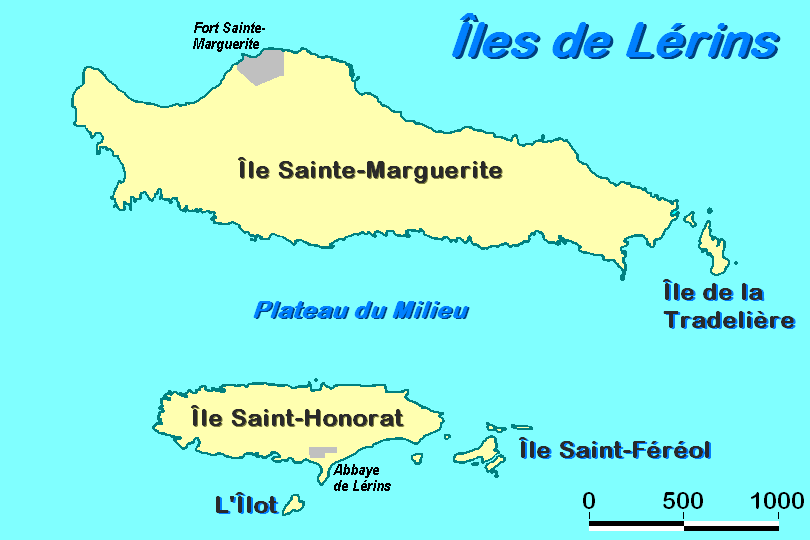
- Map of the Lérins Islands

- Location within Provence-Alpes-Côte d'Azur Location within France Location within Mediterranean

Geography
- Location: Mediterranean Sea
- Coordinates: 43°31′03″N 07°02′42″E
- Adjacent to: Bay of Cannes
- Total islands: 5
- Major islands: Île Sainte-Marguerite, Île Saint-Honorat
- Area: 2.5 km^{2} (0.97 sq mi)
- Coastline: 12 km (7.5 mi)
- Highest point: Fort of Sainte-Marguerite

Administration
- France
- Region: Provence-Alpes-Côte d'Azur
- Department: Alpes-Maritimes
- Commune: Cannes

Demographics
- Population: 40
- Pop. density: 16/km^{2} (41/sq mi)

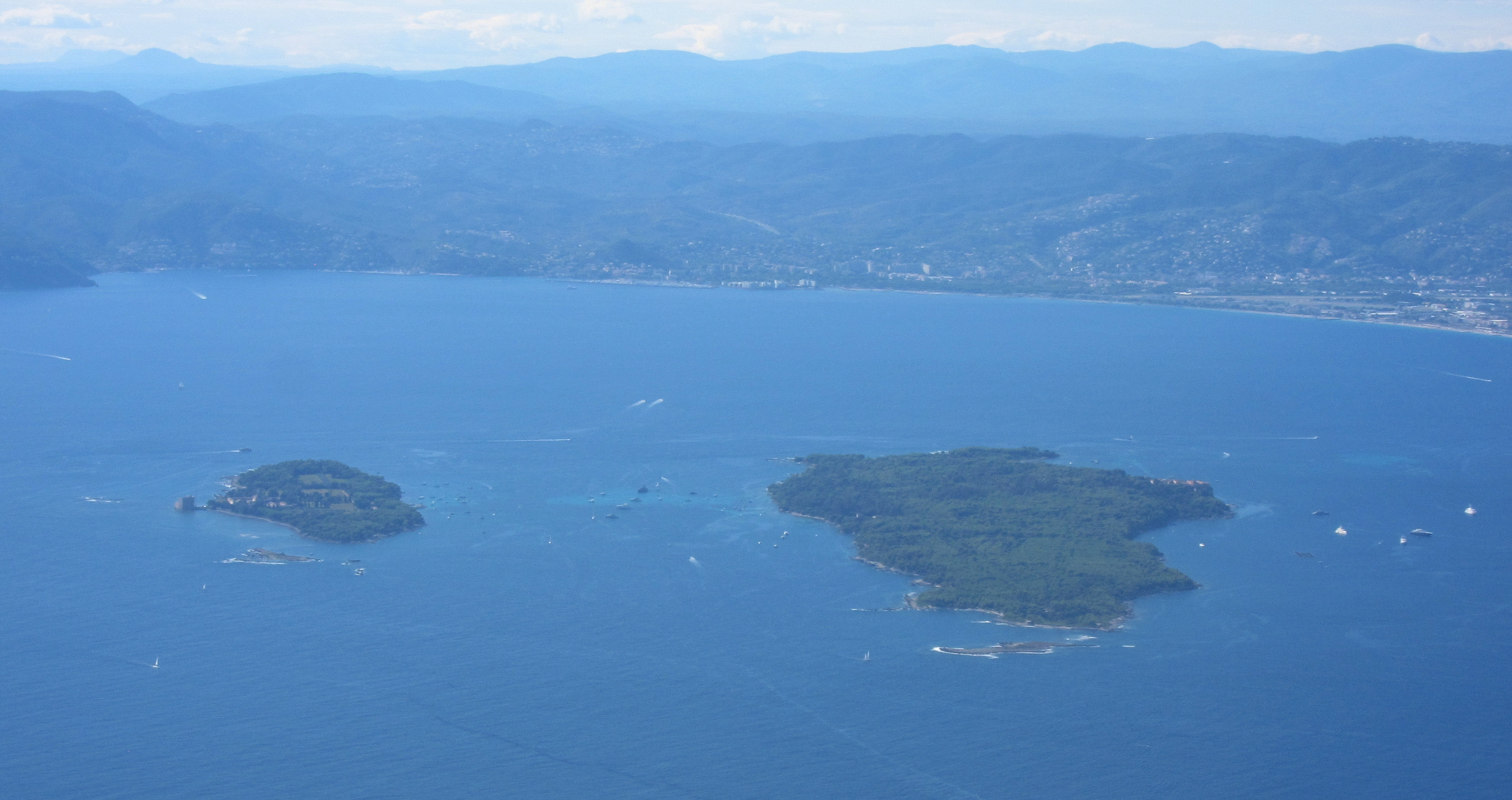
The Lérins Islands looking towards the west.

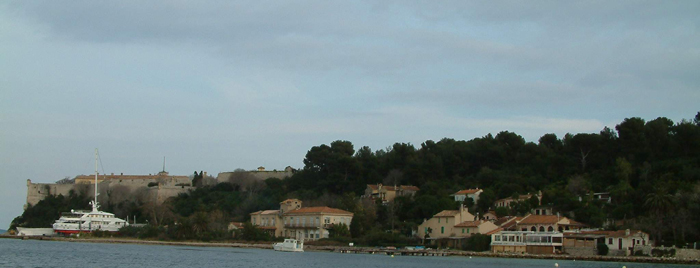
View of the Île Sainte-Marguerite, including the Fort Royal and the village of Sainte-Marguerite.

The Lérins Islands (in French: les Îles de Lérins, pronounced [lɛz‿il də leʁɛ̃s]) are a group of five Mediterranean islands off the French Riviera, in Cannes. The two largest islands in this group are Île Sainte-Marguerite and Île Saint-Honorat. The smaller Îlot Saint-Ferréol, Îlot de la Tradelière and Îlot de l'Ilon (also called l'Îlot) are uninhabited. Administratively, the islands belong to the commune of Cannes.

The islands are first known to have been inhabited during Roman times.

The Île de Saint-Honorat bears the name of the founder of the monastery of Lérins, Saint Honoratus. It was founded around the year 410. According to tradition, Saint Patrick, patron of Ireland, studied there in the fifth century. Around 500, the community was led by Porcarius I. Around 732, the Abbot Porcarius II was killed during a Saracen raid.

In 1047 the islands were raided by pirates from Andalusia. Thereafter, a fortified monastery was built between the eleventh and fourteenth centuries. The monastic community today lives in a monastery built during the nineteenth century.

The Île Sainte-Marguerite held a fortress where the Man in the Iron Mask was held captive for a time.

During the Thirty Years' War, Spain was in possession of the islands between September 1635 and May 1637, and built or rebuilt four fortresses on Santa Margarita.

In 1707 the Lérins were occupied by the English navy, under the command of Sir Cloudesley Shovell. This was done in order to block the military port of Toulon to help the army of Victor Amadeus II Duke of Savoy and his cousin Eugene besiege that city.

Under the French Revolution, the Île Sainte-Marguerite and the Île Saint-Honorat were renamed the Île Marat and the Île Lepeletier, after secular martyrs.

== Île Sainte-Marguerite ==
Île Sainte-Marguerite (Saint Margaret Island) is about a 15-minute boat ride away from Cannes harbour. The cell of the mysterious 'Man with the Iron Mask' can be visited in the Fort of Sainte-Marguerite, now renamed the Musée de la Mer (Museum of the Sea). This museum also houses archaeological discoveries from shipwrecks off the coast of the island, including Roman and Saracen ceramics. There is a regular boat service from the mainland.

== Île Saint-Honorat ==
Île Saint-Honorat (Saint Honorat Island), the smaller, southern island, is only inhabited by Cistercian monks. Monks have inhabited the island more or less continuously since AD 410 and, at the height of their secular power, owned Cannes, Mougins, and Vallauris, plus Seborga, Italy. Medieval vestiges remain in the stark church, which is open to the public, and in the ruins of the 11th-century monastery on the sea's edge. The monks divide their time between prayer and producing red and white wine, honey, lavender oil and Lérina, a herbal liqueur. Although closed to the general public, the monastery welcomes guests for week-long retreats. The monks also run the only boat trips to the island, with departures from Cannes' jetty Albert-Edouard.

== See also ==
- Saint Vincent of Lérins
