= Île Saint-Honorat =

Island in Cannes, France

Coordinates: 43°30′28″N 7°02′45″E

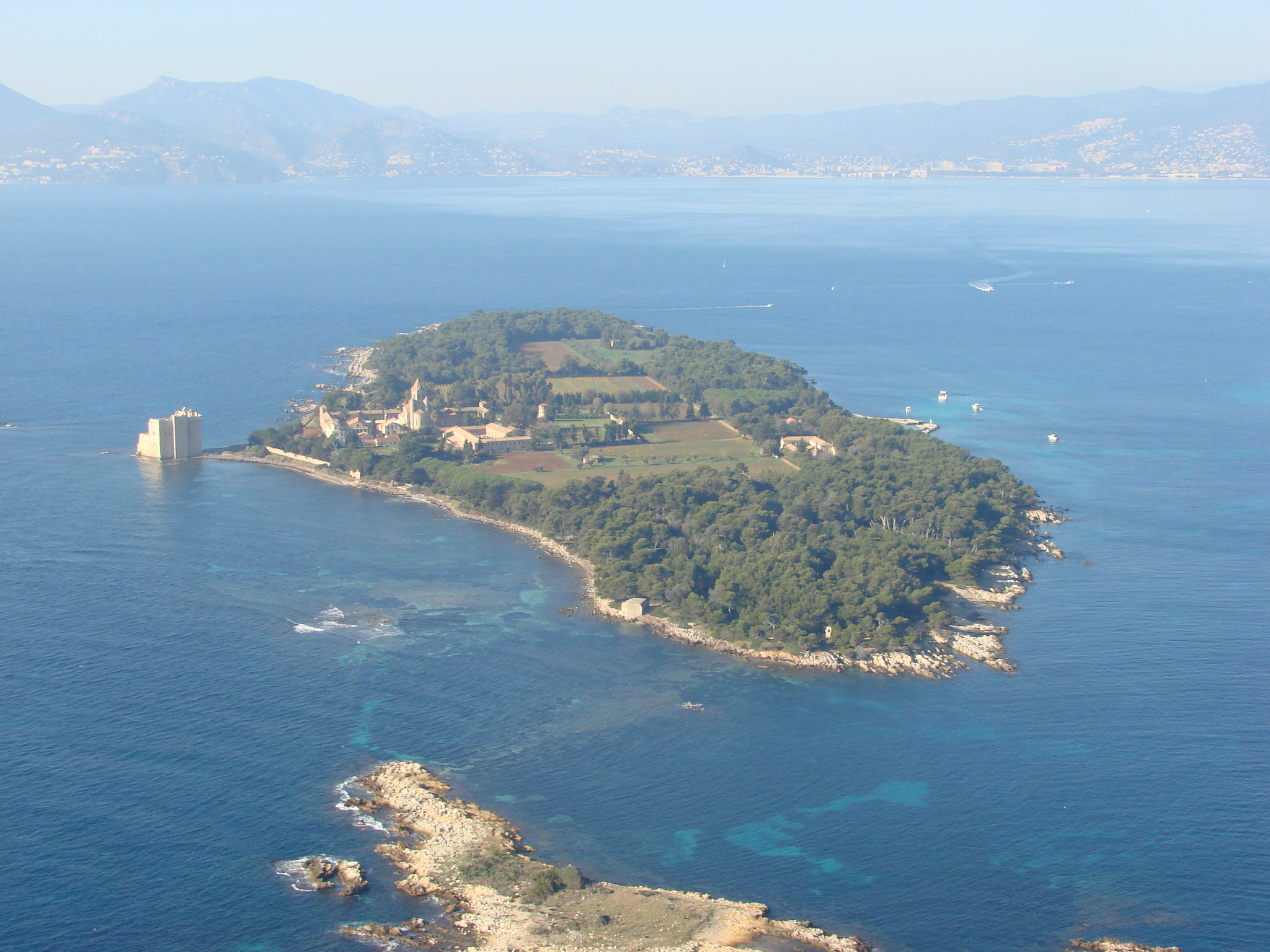
Aerial view of Île Saint-Honorat

Île Saint-Honorat (French pronunciation: [il sɛ̃tɔnɔʁa]) is the second-largest of the Lérins Islands, about 1.6 kilometres (1 mi) off shore from the French Riviera city of Cannes. The island is approximately 1.5 kilometres (0.93 mi) in length (east to west) and 400 metres (1,300 ft) wide.

Since the 5th century, the island has been home to a community of monks.

== History ==
The island, known to the Romans as Lerina, was uninhabited until Saint Honoratus founded a monastery on it at some time around the year 410. According to tradition, Honoratus made his home on the island intending to live as a hermit, but found himself joined by disciples (including Saint Caprais (Caprasius) who formed a monastic community around him. This had become "an immense monastery" by 427, according to the contemporary writings of John Cassian. Later legends have it that Saint Patrick, patron of Ireland, studied at the monastery in the fifth century.

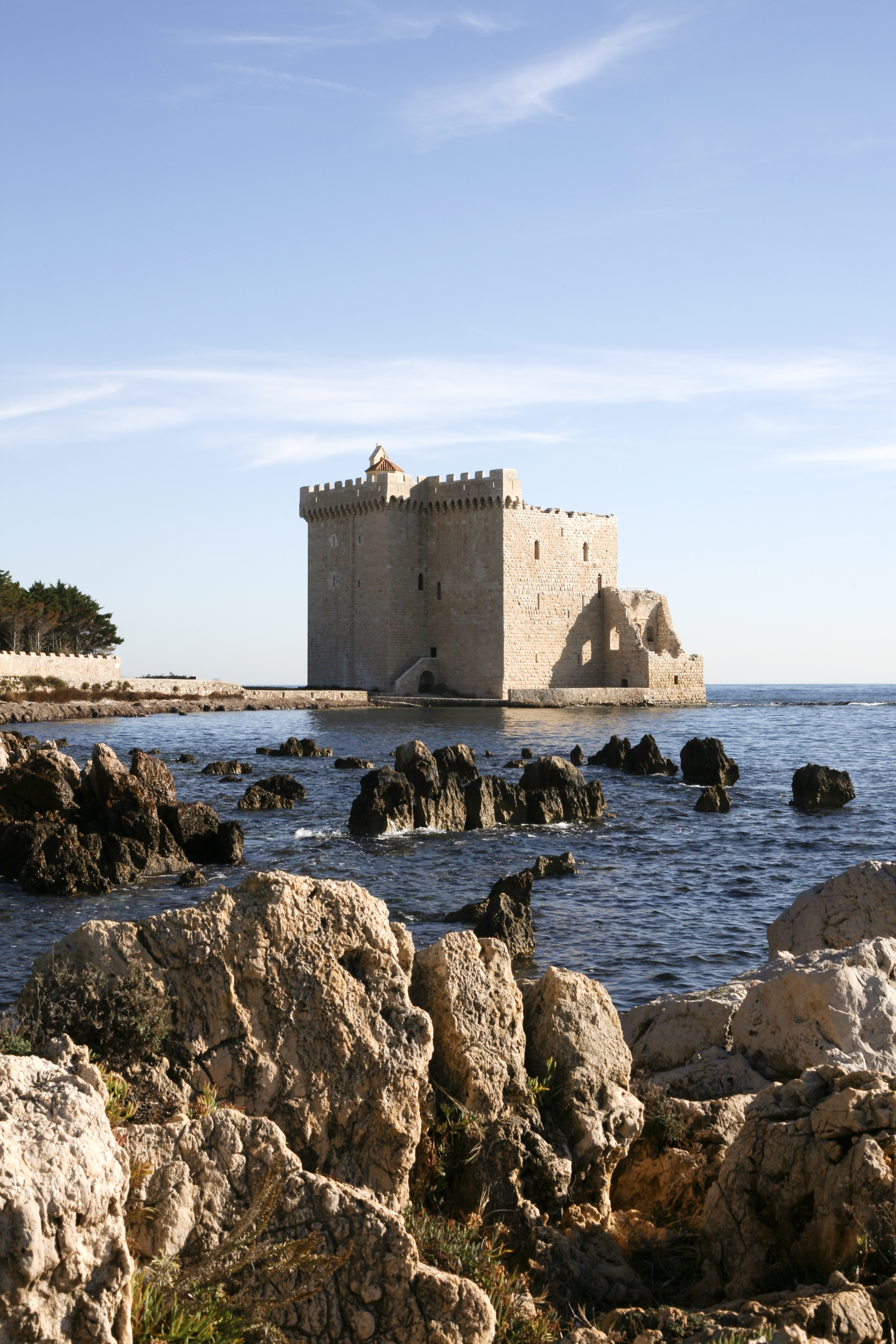
Fortified monastery of Abbey Lérins.

Over the following centuries, monastic life on the island was interrupted on several occasions by raids, mostly attributable to Saracens. Around 732, many of the community, including the abbot, Saint Porcarius, were massacred on the island by invaders. According to myth, many of the monks escaped, because Porcarius had been warned of the attack by an angel and had sent them to safety.

In medieval times, the island became a very popular place of pilgrimage. This was encouraged by the writings of Raymond Féraud, a monk who composed a mythological life of Honoratus.

In 1635, the island was captured by the Spanish, and the monks were expelled. They returned from exile in Vallauris two years later when the island was retaken by the French.

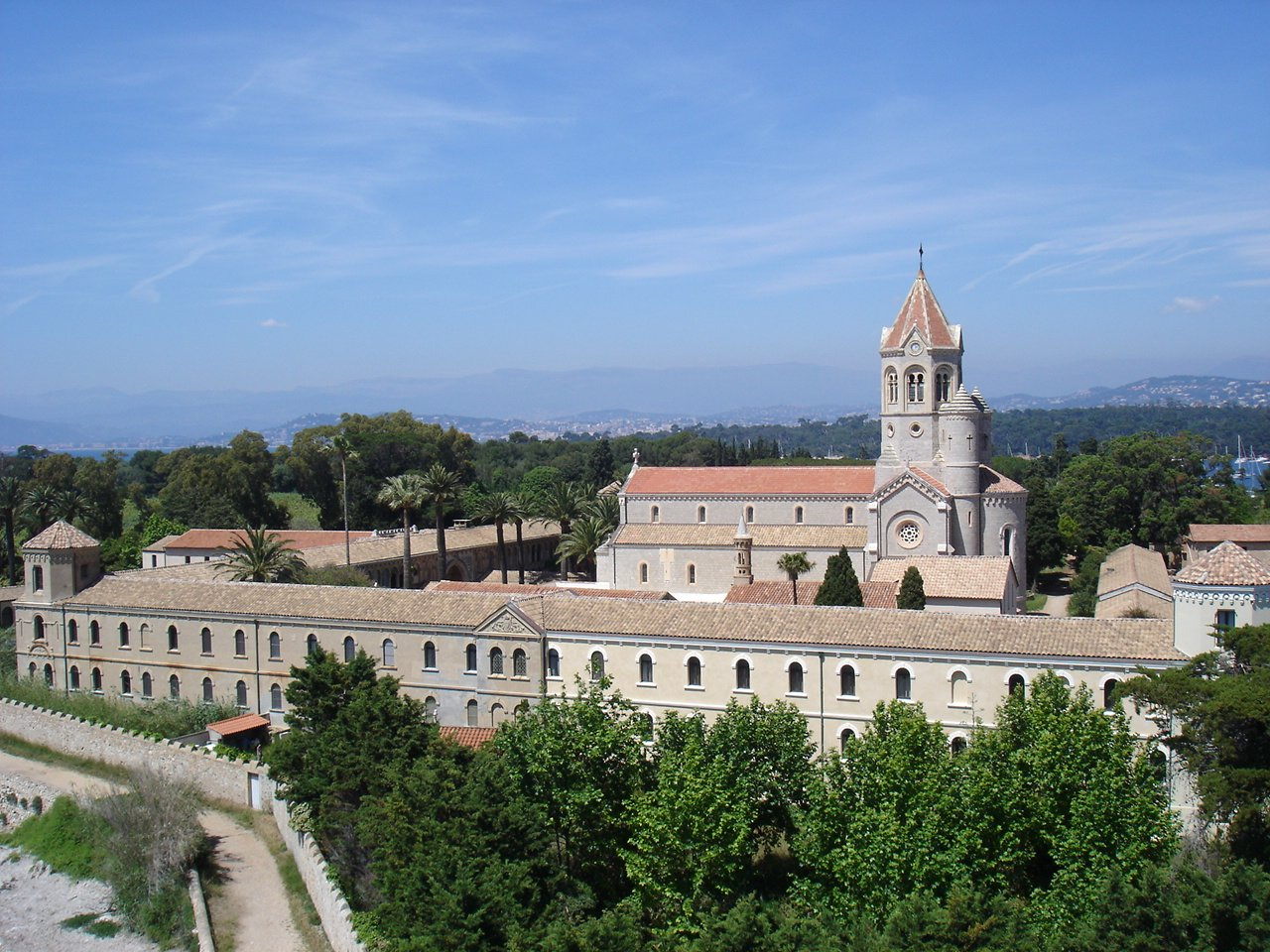
Church and monastery of the Lérins Abbey.

The monastery continued to suffer from Spanish and Genoese attacks. The number of monks dwindled to four and, in the proto-revolutionary climate of the time, the monastery was disestablished in 1787. Under the Revolution, the island became the property of the state, and was sold to a wealthy actress, Mademoiselle de Sainval, who lived there for twenty years.

In 1859, the island was bought by the Bishop of Fréjus, who sought to re-establish a religious community there. Ten years later, a Cistercian community was established, which has remained there ever since.

== Present ==
The island retains a monastery, which is home to 30 Cistercian monks, and is a popular tourist attraction offering pleasant woodland surroundings, in common with its neighbour the Île Sainte-Marguerite. Points of interest include a number of disused chapels erected by monks on the island at different points in history, as well as the remains of a Napoleonic cannonball oven and a Second World War gun emplacement.

The Abbey of Lérins and the 15th Century fortified monastery are open to visitors, and a monastery shop sells various monastic goods, including wine and olive oil produced on the island. The modern monastery is closed to visitors, although it is used as a Christian retreat.

The island is served all year round by a regular commercial ferry service from Cannes.
