= Francesco Soderini =

Florentine diplomat and religious leader

Francesco di Tommaso Soderini (10 June 1453 – 17 May 1524) was a major diplomatic and Church figure of Renaissance Italy, and brother of Piero Soderini. He was an adversary of the Medici family.

== Biography ==
On 27 Mar 1486, he was ordained a priest by Rinaldo Orsini, Archbishop of Florence. He became Bishop of Volterra in 1478, by nomination, resigning in 1509. In 1487, he was ordained and received his cardinalate in 1503, supported by Louis XII of France. He was Bishop of Cortona from 1504–1505 and held further church posts.

He was complicit in the plot of fellow Cardinals Bandinello Sauli and Alfonso Petrucci against Leo X for the benefit of Cardinal Riario; he went into voluntary exile in 1517, returning to Rome in 1521.

== Bibliography ==
- Lowe, K. J. P. (1993). Church and Politics in Renaissance Italy: The Life and Career of Cardinal Francesco Soderini, 1453-1524. Cambridge: Cambridge University Press 1993.
- Cheney, David M. "Francesco Cardinal Soderini". Catholic-Hierarchy.org. ^{[self-published]}

Catholic Church titles
Preceded by Antonio dell'Agli	Bishop of Volterra; 1478–1509	Succeeded by Giuliano Soderini
Preceded by Juan de Borja Lanzol de Romaní, el mayor	Cardinal-Priest of Santa Susanna; 1503–1508	Succeeded by Leonardo Grosso della Rovere
Preceded by Raniero de Guicciardini	Bishop of Cortona; 1504–1505	Succeeded by Guglielmo Capponi
Preceded by Raymond Pérault	Administrator of Saintes; 1507–1514	Succeeded by Giuliano Soderini
Preceded by Leonardo Grosso della Rovere	Cardinal-Priest of Santi XII Apostoli; 1508–1511	Succeeded by Niccolò Fieschi
Preceded by Bernardino López de Carvajal y Sande	Cardinal-Bishop of Sabina; 1511–1513	Succeeded by Bernardino López de Carvajal y Sande
Preceded by Camillo Leonini	Cardinal-Bishop of Tivoli; 1513–1516	Succeeded by Camillo Leonini
Preceded by Francesco della Rovere	Bishop of Vicenza; 1514–1524	Succeeded by Niccolò Ridolfi
Preceded by Pietro Guzman	Administrator of Narni; 1515–1517	Succeeded by Ugolino Martelli
Preceded by Jaime Serra i Cau	Cardinal-Bishop of Palestrina; 1516–1523	Succeeded by Alessandro Farnese
Preceded by Giacomo Bongalli	Bishop of Anagni; 1517–1523	Succeeded by Luigi di Volterra
Preceded by Jaime Serra y Cau	Cardinal-bishop of Albano; 1516–1517	Succeeded by Francisco de Remolins
Preceded by Domenico Grimani	Cardinal-Bishop of Porto e Santa Rufina; 1523	Succeeded by Niccolò Fieschi
Preceded by Bernardino López de Carvajal y Sande	Cardinal-bishop of Ostia; 1523–1524	Succeeded by Niccolò Fieschi
Preceded by Bernardino López de Carvajal y Sande	Dean of the College of Cardinals; 1523–1524	Succeeded by Niccolò Fieschi
