= Toulon Cathedral =

Catholic church in Toulon, France

Coordinates: 43°7′18″N 5°56′3″E

Toulon Cathedral Cathédrale Notre-Dame-de-la-Seds de Toulon
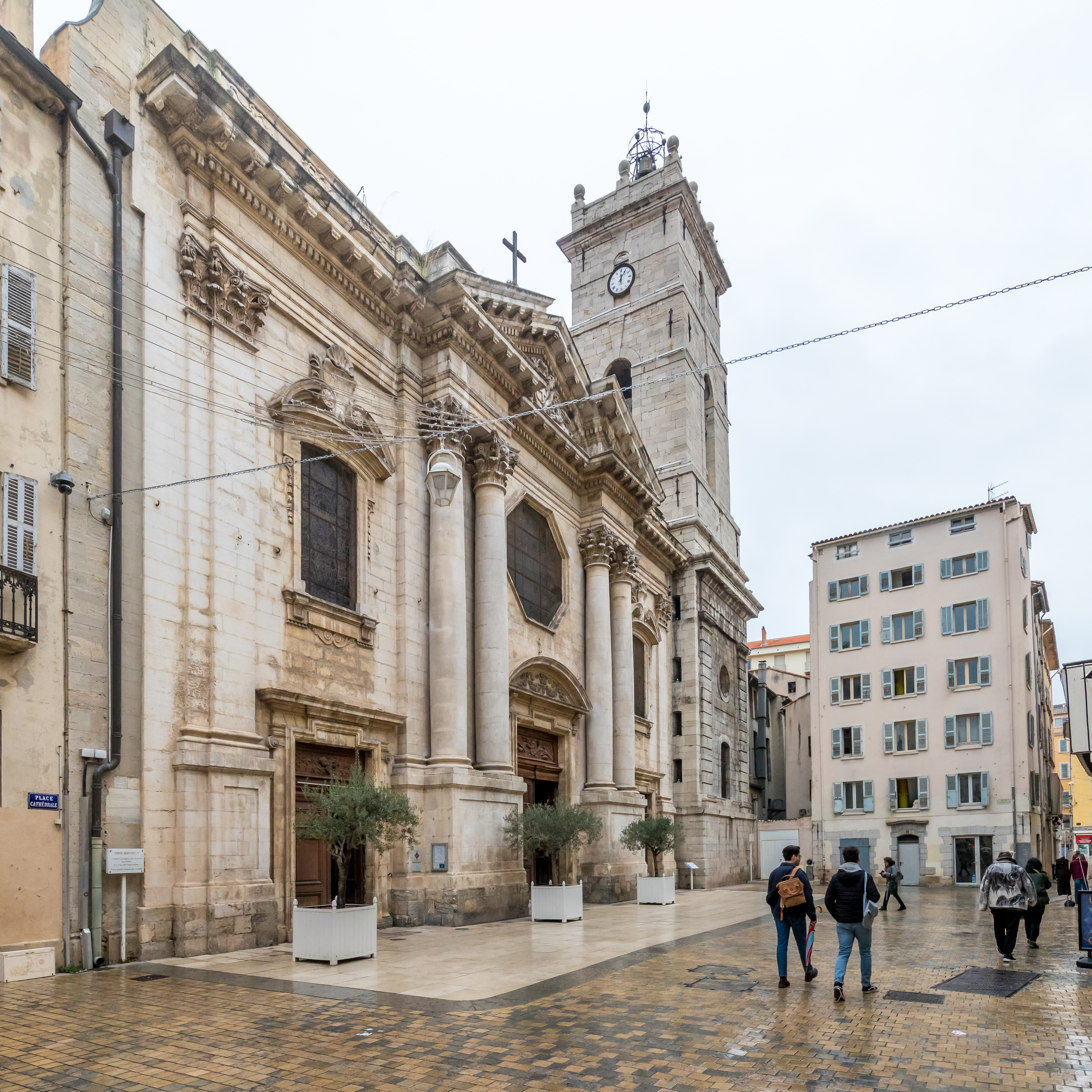
- Facade of Toulon Cathedral (17th century) and bell tower (18th century)

Religion
- Affiliation: Catholic Church
- Diocese: Diocese of Fréjus-Toulon
- Rite: Roman
- Ecclesiastical or organizational status: Cathedral

Location
- Location: Toulon, France
- Interactive map of Toulon Cathedral; Cathédrale Notre-Dame-de-la-Seds de Toulon

Architecture
- Type: church
- Style: Baroque, Romanesque, Corinthian
- Groundbreaking: 11th century
- Completed: 18th century

Toulon Cathedral (French: Cathédrale Notre-Dame-de-la-Seds de Toulon; Notre-Dame-de-la-Sède de Toulon), also known as Sainte-Marie-Majeure, is a Catholic church located in Toulon, in the Var department of France. The cathedral is a national monument. Construction of the church began in the 11th century and finished in the 18th century. From the 5th century onwards, it was the seat of the Bishops of Toulon, and since 1957 has been the ecclesiastical seat of the Diocese of Fréjus-Toulon.

== History ==
The first cathedral at Toulon existed in the 5th century, but no trace of it remains. The present building was begun in 1096 by Gilbert, Count of Provence, according to tradition in gratitude for his safe return from the Crusades. The first three travées, or bays of the nave, remain from the Romanesque 11th century church and the present Chapel of Saint Joseph was originally the choir apse. The Chapel of Relics was constructed in the 15th century.

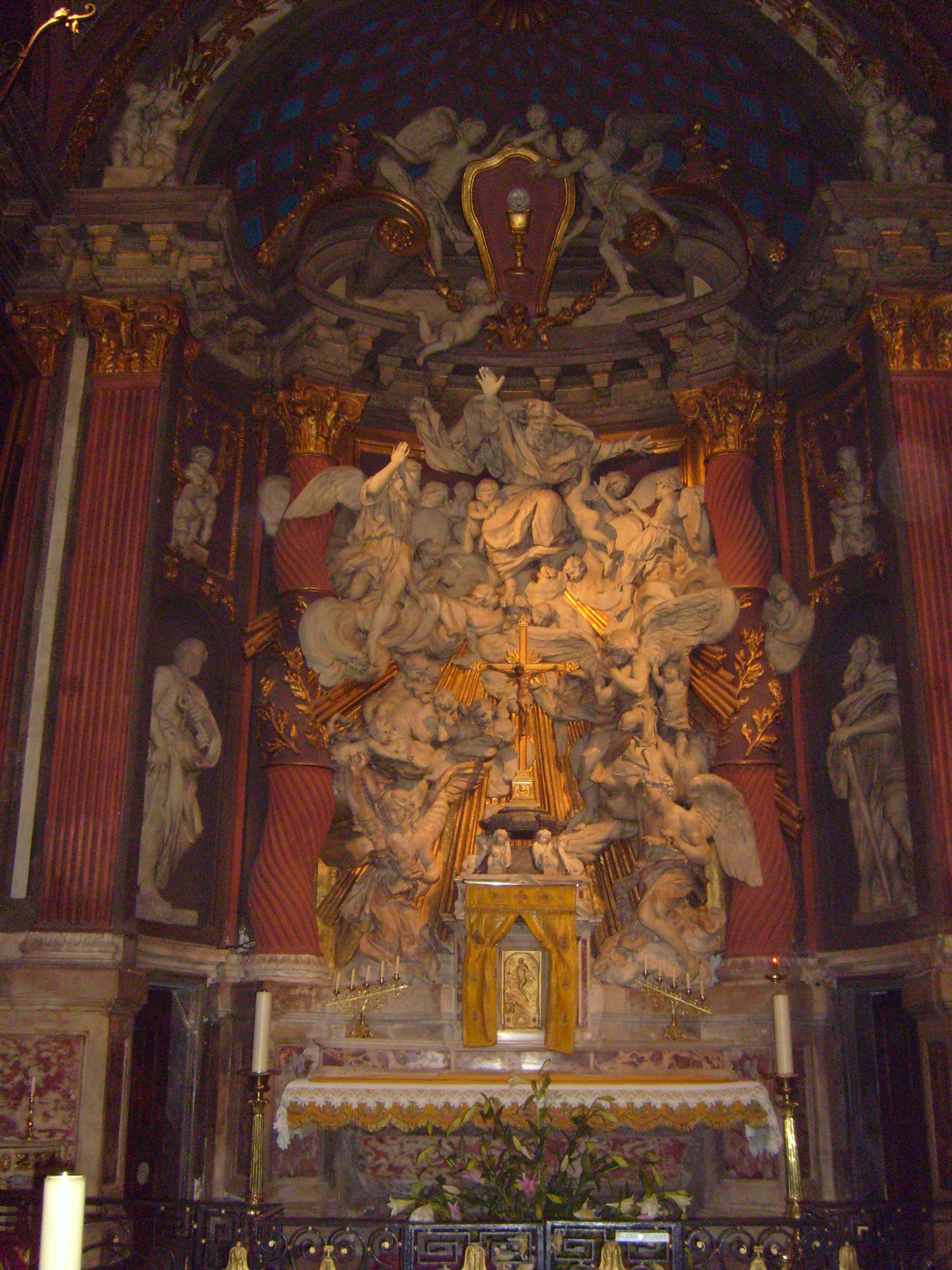
Retable by Pierre Puget (17th century)

In the winter of 1543–1544 the cathedral, the largest building in the city, was temporarily transformed into a mosque for the 30,000 crew members of the ships of the Ottoman-Barbary admiral Hayreddin Barbarossa, at that time an ally of Francis I of France. The residents of Toulon were temporarily expelled from the city to make room for the Turkish sailors. At the end of the winter, King Francis paid a large bribe to the Turkish admiral to persuade him and his fleet to leave.

As the naval port of Toulon was enlarged by Henri IV and Louis XIV, and the city became more important, the cathedral was also enlarged. Additions between 1654 and 1659 had the effect of enclosing the original Romanesque building and incorporating the Chapel of Relics.

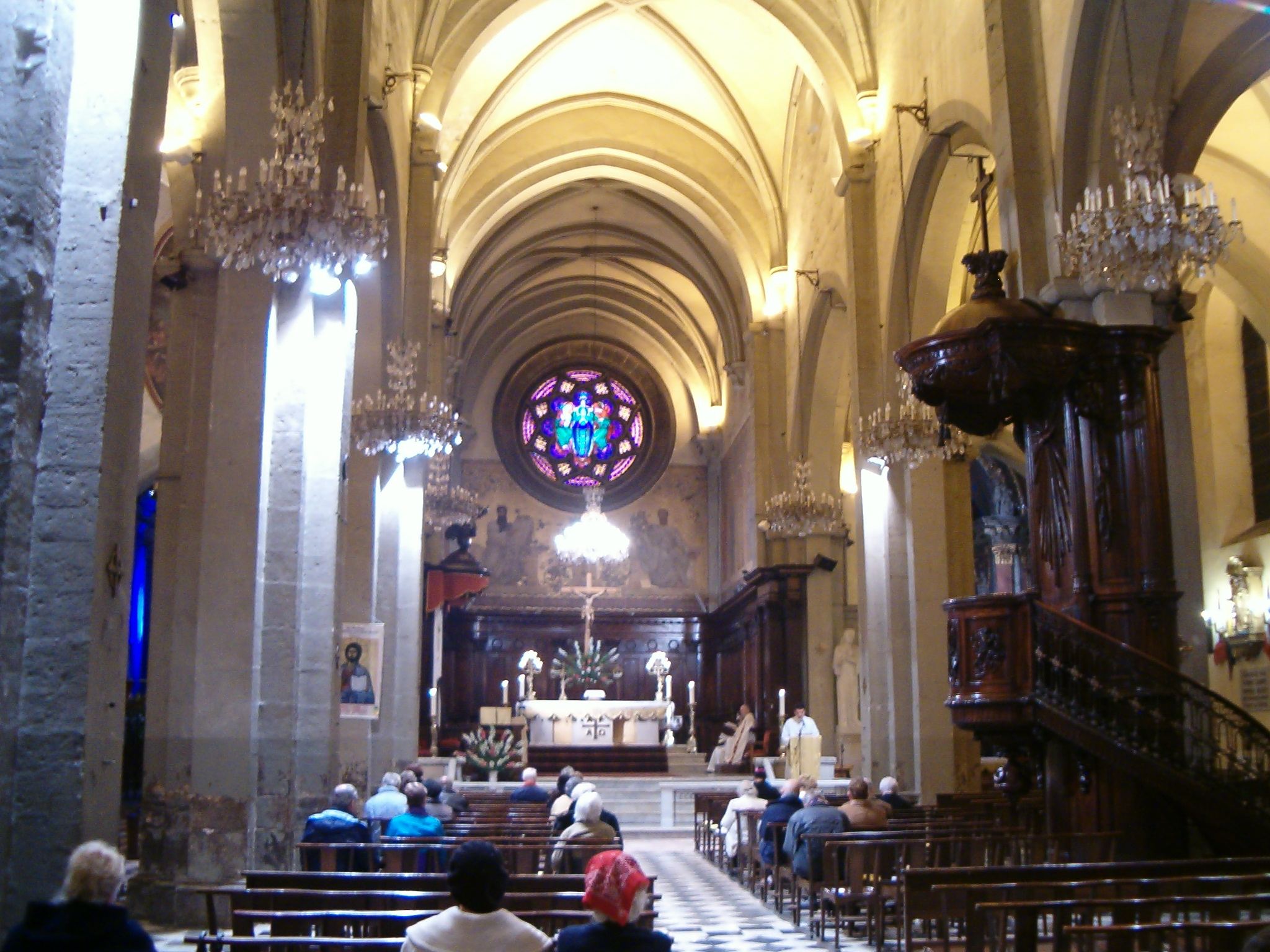
Nave of Toulon Cathedral (11th-17th century)

From 1696 to 1701, during the reign of Louis XIV, the Toulon church's classical façade was constructed. Angels on the tympanum of the massive porch, supported on Corinthian columns, hold the arms of Toulon. The façade was badly damaged in the French Revolution, but was restored to its original appearance in 1816. It also displays a memorial plaque from 1239, dedicated to Gilbert of Baux, who died in 1239, and to Gaufridet of Trets and Toulon, and his wife Dame Guillaumette, both of whom died in 1234.

The clock tower was built between 1737 and 1740, around the same time as the monumental gate of the Toulon Arsenal. It is 36 meters high, and three meters thick at the base.

On top of the tower is an iron campanile, where a bell has kept time in Toulon since 1524. The original bells were taken and melted down during the French Revolution. In 1806 and 1807 they were replaced by four new bells.

== Art in the Cathedral ==
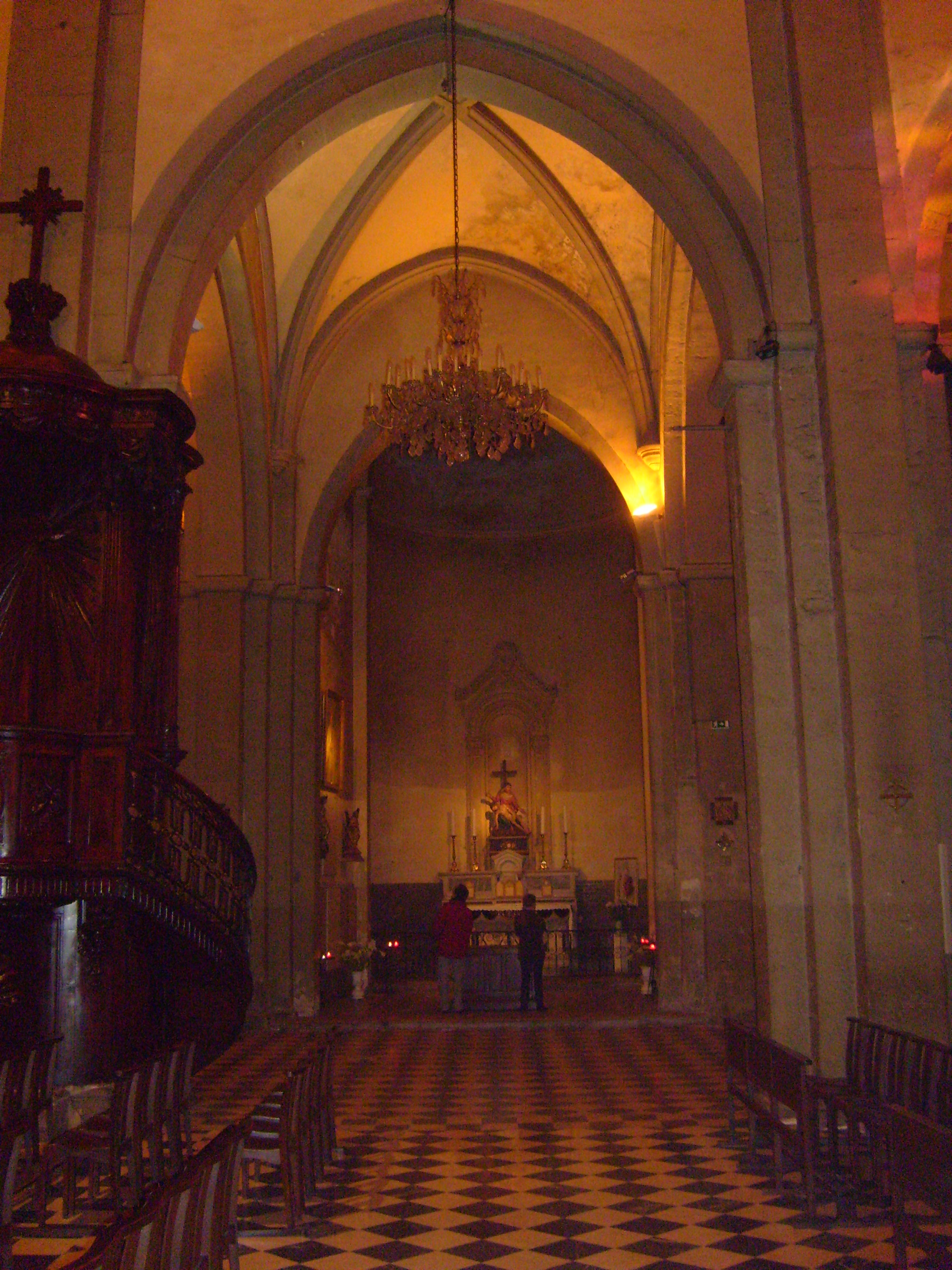
St. Joseph Chapel was originally the choir apse of the 11th century Cathedral

The most notable work of art in the cathedral is the eighteenth century Baroque retable made to hold the Holy Sacrament, located in the Corpus Christi chapel. The original retable was designed by the sculptor and painter Pierre Puget, and made of wood. The original was destroyed by fire in 1661, and replaced in 1681 by a replica made of marble and stucco by Puget's nephew and student, Christophe Veyrier.

== See also ==
- Roman Catholicism in France
- Islam in France
- List of cathedrals in France
- List of mosques in France

== Sources ==
- Curnier-Laroche, Père Frederic, nd: Cathédrale Notre Dame de la Seds. Imprimerie Beaulieu.
- Vergé-Franceschi, Michel, 2002: Toulon - port royal (1481–1789). Tallandier: Paris.
