= Quinidius =

Saint Quinidius
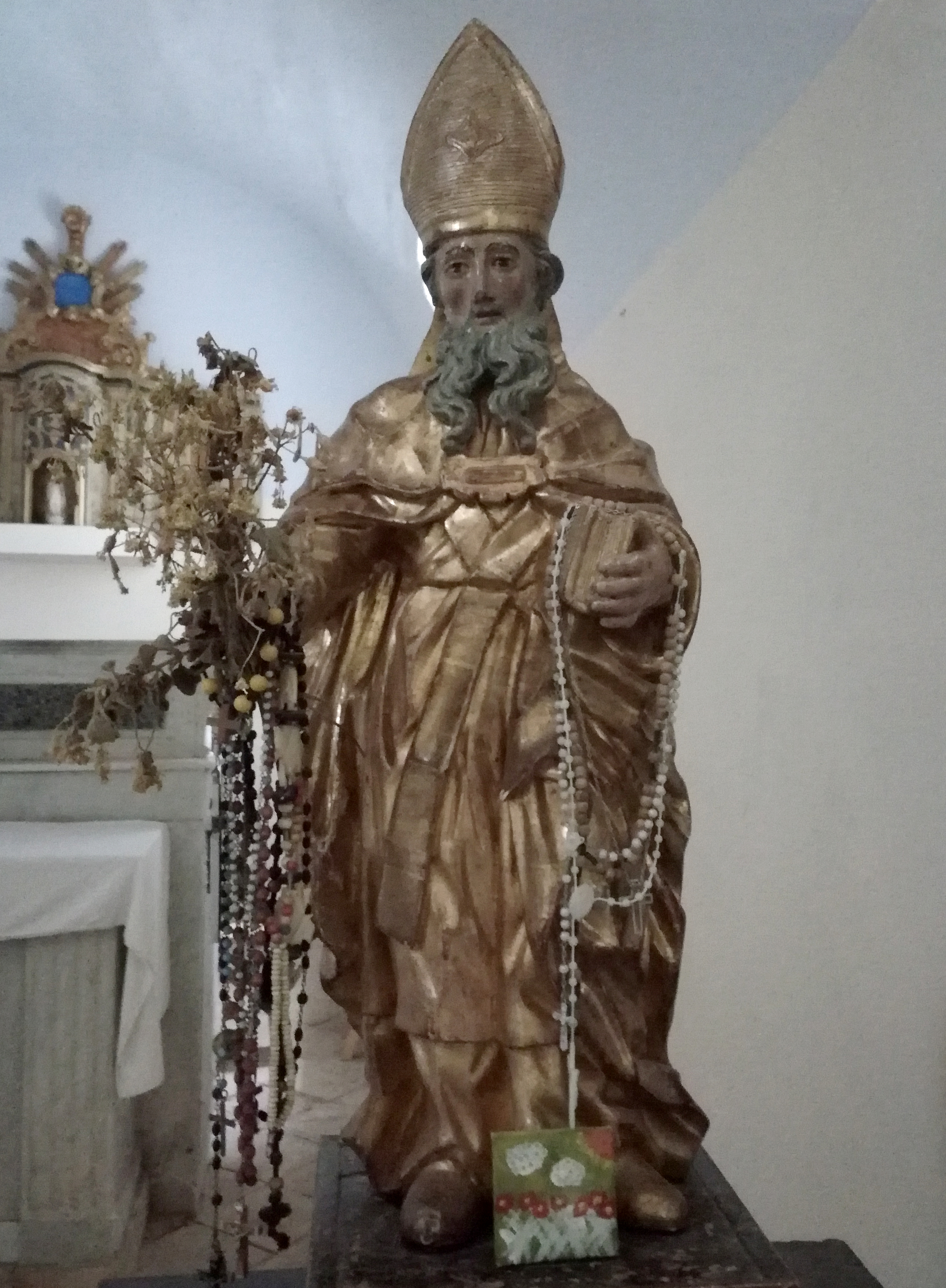
- Born: Vaison-la-Romaine
- Died: ~579
- Venerated in: Roman Catholic Church
- Major shrine: Vaison-la-Romaine
- Feast: 15 February
- Patronage: Vaison-la-Romaine

Quinidius (French: Quenin; died 15 February c. 579) was a French hermit, deacon, and bishop venerated as a saint.

== Life ==
He was born at Vaison-la-Romaine to a noble Christian family. When his mother was pregnant with Quinidius, she made a pilgrimage to the tomb of Trophimus of Arles, where an angel reportedly appeared to her and prophesied that her son would lead many people to beatitude. As a young man, he became a hermit near Toulon and then at Lérins Abbey to devote himself to a life of prayer and asceticism. For a time, he lived as a hermit near Camps-la-Source.

Esteemed for his piety, he was recalled to his natal town by Theodosius, Bishop of Vaison. He was made an archdeacon. As such, he signed the resolutions of the 5th Synod of Arles on behalf of his bishop in 552; shortly afterwards, with the approval of King Childebert I, he became coadjutor to the aged Theodosius with the right of succession.

After the death of Theodosius in 556, Quinidius became Bishop of Vaison, and achieved a reputation for charity and fairness. The Avignon martyrology presents him as a charitable and zealous pastor. He spent a good deal of his time taking care of the sick, children, the elderly and prisoners. He had churches and hospices built, and participated in the Councils of Paris of 558 and 573. He resisted the claims of the patrician Mummolus, conqueror of the Lombards, who felt that the bishop had not shown him sufficient respect.

== Death and veneration ==
At his death, his body was placed under the main altar of the cathedral of Vaison. Quinidius' sarcophagus in the Old Cathedral in Vaison-la-Romaine was soon the scene of numerous reported miracles. As a result, Benedictines came to Vaison and built an abbey on the site of today's St-Quenin chapel. The apse seems to date from the 8th century; it is one of the oldest in France.

When the Saracens invaded, the monks took the head to the monastery in Mauriac in the Auvergne, the rest of the relics were hidden and thus saved. A sarcophagus unearthed in the cathedral in 1950 likely contain the possible relics of Quinidius. He was officially registered in the catalogue of saints in 1205 during the papacy of Innocent III at the request of Rambaud Flotte, bishop of the city.

Quinidius is a patron saint of the town of Vaison-la-Romaine; his feast day is 15 February.
