= François Touvet =

Catholic bishop of Châlons, France

- Bishop of Fréjus-Toulon
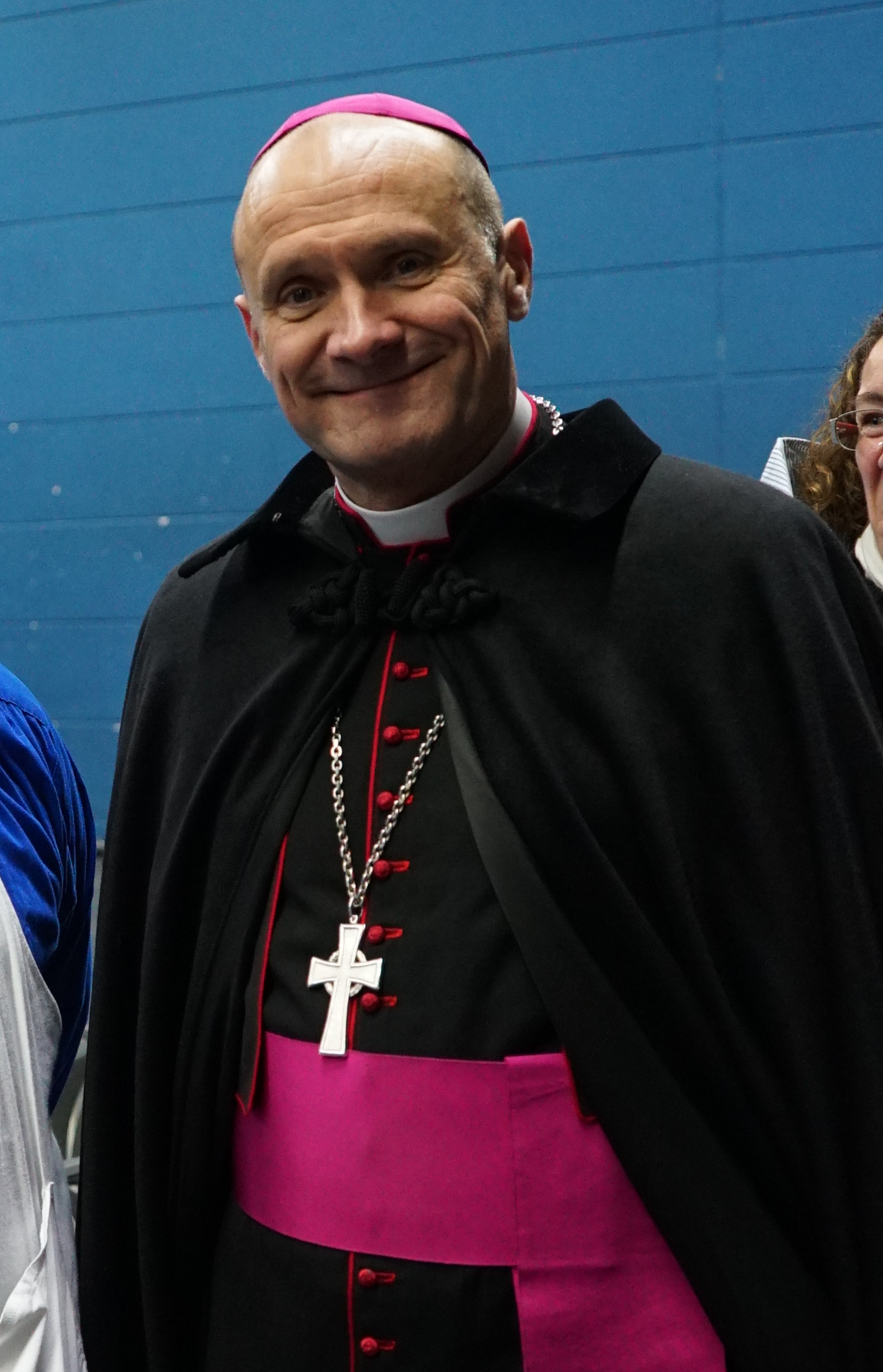
- Touvet in 2017
- Church: Catholic Church
- Diocese: Diocese of Fréjus-Toulon
- Appointed: 7 January 2025
- Predecessor: Dominique Rey
- Previous posts: Coadjutor Bishop of Fréjus-Toulon (2023-2025); Bishop of Châlons (2015-2023)

Orders
- Ordination: 28 June 1992 by Michel Coloni
- Consecration: 28 February 2016 by Thierry Jordan

Personal details
- Born: 13 May 1965 (age 61) Paris, France
- Coat of arms

François Touvet (born 13 May 1965) is a French Catholic prelate who became Bishop of Fréjus-Toulon in 2025 after serving for more than a year as coadjutor there. He was previously Bishop of Châlons from 2015 to 2023.

== Biography ==
François Touvet was born in Paris on 13 May 1965 into a family of navy officers. He is the brother of Laurent Touvet, a senior civil servant, and the brother-in-law of General Pierre de Villiers.

He attended the Lycée Saint-Louis-de-Gonzague and the Saint-Cyr military academy before studying in England for a year. He entered the seminary of Paray-le-Monial and continued his studies in Besançon and Lyon. After interrupting his studies to fulfill his military service obligations, he obtained his master's degree in theology at the Catholic University of Lyon in 1992.

He was ordained a priest for the Archdiocese of Dijon on 28 June 1992. He was parochial vicar in Is-sur-Tille until 1996, then part of a team of priests serving the parish complex of Selongey. For years he was religious advisor to the Scouts and Guides of Europe and chaplain to the Unitary Scouts of France. From 1999 to 2004, he was parish priest of Châtillon-sur-Seine and Coteaux-de-Haute-Seine, and from 1996 to 2002 diocesan chaplain of the Eucharistic Youth Movement. He was dean of Val-de-Seine from 2001, and from 2002 he was parish priest of the parish of Montigny-sur-Aube and episcopal vicar for the northern zone of the archdiocese. He was vicar general of the archdiocese of Dijon from 2004 to 2010. He joined the Diocese of Langres in 2010 where he was parish priest of the cathedral and dean of the diocese from 2010 to 2015. He was also episcopal vicar for the southern region of the diocese from 2011 to 2014, then vicar general of the diocese of Langres in 2014–2015, and parish priest of Chaumont in 2015. He also served as chaplain to units of the French army from 2011 to 2015.

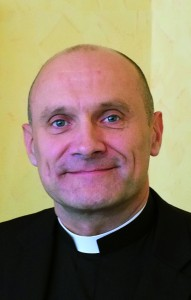
Touvet in 2014

On 23 December 2015, Pope Francis appointed him bishop of Châlons. He received his episcopal consecration at Saint-Étienne Cathedral in Châlons-en-Champagne on 28 February 2016 from Thierry Jordan, archbishop of Reims, assisted by Gilbert Louis, bishop emeritus of Châlons and Joseph de Metz-Noblat, bishop of Langres. He was one of the youngest bishops in France.

Within the Bishops' Conference of France, Touvet was a member of the Commission for the Liturgy and Pastoral Sacraments from 2017 to 2021 and interim president of the French Association of Pontifical Missionaries in 2020/21. In 2021, he became president of the Council for Communications.

On 25 June 2022, Cardinal Jozef De Kesel, Archbishop of Mechelen-Brussels, appointed him administrator of the Community of the Word of Life–a community marked by "spiritual abuse and sexual violence"–until its dissolution on 30 June 2023.

On 21 November 2023, he was named coadjutor bishop of the diocese of Fréjus-Toulon. He was assigned most of the authority of an ordinary, rather than the role of an auxiliary which is customary for a coadjutor, specifically "the special powers of the diocesan government in the areas of administration, management of the clergy, training of seminarians and priests, support of institutes of consecrated life, societies of apostolic life, and associations of the faithful".

He was seated in Toulon on 10 December. He announced an end to the Vatican's restrictions on ordinations in the Diocese that were set on 28 April 2022, and he announced that priestly ordinations are scheduled for 21 January and 29 June 2024.

Touvet succeeded as bishop when Pope Francis accepted his predecessor's resignation on 7 January 2025.
