= Joseph Madec =

French prelate

Joseph Théophile Louis Marie Madec
- Bishop of Diocese of Fréjus-Toulon (emeritus)
- Church: Roman Catholic Church
- See: Roman Catholic Diocese of Fréjus-Toulon
- In office: 1983–2000
- Predecessor: Gilles-Henri-Alexis Barthe
- Successor: Dominique Marie Jean Rey
- Previous post: Prelate

Orders
- Ordination: 5 April 1947

Personal details
- Born: 15 March 1923 Ploërmel, Morbihan, France
- Died: 6 February 2013 (aged 89) Noyal-Pontivy, Morbihan, France

Joseph Théophile Louis Marie Madec (15 March 1923 – 6 February 2013) was a French Prelate of the Roman Catholic Church.

Madec was born in Ploërmel, and ordained a priest on 5 April1947. Madec was appointed bishop of the Diocese of Fréjus-Toulon on 8 February 1983, and consecrated on 10 April 1983. Madec was the bishop of Diocese of Fréjus-Toulon until his retirement on 16 May 2000.
