= Lérins Abbey =

Cistercian monastery on the island of Saint-Honorat

Coordinates: 43°30′23″N 7°2′51″E

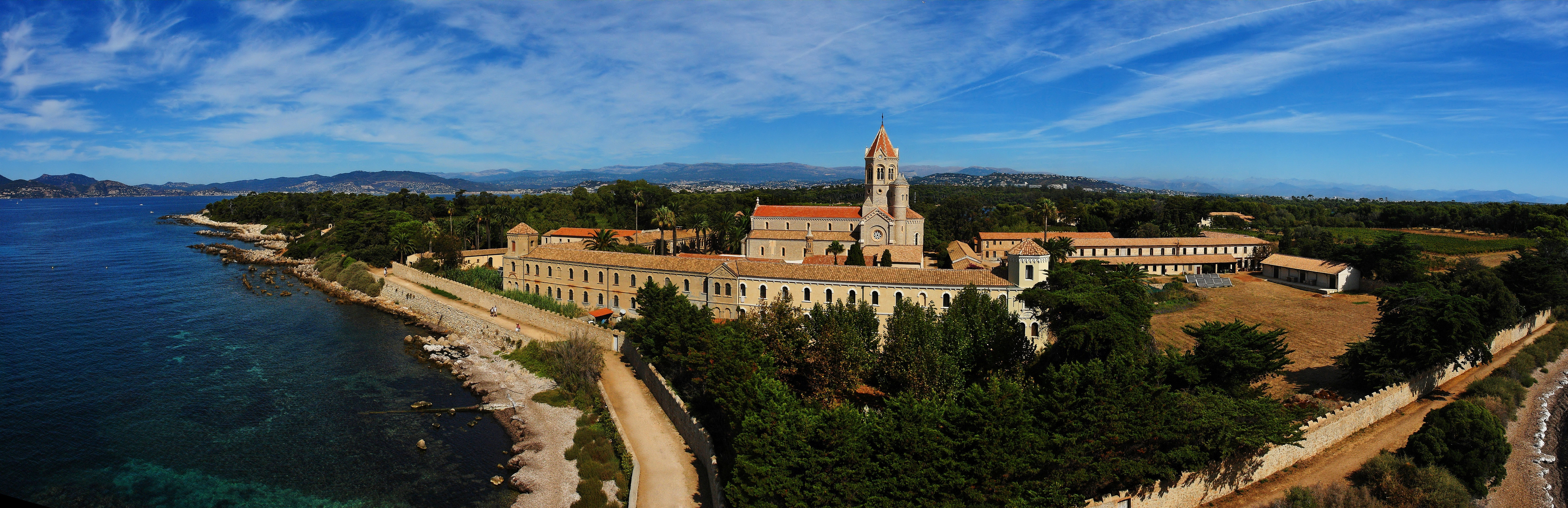
Church and monastery of the Lérins Abbey. Panoramic picture taken from the fortified monastery.

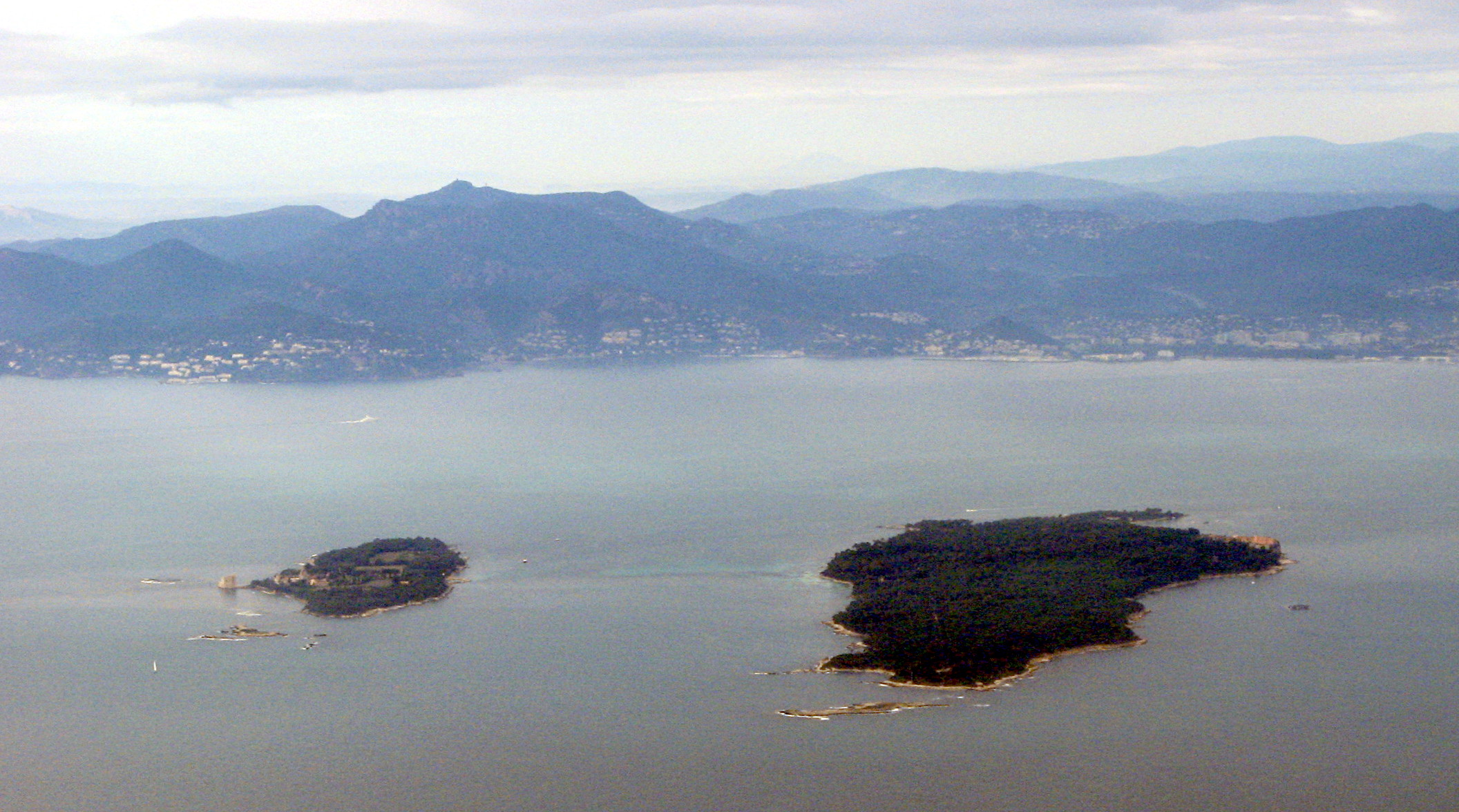
The Lérins Islands with Saint-Honorat on the left

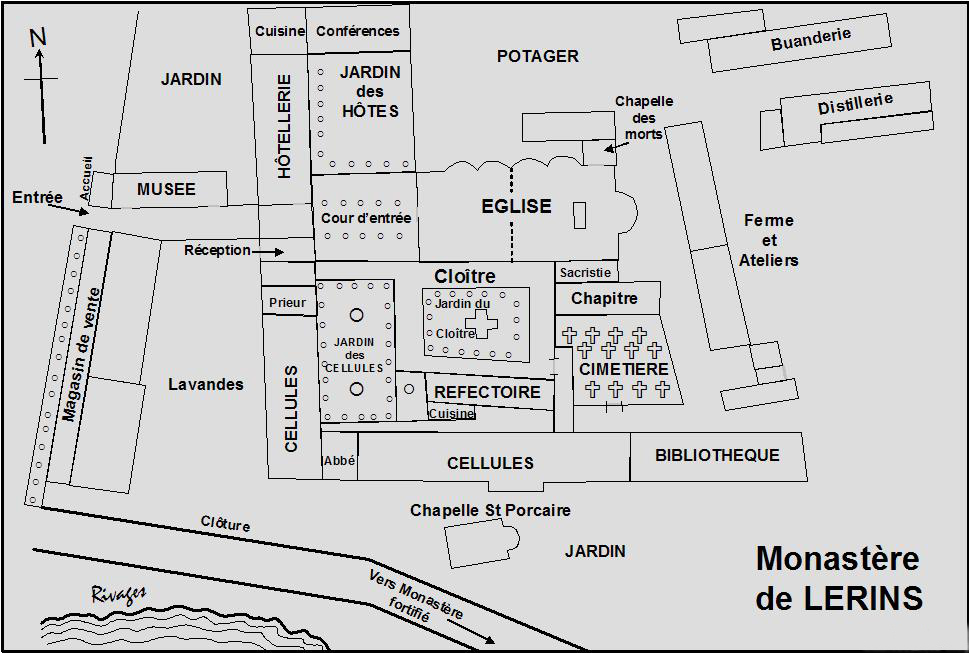
Plan of Lérins Abbey.

Lérins Abbey (pronounced [leʁɛ̃]) is a Cistercian monastery on the island of Saint-Honorat, one of the Lérins Islands, on the French Riviera, with an active monastic community.

There has been a monastic community there since the 5th century. The construction of the current monastery buildings began around 1073. Today the monks cultivate vineyards and produce wine and liqueur.

== History ==
=== First foundation ===
The island, known to the Romans as Lerina, was uninhabited until Saint Honoratus, a disciple of a local hermit named Caprasius of Lérins, founded a monastery on it at some time around the year 410. According to tradition, Honoratus made his home on the island, intending to live as a hermit, but found himself joined by disciples who formed a monastic community around him. They came from all parts of Roman Gaul and from Brittany. John Cassian had a high opinion of the monastery of Lérins and had close ties with it.

During the fifth, sixth, and seventh centuries, the abbey's influence was considerable. In 426, St. Maximus was elected Abbot and remained for seven years until he was appointed the first documented bishop of the Ancient Diocese of Riez. The second Abbot increased the renown of the cloister by his miracles and sanctity. There is also a tradition that Saint Patrick, patron saint of Ireland, studied here in the fifth century, and during the sixth century, Saint Quinidius was a monk at Lérins.

The abbey provided three bishops for the diocese of Arles: Honoratus himself, followed by Hilary and Cesarius in the fifth and sixth centuries, respectively. Faustus, also a monk of Lérins, succeeded Maximus as bishop of Riez. The next known abbot was Porcarius I in the period 488–510.

One of the Church's most famous authors Vincent of Lérins dwelt in this monastery in the 5th century.

Saint Nazarius (Saint Nazaire), the fourteenth abbot of Lérins, probably during the reign of the Merovingian Clotaire II (584–629), successfully combatted the remnants of paganism on the southern coast of France, overthrew a sanctuary of Venus near Cannes, and founded on its site a convent for women, later destroyed by the Saracens in the eighth century.

In the 630s, Saint Agricola of Avignon was a monk at Lérins before being called to become bishop of Avignon.

Over the following centuries, monastic life on the island was interrupted on several occasions by raids, mostly attributable to Saracens. Around 732, many of the community, including the abbot, Saint Porcarius, were massacred on the island by invaders. It is said that many of the monks escaped because Porcarius had been warned of the attack by an angel and had sent them to safety.

=== Second foundation ===
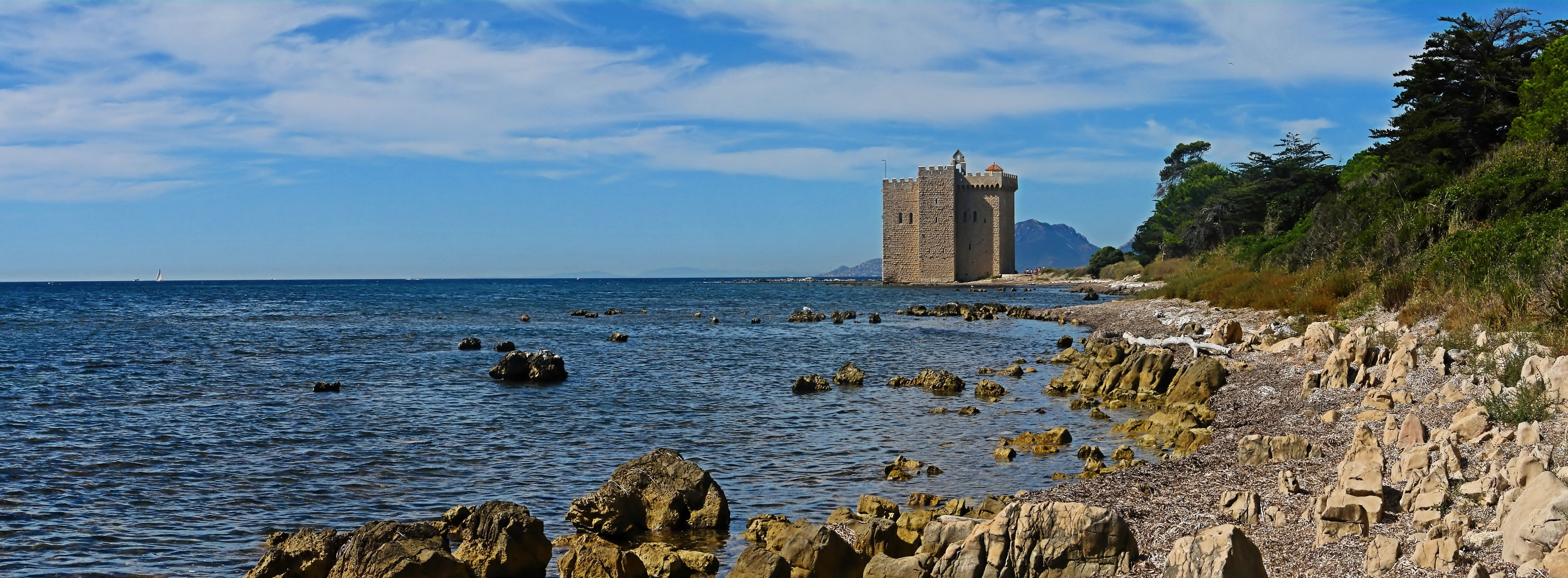
Panoramic view of the fortified monastery.

During the Middle Ages, the monks were obliged to take an active part in defending the coasts against incursions of the Moors of Algeria, and a fortified monastery was built between the eleventh and fourteenth centuries.

In medieval times, the island became a very popular place of pilgrimage. This was encouraged by the writings of Raymond Féraud, a monk who composed a mythological life of Honoratus.

The abbey was a strategically important site during the Franco-Spanish wars of the sixteenth and seventeenth centuries. In 1635, the island was captured by the Spanish and the monks were expelled. They returned from exile in Vallauris two years later, when the French retook the island. The monastery continued to suffer from Spanish and Genoese attacks. The number of monks dwindled to four, and, in the pre-revolutionary climate, the monastery was disestablished in 1787. During the French Revolution, the island became state property and was sold to the wealthy actress Mademoiselle de Sainval, who lived there for twenty years.

=== Third foundation ===
In 1859, the island was bought by the Bishop of Fréjus, who sought to re-establish a religious community there. Ten years later, a Cistercian community was founded, which has remained there since. The monks cultivate their own vegetables and now get most of their electricity from numerous solar panels. The annual grape harvest festival in early September is a key event in the calendar.

== See also ==
- List of Carolingian monasteries
- Carolingian architecture
- Carolingian art
