= Porcarius II =

Benedictine abbot

St. Porcarius, O.S.B.

Abbot and martyr
- Died: c. 732; Abbey of Lérins, Liguria, Kingdom of the Lombards
- Venerated in: Roman Catholic Church, Orthodox Church (Diocese of Fréjus)
- Major shrine: Abbey of Lérins, Île de Saint-Honorat, Alpes-Maritimes, France
- Feast: 12 August

Porcarius II, in French Porchaire II or Porcaire II (died c. 732), was a Benedictine abbot who governed the Abbey of Lérins at a time when the monastery included over 500 monks.

According to tradition, around the year 732, Porcarius was warned by an angel in a vision that the abbey was about to be attacked by barbarians. Immediately, the abbot heeded the warning and sent off to safety by ship all the young students at the abbey and 36 of the younger monks. When the ship left fully loaded, he set about preparing the rest of the community for death and prayed with them for courage.

The community was attacked by the Saracens, probably Moors from Spain or North Africa, and were massacred, except four who were taken into slavery. Their feast day is celebrated in the Diocese of Fréjus on 12 August.
