= Roman Catholic Diocese of Toulon =

Coordinates: 43.12°N 5.93°E

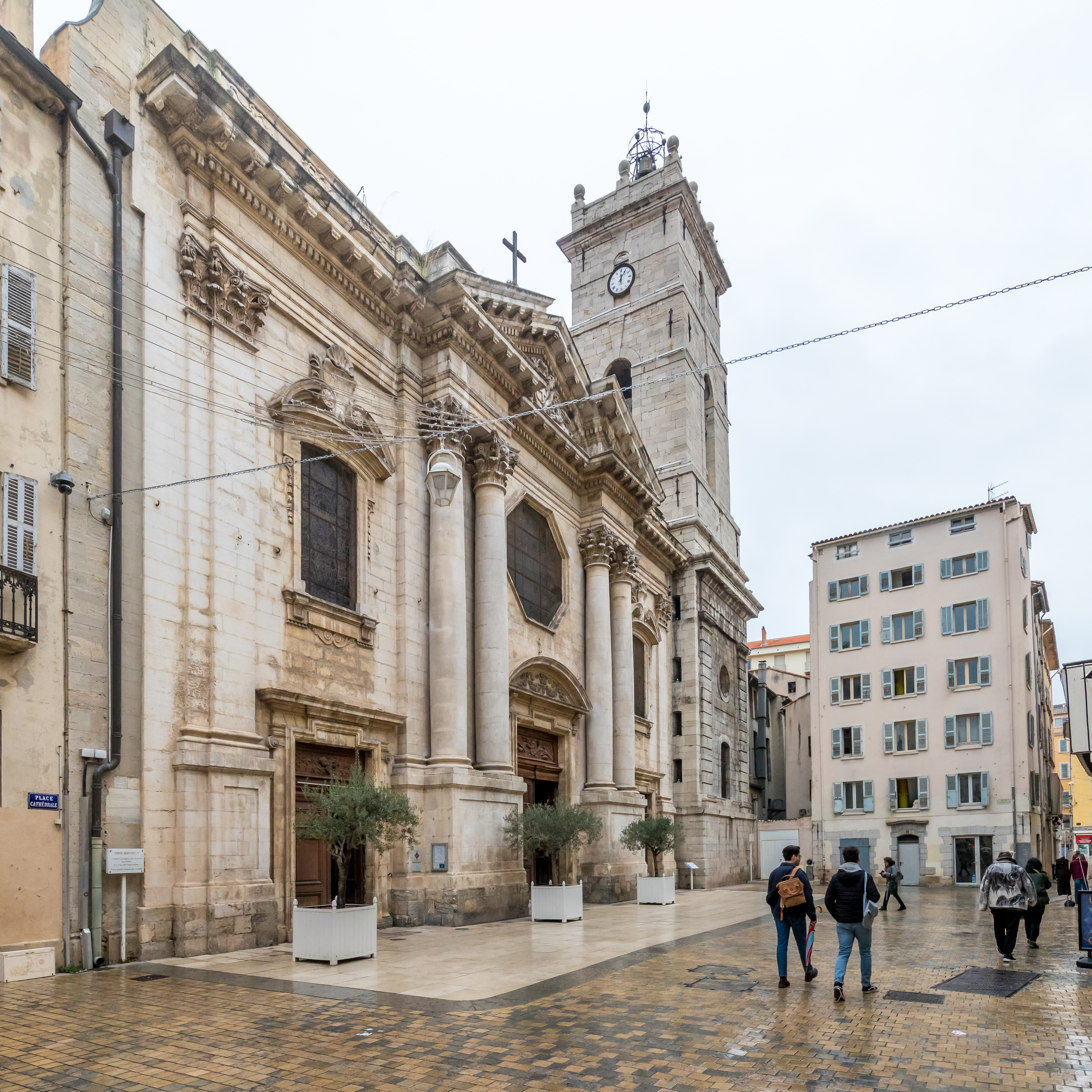
Toulon Cathedral

The former French Roman Catholic Diocese of Toulon existed until the Concordat of 1801. Its seat was in Toulon.

== Bishops ==
=== To 1000 ===
- c. 451: Honoratus
- † c. 472: Saint Gratien
- 524–549: Cyprian
- 549–c. 554: Palladius (or Palais)
- 573–585: Desiderius
- c. 601: Mennas
- c. 614: Hiltigisus (de Tholosa ?)
- Gandalmarus
- c. 879: Eustorgius
- c. 899: Armodus

=== 1000 to 1300 ===
- 1021–1056: Théodad de Jandal
- 25 January 1056 – 1079: Wilhelm I.
- 1096–1110: Ariminus or Aiminus
- 1117 – September 1165: Wilhelm II.
- 1168–1183: Pierre I. Isnard
- 1183–1201: Desiderius
- c. 1201: Ponce Rausianus
- Guillaume III. de Soliers
- 1212–1223: Stephanus
- 1223–1232: Jean I. des Baux
- 1234–c. 1257: Rostaing
- 1257–c. 1266: Bertrand (?)
- 1266–1277: Gualterus (or Gauthier) Gaufredi
- 17 May 1279 – 1289: Jean II.
- 1293–1311: Raymond I. de Rostaing

=== 1300 to 1500 ===
- 1314–c. 1317: Ponce II.
- 1317–1323: Elzéar de Glandèves
- 1324–1325: Hugues I.
- 1325–1326: Pierre II. de Guillaume
- 1328–1329: Fulco
- 1329–1345: Jacques de Corvo
- 9 December 1345 – 1357: Hugues II. Le Baille
- 1 April 1357 – 1358: Pierre III.
- 1358–1364: Raymond II. de Daron
- 1364–1368: Guillaume IV. de La Voulte
- 1368–1380: Jean III. Stephani de Girbioto
- 1395 – 4 or 5 September 1402: Pierre IV de Marville
- 1403–1409: Jean IV.
- 13 February 1411 – 27 July 1427: Vitalis
- 1428–1434: Nicolas I. Draconich
- 1437–1454: Jean V. Gombard
- 1454–1483: Jean VI. Huet
- 1491–1496: Jean VII. de Mixon
- 1497–1498: Guillaume Briçonnet
- 1498–1516: Denis Briçonnet

=== 1500 to 1800 ===
- 1516: Niccolò Fieschi
- 1516 – 3 September 1518: Philos Roverella
- 3 September 1518 – 1524: Niccolò Fieschi (second time)
- Claudio Tolomei ?
- 22 July 1524 – 1548: Cardinal Agostino Trivulzio (Augustin or Auguste Trivulce)
- 1548–1559: Cardinal (1557) Antonio Trivulzio (iuniore)
- c. 1560–1566: Cardinal (1586) Girolamo della Rovere (Jérôme de La Rovère)
- 1566–1571: Thomas Jacomel
- 1571 or 1572 – 1588: Guillaume VI. du Blanc
- 1588–1599: Vacant
- 1599 – 2 May 1626: Aegidius de Septres or de Soystres
- 1628–1639: Auguste II. de Forbin
- 6 May 1640 – 1659: Jacques II. Danès de Marly
- 12 January 1659 – 5 December 1662: Pierre V. Pingré
- 1664 – 29 April 1675: Louis I. de Forbin d'Opède
- 1675 – 15 November 1682: Jean VIII. de Vintimille du Luc (previously bishop of Digne (1669–1675)
- 1684–1712: Armand-Louis Bonin de Chalucet
- 15 August 1712 – 12 September 1737: Louis II. de La Tour du Pin de Montauban
- 1737 – 16 April 1759: Louis-Albert Joly de Chouin
- 12 September 1759 – 1786: Alexandre Lascaris de Vintimille
- 13 August 1786 – 1801: Elléon de Castellane-Mazangues

== See also ==
- Catholic Church in France
- List of Catholic dioceses in France

== Bibliography ==
=== Reference Sources ===
- Gams, Pius Bonifatius (1873). Series episcoporum Ecclesiae catholicae: quotquot innotuerunt a beato Petro apostolo. Ratisbon: Typis et Sumptibus Georgii Josephi Manz. pp. 548–549. (Use with caution; obsolete)
- Eubel, Conradus, ed. (1913). Hierarchia catholica, Tomus 1 (second ed.). Münster: Libreria Regensbergiana. p. 301. (in Latin)
- Eubel, Conradus, ed. (1914). Hierarchia catholica, Tomus 2 (second ed.). Münster: Libreria Regensbergiana. p. 175.
- Eubel, Conradus, ed. (1923). Hierarchia catholica, Tomus 3 (second ed.). Münster: Libreria Regensbergiana.
- Gauchat, Patritius (Patrice) (1935). Hierarchia catholica IV (1592-1667). Münster: Libraria Regensbergiana. p. 219.
- Ritzler, Remigius; Sefrin, Pirminus (1952). Hierarchia catholica medii et recentis aevi V (1667-1730). Patavii: Messagero di S. Antonio.

=== Studies ===
- Jean, Armand (1891). Les évêques et les archevêques de France depuis 1682 jusqu'à 1801 (in French). Paris: A. Picard. p. 520.
- Pisani, Paul (1907). Répertoire biographique de l'épiscopat constitutionnel (1791-1802) (in French). Paris: A. Picard et fils.
