= Honoratus =

Archbishop of Arles

Saint Honoratus
- Coverpage woodcut from La vida de sant Honorat arquebisbe de Arles

Hermit, abbot and bishop
- Born: c. 350; Northern Gaul
- Died: 6 January 429; Arles, Diocese of the Seven Provinces, Gaul, Western Roman Empire
- Venerated in: Roman Catholic Church; Eastern Orthodox Church
- Feast: 16 January
- Attributes: represented as a bishop over the island of Lérins with a phoenix below, or drawing water from a rock with his mitre near him
- Patronage: against drought; against misfortune; against rain; for rain

Honoratus (French: Saint Honorat; c. 350 – 6 January 429) was the founder of Lérins Abbey who later became an early Archbishop of Arles. He is honored as a saint in the Catholic and Eastern Orthodox Churches.

== Life ==
Honoratus was born in the north of Gaul to a consular Roman family. He received an outstanding education. He converted to Christianity with his brother Venantius and embarked with him from Marseille about 368, under the guidance of a holy person named Caprasius, to visit the holy places of Palestine and the lauræ of Syria and Egypt. The sudden death of Venantius at Methone, Achaia prevented the pious travellers from going further. They returned to Gaul through Italy, and, after having stopped at Rome, Honoratus went on into Provence. Encouraged by Leontius of Fréjus, he took up his abode on the wild Lérins Island today called the Île Saint-Honorat, with the intention of living there in solitude.

=== Lerins ===
Numerous disciples soon gathered around Honoratus, including Lupus of Troyes, Eucherius of Lyon, and Hilary of Arles. Thus was founded the Monastery of Lérins, which has enjoyed so great a celebrity status and which was, during the 5th and 6th centuries, a nursery for illustrious bishops and remarkable ecclesiastical writers. His Rule of Life was chiefly borrowed from that of St. Pachomius. It is believed St. Patrick trained there for his missionary work in Ireland.

=== Archbishop of Arles ===
Honoratus' reputation for sanctity throughout the southeastern portion of Gaul was such that in 426 after the assassination of Patroclus, Archbishop of Arles, he was summoned from his solitude to succeed to the government of the diocese, which the Arian and Manichaean beliefs had greatly disturbed. He appears to have succeeded in re-establishing order and orthodoxy, while still continuing to direct from afar the monks of Lérins.

He died in the arms of Hilary, one of his disciples and probably a relative, who was to succeed him in the See of Arles. Hilary wrote the Sermo de Vita Sancti Honorati probably around 430.

Honoratus' various writings have not been preserved, nor has the Rule which he gave to the solitaries of Lérins. John Cassian, who had visited his monastery, dedicated to him several of his "Conferences".

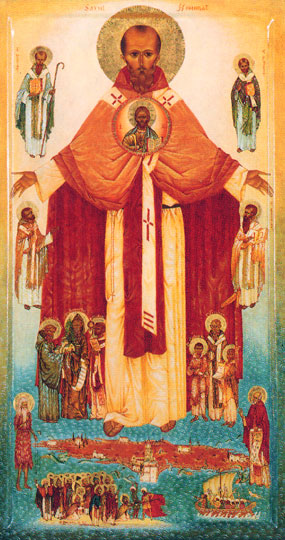
Saint Honorat d'Arles

== La Vida de Sant Honorat ==
In the Middle Ages, Honaratus was the object of a pilgrimage in the Arles region, especially around Lérins Abbey, because of the writings in Occitan of Raymond Féraud (or Raimon Feraud), a monk who composed a hagiographical life for him around 1300 in Roquesteron.

== Legacy ==
One of the Lérins islands near the Antibes off the French Riviera is now called St. Honorat in his honor.

== Gallery ==
Saint Honoratus

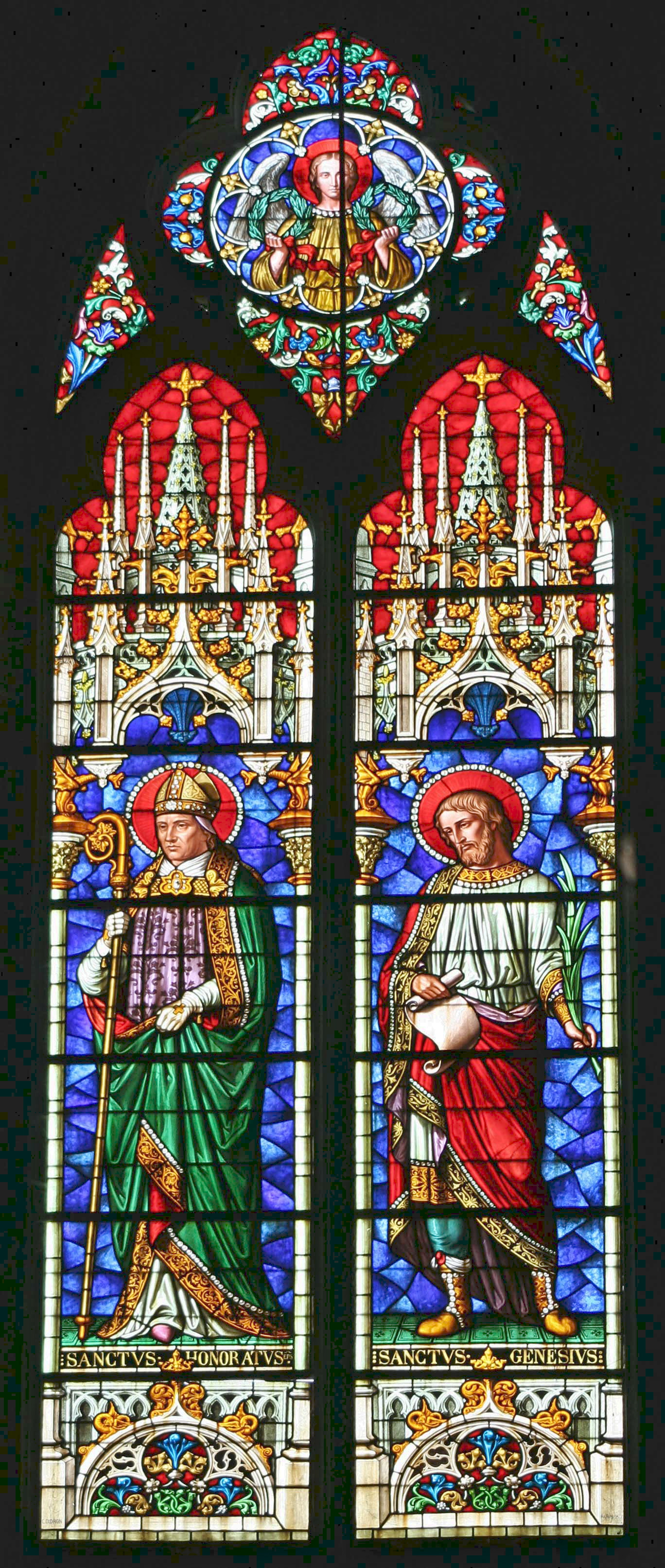
Saint Honoratus is on the left, Cathedral of Saint Trophimus, Arles.

== See also ==
- Saint Honoratus, patron saint archive

== Sources ==
- Attwater, Donald and Catherine Rachel John. The Penguin Dictionary of Saints. 3rd edition. New York: Penguin Books, 1993. ISBN 0-14-051312-4.
