= Hilary of Arles =

Bishop of Arles

Saint Hilary of Arles
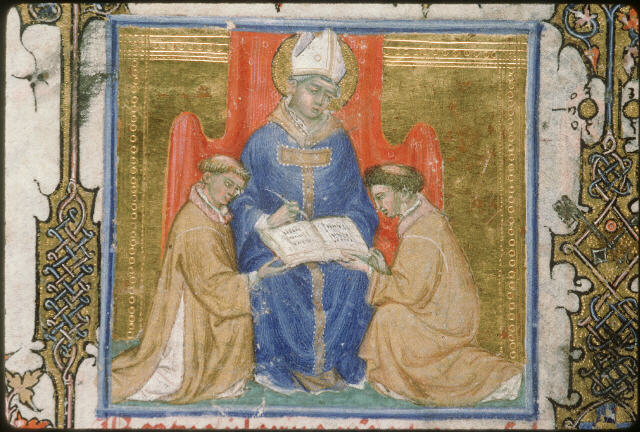

Bishop of Arles
- Born: ~403 AD; Roman Gaul
- Died: ~449 AD; Arles, Kingdom of the Visigoths
- Venerated in: Roman Catholic Church; Eastern Orthodox Church
- Canonized: Pre-Congregation
- Feast: 5 May
- Patronage: Arles, invoked against snake bites

Hilary of Arles, also known by his Latin name Hilarius (c. 403–449), was a bishop of Arles in Southern France. He is venerated as a saint in the Eastern Orthodox Church and Roman Catholic Church, with 5 May being his feast day.

== Life ==
In his early youth, or the 420s, Hilary joined the abbey of Lérins which was, at the time, presided over by his kinsman Honoratus. Hilary seems to have been living in Dijon before this, although other authorities believe he came from Belgica, or Provence. Hilary may have been a relative or "even the son" of the Hilarius who had been prefect of Gaul in 396 and of Rome in 408.

Hilary succeeded his kinsman Honoratus as bishop of Arles in 429. Following the example of Augustine of Hippo, he is said to have organized his cathedral clergy into a "congregation," devoting a great part of their time to social exercises of asceticism. He held the rank of metropolitan bishop of Vienne and Narbonne, and attempted to exercise the sort of primacy over the church of south Gaul, which seemed implied in the vicariate granted to his predecessor Patroclus of Arles (417).

Hilary deposed the bishop of Besançon, Chelidonus, for ignoring this primacy, and for claiming a metropolitan dignity for Besançon. An appeal was made to Rome, and Pope Leo I used it, in 444, to extinguish the Gallican vicariate headed by Hilary, thus depriving him of his rights to consecrate bishops, call synods, or oversee the church in the province. The pope also secured the edict of Valentinian III, so important in the history of the Gallican church, which freed the Church of Vienne from all dependence on that of Arles. These papal claims were made imperial law, and violation of them were subject to legal penalties. Léon Clugnet suggests that the dispute arose from the fact that the respective rights of the Court of Rome and of the metropolitan were not sufficiently clearly established at that time, and that the right of appeal to the pope was not explicitly enough recognized.

Traditionally, he is said to have died on the 5th of May 449 at the age of 48. Following his death, Hilary's name was introduced into the Roman martyrology.

== Writings ==
During his lifetime Hilary had a great reputation for learning and eloquence as well as for piety; his extant works (Vita S. Honorati Arelatensis episcopi and Metrum in Genesin) compare favourably with any similar literary productions of that period.

A poem, De providentia, usually included among the writings of Prosper of Aquitaine, is sometimes attributed to Hilary of Arles.

== Sources ==
- Clugnet, Léon (1910). "St. Hilary of Arles" . In Herbermann, Charles (ed.). Catholic Encyclopedia. Vol. 7. New York: Robert Appleton Company.
