= List of candidates for the Man in the Iron Mask =

The Man in the Iron Mask (French: L'Homme au Masque de Fer; died 19 November 1703) was an unidentified prisoner of state during the reign of Louis XIV of France (1643–1715). The strict measures taken to keep his imprisonment secret resulted in a long-lasting legend about his identity. Warranted for arrest on 19 July 1669 under the name of "Eustache Dauger", he was apprehended near Calais on 28 July, incarcerated on 24 August, and held for 34 years in the custody of the same jailer, Bénigne Dauvergne de Saint-Mars, in four successive French prisons, including the Bastille. When he died there on 19 November 1703, his inhumation certificate bore the pseudonym of "Marchioly".

The true identity of this prisoner remains a mystery, even though it has been extensively debated by historians, and various theories have been expounded in numerous books and articles over the last three centuries. The ordeal of this prisoner has also been the subject of fictional works such as novels, poems, plays and films. In the third edition (2004) of his book on the subject, French historian Jean-Christian Petitfils collated a list of 52 candidates whose names had been either mentioned as rumours in contemporaneous documents or proposed in printed works between 1669 and 1992.

== Selected list of historical candidates ==
The following is an incomplete list of individuals identified by historians and other authors as possible candidates for the Man in the Iron Mask. To be included in this list, the candidate must have been proposed or discussed in a published work.

The list is initially organized in chronological order of publication date, with sortable columns, as follows:

- Year – the publication year of the work proposing the candidate (sortable column)
- Candidate – the person proposed as a candidate (sortable column)
- Vital dates – the candidate's dates of birth and death, "Unknown", or blank for imaginary candidates (sortable column)
- Notes – supplementary details about the candidate (sortable column)
- Author(s) – the name(s) of the author(s) who proposed, or published documents on, the candidate (sortable column)
- Ref. – one or more references to works where the candidate was proposed or discussed (this column is not sortable).

| Year | Candidate | Vital dates | Notes | Author(s) | Ref. |
|---|---|---|---|---|---|
| 1669 | A Marshall of France or President of Parlement | | Saint-Mars reporting to Louvois on rumours about the prisoner. | Saint-Mars (letter to Louvois on 31 August) | |
| 1670 | "I tell them tall tales to make fun of them." | | Evidence of Saint-Mars himself initiating rumours when asked about the prisoner. | Saint-Mars (letter to Louvois on 12 April) | |
| 1687 | "Everyone tries to guess who my prisoner might be." | | Saint-Mars reporting rumours to Louvois. | Saint-Mars (letter to Louvois on 3 May) | |
| 1687 | "... all the people that one believes dead are not." | 16 January 1616 – 25 June 1669 | Saint-Mars hinting at François, Duke of Beaufort, quoted in a letter attributed to Louis Fouquet. Beaufort died at the Siege of Candia. | Louis Fouquet (letter in Nouvelles Écclésiastiques on 4 September) | |
| 1688 | François, Duke of Beaufort | 16 January 1616 – 25 June 1669 | Saint-Mars reporting rumours to Louvois. Beaufort died at the Siege of Candia. | Saint-Mars (letter to Louvois on 8 January); François Joseph de La Grange-Chancel | |
| 1688 | Richard Cromwell | 4 October 1626 – 12 July 1712 | Saint-Mars reporting rumours to Louvois. Richard Cromwell died in Cheshunt. | Saint-Mars (letter to Louvois on 8 January) | |
| 1688 | Henry Cromwell | 20 January 1628 – 23 March 1674 | Saint-Mars reporting rumours to Louvois. Henry Cromwell died in Wicken. | Saint-Mars (letter to Louvois on 8 January) | |
| 1711 | An English milord | | Mentioned in a letter from Elizabeth Charlotte, Princess Palatine, to her aunt, Sophia of Hanover. | Eduard Bodemann | |
| 1719 | "A man jailed as a schoolboy aged 12-13 for writing verses against the Jesuits." | | Answer given in c. 1703 to Renneville by Bastille turnkey Antoine Rû and surgeon Abraham Reilhe, who had both attended to the prisoner. | Constantin de Renneville | |
| 1745 | Louis, Count of Vermandois | 2 October 1667 – 18 November 1683 | Died at the Siege of Kortrijk. | (Anonymous); Henri Griffet | |
| 1768 | James, Duke of Monmouth | 9 April 1649 – 15 July 1685 | Beheaded on Tower Hill, London. | Germain-François Poullain de Saint-Foix | |
| 1770 | Ercole Antonio Mattioli | 1 December 1640 – April 1694 | Died soon after his transfer from Pignerol to the island of Sainte-Marguerite. Mattioli was the prime candidate for several 19th-century historians. | Joseph-Louis, Baron de Heiss; Pierre Roux-Fazillac; Louis Dutens; Joseph Delort; George Agar-Ellis; Théodore Iung; Marius Topin; Frantz Funck-Brentano | |
| 1771 | A brother of Louis XIV | | An elder, illegitimate brother by an unknown father. | Voltaire; Jean-Louis Carra; Quintin Craufurd | |
| 1783 | Yevtokiatsi Avedick | 1657 – 21 July 1711 | Died in Paris and buried at the Saint-Sulpice cemetery. | Pierre, Chevalier de Taulès | |
| 1789 | Nicolas Fouquet | 27 January 1615 – 23 March 1680 | Died in Pignerol. Remains initially stored at the convent of Église Sainte-Claire in Nice and reburied in the family crypt at the Église Sainte-Marie-des-Anges in Paris, on 28 March 1681. | (Anonymous); Paul Lacroix; Pierre-Jacques Arrèse | |
| 1789 | A brother of Louis XIV | | A twin brother. | Michel de Cubières; Jean-Louis Soulavie; Alexandre Dumas; Marcel Pagnol | |
| 1790 | A brother of Louis XIV | | An elder, illegitimate brother fathered by George Villiers, 1st Duke of Buckingham; supposedly born in 1626. | Pierre-Hubert Charpentier & Louis-Pierre Manuel | |
| 1791 | A brother of Louis XIV | | A younger brother, fathered by Mazarin. | Jean Baptiste De Saint-Mihiel; Charles-Henri, baron de Gleichen | |
| 1867 | A spy named Guibert, brought to Pignerol by Nicolas Catinat | | This was Catinat himself, disguised as a new prisoner, sent by Louvois on a secret mission to capture Casale. | Jules Loiseleur | |
| 1869 | Louis de Rohan-Guéméné a.k.a. Chevalier de Rohan | 1635 – 27 November 1674 | Leader of a conspiracy to overthrow Louis XIV. Beheaded at the Bastille. | (Anonymous, in Journal de Mâcon) | |
| 1872 | Louis Oldendorf | Unknown | Leader of a conspiracy against Louis XIV. Had several aliases but real identity unknown. Arrested in 1673 and sent to the Bastille, then released without trial. | Théodore Iung | |
| 1879 | Sébastien de Penancoët de Kéroualze | 1646 – 15 March 1671 | Died on board his ship Monarque. | François Ravaisson | |
| 1883 | Molière | 15 January 1622 – 17 February 1673 | Died soon after performing on stage. | Anatole Loquin | |
| 1890 | A valet, anonymised as "Eustache Dauger" | Unknown – 19 November 1703 | Confirmed as the 'man in the mask' by Mongrédien in 1952. Many theories have been proposed for his real identity, including that of Eustache Dauger de Cavoye, which was disproved by Mongrédien in 1953. | Jules Lair; Aymard Le Pippre; Andrew Lang; Emile Laloy; Alberto Pittavino; Georges Mongrédien; Marcel Pagnol; Jean-Christian Petitfils; Paul Sonnino; Josephine Wilkinson | |
| 1893 | General Vivien Labbé de Bulonde | 15 November 1624 – 1709 | Imprisoned at the Citadel of Pignerol on 10 July 1691 and released by order of the king on 11 December 1691. | Étienne Bazeries & Émile Burgaud | |
| 1893 | A Dominican friar, anonymised as "Lapierre" | after 1600 – 1694 | Died in Pignerol. | Domenico Carutti di Cantógno | |
| 1893 | A son from a prominent family | | Assumed to have committed a hideous crime. | Fernand Bournon | |
| 1899 | A son of Louis XIV and Henrietta of England | | A rumour circulating during the 18th century. | Maurice Boutry | |
| 1899 | A son of Henrietta of England and the Count of Guiche | | A rumour circulating during the 18th century. | Maurice Boutry | |
| 1899 | A son of Henrietta of England and her page | | A rumour circulating during the 18th century. | Maurice Boutry | |
| 1899 | A son of Christina of Sweden and Monaldeschi | | A rumour circulating during the 18th century. | Maurice Boutry | |
| 1903 | Martin, a French valet of Paul Roux de Marcilly | Unknown | Martin's extradition from England to France was cancelled by Foreign Minister Hugues de Lionne on 13 July 1669. | Andrew Lang; Aimé-Daniel Rabinel; Marcel Pagnol; Peter Curran | |
| 1904 | James de la Cloche | c. 1644 – 7 September 1669 | Giacoppo Stuardo died in Naples. | Edith Carey; Marcel Pagnol | |
| 1908 | Dom Giuseppe Prignani | after 1600 – end of 1678 | Died in Rome. | Arthur Barnes | |
| 1914 | Jacques Bretel de Grémonville | 1 March 1625 – 29 November 1686 | Died at Lyre Abbey. | Franz Scheichl | |
| 1931 | Eustache Daugé | Unknown | Son of Daugers (Louis XIV's butler), and nephew of Canon Daugé, chaplain to the Archbishop of Sens. | Emile Laloy | |
| 1932 | Eustache Dauger de Cavoye, as himself | 30 August 1637 – Late 1680s | Son of François d'Oger de Cavoye and Marie de Sérignan. Died at the Prison Saint-Lazare in Paris. | Maurice Duvivier | |
| 1934 | Marc de Jarrige de la Morelhie | 1626 – 14 December 1680 | Son-in-law of Pardoux Gondinet, physician of Anne of Austria. Morelhie died in Saint-Yrieix-la-Perche. | Pierre Vernadeau | |
| 1954 | Eustache Dauger de Cavoye, as half-brother of Louis XIV | 30 August 1637 – Late 1680s | Imaginary son of Louis XIII and Marie de Sérignan. Died at the Prison Saint-Lazare in Paris. | Rupert Furneaux | |
| 1955 | Louis XIV's illegitimate father | | An imaginary, illegitimate grandson of Henry IV, coupled with Anne of Austria. | Hugh Ross Williamson, supporting a theory by Lord Quickswood | |
| 1974 | Eustache Dauger de Cavoye, as half-brother of Louis XIV | 30 August 1637 – Late 1680s | Imaginary son of Anne of Austria and François d'Oger de Cavoye. Died at the Prison Saint-Lazare in Paris. | Marie-Madeleine Mast, Harry Thompson | |
| 1978 | Henri II, Duke of Guise | 4 April 1614 – 2 June 1664 | Died in Paris. | Camille Bartoli | |
| 1978 | Queen Maria Theresa's dwarf black page, Nabo | Unknown | Alleged father of Louise Marie-Thérèse. | Pierre-Marie Dijol | |
| 2005 | Charles de Batz d'Artagnan | c. 1611 – 25 June 1673 | Died at the Siege of Maastricht. | Roger MacDonald | |
| 2024 | A brother of Philippe d'Orléans | | Imaginary son of Louis XIII and Anne of Austria. | Sarah B. Madry | |
