= Man in the Iron Mask (disambiguation) =

The Man in the Iron Mask was an unidentified prisoner of state in France under the reign of Louis XIV.

Man in the Iron Mask may also refer to:

== Film and television ==
- The Man in the Iron Mask (1923 film), a German silent film directed by Max Glass
- The Man in the Iron Mask (1928 film), a 1928 British film directed by George J. Banfield and Leslie Eveleigh
- The Man in the Iron Mask (1939 film), an American black-and-white film directed by James Whale
- The Man in the Iron Mask (1977 film), a British TV film
- The Man in the Iron Mask (1985 film), an Australian animated TV film
- The Man in the Iron Mask (1998 film), a British/American film directed by Randall Wallace
- The Man in the Iron Mask, also known as The Mask of Dumas, a 1998 American film directed by William Richert

=== Television episodes ===
- "The Man in the Iron Mask", a 1953 episode of the TV series Monodrama Theater
- The Man in the Iron Mask, a 1968 British TV series
- "The Man in the Iron Mask", Timewatch season 7, episode 3 (1988)
- "The Man in the Iron Mask", History's Mysteries season 12, episode 19 (2000)
- "The Man in the Iron Mask", Mystery Files season 1, episode 11 (2010)
- "The Man in the Iron Mask", Ghost Hunters International season 3, episode 8 (2012)
- "Man in the Iron Mask", Mysteries at the Castle season 1, episode 1c (2014)

== Literature ==
- L’Homme au Masque de Fer, an 1804 book by Jean-Joseph Regnault-Warin
- L'Homme au Masque de Fer, an 1837 book by Paul Lacroix
- The Man in the Iron Mask, the third part of the novel The Vicomte of Bragelonne: Ten Years Later by Alexandre Dumas
- The Man in the Iron Mask, an 1873 book by George Gordon McCrae
- L'Homme au Masque de Fer, a 1930 novel by Arthur Bernède
- The Man in the Iron Mask: An Historical Detective Investigation, a 1987 non-fiction book by Harry Thompson

=== Comics ===
- Saint Germaine: The Man in the Iron Mask, a 1999 one-shot comic book from Caliber Comics
- The Man in the Iron Mask, a 2007–2008 comic book limited series adapted from the novel published by Marvel Comics through its Marvel Illustrated imprint

== Other uses ==
- "Man in the Iron Mask", a song by Billy Bragg originally released on the album Life's a Riot with Spy vs Spy
- "Man in the Iron Mask", nickname of American college football player Jay Berwanger
- The Man in the Iron Mask, a 1832 play by Thomas James Serle

== See also ==
- Iron Mask (disambiguation)
