= Iron Mask =

Iron Mask may refer to:

== Film and television ==
- The Iron Mask, a 1929 American adventure film
- Le Masque de fer, a 1962 French film also released as The Iron Mask
- Viy 2: Journey to China, a 2019 Russian-Chinese adventure film released in English-speaking countries as Iron Mask or The Iron Mask

=== Television episodes ===
- "The Iron Mask", Rambo: The Force of Freedom episode 35 (1986)
- "The Iron Mask", Stars Over Hollywood episode 50 (1951)
- "The Iron Mask", The Cisco Kid season 4, episode 20 (1954)

== Literature ==
- The Iron Mask, an 1847 penny dreadful by Elizabeth Caroline Grey
- Le Masque de fer, a 1923 play by Maurice Rostand
- Le Masque de fer ou l'amour prisonnier, a 1929 novel by Renée Dunan
- Le secret du Masque de Fer, a historical essay by French novelist Marcel Pagnol, first published in 1965 as Le Masque de fer and updated in 1973
- Le Masque de fer, a 1999–2001 French comic series written by Patrick Cothias
- Le masque de fer, a 2009 book by Michel Vergé-Franceschi
- "Iron Mask": The Story of Harry Bensley's "Walking Round the World" Hoax, a 2016 book by Steve Holland about Harry Bensley

== Other uses ==
- Iron Mask (band), a Belgian power metal band
- Iron Mask, a Marvel Comics character

== See also ==
- Man in the Iron Mask (disambiguation)
- Behind the Iron Mask, the working title of the 1979 German-Austrian adventure film The Fifth Musketeer
- Behind the Iron Mask, a 2005 musical by John Robinson
- Lady in the Iron Mask, a 1952 American adventure film directed by Ralph Murphy, freely based on The Vicomte de Bragelonne
- The Prisoner of the Iron Mask, a 1962 Italian-French swashbuckler film by Francesco De Feo
- “The Monster in the Iron Mask”, a comic story featured in Tales of Suspense #31 (July 1962)
