= Poullain =

Poullain is a French surname. Notable people with the surname include:

- Fabrice Poullain, French footballer
- François Poullain de la Barre
- Frankie Poullain (born 1967), bass player
- Germain-François Poullain de Saint-Foix, French writer and playwright
