= Gabriel Daniel =

French historian (1649–1728)

Gabriel Daniel (8 February 1649 – 23 June 1728) was a French Jesuit historian.

== Biography ==
Born in Rouen, he was educated by the Jesuits, entered the order at the age of eighteen, and became superior at Paris.

== Works ==
He is best known by his Histoire de France depuis l'établissement de la monarchie française (first complete edition, 1713), which was republished in 1720, 1721, 1725, 1742, and (the last edition, with notes by Henri Griffet) 1755–1760. Daniel published an abridgment in 1724 (English trans., 1726), and another abridgment was published by Dorival in 1751.

Though full of prejudices which affect his accuracy, Daniel had the advantage of consulting valuable original sources. His Histoire de la milice française, etc. (1721) is considered superior to his Histoire de France. Daniel also wrote a reply to Pascal's Provincial Letters, entitled Entretiens de Cléanthe et d'Eudoxe sur les lettres au provincial (1694); two treatises on Descartes's theory as to the intelligence of the lower animals, and other works.

Daniel's work Voyage du Monde de Descartes has been noted as an early example of science fiction, as the text takes the form of a narrative exploration of Cartesian philosophy, metaphorically conceived as a voyage, with the last section detailing the protagonists' journey to a third heaven to explore Descartes's theory of vortices.
