= Ercole Antonio Mattioli =

Italian politician

- Born: 1 December 1640; Valenza, Italy
- Died: 1694 (aged 53–54); Île Sainte-Marguerite, France
- Occupation: Politician

Ercole Antonio Mattioli (1 December 1640 – 1694) was an Italian politician, who was a minister of Duke Charles IV of Mantua. He was kidnapped and imprisoned by Louis XIV of France. He has been associated with the Man in the Iron Mask.

== Biography ==
Mattioli was born at Valenza, in what is now the province of Alessandria. He worked as a minister of Charles IV, Duke of Mantua, who, as Marquess of Montferrat, possessed the strategic fortress of Casale Monferrato. Louis XIV wanted the fortress and was willing to purchase it for 100,000 crowns. Since a French occupation would be unpopular, secrecy was needed until the deal was finalised.

Mattioli successfully negotiated the trade and in gratitude, Louis XIV rewarded him lavishly. However, when the French were about to occupy the castle, Mattioli revealed the secret deal to the governments of Austria, Savoy, Spain and Venice, possibly for additional rewards. Louis XIV had to cancel the deal and withdraw though he eventually took control of Casale two years later.

In 1679, Louis XIV had his French envoy d'Estrades kidnap Mattioli and take him to France. There Mattioli was imprisoned in the fortress of Pinerolo, where he was eventually put into solitary confinement. By 1680 he was described as nearly mad. His manservant was also kidnapped and held with him.

Ercole Antonio Mattioli died in 1694 while incarcerated on the island of Sainte-Marguerite.

== Man in the Iron Mask ==
Another prisoner at Pignerol was Eustache Dauger, the so-called Man in the Iron Mask, which some have said was actually made of black velvet cloth. Dauger was in the custody of a man named Saint-Mars and was held in the prisons of which Saint-Mars was governor.

It has been suggested that Mattioli himself was the masked prisoner, and this was a popular theory during much of the 19th century. Since the prisoner is known to have been buried under the name "Marchioly", many believe that this is proof enough that he was the man in the mask. However, letters sent by Saint-Mars indicate that he was only held at Pignerol and Sainte-Marguerite; never at the Bastille, where the Man in the Iron Mask was held during the last years of his life.
