= Behind the Iron Mask =

- Promotional Picture
- Music: John Robinson
- Lyrics: John Robinson
- Book: Colin Scott, Melinda Walker
- Premiere: August 2, 2005
- Productions: 2005 West End

Behind the Iron Mask is a musical with a book by Colin Scott and Melinda Walker and music and lyrics by John Robinson. It played a short run at the Duchess Theatre in London after receiving unanimously unfavorable reviews. Especially unique, this show has a cast of only three actors but runs for two hours. The show draws inspiration from Alexandre Dumas' Man in the Iron Mask.

== Musical numbers ==
Act I

1. Tristesse
2. Antiphonal Madness
3. There Is Sweet Music
4. Possession - Prelude
5. Do You Look for Love?
6. Pearls, Pearls, Pearls
7. Touch Me - Prelude
8. Darkness
9. The Enigma
10. You'll Never Leave Here
11. Possession

Act II

1. Prelude to Love/Can't You See
2. Turmoil
3. Who's the Prisoner Here?
4. Touch Me
5. Take Me as I Am
6. I'm a Lady/In a Single Moment
7. Shadowland of Life/Touch Me - Reprise
8. Tristesse
9. Where Are You?
10. If All This Means Love

== Original cast ==
Role	West End (2005)
The Gypsy	Sheila Ferguson
The Prisoner	Robert Fardell
The Jailer	Mark Kerratcher
