= Germain-François Poullain de Saint-Foix =

French writer and playwright

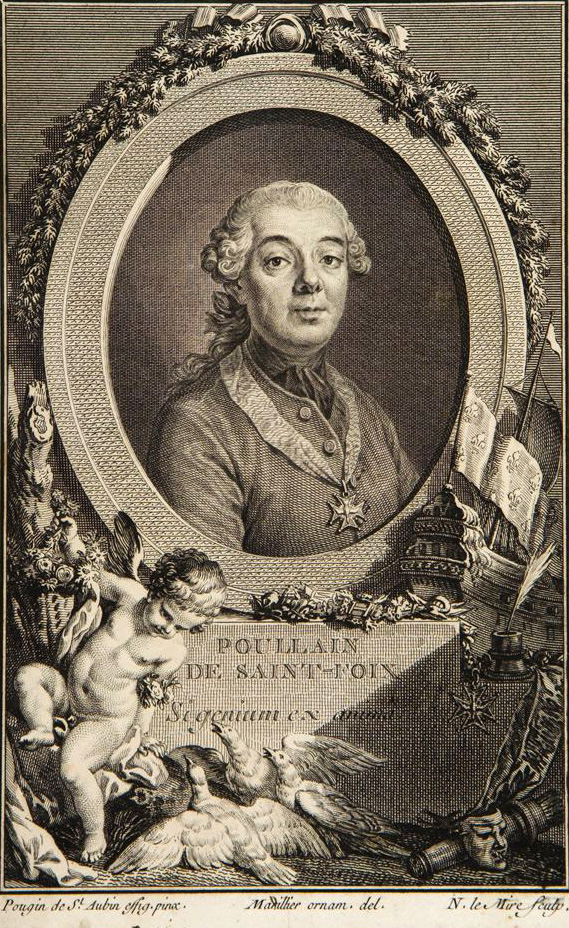
- Born: 5 February 1698; Rennes, France
- Died: 25 August 1776 (aged 78); Paris, France
- Other names: Writer, playwright

Germain-François Poullain de Saint-Foix (5 February 1698 – 25 August 1776) was an 18th-century French writer and playwright.

== Life ==
He served with the musketeers until he was 36, distinguishing himself at Guastalla in 1734. He then left the army and purchased a post as "maître des eaux et forêts" in Rennes. He published his first comedy, Pandore, in 1721 and from 1740 devoted himself entirely to writing, setting up in Paris and becoming a fashionable author there. He wrote 20 comedies in all.

In 1764 he was made historian of the ordre du Saint-Esprit. The jurist Auguste-Marie Poullain-Duparc was his brother.

== Works ==
- Pandore (1721)
- Lettres d’une Turque à Paris (1730), in imitation of the Persian Letters by Montesquieu - reissued under the titles Lettres de Nedim Koggia (1732) and Lettres turques (1760)
- L’Oracle (1740)
- Deucalion et Pyrrha (1741)
- L’Île sauvage (1743)
- Le Sylphe (1743)
- Les Grâces (1744)
- Julie (1746)
- Egérie (1747)
- Les Veuves turques (1747)
- Les Métaphores (1748)
- La Colonie (1749)
- Le Rival supposé (1749)
- Les Hommes (1753)
- Essais historiques sur Paris, 5 vol. (London, 1754–1757)
- Le Financier (1761)
- Origine de la Maison de France (1761)
- Histoire de l’Ordre du Saint-Esprit (1767)
- Lettres au sujet de l'homme au masque de fer (1768)

== Sources ==
- Jean de Viguerie, Histoire et dictionnaire du temps des Lumières, Robert Laffont, "Bouquins" collection, Paris, 1995 ISBN 2-221-04810-5
