= Man in the Iron Mask =

Unidentified prisoner in 17th-century France

- Died: 19 November 1703; Bastille, Paris, France
- Resting place: Saint-Paul cemetery, Paris
- Other names: "Eustache Dauger"; "La Tour"; "L'ancien prisonnier"; "Marchioly"
- Known for: Mystery regarding his identity
- Status: Died in prison
- Penalty: Life imprisonment
- Wanted by: Louvois, for Louis XIV

Details
- Locations: Pignerol Dungeon (1669–1681); Exilles Fort (1681–1687); Île Sainte-Marguerite Fort (1687–1698); Bastille Bertaudière Tower (1698–1703)
- Date apprehended: 28 July – 24 August 1669

The Man in the Iron Mask (French: L'Homme au Masque de Fer; died 19 November 1703) was an unidentified prisoner of state during the reign of Louis XIV of France (1643–1715). The strict measures taken to keep his imprisonment secret resulted in a long-lasting legend about his identity. Named for arrest on 19 July 1669 as "Eustache Dauger", his lettre de cachet was signed by Louis XIV on 28 July. He was apprehended near Calais soon thereafter, incarcerated on 24 August, and held for 34 years in the custody of Bénigne Dauvergne de Saint-Mars in four successive French prisons, including the Bastille. He died there on 19 November 1703, and his burial certificate bore the name of "Marchioly", leading several historians to conclude that the prisoner was Italian diplomat Ercole Antonio Mattioli.

His true identity remains a mystery, even though it has been extensively debated by historians, and various theories have been expounded in numerous books, articles, poems, plays, and films. During his lifetime, it was rumoured that he was a Marshal of France or a President of Parlement, the Duke of Beaufort, or a son of Oliver Cromwell, and some of these rumours were initiated by Saint-Mars himself. Among the oldest theories is one proposed by French philosopher and writer Voltaire, who claimed in his Questions sur l'Encyclopédie (1771) that the prisoner was an older, illegitimate brother of Louis XIV. Other writers believed that he was the King's twin or younger brother. In all, more than 50 candidates, real and hypothetical, have been proposed by historians and other authors aiming to solve the mystery.

What little is known about the prisoner is based on contemporaneous documents uncovered during the 19th century, mainly some of the correspondence between Saint-Mars and his superiors in Paris, initially Louvois, Louis XIV's secretary of state for war. These documents show that the prisoner was labelled "only a valet" and that he was jailed for "what he was employed to do" before his arrest, and for "what he saw." Legend has it that no one ever saw his face, as it was hidden by a mask of black velvet cloth, later misreported by Voltaire as an iron mask. Official documents reveal, however, that the prisoner was made to cover his face only when travelling between prisons after 1687, or when going to prayers within the Bastille in the final years of his incarceration; modern historians believe that the measure was imposed by Saint-Mars solely to increase his own prestige, thus causing persistent rumours to circulate about this seemingly important prisoner.

In 1932, French historian Maurice Duvivier proposed that the prisoner was Eustache Dauger de Cavoye, a nobleman associated with several political scandals of the late 17th century. This solution, however, was disproved in 1953 when previously unpublished family letters were discovered by French historian Georges Mongrédien, who concluded that the enigma remained unsolved.

He has been the subject of many works of fiction, most prominently Alexandre Dumas's 1850 novel The Vicomte of Bragelonne: Ten Years Later—the final installment of his D'Artagnan saga—which portrays the prisoner as Louis XIV's identical twin. In 1840, Dumas had first presented a review of the popular theories about the prisoner extant in his time in the chapter "L'homme au masque de fer," published in the eighth volume of his non-fiction Crimes Célèbres. This approach was adopted by many subsequent authors, and speculative works have continued to appear on the subject.

== The prisoner "whose name is not spoken" ==
=== Arrest and imprisonment – Pignerol (1669–1681) ===
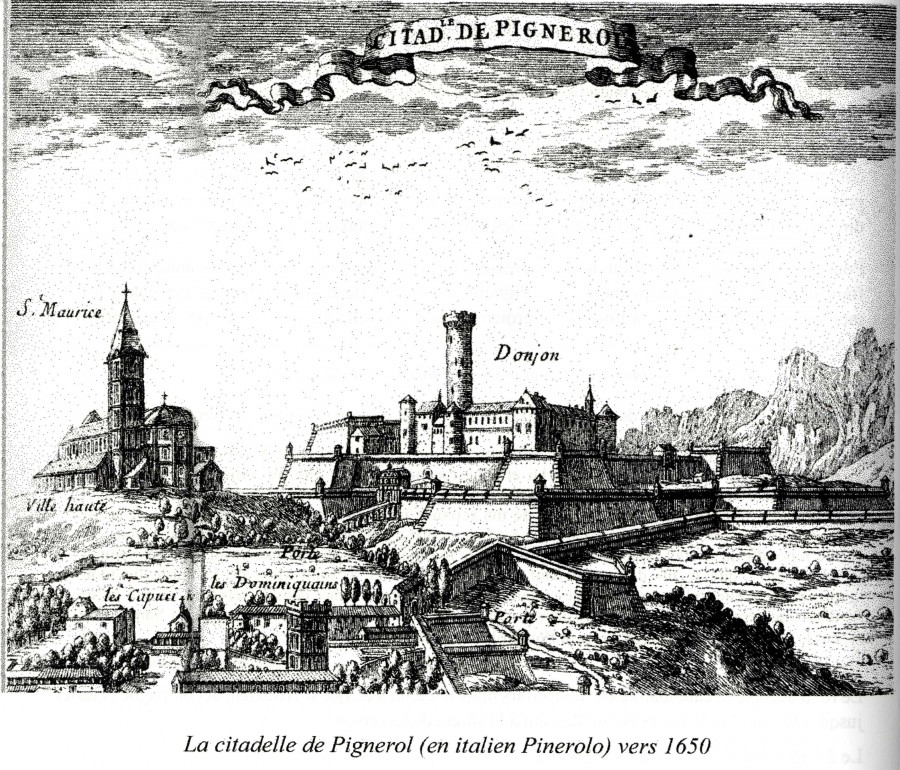
Etching of the citadel and dungeon of Pignerol, in Piedmont, Italy (c. 1650)

The earliest surviving records of the masked prisoner are from 19 July 1669, when Louis XIV's minister, the Marquis de Louvois, sent a letter to Bénigne Dauvergne de Saint-Mars, governor of the prison of Pignerol (which at the time was part of France). In his letter, Louvois informed Saint-Mars that a prisoner named "Eustache Dauger" was due to arrive in the next month or so.

He instructed Saint-Mars to prepare a cell with multiple doors, one closing upon the other, which were to prevent anyone from the outside listening in. (Note: Noone pointed out that Louvois was concerned Dauger should not communicate, rather than that his face should be concealed. Later, Saint-Mars elaborated upon instructions that the prisoner should not be seen during transportation. The idea of keeping Dauger in a velvet mask was Saint-Mars's own, and this practice began only after the prisoner's transfer to Sainte-Marguerite in 1687. Noone suggested that Saint-Mars adopted this measure solely to increase his self-importance. It was common practice at the time for aristocratic prisoners to hide their face behind a domino or Harlequin mask which covered the brow, cheeks and nose in order to avoid recognition during their term in jail, and thus save embarrassment to their families after release; by using this device, Saint-Mars was hinting that his prisoner was of high standing in society.) Saint-Mars was to see Dauger only once a day to provide food and whatever else he needed. Dauger was to be told that if he ever spoke of anything other than his immediate needs he would be killed, but, according to Louvois, the prisoner should not require much since he was "only a valet". Historians have noted that the name "Eustache Dauger" was written in a handwriting different from that used in the rest of the letter's text, suggesting that a clerk wrote the letter under Louvois' dictation, while someone else, very likely Louvois, added the name afterward.

At the time of Louvois's letter, Dauger was still at liberty but probably being watched closely, since nine days elapsed before Louvois submitted Dauger's lettre de cachet for the King to sign on 28 July. Shortly thereafter, Dauger was arrested by Captain Alexandre de Vauroy, garrison commander of Dunkerque, and a small escort of three soldiers, who took him to Pignerol, where he arrived on 24 August. Evidence has been produced to suggest that the arrest was actually made in Calais and that not even the local governor was informed of the event—Vauroy's absence being explained away by his hunting for Spanish soldiers who had strayed into France via the Spanish Netherlands. The first rumours of the prisoner's identity (specifically as a Marshal of France) began to circulate at this point.

==== Saint-Mars's other prisoners ====
The dungeon at Pignerol was used to incarcerate men who had displeased Louis XIV or were considered an embarrassment to the state, and it usually held only a few important prisoners at a time. (Note: Petitfils published a complete list of all the prisoners Saint-Mars held at the four prisons he governed. In addition to the important prisoners of state, this list identifies 11 other individuals held at Pignerol, for example, including those who attempted the evasion of Fouquet (two in November 1669), and that of Lauzun (three in August 1672, and two the following month). These 11 individuals were not considered prisoners of state, and were in no way connected with Dauger; most were imprisoned for short periods of time, from a few days to a few months, and were either freed, transferred to other prisons, or condemned to death.)

- Saint-Mars's first prisoner of state at Pignerol was Nicolas Fouquet, Marquis of Belle-Île, a former superintendent of finances who had been arrested on 5 September 1661 and tried by order of Louis XIV on the charge of embezzlement. (Note: After arresting Fouquet on 5 September 1661, d'Artagnan and an escort of 100 musketeers took him to the Château d'Angers, where he arrived two days later. On 1 December 1661, he was transferred to the Château d'Amboise and, on 25 December, to the dungeon at the Château de Vincennes, where he arrived on the 31st. His trial began on 4 March 1662. On 30 May 1663, he was transferred to the Bastille. He was sentenced to life imprisonment on 22 December 1664 and taken to Pignerol five days later.) On 27 December 1664, after a long trial, Fouquet was transferred—by d'Artagnan leading a company of 100 musketeers—from the Bastille to Pignerol, where he arrived on 16 January 1665 and was lodged in the Angle Tower.

In 1665, Saint-Mars commanded a new compagnie franche, (Note: During the reign of Louis XIV, a compagnie franche ("free company") was an independent military unit not permanently attached to a specific regiment and receiving orders directly from the King via the Secretary of State for War, thus "freed" from some of the strict regulations and structure of the regular army, and able to operate more autonomously.) created solely to guard Fouquet, which comprised four officers (including three musketeers detached from their original corps), 11 non-commissioned officers and 50 soldiers.

- Two years after Dauger's arrival in August 1669, Saint-Mars's third prisoner was the Marquis de Lauzun, a favourite of Louis XIV, who had fallen from grace for lying to the King and insulting his mistress, Madame de Montespan. (Note: In the autumn of 1671, Marshall Antoine de Gramont, aged 67, resigned his post of Colonel of the prestigious Gardes Francaises and had hoped to hand it over to his eldest son, Armand de Gramont, Count of Guiche, but the King objected. Lauzun asked Madame de Montespan to intercede with the King and obtain the appointment for him, without revealing that she was doing so at his request. This she promised to do, but immediately told the King everything, adding that she would not grant the appointment if she were in his place, as the favours he had granted Lauzun deserved that the latter should behave with frankness. The King summoned Lauzun to an interview, to discuss all the possible aspirants to the post, then asked him whether he did not wish the post for himself. Lauzun assured the King he had not even thought of it, and repeated the lie when told Madame de Montespan had mentioned him as an aspirant. Before dismissing Lauzun, Louis said that he was astonished at the temerity he showed in lying to him with such impudence, and that he felt certain that he would never again believe anything he might say. Enraged, Lauzun went straight to Madame de Montespan and insulted her repeatedly. On 28 October 1671, La Gazette announced that Marshall de Gramont had resigned his post and that the King had appointed François d'Aubusson de La Feuillade in his place. In mid-November, Lauzun and Madame de Montespan had another heated disagreement, this time about who should replace Julie d'Angennes as Première dame d'honneur to the Queen, and Lauzun had once again heaped insults at Montespan. On hearing of this, the King angrily ordered Lauzun to apologise to Montespan within five days, which he failed to do.) (Note: Historians such as Noone believed that the motive for Lauzun's imprisonment was that he had become engaged to the Duchess of Montpensier, a cousin of Louis XIV known as la Grande Mademoiselle, without the King's consent. However, in December 1670, she had written to the King to inform him she intended to marry Lauzun, and in his letter of reply, Louis wrote that he would not coerce her in any way, but advised her to consider the matter well and to do nothing in a hurry. During an interview on Monday 15 December 1670, the King had received Lauzun's deputation (Marshall François de Créquy; Charles, duc de Montausier; Marshall César d'Albret; and Guy de Chaumont, Marquis de Guitry) and gave his consent to the marriage, only to change his mind four days later, after receiving strong objections from the Queen, Monsieur, Madame de Montespan and Louvois. Other historians wrote that Louis wanted Mademoiselle to leave part of her properties to the Duke of Maine, his illegitimate son with Madame de Montespan, and that incarcerating Lauzun proved a successful way of pressuring her to do so in exchange for Lauzun's freedom. The properties in question included: the principality of Dombes, the County of Eu, and the Duchy of Aumale; the latter two she had gifted to Lauzun in their contract of betrothal in December 1670, and he eventually relinquished ownership of these two properties in the autumn of 1681, six months after his release from Pignerol.) For this, Lauzun was arrested on 25 November 1671 and, with an escort of 100 musketeers led once again by d'Artagnan, was brought to Pignerol on 16 December of that year, and lodged in rooms directly under Fouquet's cell.

At that time, the strength of Saint-Mars's company was increased from 65 to 135 men, officers included.

- A Dominican monk, nicknamed Lapierre, was brought to Pignerol on 7 April 1674. He was a swindler, dabbling in alchemy, who had abused the trust of several ladies at court, including the wife of Louis de Lorraine, one of the Great Officers of the Crown of France and a member of the King's Household. Soon after his incarceration, Lapierre became insane, screaming hysterically, fouling his cell, and insulting his guards.
- In May 1676, Saint-Mars received a fifth prisoner, named Dubreuil, a private agent specialising in military espionage, who was discovered to be in the pay of the Austrian and Spanish governments as well as the French. Louvois had ordered his kidnapping on 25 February and Dubreuil was caught on 24 April.
- Another prisoner was Count Ercole Antonio Mattioli, an Italian diplomat who had double-crossed Louis XIV over the purchase of the important fortress town of Casale on the Mantuan border. Mattioli was kidnapped near Turin by a small team of French soldiers commanded by Nicolas Catinat, and incarcerated at Pignerol on 2 May 1679. Mattioli's Italian valet, named Rousseau, was also arrested and taken to Pignerol two days later. (French historian Jean-Christian Petitfils suggested that "Rousseau" might have been a francisation of the name "Rosso").

==== Dauger serves as a valet (1675–1680) ====
In his letters to Louvois, Saint-Mars describes Dauger as a quiet man, giving no trouble, "disposed to the will of God and to the King", compared to his other prisoners, who were always complaining, constantly trying to escape, or simply mad. Dauger was not always isolated from the other prisoners. Wealthy and important ones usually had manservants; for instance, Fouquet was granted the service of two men in 1667, called Champagne and La Rivière, (Note: La Rivière was Saint-Mars's own voluntary valet who had been re-assigned to the service of Fouquet in 1667, and who had expected to be released from service at some point. He was a hypochondriac suffering regularly from bouts of depression.) and Mattioli had been joined by his Italian valet, Rousseau, incarcerated with him in 1679. These servants, however, would become as much prisoners as their masters and it was thus difficult to find people willing to volunteer for such an occupation. When Lauzun arrived in December 1671, Saint-Mars could not find him a manservant, and therefore wrote to Louvois on 20 February 1672, suggesting that Dauger would prove a good valet for Lauzun. This request was turned down, and historians believe Louvois had reasons to keep these two men apart; perhaps they knew each other.

In 1674, Champagne died and, since La Rivière was often ill, Saint-Mars again applied for permission for Dauger to act as servant, this time for Fouquet. On 30 January 1675, Louvois gave permission for such an arrangement on strict condition that he was to serve Fouquet only while La Rivière was unavailable and that he was not to meet anyone else; for instance, if Fouquet and Lauzun were to meet, Dauger was not to be present. This injunction was reiterated by Louvois to Saint-Mars in a stern letter dated 11 March 1675. Fouquet was never expected to be released; thus, meeting Dauger was no great matter, but Lauzun was expected to be set free eventually, and it would have been important not to have him spread rumours of Dauger's existence or of secrets he might have known. Shortly thereafter, Dauger was moved from the Lower Tower to the Angle Tower, where he was lodged with La Rivière. The important fact that Dauger served as a valet to Fouquet strongly indicates he was born a commoner. (Note: Historians have also argued that 17th-century protocol made it unthinkable that a gentleman, let alone an aristocrat, would serve as a manservant, casting doubt on speculation that Dauger was in some way related to the King.)

On 23 November 1678, Louvois wrote directly to Fouquet to inform him that the King was disposed to soften considerably the strictures of his incarceration, subject to Fouquet writing back to Louvois—without informing Saint-Mars of the contents of his reply—concerning whether Dauger had talked to him, Fouquet, in front of La Rivière, "about what he was employed to do before being brought to Pignerol". (Note: Petitfils mentioned that French historian Bernard Caire consulted the original draft of Louvois's letter and noticed that before writing "what he was employed to do", Louvois had initially written, then crossed out, the words: "what he saw" ("ce qu'il a vu").) From this revealing letter, French historian Mongrédien concluded that Louvois was clearly anxious that any details about Dauger's former employment should not leak out if the King decided to relax the conditions of Fouquet's or Lauzun's incarceration.

After Fouquet's death on 23 March 1680, Saint-Mars discovered a secret hole between Fouquet and Lauzun's cells. He was sure that they had communicated through this hole without detection by him or his guards and thus that Lauzun must have been made aware of Dauger's existence. On 8 April 1680, Louvois therefore wrote to Saint-Mars and instructed him to move Lauzun to Fouquet's cell and to tell him that Dauger and La Rivière had been released, after secretly relocating them to a new cell in the Lower Tower of Pignerol's dungeon. They became henceforth identified in official correspondence only as "the gentlemen of the lower tower" ("les messieurs de la tour d'en bas"). After Fouquet's death, the strength of Saint-Mars's company was decreased from 135 to 65 men, officers included.

Lauzun was freed a year later, on 22 April 1681. The King put him under the constant guard of Maupertuis (Note: [Translation:] "Louis de Melun, marquess of Maupertuis (ca. 1634-1721). He was appointed quartermaster of the first company of musketeers on 7 November 1661. Standard bearer in 1667, second lieutenant in 1673, he became its captain lieutenant in 1684 (Le Pippre de Neufville, II, p. 157-8).")—a lieutenant of musketeers and friend of Saint-Mars—and 12 musketeers, and ordered that he should be taken to Bourbon-l'Archambault for a cure, then assigned a residence in Chalon-sur-Saône, and finally begin his rehabilitation at Amboise. The King consented to see him once and, after the interview, he was allowed to go wherever he pleased, including Paris, but was banned from attending court in Versailles. The King also informed his cousin, the Duchess of Montpensier, that he would never consent to her marriage with Lauzun. Lauzun's release from Pignerol marked the end of Saint-Mars's custody of prestigious prisoners, and his company was reduced from 65 to 45 men, officers included.

=== Subsequent prisons (1681–1703) ===
==== Exilles (1681–1687) ====
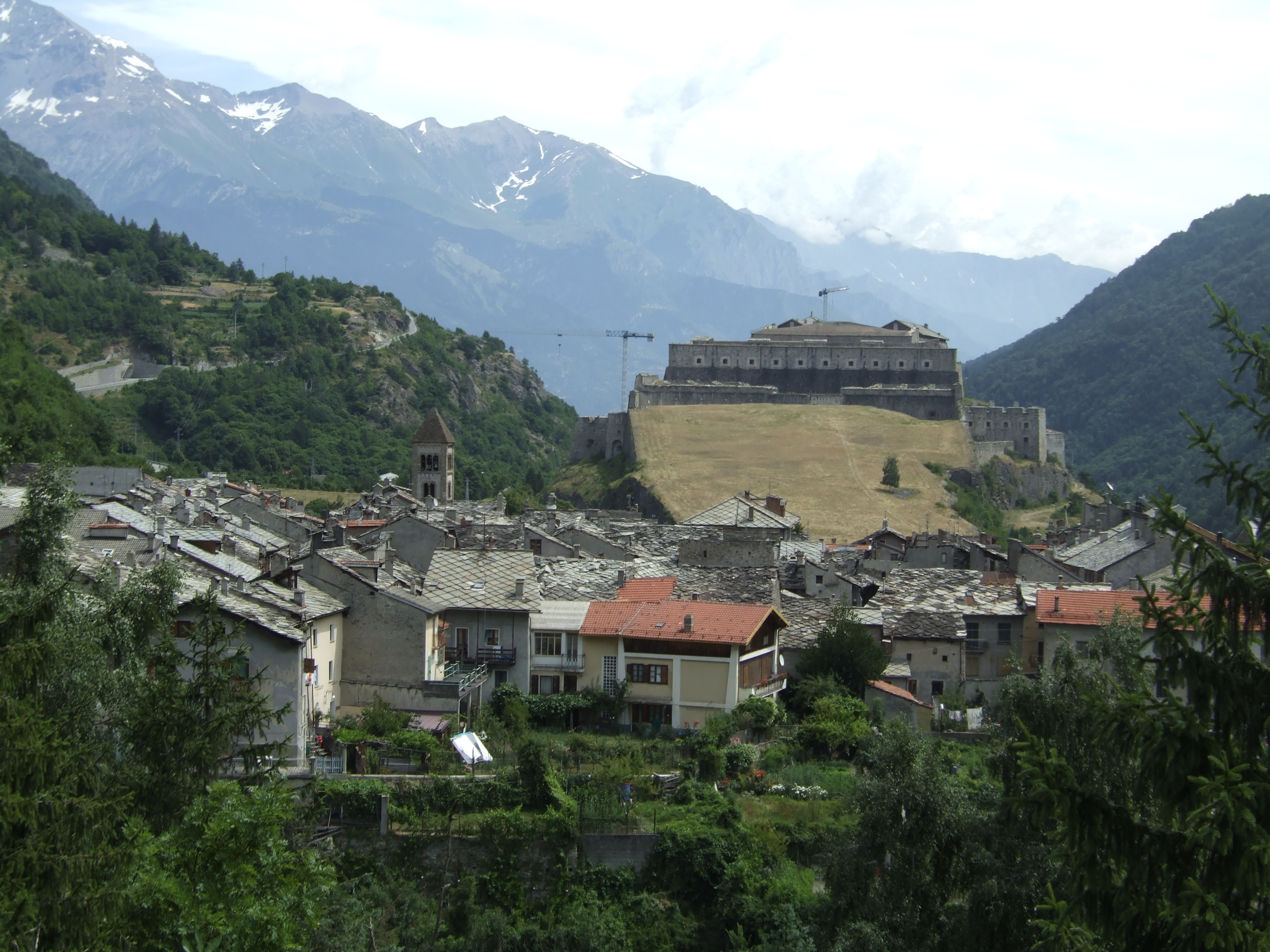
Fortress of Exilles

With the impending acquisition of the town of Casale by France, finally resolved despite Mattioli's treachery, the concentration of French troops around Pignerol required extensive works to be carried out at the citadel. Louvois therefore decided to transfer Dauger and La Rivière, "the two most important prisoners", to the fortress of Exilles, located about 40 km (25 mi) west of Pignerol, on the road to Briançon, and appointed Saint-Mars as its governor on 12 May 1681, with an income of 2,000 livres per annum. (Note: The sources disagree about this amount: Lair (1890) has 6,000 livres ("500 livres per month"); Petitfils (2004) has 10,000 livres; Pagnol (1973) has 2,000 livres, like Mongrédien (1961), who cites Topin (1870) and Ravaisson (1868) as his sources for the letter to d'Estrades on 25 June 1681, in which Saint-Mars mentioned his income.) (Note: Saint-Mars also augmented his income by taking a cut from his company's budget and from the daily allowance paid for the upkeep of all his prisoners.) The other three prisoners, Dubreuil, Lapierre, and Mattioli (plus his valet, Rousseau) all remained at Pignerol. Saint-Mars's company of 45 men, including two lieutenants, was deemed necessary to protect the fortress from being raided by a force intent on liberating the two valets, although a more likely reason was that Louvois wanted to save his protégé from loss of income and prestige, and from perceiving his move to Exilles as a fall from grace.

Since the prison in Exilles also needed modifications, including to secure the cell of the two prisoners with the same multiple doors as had been constructed at Pignerol, the transfer of prisoners was postponed until the works were completed. An additional delay, requiring Saint-Mars's diligent attention a little longer at Pignerol, was caused by the final negotiations of the transfer of Casale to France, during which Nicolas Catinat had been secretly lodged at Pignerol under the pseudonym of "Guibert", prior to his troops' successful occupation of Casale, to which he was appointed governor on 1 October.

Shortly thereafter, Saint-Mars and his free company finally undertook the short journey to Exilles, with Dauger and La Rivière transported in a horse-drawn litter curtained by leather or oilcloth, as instructed by Louvois in his letter on 9 June.

After the intense daily routine of Pignerol and its troublesome prisoners, Saint-Mars found Exilles to be a much quieter posting, isolated, sad and boring. He never missed an opportunity to absent himself, by going hunting, walking in nearby valleys, or visiting his friend Jean-Jacques Losa, governor of Susa for the Duke of Savoy, Victor Amadeus II. He regularly wrote requests to take more leave, which Louvois and the King often declined to grant him. His two prisoners were still being kept under extraordinarily strict precautions for mere valets, while Louvois seemed to care little for the three left at Pignerol. In a letter dated 2 March 1682, he wrote to Saint-Mars:

The King ordered me to instruct you to have them guarded so severely that you could assure His Majesty that they would speak to nobody whatsoever, not only from without but also from within the Exilles garrison itself. I request that you inform me from time to time about what happens concerning them.

On 11 March, Saint-Mars replied:

My prisoners are guarded day and night by two soldiers posted on both sides of the tower, looking obliquely at the prisoners' windows, with instructions to listen if anyone speaks to them, or if they shout from their windows, and to hurry away any passers-by who stopped along the path or on the slope of the mountain. Inside the tower, I have divided it in such a way that the priest delivering mass can't see them, thanks to a tambour door that was installed at my request to cover their multiple doors. The servants who bring their food place the necessary on a table outside their cell, and my lieutenant takes it and brings it to them. Nobody speaks to them, save myself, my officer [lieutenant La Prade], the priest [the abbé Antoine Rignon] and a doctor from Pragelato, six leagues away, and in my presence only. For their clothes, same precautions I applied for my prisoners in the past.

To which Louvois replied, on 31 March: "The King does not want that another lieutenant than the one accustomed to speak to them has any communications with them whatsoever." After the abbé Rignon died, Louvois wrote to Saint-Mars on 3 June 1682: "Your prisoners should only be confessed following an order from the King or when in peril of imminent death, and this you will observe, if you please." When Saint-Mars, now approaching the age of 60, requested some leave to go and take the waters at Aix-les-Bains, Louvois responded, on 7 March 1685:

The King desires that you go and take some fresh air wherever you deem suitable to your health, but His Majesty recommends that you give such good orders for your prisoners' security that nobody could have communications with them while you are absent, and that there will be no misadventure."

During their imprisonment at Exilles, the two prisoners were often ill and, in June 1685, La Rivière asked permission to make his will. In October 1686, he became seriously ill with dropsy and died in early January 1687. His death-bed confession was probably heard by the abbé Guy Favre, appointed in May 1686 to provide religious services to the whole company. After La Rivière's death, Dauger was referred to as "La Tour" by prison staff and as "the old prisoner" ("l'ancien prisonnier") in correspondence.

In Pignerol, Dubreuil had been freed on 13 June 1684, when the Truce of Ratisbonne stipulated the liberation of war prisoners. He was re-arrested in June 1696 for dealing in counterfeit money between Lyon and Geneva, and incarcerated at the Château de Pierre Encise prison, where he died in May 1711.

==== Île Sainte-Marguerite (1687–1698) ====
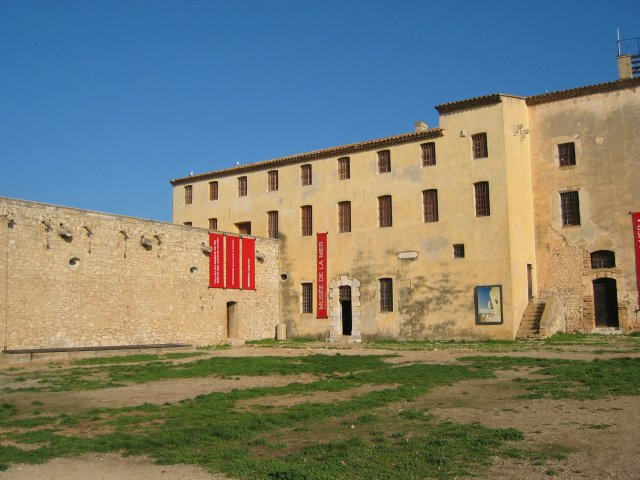
Fort Royal in Île Sainte-Marguerite, showing the main door to the extension of 1687 and, on the left, the rectangular wing of four new cells added in 1690

In January 1687, Louvois appointed Saint-Mars governor of Île Sainte-Marguerite and Île Saint-Honorat, the two largest of the Lérins Islands 800 m (0.50 mi) offshore from Cannes. Saint-Mars was to be based at Sainte-Marguerite's Fort Royal, along with his company of 45 men, even though the existing garrison already numbered more than 300 men. (Note: The existing garrison at Fort Royal comprised: a captain-major (Pierre de Bussy), a weapons commissioner, a harbour master, four gunners, one chaplain, one surgeon and two fraters as his assistants, an existing company of 180 men commanded by a captain, several officers and non-commissioned officers, plus two smaller companies of 70 men each.)

Fort Royal was a citadel on a war footing with bastions, ditches, ravelins, and fortified walls, but was not a real prison, with only a few rooms in the main castle sometimes used to house deserters or the wayward sons of notable families. After several visits to determine the work required to house his sole prisoner in the usual way, Saint-Mars decided to add another level to the castle for himself, including two new spacious cells on the ground floor, increased to six in 1690 by the addition of a rectangular wing connected to the castle.

Saint-Mars and his company finally left Exilles on 17 April and arrived in Sainte-Marguerite on 30 April, after a journey of 50 leagues (200 km; 124 mi). Dauger was transported in a sedan chair covered by an oilcloth, carried on the shoulders of four Italian porters who, in relay with four others, had taken him over mountain roads, then by road to Cannes. (Note: The journey to Sainte-Marguerite progressed across the Montgenèvre Pass, with overnight stops in the towns of Oulx, Briançon, Embrun, La Bréole, Seyne, Le Vernet, Digne, and then followed the Grand Chemin, stopping over in Chaudon, Barrême, Senez, Castellane, Séranon, and Grasse.)

On 3 May, Saint-Mars wrote to Louvois:

The journey took 12 days, because my prisoner was ill and complaining that he suffered from not having enough air. I can assure you, Sir, that nobody in the world saw him, and that the way I guarded him during the whole journey caused everyone to seek to guess who my prisoner might be. [...] My prisoner's bed was so old and broken, as was everything else he used, whether table linen or furniture, that it wasn't worth bringing here, and we sold them all for only 13 écus (39 livres).

On his arrival, Dauger was lodged in a small—and somewhat unsanitary—fortified shed that had been built behind the castle in 1685, until his new cell was completed in December 1687. (Note: Noone described Dauger's new cell as follows: "The door to the Iron Mask's prison cell is of massive wood studded and strapped with iron and has rings for a bolt. It pulls backwards into the passageway, giving access through the thickness of the wall, a depth of three feet, to another door of the same construction which pushes forward into the cell. When this inner door is open at right angles to the jamb, it lies flat against the wall of the cell, allowing an unimpeded view from the doorway of the entire room: twenty feet to the wall facing the door, fifteen feet to the wall on the left. The walls either side curve overhead in a smooth arc like the sides of a tunnel and in the wall at the end, four feet from the ground, is a large barred window, seven feet high by four feet wide. Beyond the window, the prison wall drops sheer, flush with the cliff, to rocks and waves more than a hundred feet below. The window affords no view of this: the wall it pierces is six feet thick and the opening is closed by three iron grilles set one behind the other, restricting the view to a narrow section of the distant mainland. On the left of the window is a fireplace and on the right a privy. The wall is roughly plastered and the floor is paved with brick.") Soon thereafter, a sentinel named Aubry—who had often guarded Dauger's cell—estimated him to be about 50 years old. (Note: When Dauger arrived at Sainte-Marguerite, Aubry was a 15-years-old cadet in Saint-Mars's company, and later became Commander of the Lérins Islands, a post he still held in 1743. [Original text:] "On disait alors que ce prisonnier inconnu était un homme d'environ cinquante ans. C'est du moins ce que nous a assuré M. Aubry, qui de simple cadet était devenu Commandant des Îles de Lérins, et qui l'était encore en 1743. Il n'avait que quinze ans lorsque le Masque de fer fut conduit à Sainte-Marguerite, et il avait souvent fait sentinelle à sa porte.")

After a letter from Louvois to Saint-Mars on 5 July 1688, there is a long gap of three years in correspondence, during which nothing is known about Saint-Mars and his prisoners. On 16 July 1691, Louvois died and was immediately succeeded as War Minister by his son, the Marquis of Barbezieux. In his first letter to Saint-Mars, dated 13 August, Barbezieux wrote:

Your letter of the 26th of last month has reached me. When you have something to tell me about the prisoner you have been guarding for twenty years, I ask you to use the same precautions as when you wrote to M. de Louvois.

This important letter, kept in the Anciennes Archives de la Guerre, (Note: Service historique de l'Armée de Terre (Anciennes Archives de la Guerre). Série A1, Volume 1034, p. 246.) confirms that the prisoner being mentioned can only have been Eustache Dauger since, by that date, he was the only prisoner who had been kept in Saint-Mars's uninterrupted custody for 22 years, which Barbezieux approximated to "twenty years". Dauger dragged out 11 years in solitary confinement at Sainte-Marguerite, with no apparent changes, having contact with no one except Saint-Mars and his lieutenants, a doctor when he was ill, and a confessor at set times.

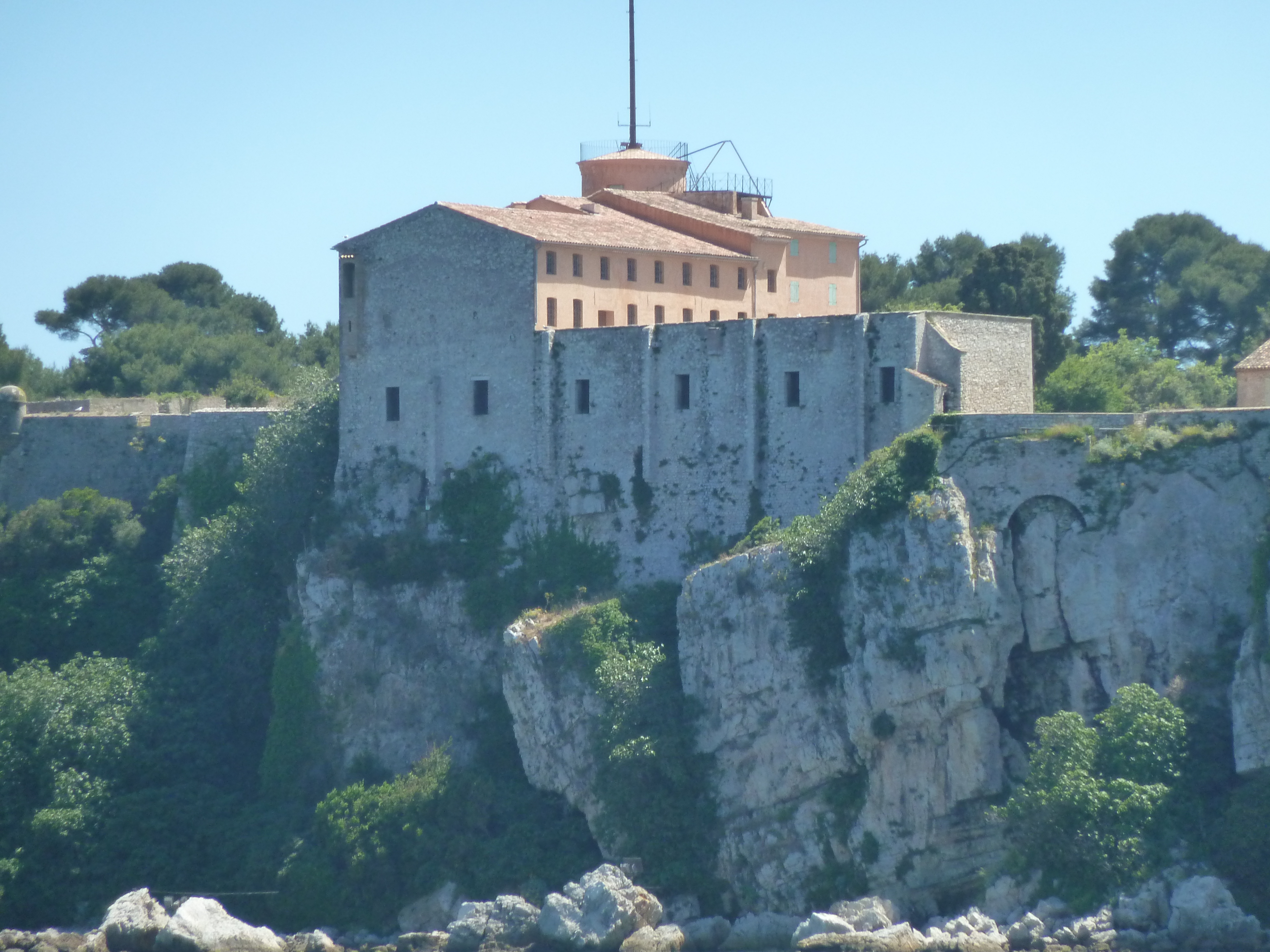
Fort Royal in Île Sainte-Marguerite viewed from the sea, showing windows of the six cells

From May 1689, Saint-Mars also became answerable to the Count of Pontchartrain, Louis XIV's Controller-General of Finances, for six protestant ministers arrested and incarcerated at Fort Royal after the Edict of Fontainebleau (17 October 1685) revoked Henry IV's Edict of Nantes (1598). These prisoners (Note: These six prisoners were: Paul Cardel (incarcerated on 10 May 1689), initially held in one of Fort Royal's secure rooms; Pierre de Salves, aka Valsec (7 April 1690), initially held in the fortified shed built in 1685; Gabriel Mathurin (May 1690); Mathieu Malzac (June 1692); Jean Gardien-Givry and Elisée Giraut (both July 1694).) were eventually held, sometimes several to a cell, in the rectangular wing that was appended to the castle in 1690.

In Pignerol, the Dominican monk, Lapierre, died in January 1694. In April of that year Mattioli and his valet Rousseau were moved to Sainte-Marguerite, back into the custody of Saint-Mars; Mattioli died there on 28 April 1694, as did Rousseau five years later, in early December 1699.

==== Bastille (1698–1703) ====
On 1 May 1698, Barbezieux wrote to inform Saint-Mars that Louis XIV had appointed him governor of the Bastille, the highest posting for prison officers, worth 15,168 livres per annum, plus 6,000 livres in taxes levied on local shops and on boats navigating the nearby Seine. Modern historians (Noone; Petitfils) pointed out that Barbezieux's letter gave no instructions concerning whether Dauger should remain at Sainte-Marguerite or be transferred to the Bastille. In a letter of 8 May, now lost, Saint-Mars must have asked for such instructions, since Barbezieux replied on 15 June:

I have been a long time replying to the letter which you took the trouble to write to me on the 8th of last month, because the King did not inform me of his intentions sooner. You can make your dispositions to be ready to leave when I instruct you to do so, and you may bring with you your long-time prisoner under safe guard.

Noone (1988) wrote: "The fact that the King took over a month to grant his permission gives reason to believe that he did not consider the prisoner to be as important as Saint-Mars made him out to be, and this is confirmed by a letter from Barbezieux to Saint-Mars on 4 August:"

I have received the letter which you took the trouble to write to me on the 24th of last month, in which you mentioned the precautions that you must take for the transfer of your prisoner. I have conveyed these to the King, who has approved them, and sees fit that you take him with you, like I have instructed you in one of my earlier letters, that I am in no doubt you received presently. His majesty has not judged it necessary to send the order you suggested to commandeer lodging on your journey to Paris: it will suffice for you to find and pay for the most convenient and secure lodging possible in the places you decide to stay.

Petitfils (2004) wrote: "Instead of receiving a safe-conduct enabling him to lodge without difficulty in the King's castles, military forts and citadels, Saint-Mars was instructed to organise the journey to Paris by regular roads, stopping at ordinary post-houses and hostels along the way to lodge his prisoner as best he could, and to pay his bills as he went along."

In addition to Dauger, Saint-Mars brought with him only five members of his existing staff from Sainte-Marguerite: his nephew Guillaume de Formanoir de Corbé (lieutenant), Jacques Rosarges (major), the Abbé Honoré Giraut (chaplain), Lécuyer (sergeant/chief turnkey), and Antoine Larue, known as Rû (turnkey). (Note: Since the Bastille was administered by the Maison du Roi ("Household of the King"), Saint-Mars now came fully under the authority of Pontchartain (who was also Secretary of State of the Maison du Roi at the time) and therefore lost command of the rest of his free company, which remained at Sainte-Marguerite and under the authority of Barbezieux's War Ministry.) The journey to Paris included an episode related by Guillaume-Louis Formanoir de Palteau (the son of Guillaume de Formanoir de Corbé) in a letter on 19 June 1768 to Fréron, who published it at once in his Année littéraire:

On his way to take up his new post, Mr. de Saint-Mars stopped off with his prisoner at his estate of Palteau. The man with the mask arrived in a litter which preceded that of Mr. de Saint-Mars and they were accompanied by several men on horseback. The peasants went to meet their master. Mr. de Saint-Mars ate with his prisoner, whose back was turned towards the windows which gave onto the courtyard. The peasants I have questioned could not see if he had his mask on, but they saw very well that Mr. de Saint-Mars, who was facing him at the table, had two pistols beside his plate. They had only one manservant to wait on them, and the dishes were brought to an ante-chamber where he went to get them, being careful to close the door of the dining-room behind him. Whenever the prisoner crossed the courtyard he had the black mask on his face; the peasants noticed that his teeth and lips were visible, and that he was tall with white hair. Mr. de Saint-Mars slept in a bed put up for him beside the bed of the man with the mask.

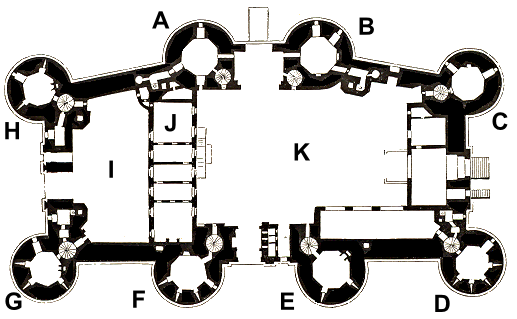
Plan of the Bastille in the 18th century. A – La Chapelle Tower; B – Trésor Tower; C – Comté Tower; D – Bazinière Tower; E – Bertaudière Tower; F – Liberté Tower; G – Puits Tower; H – Coin Tower; I – Courtyard of the Well; J – Office wing; K – Large Courtyard

Saint-Mars took up his new post on 18 September. His new second-in-command, Etienne Du Junca, a lieutenant de roi (Note: A lieutenant de roi was an administrative functionary appointed as second in command in fortresses and other places of war. This post should not be confused with the more general term lieutenant du roi which designates an officer sent with military powers to represent the king, generally as a deputy to the governor in certain towns or provinces.) who kept a register of all prisoners held at the fortress, noted that the new governor "brought with him in his palanquin an old prisoner he had at Pignerol, whom he keeps always masked and whose name is not spoken".

On his arrival, Dauger was placed temporarily in the first chamber on the first floor of the Bazinière Tower, located immediately to the left of the drawbridge, which usually served as a provisional accommodation for a few hours or a few days. At nine o'clock that evening, Du Junca and major Rosarges relocated him to a solitary cell in the pre-furnished third chamber on the third floor of the Bertaudière tower. (Note: Petitfils described Dauger's Bertaudière cell as follows: "Closed by two doors reinforced with metallic bars and locked by four keys, this octagonal room was four meters high and measured four meters by six-and-a-half meters, with a floor paved with brick and a white-washed ceiling. Unlike most other cells, it had a full window, pierced in a ten-foot wall and covered with an iron grille, accessible over three small steps. The room included a fireplace (with a hood) and a privy; like in the other rooms, the walls were very dirty and covered with graffiti.") Rosarges, who had been part of Saint-Mars's staff since Pignerol, was to continue taking care of the prisoner, and to feed him.

Du Junca's register confirms that the masked prisoner was kept in the third chamber of the Bertaudière Tower until 21 November 1699 and, despite extensive research into the Bastille archives, it is not known where he was relocated after that date. Modern historians believe that, given the poor soundproofing of the Bastille's cells, Saint-Mars must have decided to keep Dauger close to him in his residence adjacent to the fortress, in a small room that had already served as a prison in 1693, during the tenure of his predecessor, François de Montlezun, Lord of Besmaux. According to evidence recorded by contemporaneous eye-witnesses, the masked prisoner used to go back and forth through the courtyard on his way to and from mass in the chapel located on the ground floor of the Liberty Tower, but other than that, nothing is known about his life in the Bastille.

A month or two before his death, he told the Bastille's doctor Fresquière: (Note: Dr. Fresquière was appointed the Bastille's doctor on 19 September 1703 after the resignation of his predecessor, Dr. Jean-Baptiste Alliot, who had held the post since 11 February 1684.) "I believe I am sixty years old" ("Je crois avoir soixante ans"). (Note: Petitfils wrote that Voltaire obtained this detail from Dr. Fresquière's son-in-law, Dr. Jean Marsolan (died 1764), who had been the 3rd Duke of Richelieu's surgeon.) When he died, Du Junca logged the following entry in his register:

On this day, Monday 19 November 1703, the unknown prisoner in the mask of black velvet who was brought here by the governor, M. de Saint-Mars, when he came from the island of Sainte-Marguerite, and who had been in his charge for a long time, felt a little unwell after attending mass and died today at 10 o'clock in the evening, without suffering a major disease. Surprised by death he did not receive the sacraments, but M. Giraut, the chaplain, had heard his confession the day before and exhorted him a little before he died."

He was buried the next day under the name of "Marchioly" in the cemetery of the parish church of Saint-Paul in the presence of Rosarges and Abraham Reilhe, surgeon-major of the Bastille, who signed the death register, and the sum of 40 livres was paid for his burial.

== Candidates ==
=== Contemporaneous rumours ===
A week after Dauger's arrival at Pignerol, Saint-Mars wrote to Louvois (31 August 1669) reporting that the prisoner was rumoured to be a "Marshall of France or President of Parlement". Eight months later, Saint-Mars informed Louvois (12 April 1670) that he initiated some of these rumours himself, when asked about the prisoner: "I tell them tall tales to make fun of them."

When Dauger was relocated to his third prison cell at the Île Sainte-Marguerite Fort in January 1687, Saint-Mars wrote to Louvois about the latest rumours (3 May 1687): "Everyone tries to guess who my prisoner might be." On 4 September 1687, the Nouvelles Écclésiastiques published a letter by Nicolas Fouquet's brother Louis, quoting a statement made by Saint-Mars: "All the people that one believes dead are not", a hint that the prisoner might be the Duke of Beaufort. Four months later, Saint-Mars reiterated this rumour in writing to Louvois (8 January 1688), adding: "others say that he is a son of the late Cromwell".

==== Royal denial ====
Giacomo Casanova, in his autobiographical work Histoire de ma vie, states that his French teacher and rival of Voltaire as a playwright, Prosper Jolyot de Crébillon, who had known Louis XIV and who was Royal Censor under Louis XV, received from the Sun King the confidence that no Man in the Iron Mask had ever existed and that it was a legend. "According to Crébillon, the man in the iron mask was a fable; he said that Louis XIV had assured him of this with his own mouth."

=== English milord ===
On 10 October 1711, King Louis XIV's sister-in-law, Elizabeth Charlotte, Princess Palatine, sent a letter to her aunt, Sophia, Electress of Hanover, stating that the prisoner had "two musketeers at his side to kill him if he removed his mask". She described him as very devout, and stated that he was well treated and received everything he desired. In another letter sent less than two weeks later, on 22 October, she added having just learnt that he was "an English milord connected with the affair of the Duke of Berwick against King William III." The Princess was clearly reporting rumours she had heard at court.

=== King's relative ===
Some of the most enduring theories about the prisoner's identity, outlined in the sections below, assume that he was a relative of Louis XIV, because of the importance attached to secrecy during his incarceration which, in turn, fed the legend that he must have been one of the most important persons in the realm. These theories emerged during the 1700s, long before historians were able to consult the archives revealing that the prisoner was "only a valet", imprisoned for "what he was employed to do", and for "what he saw"/"what he knew". These early theories arose solely from their author's imagination, and boosted the romantic appeal of a sensational elucidation of the enigma. Historians such as Mongrédien (1952) and Noone (1988), however, pointed out that the solution whereby Louis XIV is supposed to have had an illegitimate brother—whether older, twin, or younger—does not provide a credible explanation, for example, on how it would have been possible for Queen Anne of Austria to conceal a pregnancy throughout its full course and bear, then deliver, a child in secret. Mongrédien concluded that "historians cannot give it the slightest credence."

==== King's illegitimate son ====
In 1745, an anonymous writer published a book in Amsterdam, Mémoires pour servir à l'Histoire de la Perse, romanticising life at the French Court in the form of Persian history. Members of the royal family and locations were given fictitious Persian names, and their key was published in the book's third edition (1759). In this tale, Louis XIV's illegitimate son, Louis, Count of Vermandois, is alleged to have struck his half-brother, Louis, Grand Dauphin, causing the King to banish him to life imprisonment, first at the Île Sainte-Marguerite and later at the Bastille. He was made to wear a mask whenever he was to be seen or attended to, when sick or in other circumstances. The theory of Vermandois as the prisoner in the mask was later mentioned by Henri Griffet, in 1769, as having circulated during the reign of Louis XIV, therefore long before 1745.

In reality, there are no historical records of gossip confirming that Vermandois ever struck the Grand Dauphin. In the memoirs of Louis XIV's first cousin, the Duchess of Montpensier, there is mention of Vermandois having displeased the King for taking part in orgies in 1682, and being temporarily banished from court as a result. After promising to mend his way, he was sent—soon after his 16th birthday—to join the army in Courtrai during the War of the Reunions (1683–84), in early November 1683. He distinguished himself in the battle line, but died of a fever during the night of 17 November. Louis XIV was reported to be deeply affected by his son's death, and Vermandois' sister, Marie Anne de Bourbon, was inconsolable while their mother, Louise de La Vallière, sought solace in endless prayer at her Carmelites convent in Paris.

==== King's elder brother ====
During his two sojourns in the Bastille in 1717–18 and 1726, (Note: Voltaire was imprisoned twice in the Bastille: first, from 16 May 1717 till 14 April 1718, for writing satirical verse accusing the Régent of incest with his daughter; and second, from 17–26 April 1726, prior to his exile to England on 2 May for two-and-a-half years, for an argument with Guy Auguste de Rohan-Chabot whom Voltaire had challenged to a duel.) Voltaire became aware of the traditions and legends circulating among the staff at the fortress. On 30 October 1738, he wrote to the Abbé Dubos: "I am somewhat knowledgeable about the adventure of the Man in the Iron Mask, who died at the Bastille; I spoke to people who had served him." In the second edition of his Questions sur l'Encyclopédie (1771), Voltaire claimed that the prisoner was an illegitimate first son of Anne of Austria and an unknown father, and therefore an older half-brother of Louis XIV. This assertion was partly based on the historical fact that the birth of Louis XIV on 5 September 1638 had come as a surprise: since Louis XIII and Anne of Austria had been childless for 23 years, it was believed they were unable to conceive, despite evidence to the contrary of the queen's well-known miscarriages. (Note: Anne of Austria delivered a stillborn child in December 1619, and suffered four further miscarriages: in the Spring of 1621, in March 1622, in November 1626, and in April 1631.) In fact, the royal couple had been living for years in mutual distrust and had become estranged since the mid-1620s. Furthermore, in August 1637, the Queen had been found guilty of treasonable correspondence with Spain and had been placed under house arrest at the Louvre Palace. However, contemporaneous accounts nonetheless indicate that the royal couple shared a bed and conceived the future Louis XIV, either in early December 1637 (Note: According to a contemporaneous account, on the night of 5 December 1637, Louis XIII was caught in a storm in the centre of Paris and was unable to reach his own bed, which had been arranged for him at the Condé estate in Saint-Maur, south-east of Vincennes. Cut off from his household staff, he was persuaded by the Captain of the Queen's Guard to spend the night at the Louvre; as a result, the King and Queen ate together and, since there was no royal bed available except the Queen's, slept together as well, resulting in Louis XIV's birth exactly nine months later.) or, as historians deem more likely, sometime during the previous month. (Note: The reliable La Gazette recorded that the royal couple lodged in St Germain from 9 November till 1 December 1637, before heading to Paris. On 2 December, the King travelled from Paris to Crosne–instead of Saint-Maur–whence he went to Versailles on 5 December while the Queen remained in Paris. Kleinman contends that the King might well have stopped over in Paris on his way to Versailles, but even if he had spent the night of 5 December with the Queen, it doesn't imply this was the first time they shared a bed since August. The Queen's doctor, Charles Bouvard, calculated that her pregnancy had begun at the end of November.) The Queen's pregnancy was made public on 30 January 1638.

Based on the assumption that the royal couple were unable to conceive, Voltaire theorised that an earlier, secret birth of an illegitimate child persuaded the Queen that she was not infertile, in turn prompting Cardinal Richelieu to arrange an outing during which the royal couple had to share a bed, which led to the birth of Louis XIV.

The theme of an imagined elder brother of Louis XIV resurfaced in 1790, when French historian Pierre-Hubert Charpentier asserted that the prisoner was an illegitimate son of Anne of Austria and George Villiers, 1st Duke of Buckingham, supposedly born in 1626, two years before the latter's death. Louis XIV was presumed to have had this elder brother imprisoned upon the Queen's death in 1666. According to Charpentier, this theory had originated with a certain Mademoiselle de Saint-Quentin, a mistress of the Marquess of Barbezieux, son of Louvois and his successor as War Minister to Louis XIV in 1691. A few days before his sudden death on 5 January 1701, Barbezieux had told her the secret of the prisoner's identity, which she disclosed publicly to several people in Chartres towards the end of her life in the mid-1700s. Charpentier also stated that Voltaire had heard this version in Geneva, but chose to omit Buckingham's name when he began to develop his own variant of this theory in the first edition of The Age of Louis XIV (1751), finally revealed in full in Questions sur l'Encyclopédie (1771).

==== King's twin brother ====
Many authors supported the theory of the prisoner being a twin brother of Louis XIV: Michel de Cubières (1789), Jean-Louis Soulavie (1791), Las Cases (1816), Victor Hugo (1839), Alexandre Dumas (1840), Paul Lecointe (1847), and others.

In a 1965 essay, Le Masque de fer (revised in 1973 under the title Le secret du Masque de Fer), French novelist and playwright Marcel Pagnol, proposing his hypothesis in particular on the circumstances of Louis XIV's birth, claimed that the Man in the Iron Mask was indeed a twin brother, but born second, who would have been hidden in order to avoid any dispute over the throne holder. At the time, there was a controversy over which one of twins was the elder: the one born first, or the one born second, who was then thought to have been conceived first.

Historians who reject this hypothesis (including Jean-Christian Petitfils) highlight the conditions of childbirth for the Queen: it usually took place in the presence of multiple witnesses—the main court's figures. According to Pagnol, immediately after the birth of the future Louis XIV at 11 a.m. on 5 September 1638, Louis XIII took his whole court (about 40 people) to the Château de Saint-Germain's chapel to celebrate a Te Deum in great pomp, contrary to the common practice of celebrating it several days before childbirth. Pagnol contends that the court's removal to this Te Deum had been rushed to enable the Queen to deliver the second twin in secret and attended only by the midwife.

Pagnol's solution—combining earlier theories by Soulavie (1790), Andrew Lang (1903), Arthur Barnes (1908), and Edith Carey (1924)—speculates that this twin was born a few hours after Louis XIV and grew up on the Island of Jersey under the name James de la Cloche, believing himself to be an illegitimate son of Charles II. During a hypothetical, secret meeting in January 1669, Charles is assumed to have recognised the twin for his resemblance to the French king and revealed to him his true identity. Shortly thereafter, the twin would supposedly have adopted the new identity of "Martin" as a valet to Roux de Marcilly, with whom he conspired against Louis XIV, which led to his arrest in Calais in July 1669. Historically, however, the real valet Martin (distinct from Pagnol's reinterpreted "Martin") could not have become "Eustache Dauger" because he had fled to London when the Roux conspiracy failed; this is well known because his extradition from England to France had at first been requested by Foreign Minister Hugues de Lionne on 12 June 1669, but subsequently cancelled by him on 13 July. Pagnol explained this historical fact away by claiming, without any evidence, that "Martin" must have been secretly abducted in London in early July and transported to France on 7 or 8 July, and that the extradition order had therefore been cancelled because it was no longer necessary, its objective having already been achieved.

==== King's younger brother ====
In 1791, Jean Baptiste De Saint-Mihiel proposed that the prisoner was an illegitimate younger brother of Louis XIV, fathered by Cardinal Mazarin. This theory was based on the fact, mentioned by Voltaire in Questions sur l'Encyclopédie (1771), that the prisoner had told his doctor that he "believed himself to be about 60 years old", a few days before his death in 1703. De Saint-Mihiel extrapolated that the prisoner was therefore born around 1643, and could therefore only be a younger brother to the King, born in 1638. It is a historical fact that, four days after Louis XIII's death on 14 May 1643, Anne of Austria was declared Regent and appointed Mazarin as her chief minister and head of government that evening. Mazarin was soon believed to be her lover, and even her secret morganatic husband. The theory of the prisoner being an imagined, younger son of the Queen and Mazarin was rekindled in 1868 by Charles-Henri, baron de Gleichen.

==== King's father ====
In 1955, Hugh Ross Williamson argued that the Man in the Iron Mask was the natural father of Louis XIV. According to this theory, the "miraculous" birth of Louis XIV in 1638 would have come after Louis XIII had been estranged from his wife Anne of Austria for 14 years.

The theory then suggests that Cardinal Richelieu had arranged for a substitute, probably an illegitimate grandson of Henry IV, to become intimate with the Queen and father an heir in the King's stead. At the time, the heir presumptive was Louis XIII's brother Gaston, Duke of Orléans, who was Richelieu's enemy. If Gaston became king, Richelieu would quite likely have lost both his job as minister and his life, and so it was in his best interests to thwart Gaston's ambitions.

Supposedly, the substitute father then left for the Americas but returned to France in the 1660s with the aim of extorting money for keeping his secret and was promptly imprisoned. This theory would explain the secrecy surrounding the prisoner, whose true identity would have destroyed the legitimacy of Louis XIV's claim to the throne had it been revealed.

This theory had been suggested by British politician Hugh Cecil, 1st Baron Quickswood, who nonetheless added that the idea has no historical basis and is entirely hypothetical. Williamson held that: "to say it is a guess with no solid historical basis is merely to say that it is like every other theory on the matter, although it makes more sense than any of the other theories. There is no known evidence that is incompatible with it, even the age of the prisoner, which Cecil had considered a weak point; and it explains every aspect of the mystery." His time spent as a valet to another prisoner renders this idea doubtful, however.

==== Philippe d'Orléans's younger brother ====
In 2024, Canadian author Sarah B. Madry claimed that, in January 1666, Louis XIV received his mother's confession on her deathbed that he was a child of François d'Auger de Cavoye, the captain of Cardinal Richelieu's personal guards, and his wife Marie de Cavoye. This theory aligns with historical speculation that a surrogate was arranged by Anne of Austria to answer the French state's peril of the lack of an heir for her dying husband King Louis XIII and to seek revenge at what she perceived as abuse for many years by her husband and Cardinal Richelieu. According to Madry's theory, the man in the iron mask was a younger brother of Philippe I, Duke of Orléans, and that this "second son" of Louis XIII and Anne of Austria was born in October or November 1643. The child was never presented or acknowledged because of a facial genetic defect, and was therefore assigned to caretakers under the name of "Eustache Dauger". In 1669, Louis XIV ordered his imprisonment, lest the disfigured man might one day claim the throne.

=== Italian diplomat ===
Another candidate, much favoured in the 1800s, was Count Ercole Antonio Mattioli (a.k.a. Matthioli). He was an Italian diplomat who acted on behalf of the debt-ridden Charles IV, Duke of Mantua, in 1678, in selling Casale, a strategic fortified town near the border with France. A French occupation would be unpopular, so discretion was essential, but Mattioli leaked the details to France's Spanish enemies after pocketing his commission once the sale had been concluded, and they made a bid of their own before the French forces could occupy the town. At the end of April 1679, Mattioli was lured onto French soil near Turin, where he was kidnapped by a French team of two officers and four soldiers under the command of Nicolas Catinat, and incarcerated into nearby Pignerol on 2 May. The French took possession of Casale two years later.

George Agar-Ellis reached the conclusion that Mattioli was the Man in the Iron Mask when he reviewed documents extracted from French archives in the 1820s. His book, published in English in 1826, was translated into French and published in 1830. German historian Wilhelm Broecking came to the same conclusion independently seventy years later. Robert Chambers's Book of Days supports the claim and places Mattioli in the Bastille for the last 13 years of his life. Since that time, letters sent by Saint-Mars, which earlier historians missed, indicate that Mattioli was held only at Pignerol and Sainte-Marguerite and was not at Exilles or the Bastille and, therefore, it is argued that he must be discounted.

=== French general ===
In 1890, Louis Gendron, a French military historian, came across some coded letters and passed them on to Étienne Bazeries in the French Army's cryptographic department. After three years, Bazeries managed to read some messages in the Great Cipher of Louis XIV. One of them referred to a prisoner and identified him as General Vivien de Bulonde. One of the letters written by Louvois made specific reference to de Bulonde's crime.

At the Siege of Cuneo in 1691, Bulonde was concerned about enemy troops arriving from Austria and ordered a hasty withdrawal, leaving behind his munitions and wounded men. Louis XIV was furious and in another of the letters specifically ordered him "to be conducted to the fortress at Pignerol where he will be locked in a cell and under guard at night, and permitted to walk the battlements during the day with a 330 309." It has been suggested that the 330 stood for masque and the 309 for full stop. However, in 17th-century French avec un masque would mean "in a mask".

Some believe that the evidence of the letters means that there is now little need for an alternative explanation of the man in the mask. Other sources, however, claim that Bulonde's arrest was no secret and was actually published in a newspaper at the time. Bulonde was released by order of the King on 11 December 1691. His death is also recorded as happening in 1709, six years after that of the man in the mask.

=== Son of Charles II ===
In 1908, Monsignor Arthur Barnes proposed that the prisoner was James de la Cloche, the alleged illegitimate son of the reluctant Protestant Charles II of England, who would have been his father's secret intermediary with the Catholic court of France. One of Charles's confirmed illegitimate sons, the Duke of Monmouth, has also been proposed as the man in the mask. A Protestant, he led a rebellion against his uncle, the Catholic King James II. The rebellion failed and Monmouth was executed in 1685. However, in 1768, a writer named Saint-Foix claimed that another man was executed in his place and that Monmouth became the masked prisoner, it being in Louis XIV's interests to assist a fellow Catholic like James, who would not necessarily want to kill his own nephew. Saint-Foix's case was based on unsubstantiated rumours and allegations that Monmouth's execution was faked.

=== Eustache Dauger de Cavoye ===
In his letter to Saint-Mars announcing the imminent arrival of the prisoner who would become the Man in the Iron Mask, Louvois gave his name as "Eustache Dauger". Historically, this was deemed to be a prison pseudonym, and a succession of historians therefore attempted to find out the prisoner's real identity. Among them, Maurice Duvivier (1932) wondered if, instead, "Eustache Dauger" might not be the real name of a person whose life and history could be traced; he therefore combed the archives for surnames such as Dauger, Daugers, d'Auger, d'Oger, d'Ogiers and similar forms. He discovered the family of François d'Oger de Cavoye, a captain of Cardinal Richelieu's guard of musketeers, who was married to Marie de Sérignan, a lady-in-waiting at the court of Louis XIV's mother, Queen Anne of Austria. François and Marie had 11 children, of whom six boys and three girls survived into adulthood.

Their third son was named Eustache, who signed his name as "Eustache Dauger de Cavoye". He was born on 30 August 1637 and baptised on 18 February 1639. (Note: After Duvivier's publication, two further theories emerged about Eustache Dauger de Cavoye's parentage, both proposing he was a half-brother of Louis XIV. In 1954, Rupert Furneaux had him as a son of Louis XIII and Marie de Sérignan. Twenty years later, Marie-Madeleine Mast suggested he was a son of Anne of Austria and François d'Oger de Cavoye, an idea echoed by Harry Thompson.) When his father and two eldest brothers were killed in battle, Eustache became the nominal head of the family. In his 1932 book, Duvivier published evidence that this man had been involved in scandalous and embarrassing events, first in 1659, then again in 1665, and speculated that he had also been linked with l'Affaire des Poisons.

==== Disgrace ====
In April 1659, Eustache Dauger de Cavoye and others (Note: The other participants at the party in Roissy-en-Brie were: Armand de Gramont, Count of Guiche; Philippe Jules Mancini, Duke of Nevers (Cardinal Mazarin's nephew and heir); Roger de Bussy-Rabutin; Bertrand de Manicamp; and a young priest (and future cardinal) called Étienne Le Camus.) were invited by the duke of Vivonne to an Easter weekend party at the castle of Roissy-en-Brie. By all accounts, it was a debauched affair of merry-making, with the men involved in all sorts of sordid activities, including attacking an elderly man who claimed to be Cardinal Mazarin's attorney. It was also rumoured, among other things, that a black mass was enacted and that a pig was baptised as "Carp" in order to allow them to eat pork on Good Friday.

When news of these events became public, an inquiry was held and the various perpetrators jailed or exiled. There is no record as to what happened to Dauger de Cavoye but, in 1665, near the Château de Saint-Germain-en-Laye, he allegedly killed a young page boy in a drunken brawl involving the Duc de Foix. The two men claimed that they had been provoked by the boy, who was drunk, but the fact that the killing took place close to where Louis XIV was staying at the time meant that this crime was deemed a personal affront to the King and, as a result, Dauger de Cavoye was forced to resign his commission. His mother died shortly afterwards. In her will, written a year earlier, she passed over her eldest surviving sons Eustache and Armand, leaving the bulk of the estate to their younger brother Louis. Eustache was restricted in the amount of money to which he had access, having built up considerable debts, and left with barely enough for "food and upkeep".

==== Affair of the Poisons ====
In his 1932 book, Duvivier also linked Eustache Dauger de Cavoye to the Affair of the Poisons, a notorious scandal of 1677–1682 in which people in high places were accused of being involved in black mass and poisonings. An investigation had been launched, but Louis XIV instigated a cover-up when it appeared that his mistress Madame de Montespan was involved. The records show that, during the inquiry, the investigators were told about a surgeon named Auger, who had supplied poisons for a black mass that took place before March 1668. Duvivier became convinced that Dauger de Cavoye, disinherited and short of money, had become Auger, the supplier of poisons, and subsequently "Eustache Dauger".

In a letter sent by Louvois to Saint-Mars on 10 July 1680, a few months after Fouquet's death in prison while "Eustache Dauger" was acting as his valet, the minister adds a note in his own handwriting, asking how it was possible that Dauger had made certain objects found in Fouquet's pockets—which Saint-Mars had mentioned in a previous correspondence, now lost—and "how he got the drugs necessary to do so". Duvivier suggested that Dauger had poisoned Fouquet as part of a complex power struggle between Louvois and his rival Colbert.

==== Dauger de Cavoye in prison at Saint-Lazare ====
In 1953, however, French historian Georges Mongrédien published historical documents (Note: Mongrédien published two letters in an article for the 15 April 1953 issue of the French historical journal XVII^{e} siècle. In that article, he wrote that he owed his ability to publish them "to the extreme consideration of M^{me} la baronne de Sarret de Coussergues, and her two daughters, M^{lle} de Sarret and M^{me} la comtesse Emmanuel de Bertier de Sauvigny, who were kind enough to extract two previously unpublished documents from their family archives, to send me photocopies, and to authorise me to publish [them]." In the first of these two letters, addressed to his sister, the Marquise de Fabrègues, and dated 20 June 1678, Dauger de Cavoye mentions that he has been held in captivity "for more than ten years". In the second letter, addressed to the King but undated, he mentions that he has been "detained in the prisons of St Lazare by a lettre de cachet [issued] by Your Majesty for the last eleven-and-a-half years".) confirming that, in 1668, Eustache Dauger de Cavoye was already held at the Prison Saint-Lazare in Paris—an asylum, run by monks, which many families used in order to imprison their "black sheep"—and that he was still there in 1680, at the same time that "Eustache Dauger" was in custody in Pignerol, hundreds of miles away in the south. These documents include a letter dated 20 June 1678, full of self-pity, sent by Dauger de Cavoye to his sister, the Marquise de Fabrègues, (Note: In a footnote, Mongrédien explained that the Marquise de Fabrègues was Eustache's eldest sister, Louise-Henriette, who had married François-Antoine de Sarret, Marquis de Fabrègues et de Coussergues, Maréchal de camp. Widowed in December 1674, she survived until 1696.) in which he complains about his treatment in prison, where he had already been held "for more than 10 years", and how he was deceived by their brother Louis and by Clérac, their brother-in-law and the manager of Louis's estate.

Dauger de Cavoye also wrote a second letter, this time to Louis XIV but undated, outlining the same complaints and requesting his freedom. The King responded in a letter to the head of Saint-Lazare on 17 August 1678, (Note: Noone mentions that this letter from Louis XIV "was brought to the author's attention by Stanislas Brugnon (...) [and] can be consulted in the register of the King's Orders in the National Archives in Paris", reference: "AN O1 22, folio 156".) telling him that "M. de Cavoye should have communication with no one at all, not even with his sister, unless in your presence or in the presence of one of the priests of the mission". The letter was signed by the King and Colbert. A poem written by Louis-Henri de Loménie de Brienne, an inmate in Saint-Lazare at the time, indicates that Eustache Dauger de Cavoye died as a result of heavy drinking in the late 1680s. Historians consider all this proof enough that he was not involved in any way with the man in the mask.

=== Valet ===
In 1890, French historian Jules Lair published an extensive, two-volume biography of Nicolas Fouquet in which he relates Eustache Dauger's arrival at Pignerol in August 1669, his subsequent role as Fouquet's valet, and their secret interactions with Lauzun. Lair believed that "Eustache Dauger" was the new prisoner's real name, that he was French, Catholic, and a professional valet who had been employed for a specific task which was never clarified: "he was probably one of these men tasked with a shady mission—such as the removal of documents or kidnapping, or perhaps worse—and whose silence is secured by death or imprisonment once the deed is done." Lair also conjectured an explanation for Louvois's obsessive insistence that Dauger and Lauzun should be kept apart at all times, by reference to the fact that Dauger was arrested near Dunkirk during the negotiations of the Secret Treaty of Dover, in which Lauzun had also participated. Lair asserted that the two men knew each other or, at the very least, had been aware of each other.

In 2016, American historian Paul Sonnino wrote that Eustache Dauger could have been a valet of Cardinal Mazarin's treasurer, Antoine-Hercule Picon. A native of Languedoc, Picon, upon entering the service of Colbert after Mazarin's death, might have picked up a valet from Senlis, where the name "Dauger" abounds. In his book, Sonnino asserts that Mazarin led a double life, "one as a statesman, the other as a loan shark", and that one of the clients he embezzled was Henrietta Maria, the widow of Charles I of England. According to Sonnino's theory, Louis XIV was complicit and instructed his ambassador in England to stonewall Charles II over the return of his parents' possessions. In 1669, however, Louis wanted to enlist Charles in a war against the Dutch and therefore worried about the subject of Mazarin's estate entering into the negotiations. Sonnino concludes by stating that Eustache Dauger, who might have been Picon's valet, was arrested and incarcerated for revealing something about the disposition of Mazarin's fortune, and that this is why he was threatened with death if he disclosed anything about his past.

In 2021, British historian Josephine Wilkinson mentioned the theory proposed by French historian Bernard Caire in 1987, whereby "Eustache" was not the prisoner's first name but his real surname. Since French historian Jean-Christian Petitfils had earlier asserted that "Dauger" was a misspelling of "Danger" (or d'Angers), Caire suggested that this appellation was used to indicate the prisoner originated from the town of Angers. (Note: In 1970, Petitfils asserted that, in the first letter about the prisoner, Louvois wrote his name as "Eustache Danger", and that later transcriptions of the name misinterpreted the letter "n" as a "u". In 1987, Caire suggested that "Eustache" was the prisoner's surname, and that "Danger", as well as later spellings of "Dangers" or "d'Angers" in the correspondence related to this prisoner, referred to Angers as his place of birth or the town with which he was mostly associated.) Wilkinson also supported the theory proposed by Petitfils—and by Jules Lair in 1890—that, as a valet (perhaps to Henrietta of England), this "Eustache" had committed some indiscretion which risked compromising the relations between Louis XIV and Charles II at a sensitive time during the negotiations of the Secret Treaty of Dover against the Dutch Republic. In July 1669, Louis had suddenly and inexplicably fallen out with Henrietta and, since the two had previously been very close, it did not go unnoticed. Wilkinson therefore suggested a link between this event and this valet's arrest in Calais later that month.

== Historical documents and archives ==
=== History of the Bastille archives ===
When the Bastille was stormed on 14 July 1789, the mob were surprised to find only seven prisoners, (Note: These seven prisoners included four forgers: Béchade, Laroche, La Corrège and Pujade; they had falsified bills of exchange to defraud two Parisian bankers. During their trial at the Grand Châtelet, they were being held at the Bastille, where they were consulting daily with their lawyers. The fifth prisoner was the young Comte de Solages, who had committed a heinous crime and was held at the Bastille in consideration for his family, who were paying his board. The remaining two were mad men: Tavernier and de Whyte, who should have been in an asylum and were soon transferred to the Asile de Charenton.) as well as a room full of neatly kept boxes containing documents that had been carefully filed since 1659. These archives held records, not only of all the prisoners who had been incarcerated there, but also of all the individuals who had been locked up, banished into exile, or simply tried within the limits of Paris as a result of a lettre de cachet. Throughout the 18th century, archivists had been working zealously at keeping these records in good order and which, on the eve of the French revolution, had amounted to hundreds of thousands of documents.

As the fortress was being ransacked, the pillaging lasted for two days during which documents were burned, torn, thrown from the top of towers into the moats and trailed through the mud. Many documents were stolen, or taken away by collectors, writers, lawyers, and even by Pierre Lubrowski, an attaché in the Russian embassy—who sold them to emperor Alexander I in 1805, when they were deposited at the Hermitage Palace—and many ended up dispersed throughout France and the rest of Europe. A company of soldiers was posted on 15 July to guard the fortress and, in particular, to prevent any more looting of the archives. On 16 July, the Electoral Assembly created a commission assigned to rescue the archives; on arrival at the fortress, they found that many boxes had been emptied or destroyed, leaving an enormous pile of papers in a complete state of disorder. During the session of 24 July, the Electoral Assembly passed a resolution enjoining citizens to return documents to the Hôtel de Ville; restitutions were numerous and the surviving documents eventually stored at the city's library, then located at the convent of Saint-Louis-de-la-Culture. (Note: "Bibliothèque de la Bastille. 1017. — Catalogue des livres en feuilles, reliés et brochés, qui sont déposés à Saint-Louis-de-la-Culture, provenant de la Bastille, mis en ordre par le sieur Poinçot, libraire, certifié véritable par Poinçot et par Agier, ci-devant commissaire aux papiers de la Bastille. 14 juin—15 septembre 1790. Bibl. de l'Arsenal, Mss., no. 6495, fol. 1. Cf. ALFRED FRANKLIN, les Anciennes Bibliothèques de Paris, t. III, p. 201, 292." Translation: "Bibliothèque de la Bastille. Item #1017. — Catalogue of books in loose pages, bound in leather or in paper, which were deposited at Saint-Louis-de-la-Culture, originally from the Bastille, set in order by Mr. Poinçot, librarian, certified genuine by Poinçot and by Agier, aforementioned commissioner of the Bastille papers. 14 June—15 September 1790.")

On 22 April 1797, Hubert-Pascal Ameilhon was appointed chief librarian of the Bibliothèque de l'Arsenal and obtained a decree that secured the Bastille archive under his care. However, the librarians were so daunted by this volume of 600,000 documents that they stored them in a backroom, where they languished for over forty years. In 1840, François Ravaisson found a mass of old papers under the floor in his kitchen at the Arsenal library and realised he had rediscovered the archives of the Bastille, which required a further fifty years of laborious restoration; the documents were numbered, and a catalogue was compiled and published as the 20th century was about to dawn. Eventually, the archives of the Bastille were made available for consultation by any visitor to the Arsenal library, in rooms specially fitted up for them.

=== Other archives ===
In addition to the Bibliothèque de l'Arsenal, several other archives host historical documents that were consulted by historians researching the enigma of the Man in the Iron Mask: the Archives of the Foreign Ministry (Archives des Affaires étrangères), the Archives Nationales, the Bibliothèque nationale de France, the Sainte-Geneviève Library, and the Service Historique de la Défense (a.k.a. Anciennes Archives de la Guerre).

=== Historians of the Man in the Iron Mask ===
In his historical essay published in 1965 and expanded in 1973, Marcel Pagnol praised a number of historians who consulted the archives with the goal of elucidating the enigma of the Man in the Iron Mask: Joseph Delort (1789–1847), Marius Topin (1838–1895), Théodore Iung (1833–1896), Maurice Duvivier (18??–1936), and Georges Mongrédien (1901–1980). Along with Pierre Roux-Fazillac (1746–1833), François Ravaisson (1811–1884), Jules Loiseleur (1816–1900), Jules Lair (1836–1907), and Frantz Funck-Brentano (1862–1947), these historians uncovered and published the bulk of historical documents that enabled some progress to be made towards that goal.

In particular, Mongrédien was the first to publish (1952) a complete reference of historical documents on which previous authors had relied only selectively. He was also one of the few historians who did not champion any particular candidate, (Note: The other historians who have not proposed a candidate are: Augustin Cabanès, Jules Loiseleur and Fernand Bournon, as well as John Noone.) preferring instead to review and analyse objectively the facts revealed by all the documents. Giving full credit to Jules Lair for being the first to propose the candidacy of "Eustache Dauger" in 1890, Mongrédien demonstrated that, among all the state prisoners who were ever in the custody of Saint-Mars, only the one arrested under that name in 1669 could have died in the Bastille in 1703, and was therefore the only possible candidate for the man in the mask. Although he also pointed out that no documents had yet been found that revealed either the real identity of this prisoner or the cause of his long incarceration, Mongrédien's work was significant in that it made it possible to eliminate all the candidates whose vital dates, or life circumstances for the period of 1669–1703, were already known to modern historians.

In October 1965, Mongrédien published a review, in the journal La Revue des Deux Mondes, of the first edition of Pagnol's essay. At the end of this review, Mongrédien mentioned being told that the Archives of the Ministry of Defense located at the Château de Vincennes still held unsorted and uncatalogued bundles of Louvois's correspondence. He posited that, if this were the case, then these bundles might contain a letter from July 1669 revealing the reasons for "Eustache Dauger"'s arrest near Dunkirk.

== In popular culture ==
=== Literature ===
In addition to being the subject of scholarly research carried out by historians, the Man in the Iron Mask inspired literary works of fiction, many of which elaborate on the legend of the prisoner being a twin brother of Louis XIV, such as Alexandre Dumas's popular novel, Le Vicomte de Bragelonne (1850). (Note: Ten years before publishing the novel, Dumas had reviewed the popular theories about the prisoner extant in his time in the chapter "L'homme au masque de fer", published in the eighth volume of his non-fiction Crimes Célèbres (1840).)

==== Novels ====
- Mouhy, Charles de Fieux, Chevalier de, (1747). Le Masque de Fer ou les Aventures admirables du Père et du Fils. The Hague: Pierre de Hondt.
- Regnault-Warin, Jean-Joseph (1804). L'Homme Au Masque de Fer, 4 vol. in-12. Paris: Frechet.
- Guénard Brossin de Méré, Élisabeth (1821). Histoire de l'Homme Au Masque de Fer, ou les Illustres Jumeaux, 4 vol. Paris: Lebègue.
- Dumas, Alexandre (1848–1850). Le Vicomte de Bragelonne, ou Dix ans plus tard, 19 vol. Paris: Michel Lévy.
- Letourneur, L. (1849). Histoire de l'Homme au masque de fer. Nancy.
- Leynadier, Camille (1857). Le Masque de fer. Paris.
- Meynaud, Joachim (1869) [1st pub. 1858]. Le Masque de fer, journal de sa captivité à Sainte-Marguerite. Nancy: Wagner.
- Robville de, T. (1865). L'Homme au masque de fer ou Les Deux Jumeaux. Paris.
- Koenig, E. A. (1873). L'Homme au masque de fer, ou le somnambule de Paris. Zurich: Robert.
- Féré, Octave (1876). L'Homme au masque de fer. Paris.
- Du Boisgobey, Fortuné (1878). Les deux merles de M. de Saint-Mars. Paris: E. Dentu.
- Ladoucette, Edmond (1910). Le Masque de fer. Paris: A. Fayard.
- Féval (fils), Paul; Lassez, Michel (1928). L'évasion du masque de fer. Paris: A. Fayard.
- Dunan, Renée (1929). Le masque de fer ou l'amour prisonnier. Paris: Bibliothèque des Curieux.
- Bernède, Arthur (1930). L'Homme au masque de fer. Paris: Éditions Tallandier.
- Kerleck de, Jean (1931) [1st pub. 1927]. La Maîtresse du Masque de Fer. Paris: Baudinière.
- Refreger, Omer (alias Léo Malet) (1945). L'Évasion du Masque de fer. Paris: Les Éditions et Revues Françaises.
- Masini de, Clément (1964). La Plus dramatique énigme du 18ème siècle : la véritable histoire de l'homme au masque de fer. Paris: Édition du Scorpion.
- Cyrille (1966). Masques de fer. Paris: Éditions Alsatia.
- Desprat, Jean-Paul (1991). Le Secret des Bourbons. Paris: André Balland. ISBN 978-2-7158-0835-5.
- Dufreigne, Jean-Pierre (1993). Le Dernier Amour d'Aramis. Paris: Grasset. ISBN 978-2-2464-2821-3.
- Benzoni, Juliette (1998). Secret d'État, tome III, Le Prisonnier masqué. Paris: Plon. ISBN 978-2-2591-8590-5.

==== Plays ====
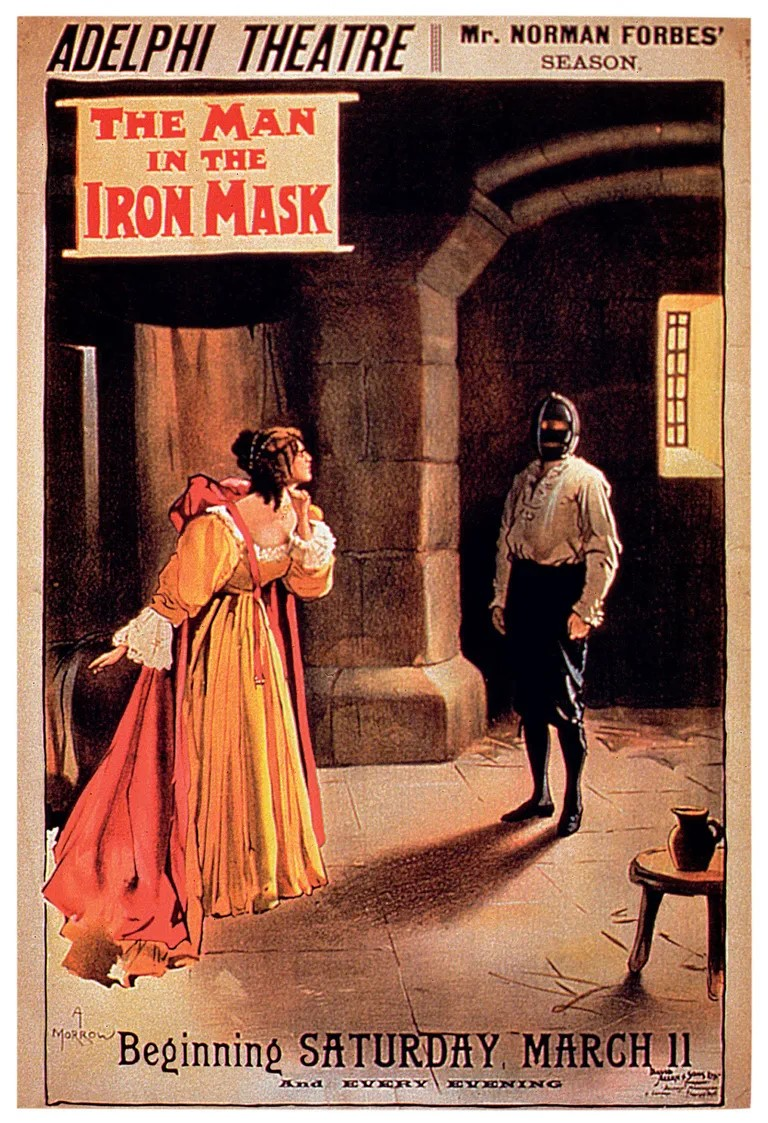
Albert Morrow's poster for Max Goldberg's play at the London Adelphi theatre, starring Norman Forbes (1899).

- Arnould (1790). L'Homme au masque de fer ou le Souterrain. Pantomime in four acts, performed at the Théâtre de l'Ambigu-Comique on 7 January 1790.
- Le Grand, Jérôme (1791). Louis XIV et le Masque de fer ou Les Princes jumeaux. Tragedy in five acts and in verse, first performed at the Théâtre Molière in Paris on 24 September 1791.
- Arnould & Fournier (1831). L'Homme au masque de fer. Drama in five acts, performed at the Théâtre de l'Odéon on 3 August 1831.
- Serle, Thomas James (1832). The Man in the Iron Mask : an historical play in five acts. First performed at the Royal Coburg Theatre, 1832.
- Hugo, Victor (1839). Les Jumeaux. Unfinished drama. Paris, 1884.
- Dumas, Alexandre (1861). Le Prisonnier de la Bastille. Drama in five acts, first performed at the Théâtre du Cirque Impérial on 22 March 1861.
- Maurevert, Georges (1884). Le Masque de fer. Fantasy in one act. Paris.
- Max Goldberg (1899). The Man in the Iron Mask. Performed at the London Adelphi Theatre, 11 March–20 May 1899 (68 perf.). The cast included Norman Forbes, Valli Valli, and William L. Abingdon.
- Villia (1909). L'Homme au masque de fer. Drama in three acts, preceded by a historical review of recent works. Paris.
- Rostand, Maurice (1923). Le Masque de fer. Play in four acts and in verse, first performed at the Théâtre Cora Laparcerie on 1 October 1923.
- Richter, Charles de (1955). Le Masque de fer. Comedy in one act. Toulon.

==== Poems ====
- Vigny, Alfred de, (1821). La Prison, in Poèmes antiques et modernes (1826). Paris: Urbain Canel.
- Quinet, Benoît (1837). Derniers moments de l'Homme au masque de fer. Dramatic poem. Bruxelles: Hauman, Cattoir et Cie.
- Leconte, Sebastien-Charles (1911). Le Masque de fer. Paris: Mercure de France.

=== Music ===
- John St John (1789). The Island of St. Marguerite (Opera).
- Hugo Riesenfeld (1929). Soundtrack of the film The Iron Mask.
- Lud Gluskin & Lucien Moraweck (1939). Soundtrack of the film The Man in the Iron Mask.
- Allyn Ferguson (1977). Soundtrack of the film The Man in the Iron Mask.
- Billy Bragg (1983). "The Man in the Iron Mask" (Song), in Life's a Riot with Spy vs Spy.
- Paul Young (1985). "The Man in the Iron Mask" (Song), in The Secret of Association.
- Nick Glennie-Smith (1998). Soundtrack of the film The Man in the Iron Mask.
- Heartland (2002). "The Man in the Iron Mask" (Song), in Communication Down.
- Samurai Of Prog (2023). The Man in the Iron Mask (Album).

=== Film and television ===
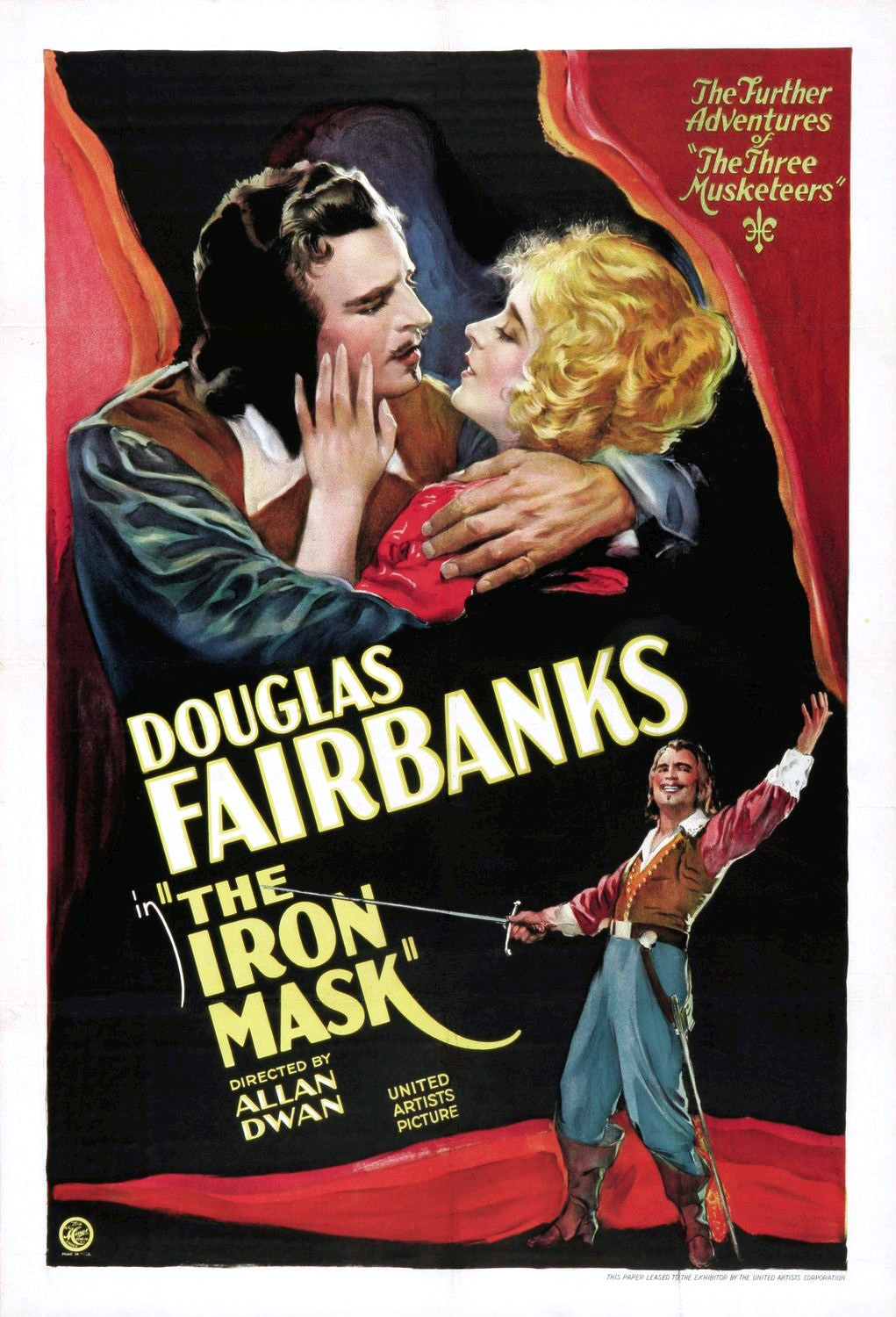
Poster of the 1929 film, starring Douglas Fairbanks.

Several films have been made around the mystery of the Man in the Iron Mask, including: The Iron Mask (1929) starring Douglas Fairbanks; The Man in the Iron Mask (1939) starting Louis Hayward; the British television production starring Richard Chamberlain (1977); and the American film starring Leonardo DiCaprio (1998). These films were all loosely adapted from Dumas' book The Viscount of Bragelonne/Between Two Kings, where the prisoner was an identical twin of Louis XIV and made to wear an iron mask, per the legend created by Voltaire.

In the second season of the television show The Flash in 2014, the Man in the Iron Mask is held hostage by Hunter Zolomon/Zoom, who pretends to be the superhero Jay Garrick/Flash. The Man in the Iron Mask is eventually revealed to be the real Jay Garrick of his universe, and a doppelganger of Henry Allen, father of Barry Allen/The Flash.

== Gallery ==
Fictional depictions of the Man in the Iron Mask
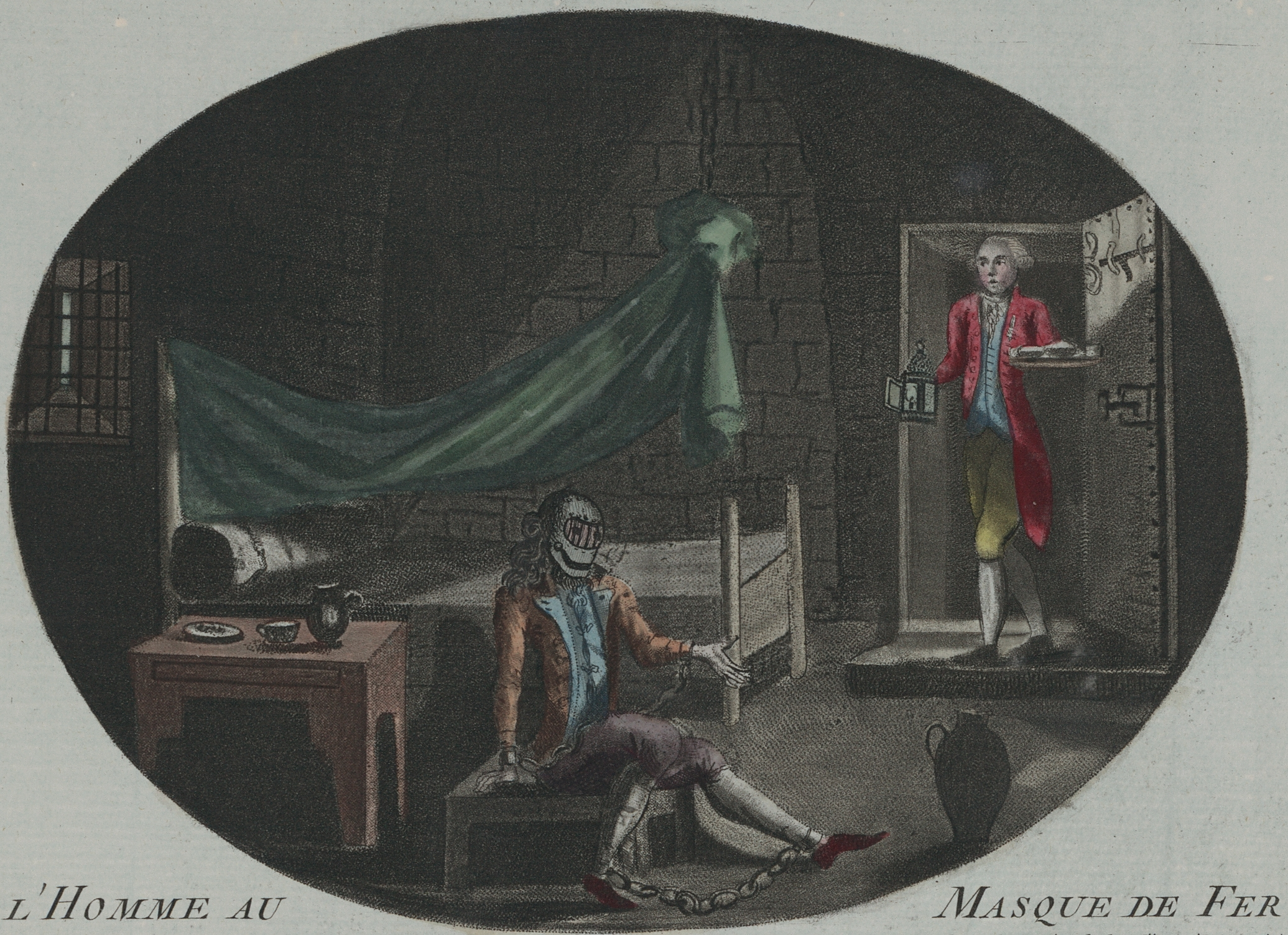
L'Homme au Masque de Fer.
Anonymous print (1789)

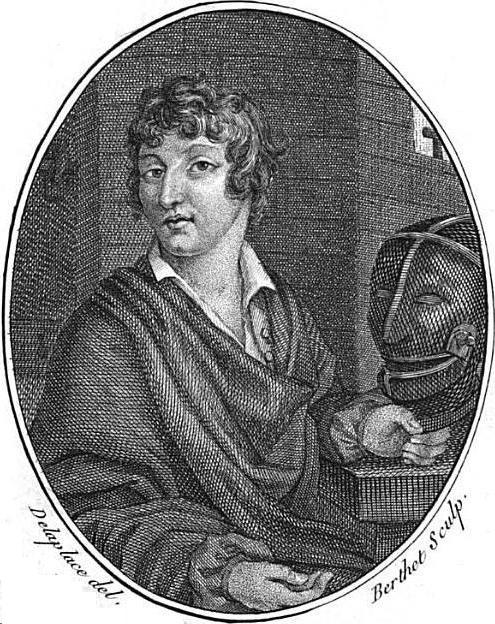
L'Homme au masque de fer,
by Jean-Joseph Regnault-Warin (1804)

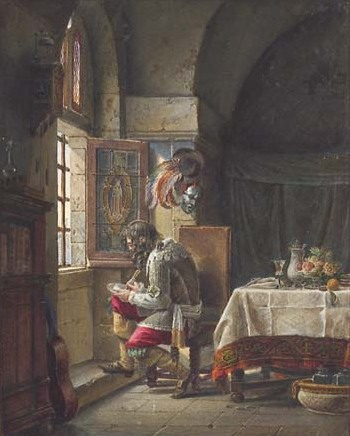
Le Masque de fer dans sa prison des îles Sainte Marguerite,
by Jean-Antoine Laurent (c. 1814)

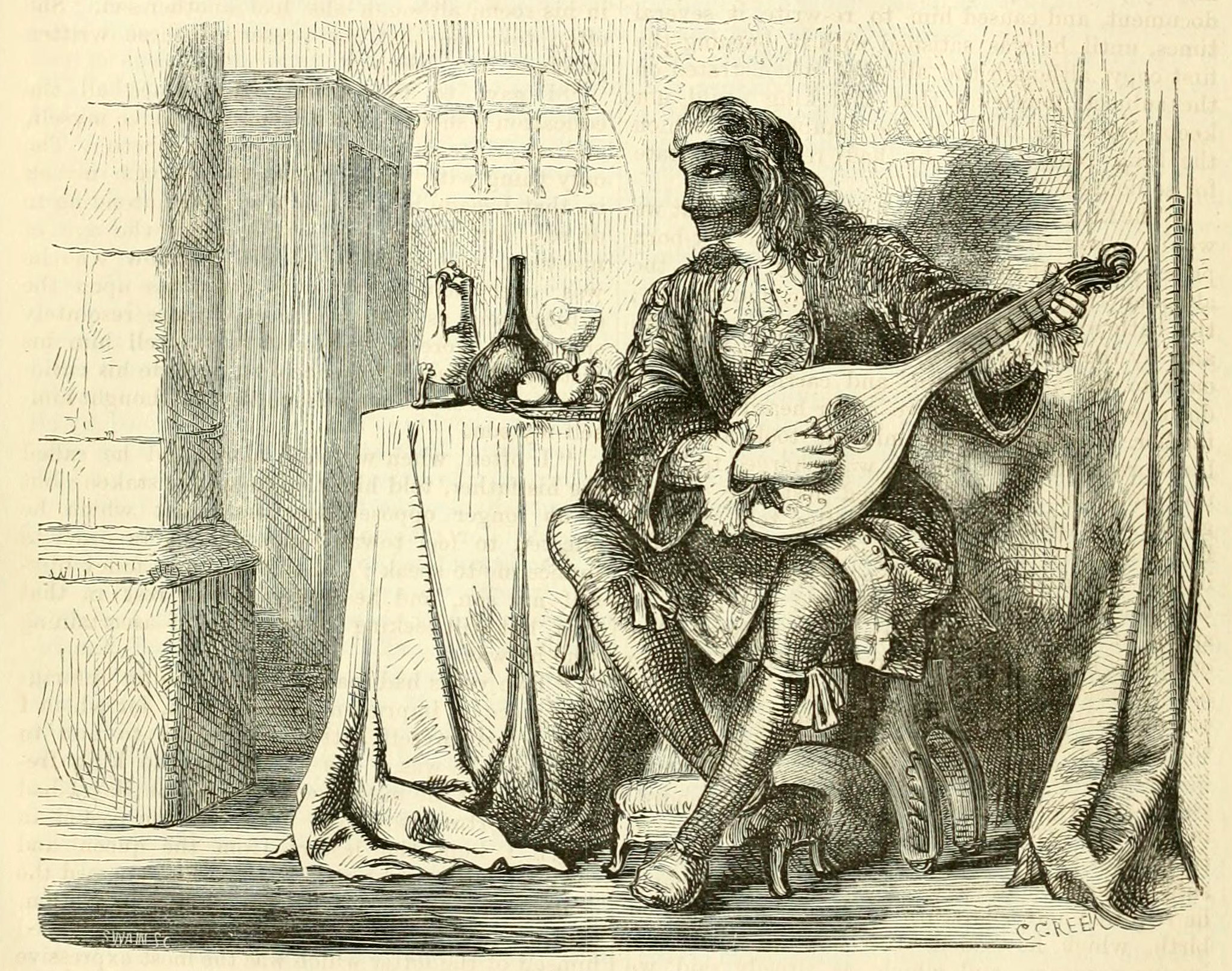
The Man in the Iron Mask,
in Once a Week (1860)

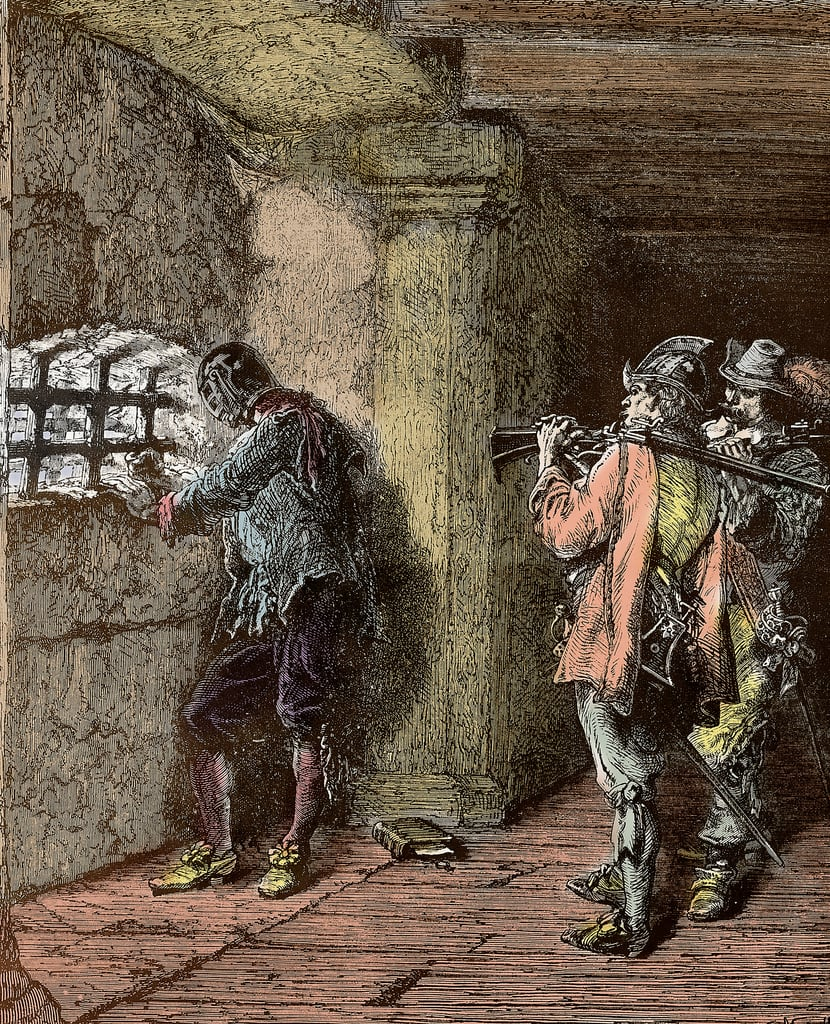
L'homme au masque de fer,
by Alphonse de Neuville (c. 1872)

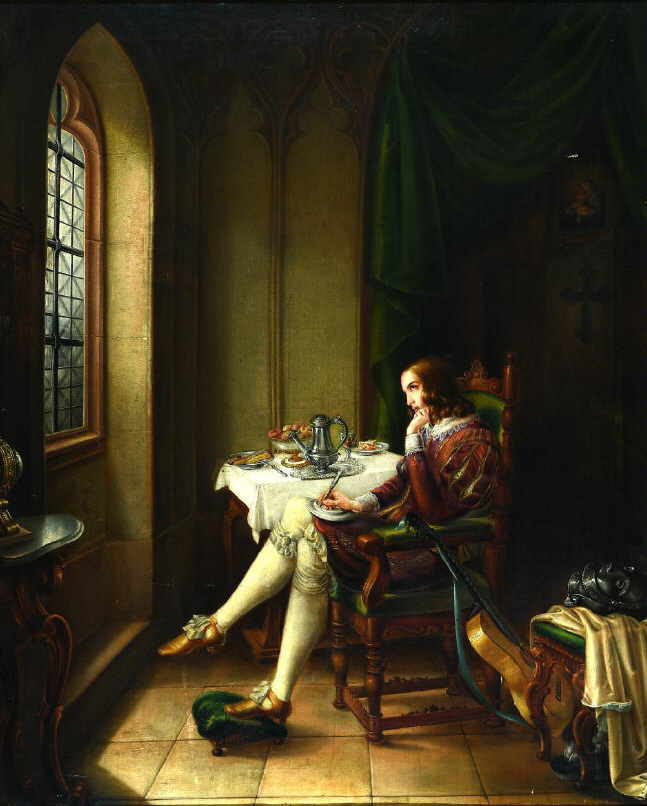
The Man in the Iron Mask,
by Unknown (19th century)
