= Jean-Louis Giraud Soulavie =

French clergyman, geologist, and writer

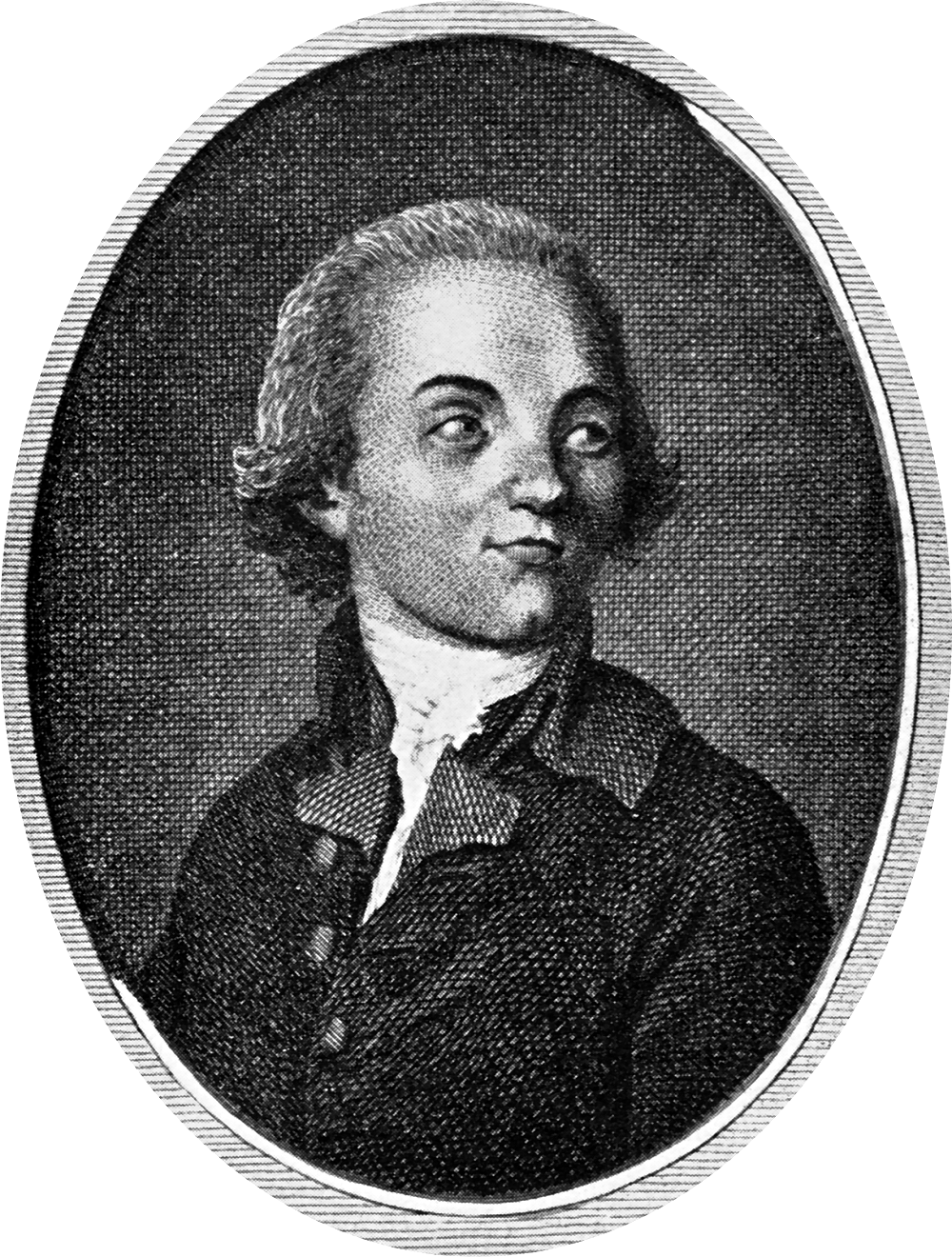
Engraving by icolas-François-Joseph Masquelier, 1792.

Jean-Louis Giraud Soulavie (8 July 1752 – 11 March 1813) was a French clergyman, geologist, and writer. He was among the first to recognize ecological constraints in the distribution of species and noted altitudinal limits to some plants in 1784, drawing transverse distribution maps about 23 ahead of Humboldt and Bonpland. Soulavie was an active participant in the French Revolution, joining the Jacobin club, and survived despite being in favour of Robespierre. His geological studies suggested to him that the earth was several million years old but on orders from the church, he eschewed geology.

== Life and work ==
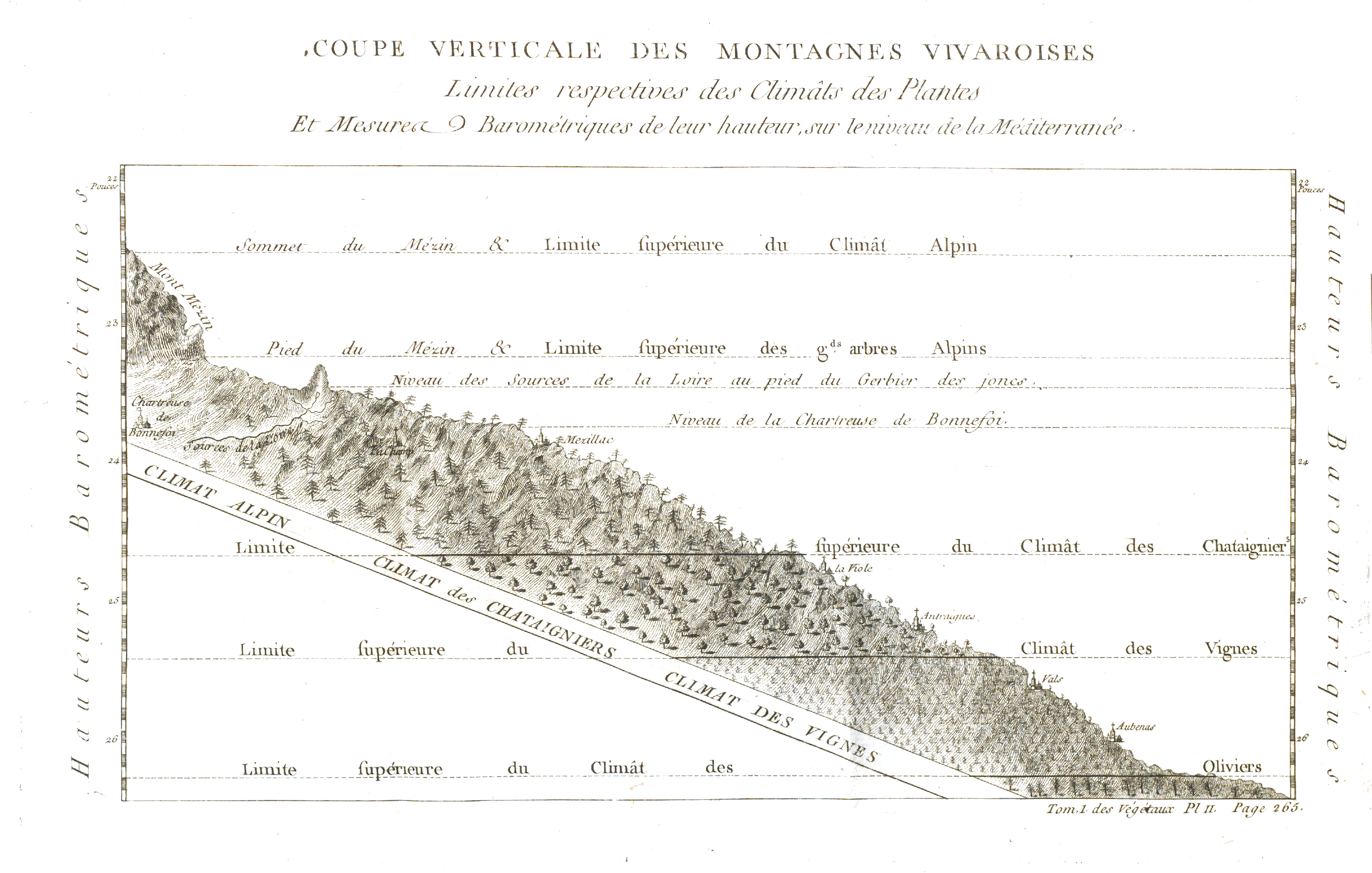
Soulavie's chart of plant altitudinal distributions was among the first to illustrate a transverse section of plant distribution by altitude

Born in Ardèche, France, he began his career at the Saint-Nicolas college and the Saint-Esprit seminary being ordained a priest in 1776. He initially served as vicar in Antraigues and moved around. Despite his ecclesiastical office, he spent much of his time studying the geology of his home in Southern France until he moved to Paris in 1778.

He was elected as a member of the American Philosophical Society in 1786.

In 1780, with the backing of the Académie des Sciences, he began publishing volumes of his Histoire naturelle de la France Méridionale (1780–1784), which documented his geological and natural studies. Published in seven volumes, he was forced by the church to stop writing on geology after the fifth as it went against a literal reading of the bible. His suggestion on erosion and sediment accumulation implied that the earth was millions of years old. After arguments with Abbe Augustin de Barruel, the first volume was censored and republished. Soulavie's work influenced the thinking of Benjamin Franklin. He frequented the salons of Paris and joined the Académie des Inscriptions et Belles-lettres. Upon the onset of the French Revolution, he backed the liberal reformists, represented the clergy at the Estates-General, and supported the Civil Constitution of the Clergy (1790).

Two years later, he married and gained permission from the Pope to leave the priesthood. Having established himself in the literary world after compiling and publishing memoirs and correspondences of notable French historical figures, he earned the task of doing the same for the then recently dethroned King Louis XVI.

He died in Paris.
