= Henri Griffet =

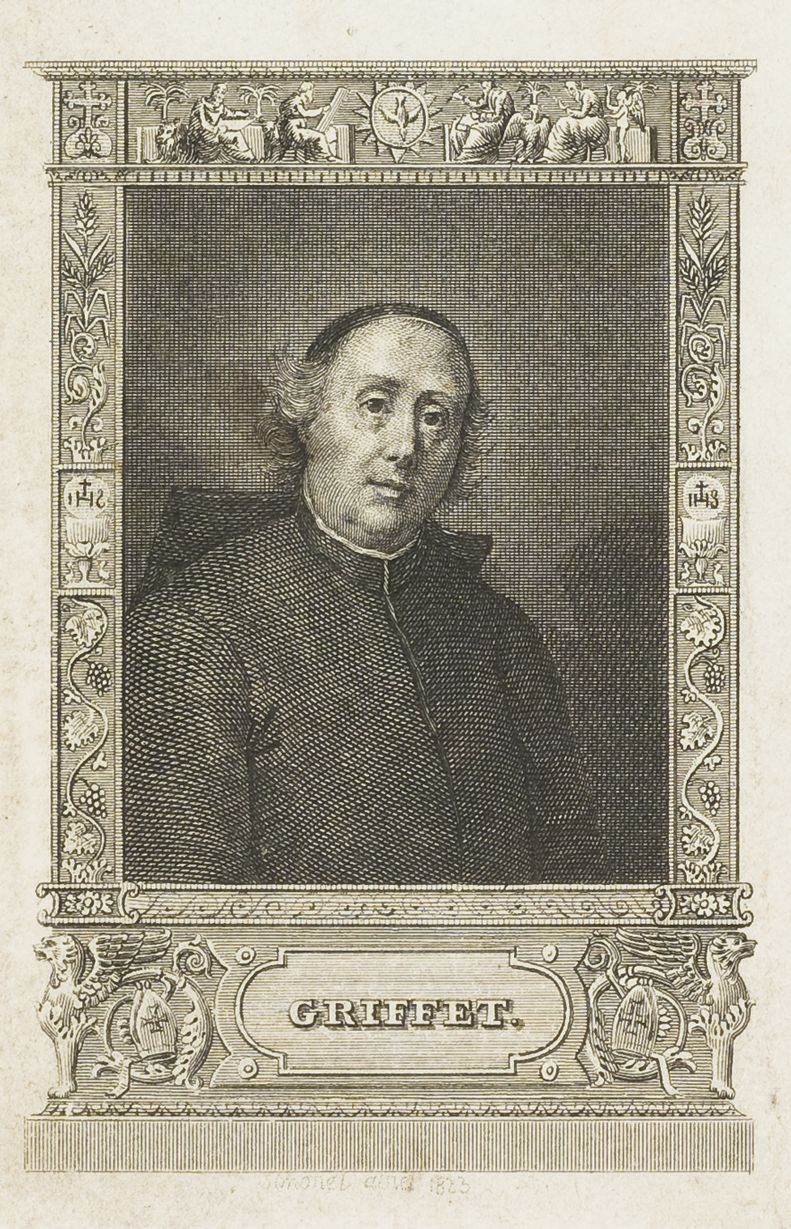
Henri Griffet

Henri Griffet (1698–1771) was a leading Jesuit writer. He was born at Moulins and educated at the College of Louis le Grand in Paris where he assisted Charles Porée in his belle-lettres lectures.

He became preacher to the king, and retired to Brussels after abolition of the order. He died in Brussels.

== Publications ==
- 1756: Gabriel Daniel's 17-vol Histoire de France depuis l'établissement de la monarchie française (first complete edition, 1713), which was republished in 1720, 1721, 1725, 1742, and (the last edition, with notes by Henri Griffet) 1755–1760. Daniel published an abridgment in 1724 (English trans., 1726), and another abridgment was published by Dorival in 1751.
- 1758 (Paris: Histoire du règne de Louis XIII, roi de France et de Navarre)
- Liege 1767 (ed. with Henri Charles de La Trémoille): Mémoires de Henri-Charles de la Tremoille, prince de Tarente
- 1770 (Liege): A treatise on the different kinds of proof employed in establishing historical facts (Traité des différentes sortes de preuves qui servent à établir la vérité historique)
- Sermons, and other works of Piety
- An edition of Memoirs of Profane History by d'Avrigny
