= Bénigne Dauvergne de Saint-Mars =

French prison governor

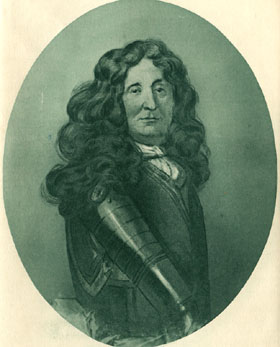
Saint-Mars

Bénigne d'Auvergne de Saint-Mars was a French prison governor in the late 17th and early 18th century. He is best known as the apparent keeper of the Man in the Iron Mask. According to letters written by Saint-Mars to various officials and ministers of France, he had in his custody a prisoner of State, whom he carried with him from Pinerolo to the Lérins Islands, and later to the Bastille.

From 1665 to the spring of 1681, Saint-Mars was the Officer-in-Charge of the donjon (the main tower) of the fortress Pinerolo (in French Pignerol, 40 kilometers WSW of Turin, Italy), which then belonged to France. Saint-Mars acted as governor of the nearby fortified castle of Exilles from 1681.

In 1687, Saint-Mars became the governor of two islands, Île Sainte-Marguerite and Île Saint-Honorat, in the gulf of Cannes until 1698. (these islands are now called the Lérins Islands). At that time he became governor of the Bastille in Paris, a post he held until his death on 18 September 1708.
