= Jean-Joseph Regnault-Warin =

French novelist and playwright (1773–1844)

Jean-Baptiste-Joseph Junbient Philadelphe Regnault-Warin (28 December 1773, Bar-le-Duc – 4 November 1844, Paris) was an 18th–19th-century French novelist, playwright and pamphleteer.

== Main publications ==
- Éléments de politique, 1790;
- La Constitution française mise à la portée de tout le monde, 2 vol. in-8°, Paris 1791;
- Éloge de Mirabeau;
- Vie de J. Pétion, maire de Paris : Cours d’études encyclopédique;
- La Caverne de Strozi;
- Homéo et Juliette, historical novel;
- Le Cimetière de la Madeleine, 4 vol. in-12, Paris, 1800; (the book which had several printings was translated into different languages.)
- La Jeunesse de Figaro;
- Le Tonneau de Diogène, 2 vol. in-12;
- Les Prisonniers du Temple, sequel to Cimetière de la Madeleine, 3 vol. in-12;
- Le Paquebot de Calais à Douvres, roman politique et moral, in 12, 1802; (police authorized the publication only with many warnings inserted.)
- Spinalba, novel, 4 vol. in-12,1803;
- L’Homme au masque de fer, 4 vol. in-12, 1804;
- Loisirs littéraires, 1804;
- Mme de Maintenon, 4 vol. in-12;
- Henri II, duc de Montmorency, maréchal de France, historical novel, in-8°, 1815;
- L’Esprit de Mme de Staël, 2 vol. in-8°;
- Biographie héroïque, in-12. 1818;
- Mémoires et Correspondance de l’impératrice Joséphine, 2 vol. in-8°; (this book was disowned by Prince Eugène Beauharnais).
- Les Carbonari, ou le Livre de sang, 2 vol. in-12;
- Mémoires pour servir à la vie de Lafayette, 2 vol in-8°, 1824;
- Chronique indiscrète du XIXe, in-8°, 1825.
