= Le Tellier =

Coat of arms of the Le Tellier family

The Le Tellier family is a noted French noble family, originally from Chaville, ennobled in 1574 and later acquired the title of Marquis de Louvois. Members of the family distinguished themselves under the Ancien Régime as major political, ecclesiastical and military figures.

Letellier is also a French surname.

== Notable people ==
- Elias Le Tellier, goldsmith at the Stuart courts
- Camille le Tellier de Louvois (1675–1718), French cleric
- Charles-Maurice Le Tellier (1642–1710), Archbishop of Reims
- Francis Letellier (born 1964), French journalist
- François-Michel le Tellier, Marquis de Louvois (1641–1691)
- Hervé Le Tellier (born 1957), French writer
- Louis Charles César Le Tellier, duc d'Estrées (1695–1771)
- Louis François Marie Le Tellier (1668–1701), French statesman
- Luc Letellier de St-Just (1820–1881), Canadian politician
- Louis LeTellier (1887–1975), football coach
- Michel Le Tellier (1603–1685), French statesman
- Robert Letellier (born 1953), South African writer on music

== See also ==
- Letellier, Manitoba
- ,
