= Le secret du Masque de Fer =

1965 historical essay by Marcel Pagnol

Updated 1973 edition (publ. Editions de Provence)

Le secret du Masque de Fer (The secret of the Iron Mask) is a historical essay by French novelist Marcel Pagnol, who identified the famous prisoner in the iron mask as the twin brother of Louis XIV, born after him and imprisoned for life in 1669 for having conspired against the King. The essay was published for the first time in 1965 under the title Le Masque de fer (The Iron Mask), and updated in 1973, completed in particular with research on James de la Cloche, identified as the twin bearing this name in his youth.

Raised by the midwife Lady Perronette, the twin was taken to the island of Jersey at the age of six, where he was brought up by Marguerite Carteret, daughter of the island's noblest family. Having converted to Catholicism in 1667, he entered the Jesuit novitiate in Rome in April 1668. He then returned to London at the end of 1668 where he is thought to have conspired against Louis XIV alongside a certain Roux de Marcilly, who was denounced and executed in June 1669.

The accomplice of Roux, passing for his valet, Martin, and whom Marcel Pagnol in turn identified as the twin brother of Louis XIV, was also arrested and taken to Calais in July 1669, then brought to Pignerol prison under the custody of the governor Saint-Mars, where he remained until 1681. He was given the name of "Eustache Dauger", designating him as a simple valet. Still under the custody of Saint Mars, he was transferred to the fort of Exilles then to the island of Sainte-Marguerite in 1687, and finally to the Bastille in 1698, where he died in 1703 after 34 years in captivity.

Marcel Pagnol also provides information intended to demonstrate that the prisoner cannot be identified as a valet or as Count Matthioli. He thus contradicts other historians' theories which, in his view, resulted from false information deliberately disseminated by the authorities of the period who, foreseeing later examination of the correspondence, supposedly laid false trails to try to conceal the prisoner's real identity.

== Chronology ==
5 September 1638 – Louis XIV born in Saint-Germain en Laye. Queen Anne of Austria secretly gave birth to a second child, who was brought up in the countryside by the midwife Lady Perronette.

1644 – The Carteret family, residing on the island of Jersey, adopt a 6-year-old child brought to them by Lady Perronette, who is then raised by their daughter Marguerite. In 1657, Marguerite Carteret married Jean de la Cloche, who gives his name to James.

1668 – James de la Cloche takes his novitiate at the Jesuit Institute of Rome, introducing himself as "Prince Stuart", son of King Charles II.

June 1669 - Trial and execution of Roux De Marcilly for a plot against King Louis XIV.

July 1669 - The "valet Martin", presumed accomplice of Roux De Marcilly, is arrested and taken to Calais.

24 August 1669 – Eustache Dauger arrives in Pignerol where he is imprisoned under the custody of governor Saint-Mars.

1671 – Imprisonment of Lauzun in Pignerol

1679 – Imprisonment of Count Matthioli in Pignerol

1680 – Death in Pignerol of Nicolas Fouquet, who had been imprisoned since 1664. Announcement of the release of the prisoner "Eustache Dauger" and La Rivière, Fouquet's valet.

1681 – Saint-Mars is appointed governor of the Fort of Exilles in the Alps, and leaves for there with all his general staff and his company, and just two prisoners: Dauger and La Rivière, a valet by profession. Lauzun is released.

1687 - Saint Mars is appointed governor of the islands of Sainte-Marguerite and Saint-Honorat de Lérins. He travels to his new post with his free company and Dauger, his sole prisoner, transported in a completely covered carriage. La Rivière dies in Exilles.

1691 - Death of the minister Louvois. His son Barbezieux succeeds him.

1694 - The prison of Pignerol, threatened by a concentration of Italian troops, is evacuated. The prisoners, Matthioli among them, are sent to Sainte-Marguerite. One of the prisoners dies, most probably Matthioli, according to Pagnol.

1698 – Saint-Mars is appointed governor of the Bastille where he arrives, notably, with his masked prisoner.

19 November 1703 - Death of the masked prisoner, who is buried on 20 November at the cemetery of Saint-Paul under the name of Marchialy. Major Rosarges signs the death certificate.

=== Prisoner's movements ===
Pignerol (July 1669 – 1681), Exilles (1681-1687), Sainte-Marguerite (1687-1698) then the Bastille (1698-1703).

==== Names and identifications ====
- 1638-1644: Marcel Pagnol does not mention any first name given to him at birth. Nor does he refer to any baptism, or even membership of the Protestant religion before his conversion to Catholicism in 1667, when he would have been 29 years old;
- James: on the island of Jersey (1644-1657), raised by Marguerite Carteret. Pagnol does not mention any surname prior to "de la Cloche". He does not seem to have borne the name of Carteret.
- James de la Cloche: on Jersey Island (1657-1668). He was given this surname following Marguerite Carteret's marriage to Jean de La Cloche.
- Prince Stuart: name used when he introduced himself at the Jesuit Institute of Rome as the son of Charles II.
- The Valet Martin: accomplice of the conspirator Roux de Marcilly. He is mentioned in some correspondence following the trial of Roux.
- Eustache Dauger: he was introduced under this name by Louvois who announced to Saint-Mars the arrival of the prisoner in Pignerol in July 1669, explaining that "he is only a valet";
- "La Tour" (the tower): this name was suggested by Louvois at the time of his transfer to Exilles in 1681, shortly after the false announcement of the release of "Dauger".
- Marchialy: on the death certificate dated 20 November 1703. It could be a distorted spelling of Count Matthioli's name.

=== Protagonists ===
Louis XIV – King of France (1661-1715)

Charles II – King of England (1660-1685), Louis XIV's first cousin

François Michel Le Tellier, Marquis de Louvois – French Secretary of State for War (1662-1691)

Louis-François-Marie Le Tellier de Barbezieux (Louvois's son) – Secretary of State for War under the reign of Louis XIV (1681-1701)

Bénigne Dauvergne de Saint-Mars, known as Saint-Mars - Marshall of Lodgings of the Musketeers, he was the assistant of D’Artagnan for the arrest of Fouquet in 1661. He was then appointed governor of the state prison of Pignerol in 1664, where he commanded a free company, that is, he took orders only from the King. He was the governor of the prisons of Pignerol (1665-1681), Exilles (1681-1687), the Lérins Islands, and finally the Bastille (1698 until his death in 1708).

Nicolas Fouquet, superintendent of finances (1653-1661), arrested for embezzlement in 1661, found guilty of misappropriation of public funds in 1664, then imprisoned in Pignerol, where he died in 1680;

Count Ercole Antonio Matthioli - deputy to the Duke of Mantoue, imprisoned in Pignerol in 1679 after having negotiated the sale of the stronghold of Casal to Louis XIV. He is thought to have died on the island of Sainte-Marguerite in 1694.

Antonin Nompar de Caumont, Duke of Lauzun - serviceman and French courtier, appointed Lieutenant General of the Armies in 1670. He was imprisoned as he was about to marry the Duchess of Montpensier, first cousin of Louis XIV.

Roux de Marcilly - Leader and coordinator, in 1668, of a Europe-wide plot intended to topple King Louis XIV. He was denounced, kidnapped, and executed in Paris on 21 June 1669.

Eustache Dauger de Cavoye - Brother of Louis Oger de Cavoye, Chief Marshall of Lodgings of King Louis XIV. He was interned around 1668 and is thought to have died in detention in 1679.

== Birth ==
When Cardinal Richelieu was informed by Louis XIII of the Queen's twin pregnancy, he claimed that the second birth would have to be hidden, as the coexistence of two dauphins would inevitably lead to civil war.

The King and the cardinal thus planned the birth to ensure that the Queen's bedroom would be "evacuated" after the first birth. According to custom, the main figures of the Court attended the birth of the first child, who was quickly baptized, then the King took the Court to the Chapel of the Château de Saint-Germain-en-Laye, where a Te Deum was sung in front of about forty people. However, according to Marcel Pagnol, the Te Deum was normally celebrated in a cathedral, in front of a thousand people from all social classes.

Meanwhile, the Queen gave birth to the second child, whom the midwife Lady Perronette immediately hid in her bedroom before taking him to the countryside where she would bring him up as the illegitimate child of a daughter of the nobility.

== James de La Cloche ==
Concerning the prisoner's past, specifically his early years prior to his arrest, Marcel Pagnol identifies the masked prisoner as a certain James de la Cloche, mentioned by some historians, including Lord Acton, Andrew Lang, Miss Carey, M^{gr} Barnes and Emile Laloy.

=== Growing up on the Island of Jersey ===
In 1644, when Queen Henrietta Maria of France, sister of Louis XIII, is about to give birth to Henrietta of England, the midwife Lady Perronette was sent to England by Cardinal Mazarin to assist, taking the twin with her in order to hide him abroad, which was the actual purpose of her journey. After giving birth, Henrietta of France sent Lady Perronette to the Carteret's, the noblest family on the Jersey island, so their daughter Marguerite could raise the child, being introduced as the son of a young noblewoman. It is to the same Carteret family that Henrietta of England sent her son (the future Charles II) during the civil war in 1646.

In 1657 Marguerite married Jean de la Cloche who gave his name to James. Later, finding a striking resemblance between himself and Charles II when seeing his portrait, he was convinced of being the King's son and wished to be legally recognised, like two other illegitimate sons who hence got the dukedom. Marguerite (or probably her father Sir Carteret) approached the King on his behalf, but the latter did not acknowledge him.

=== Jesuit in Rome ===
Afterwards, James did not give up just yet. Knowing via the Carteret family that Charles II was secretly preparing for his conversion to Catholicism, he decided to become a Catholic priest in order to be able to convert Charles II. In 1667, he went to Hamburg to convert to Catholicism, then appeared on 11 April 1668 at the Institute of Jesuit novices in Rome to take his novitiate under the supervision of Father Abbot Oliva. He supported his application with two certificates acknowledging him as "Prince Stuart", King Charles II's son: one from Charles II himself and the other from Queen Christina of Sweden.

Other letters from Charles II arrived at the Institute: Shortly after James's arrival, Father Olivia thus learned that the King was preparing to convert to Catholicism, and that he could only count on his son to convert him as soon as he was ordained as a priest. Charles II promised the throne to James and a generous reward to the Jesuits.

Then, when the upcoming visit of Christina of Sweden to Rome was announced, Father Oliva received a letter from Charles II in which he asked him not to mention James as being his son to the Queen and called James to London in great urgency. James then went off to London. Just before James’ departure, which Marcel Pagnol places in early December 1668, Father Oliva received from Charles II a debt of gratitude. In a Post-scriptum, the latter asked for a payment to James of 800 pounds that he undertook to reimburse to him. According to Marcel Pagnol, Oliva certainly paid that sum to James, believing the authenticity of the letters and royal guarantees.

Comparing the letters from Charles II to Father Oliva with other letters addressed to his sister Henrietta of England, two graphologist experts consulted by Pagnol are positive: the letters sent to Father Oliva are fake, making James a fraud.^{,} Marcel Pagnol's believed in James’ good faith though, admitting that he sincerely believed he was the bastard son of Charles II.

=== Meeting Charles II ===
Still proceeding with the trick of a fake supporting letter from Charles II, James would have requested an audience with Henrietta of England. In light of other correspondence between Charles II and Henrietta of England, Marcel Pagnol establishes that Henrietta received James, and handed him a letter for the attention of Charles II, judiciously leaving to him the responsibility of ordaining James.

When James gave the letter to Charles II in London in early 1669, the latter recognised him and revealed the secret of his birth, which he certainly inherited from his mother Henrietta of France. Learning that he should be in reign instead of his twin brother, James is sent by Charles II to Roux de Marcilly who is leading a conspiracy against Louis XIV.

== Roux de Marcilly's conspiracy (1668–1669) ==
In 1668, Roux de Marcilly was the head and coordinator of a plot against King of France Louis XIV. In a socio-political context of persecution of Huguenots and famine, the plot was on a European scale. The conspiracy aimed at overturning Louis XIV's government and change into republic provinces like Provence, Dauphiné and Languedoc, with the military support of Switzerland, Spain and United Netherlands (Dutch Republic). Based in London, Roux was betrayed, denounced in May 1668, illegally kidnapped in Switzerland and jailed, and then condemned to death by "breaking on the wheel" in Paris on 21 June 1669.

Marcel Pagnol recreated, through various correspondences and his own interpretation of them, the chronology of the arrest of the accomplice who would later be known as the famous Man in the Iron Mask. He was said to be made out to be Martin, Roux de Marcilly's valet, in order to hide his true identity.

=== Denunciation and condemnation ===
In London, at the start of May 1668, Sir Samuel Morland, a diplomat and ancient member of the Parliament, earned the trust of Roux de Marcilly. Morland denounced the conspirator to Henri de Massue de Rouvigny, the ambassador extraordinary of France in London. Skeptical at first, Rouvigny soon decided to arrange a dinner in the honour of Roux, aiming to hear his plans: During this dinner, Morland asked Roux a series of questions prepared in advance by de Rouvigny who, hidden in a cabinet, wrote down all the answers.

Straight after, de Rouvigny sent a long letter to King Louis XIV, giving all the details to denounce Roux, his accomplices, contacts and current moves. In his essay, Marcel Pagnol reproduced in extenso the letter from the ambassador de Rouvigny to Louis XIV, which denounced the conspirator and his accomplices. This letter was found in the archives of the Ministry of Affaires étrangères (Foreign Affairs).

However, this letter provided little information on the identity of Roux de Marcilly and his occupations in London, only briefly referring to a military past. de Rouvigny denounced an accomplice called Balthazar based in Geneva, and also named the Marquis of Castelo Rodrigo in Spain, King of England Charles II (first cousin of Louis XIV) and his brother the Duke of York as being well aware of the plot and linked with Roux.

In spite of his long meetings with the Duke of York and State Secretary Md Arlington, Roux said he was disappointed by the lack of cooperation of England, reluctant to launch the first attacks on France. On the other hand, Roux was much more confident about the massive support of Spain and Switzerland. Marcel Pagnol reckons that Roux's plan had very good chances of success, because of the socio-political context of persecution of Protestants and famine.

After Rouvigny's report, Roux, who had been warned of the danger, fled to Switzerland where he took refuge with his friend Balthazar at the end of February 1669. In defiance of the Swiss sovereignty, Louis XIV had him kidnapped.

On 19 May 1669 (almost one year after the letter that denounced him), Roux was made prisoner and sent to the Bastille, where the Secretary of State for Foreign Affairs M^{gr} de Lionne questions him under torture. Louis XIV had his trial sped up to only 2 days: Roux de Marcilly was executed by "breaking on the wheel" in public in Paris on 21 June 1669. Roux was said to have been gagged for his execution.

=== The valet Martin ===
Active research went on in the days following the execution of Roux de Marcilly, much likely to further avowals and revelations he gave away while being tortured. On 12 June 1669, while the plot was already known and everything was in place for the condemnation of Roux, Lionne informed Colbert that a certain "Martin", Roux's valet, was very urgently sought in France by the King. In a letter of 1 July 1669, Colbert, who had not managed to persuade Martin to go to Paris, proposed to Lionne "to write to the King of England and ask him to have this man [a certain accomplice named Veyras] and ... Martin, Roux's valet, arrested and taken to Calais", which King Charles II could not refuse as Roux was acting from London.

Following this letter from Colbert, Charles II wrote a letter to his sister Henrietta of England which he did not entrust to his ordinary couriers and which disappeared in suspicious circumstances (See section "Those who died because of it"). According to Marcel Pagnol, it was with this letter that King Charles II asked his sister Henriette to announce to Louis XIV the arrest of the "valet Martin", who was later taken to Calais as suggested by the ambassador Colbert de Croissy. Yet on 13 July, Lionne informed Croissy that "after Roux's execution it is no longer necessary to bring Martin to France". According to Marcel Pagnol, this U-turn from the minister, occurring 22 days after Roux's execution, means in reality that Martin was arrested and lends weight to the theory that the King's order to kidnap Martin was entrusted to a special official, without the ambassador's knowledge. Marcel Pagnol therefore places the arrival of "Martin" (arrested in England) in Calais between 6 and 12 July 1669.

Marcel Pagnol also indicates the existence of a real valet named Martin who served Roux: he was found in London when Roux was tracked down and said he did not know anything about the plot led by his former master.

Marcel Pagnol concludes the first part of his investigation with the theory that "Roux ... admitted under torture that the leader of the plot was the twin brother of Louis XIV, who should have reigned instead of him, and that this prince, thus deprived of his rights, pretended to be his valet Martin."

=== Charles II ===
Apparently, according to the examination of de Rouvigny's letter, it is clear that the role of King Charles II of England in this conspiracy went further than only hiding it from his cousin. He is even said to have given two audiences to Roux de Marcilly, and some French provinces were promised to England after the fall of Louis XIV 308.

However, what was also revealed in this letter was that Roux regretted the lack of cooperation of England, and was reluctant to launch the first attacks on France. Marcel Pagnol explained this by the fact that a high amount of money was secretly given to Charles II by Louis XIV. Charles II might have followed the "wait and see" tactic, and waited for Spain and Switzerland to start the hostilities before launching the battle with a more favorable situation. Attacked on several fronts, French forces would have probably been defeated.

Marcel Pagnol reckons that Charles II is the one who arranged contact between the twin and the conspirator Roux: Charles II is supposed to have met the twin in early 1669 (cf previous chapter). This is how Marcel Pagnol believes James was told his true identity, and was sent to Roux who was plotting a massive conspiracy against Louis XIV, as all Charles II's government was well aware.

=== "The valet Martin" becomes "Eustache Dauger" ===
In a letter dated 26 July 1669, the minister Louvois gives the order to Captain de Vauroy, Major of the citadel of Dunkirk, to take a certain "Eustache Dauger" to the prison of Pignerol. Marcel Pagnol identifies this prisoner as the accomplice of Roux previously named "Martin", and later to be the famous prisoner in the iron mask. This is clearly a false name in order to conceal the real identity of the prisoner. Indeed, a real Eustache Dauger actually existed, as Martin, Roux de Marcilly's valet.

Following the letter from Louvois which De Vauroy received on 3 August, the prisoner Dauger arrived in Pignerol on 24 August, escorted by De Vauroy. Marcel Pagnol wonders about this delay of over twenty days, due either to the health of the prisoner, overwhelmed by his arrest, or to interrogations taking place.

Marcel Pagnol then produces the hypothesis that the King, through Louvois, proposed a deal to the prisoner: "the King would spare his life, provided that he solemnly undertook to remain silent forever; but in the interest of the State, His Majesty was obliged to deprive him of his freedom." Marcel Pagnol feels, however, that any direct meeting with Louis XIV was "very improbable".

== Eustache Dauger ==
Marcel Pagnol lists 13 "conditions" concerning the prisoner "Eustache Dauger" and enabling a correspondence to be established with the information on James de la Cloche at his disposal.

=== Eustache Dauger de Cavoye ===
Eustache Dauger de Cavoye was the brother of Louis Oger de Cavoye, who was King Louis XIV's Chief Marshall of Lodgings in 1677. Following incidents of misconduct (including the manslaughter of a 15-year-old pageboy) he was expelled from the army then interned in St-Lazare at his brother's Louis request. In a letter dated 23 January 1678 in which he implores his sister to help him, he says he has been "detained for more than ten years" and he is dying.

Marcel Pagnol deduces that in July 1669 King Louis XIV and Louvois, knowing that Eustache Dauger de Cavoye had been interned for approximately one year, gave his name (truncating it) to the man arrested and taken to Calais, who was the prisoner in the iron mask.

Marcel Pagnol states that Eustache Dauger de Cavoye died in detention in 1679, without however quoting any document proving this.

=== Transfer to Pignerol ===
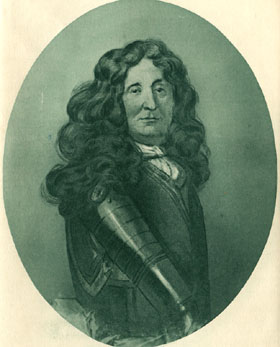
Saint-Mars, prison governor in Pignerol

In the documents at Marcel Pagnol's disposal, the name Eustache Dauger appears for the first time in the letter from Louvois dated 19 July 1669 (i.e. the day after the arrest of the valet Martin) announcing to governor Saint-Mars the due arrival of the prisoner in Pignerol and stipulating that "he is only a valet". After « Martin » the true identity of the prisoner was hidden under another name, but he was still referred to as a valet. The real Eustache Dauger, however, cannot be referred to as a valet.

Then, in his letter of 26 July 1669, Louvois orders Captain De Vauroy, Major of the citadel of Dunkirk, to take the prisoner Dauger to Pignerol. The content of the letters (and the explanatory « loose sheets » which would have accompanied it, which was a common practice at that time) suggests that Louvois also ordered Vauroy not to inform his military superior, the Count of Estrades, of the purpose of his mission, under the false pretext of the deportation of Spanish deserters. The minister Louvois himself contacted Estrades, asking him to dismiss Vauroy without specifying the nature of the "affairs" in question.

However, the Count of Estrades, who at the time was in charge of the most important maritime stronghold in the kingdom in his capacity as Governor of Dunkirk, and whom the King and Louvois fully trusted, would most certainly have been informed of Vauroy's mission had it only concerned a simple valet.

Following the death in 1674 of Champagne, one of Nicolas Fouquet's two valets, Dauger was officially made Fouquet's valet. Then following the death of Fouquet in 1680, Louvois ordered the imprisonment of Dauger and La Rivière, while announcing their release.

When the masked prisoner arrived at the Bastille, "Eustache Dauger" was therefore officially released. Du Junca, "the King's lieutenant" of the Bastille, noted on the evening of 18 September 1698 the arrival of "a former prisoner whom he [Saint-Mars] had in Pignerol, whom he always kept masked and whose name cannot be spoken […]".Marcel Pagnol concludes that after the announcement of "Dauger's" release, Saint-Mars did not use any false name or pseudonym.

=== Correspondence ===
Marcel Pagnol bases his argument on what he found in the correspondence between Saint-Mars and the Minister of War under Louis XIV—this being Louvois until 1691, then his son Barbezieux from July 1669 (date of the imprisonment in Pignerol) to 1698 (date of the transfer to Sainte-Marguerite).

It seems that Saint-Mars sent a weekly report on the state prison to the minister, who systematically replied with his instructions. Among this extensive correspondence, Pagnol mainly has at his disposal the minister's replies, collected by the Deposit Office of War and National Archives. However, Saint-Mars's letters sent to Paris (or Versailles) appear to have been significantly expurgated.

Pagnol's theory is based on the interpretation he makes of this correspondence in which he perceives lies jointly devised between the minister and Saint-Mars, so as to develop, having foreseen the possible loss of the letters or their later examination, an "official version" regarding the prisoner's identity, rather than systematically destroying the documents which would have doubtless aroused more suspicion and curiosity.

The official version of the "valet" Eustache Dauger is maintained in the correspondence until the false announcement of the release of the prisoner "Eustache Dauger". Then in 1679 Louvois is thought

== Conditions and cost of detention ==
The prisoner spent 34 years in captivity in four different prisons (Pignerol, Exilles, the island of Sainte-Marguerite, then the Bastille), in the custody of the same general staff, being Saint-Mars and his lieutenants. Even the turnkey (Antoine Rû) was with him throughout his captivity.

The financial question is one of the main elements raised by Marcel Pagnol demonstrating, in his view, the importance of the masked prisoner, and thus refuting the theories which identify this prisoner as a simple valet: Marcel Pagnol estimated the cost of 34 years of captivity at at least 5 billion Francs,^{,} bearing in mind that he estimated those of Fouquet (16 years) and Lauzun (10 years) at 1 billion.

Marcel Pagnol thus underlines the "considerations" shown to the prisoner, indicating his importance: three cells built especially for him, a very generous allowance, a certain level of luxury and exceptional treatment, including for example the permanent provision of a doctor. He was apparently granted all that he asked for.

=== Pignerol ===
Pignerol is a small town located on the slopes of the Alps, in what is now Piedmont. It was known above all for its citadel and keep, all surrounded by significant fortifications, forming a powerful fortress from where a French attack could very easily penetrate into Italy. The keep was a state prison, attached to the ministry of War, almost as famous as the Bastille, but with an even more frightening reputation. When Lauzun learned that the King had ordered his imprisonment in Pignerol, he tried to commit suicide.

The prison housed the free company of Saint-Mars, composed of 66 soldiers and a number of officers, but there were just five or six cells in the keep, where only state prisoners were held.

Saint-Mars's lieutenants were Guillaume de Formanoir (his nephew) and Blainvilliers (his first cousin). Louis de Formanoir, his second nephew, served in the cadets of the free company. De Rosarges was the ‘Major’ of the prison, the governor's assistant, and the turnkey was Antoine Rû. There were also professional valets in the prison.

The prisoners in Pignerol in the custody of Saint-Mars were: Fouquet (1664), « Eustache Dauger » (1669), Lauzun (1671), A Jacobin monk (1674), Dubreuil (1676), Count Matthioli (1679).

"He is only a valet"

In his letter to Saint-Mars on 19 July 1669 announcing the arrival of "Dauger" in Pignerol, Louvois set out instructions regarding the conditions of detention and treatment assigned to him. With reference to the furniture to be provided, he states that "he is only a valet". Marcel Pagnol regards this statement as contradictory to the content of the letter and the instructions indicative of such an important personality:

- The detention of this prisoner was a secret and was not to be revealed to anyone. Saint-Mars was to threaten him with death should he speak of "anything other than his immediate needs".
- The minister asked for the construction of a real strong room (not an underground dungeon) even though some cells were available in Pignerol. For this purpose he commissioned Poupart, colonel of the Engineers and a close assistant of Vauban.
- He ordered Saint-Mars to purchase furniture, whereas, according to Marcel Pagnol, he already had plenty to furnish the cell of a simple valet.
- Louvois suggested that, in terms of cost, the captive did not fall into the meal category of a soldier or an officer, but that he would refund "anything you [Saint-Mars] wish", and asked Saint-Mars to bring his meals to him himself.

Marcel Pagnol concludes the analysis of Louvois's letter by underlining that if a valet had known a dangerous secret, the danger he represented would not have been prolonged for thirty-four years by granting him such expensive detention conditions. He also compared some of the detention conditions with those of other prisoners such as Fouquet, Lauzun and Matthioli, who had not benefited from the construction of a new cell. Furthermore, the detention of prisoners such as Fouquet or Lauzun did not remain secret for such a long time.

American writer Julian Hawthorne also supports the identification of the Man in the iron Mask with this valet, whom he does not liken to Louis XIV's twin brother though.

Fouquet's "valet"

At the beginning of 1675, in response to Saint-Mars's repeated requests offering the prisoner "Dauger" as a valet for Lauzun then for Fouquet, Louvois authorised him to place Dauger in the service of Fouquet (who already benefited from the services of the valet La Rivière), but strictly forbade him from giving the prisoner to Lauzun.

Dauger then officially became Fouquet's valet, which supported the official claim that "he is only a valet". Louvois also continued to express his deep concern and warned Saint-Mars again regarding any encounter between Dauger and Lauzun, when Fouquet was allowed to meet Lauzun at the beginning of 1679.

According to Marcel Pagnol, Saint-Mars would actually have felt sorry for the prisoner confined in his loneliness and whose health was deteriorating. Despite Louvois's order to threaten him with death if he tried to speak to him, Saint-Mars is assumed to have listened to his story and trusted him to remain silent towards Fouquet . Marcel Pagnol goes as far as to propose that it was the prisoner himself who suggested to Saint-Mars that he adopt this approach towards Louvois.

Then, following Fouquet's death in 1680, Louvois ordered Saint-Mars to confine Dauger and La Rivière, depriving them of communication with anyone at all, while announcing their release, notably to Lauzun. This false announcement of Dauger's release supported the idea that "he is only a valet" in so far as he would be released the day after his master's death.

It was at this point, according to Marcel Pagnol, that La Rivière became the valet of "Dauger". Seeing himself thus condemned to life imprisonment alongside "Dauger" without any form of accusation or judgment, he died in Exilles on 4 January 1687.

Prisoner's health

For the rest of his life the prisoner had a doctor at his disposal: Louvois authorized Saint-Mars to call one if needed without prior authorisation.

During the first month of captivity, correspondence between Louvois and Saint-Mars testifies to the continuous and scrupulous monitoring of the prisoner's health (he was seriously ill in September 1669), reminding Marcel Pagnol of an old saying according to which "when a twin is sick, it does not take long for the other to perish".

Furthermore, Marcel Pagnol sets out an analogy between the health status of "Dauger" and Louis XIV, involving feverishness and various chronic illnesses. He bases this on reports from Saint-Mars to Louvois on the one hand, and extracts from Henri Druon's "L’Education des Princes" on the other.

=== Exilles ===
In 1681, following the death of the Duke de Lesdiguières, governor of Exilles, Louis XIV reassigned the position to Saint-Mars, who had expressed in a letter to Louvois his "extreme repugnance [with] commanding the citadel of Pignerol". Thus, in October 1681, Saint-Mars, his prisoners and his company of 45 men left Pignerol for Exilles.

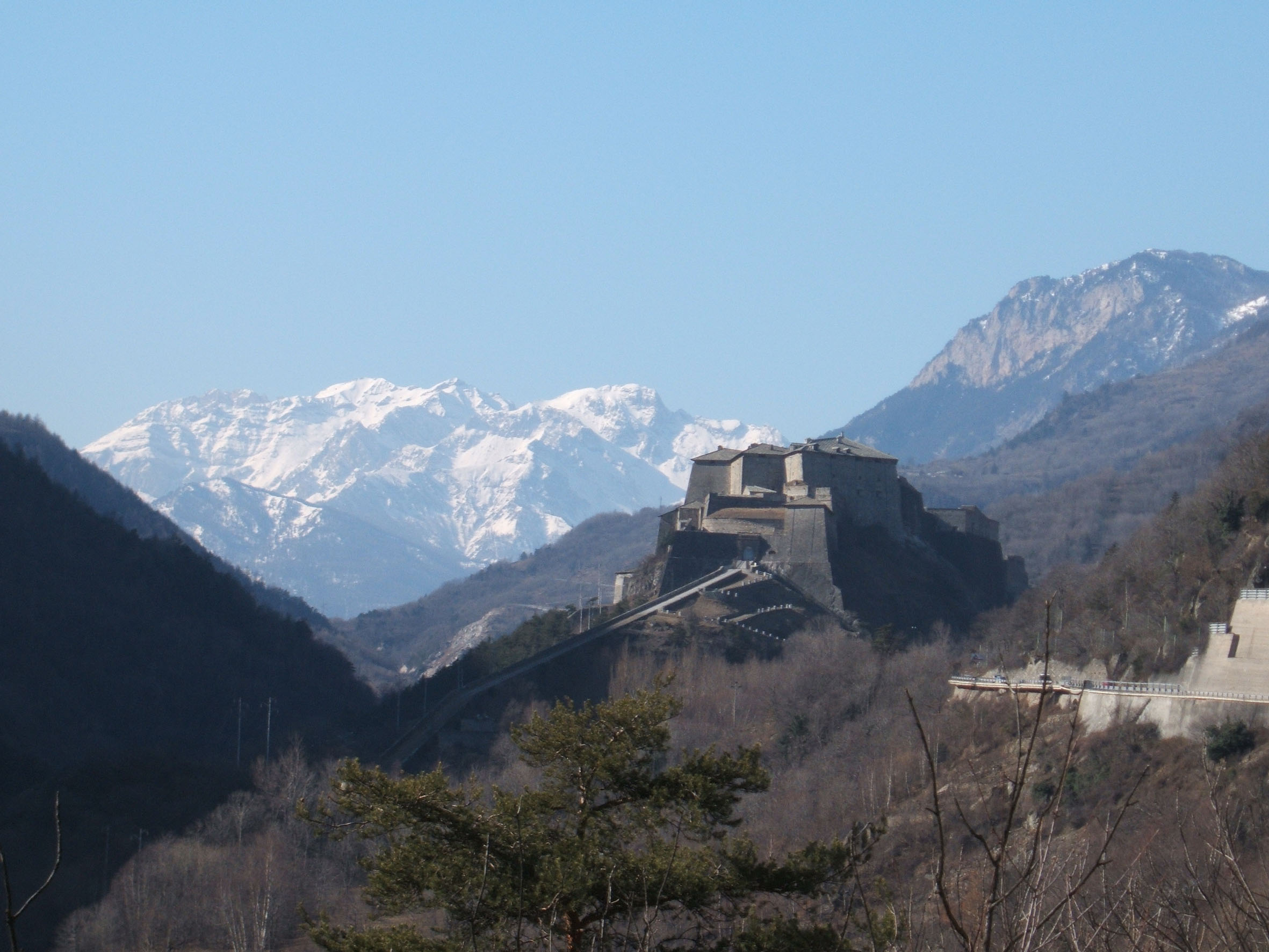
Fort of Exilles

Marcel Pagnol quotes correspondence concerning the transfer to Exilles between Louvois and Saint-Mars as well as Du Chaunoy, then war administrator in charge of army supplies and buildings. In his letters Louvois explicitly transmitted the order of His Majesty to transfer two prisoners from Pignerol described as "quite important" with Saint-Mars, without mentioning their names and calling them the "two prisoners from the lower tower". Marcel Pagnol positively identifies these two prisoners as "Dauger" and the valet La Rivière, despite the announcement of their release the day after Fouquet's death.

Saint-Mars only took two prisoners with him, Dauger and La Rivière. Matthioli and the others stayed in Pignerol. Marcel Pagnol also notes, in the correspondence between Louvois (later Barbezieux) and Saint-Mars, what he calls a "machination" in the form of a double red herring regarding the prisoner's identity: On the one hand, the official version that "he is only a valet", as when derisory expenses are mentioned; On the other hand, false information about a transfer of Matthioli with Saint-Mars to Exilles, which fuelled the widespread theory taking Matthioli to be the prisoner who would later be masked in Sainte-Marguerite then at the Bastille.

Marcel Pagnol returns again to the financial question, in particular the resources used to transfer "Dauger" and the valet La Rivière and their conditions of detention in Pignerol, the whole matter being guarded with state secrecy:

- The transfer to Exilles took place by night, in a clandestine manner, in so far as Saint-Mars did not inform Governor D’Harleville of it. The prisoners were transported in a litter.
- The fort of Exilles was not a prison. Therefore, "Dauger" and La Rivière did not appear on any prison register.
- The cell especially built in Pignerol for the prisoner "Dauger" was reproduced in Exilles, at a cost of 18 million Francs.
- The monthly allowance of the prisoner and his valet amounted to 360 livres, which at the time corresponded to 7 oxen or 1400 chickens. Furthermore, Saint-Mars benefited from an additional credit for the prisoner, details of which he does not provide.

=== Sainte-Marguerite ===
In January 1687, Louis XIV granted the governance of the Lérins Islands to Saint-Mars, the latter having complained about the toughness of the mountain climate and having reportedly fallen ill. Thus on 17 April Saint-Mars, accompanied by his free company and by "Dauger", his sole prisoner following the recent death of La Rivière, left Exilles for Sainte-Marguerite, where he arrived on 30 April.

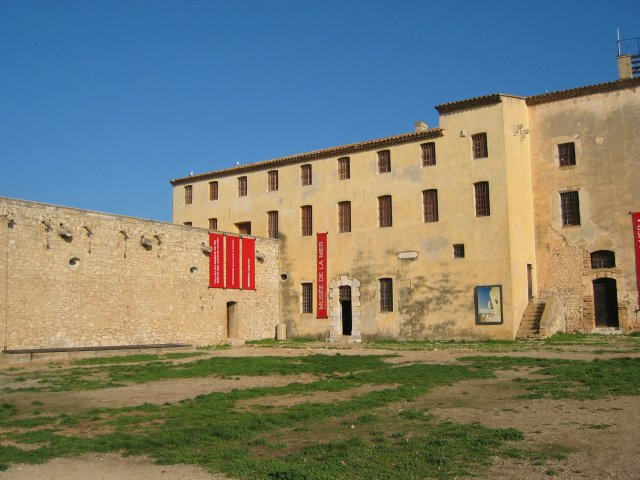
Île Sainte-Marguerite

The prisoners on Sainte-Marguerite Island in the custody of Saint-Mars were "Dauger", a knight from Chézut, five or six Protestant ministers, and later Matthioli (1694).

Quoting other correspondence between Louvois and Saint-Mars, Marcel Pagnol again notes the considerable cost of the transfer and the conditions of detention, reproducing the conditions of Exilles:

- The prisoner was transferred from Exilles to the Islands in an oilcloth litter, within which he was protected from inquisitive looks, with eight Italian carriers being brought in from Turin. Non-French-speaking Italian carriers were chosen to prevent any communication with the prisoner during the transfer;
- Saint-Mars once again had a cell built especially for Dauger, whereas the fortress of Sainte-Marguerite was an important prison already containing about ten cells; the correspondence between Louvois and Saint-Mars showed a total credit of 7200 livres, or over 21 million old francs.
- Saint-Mars came and brought the meals himself to the prisoner, accompanied by two officers, a sergeant and a turnkey, which could not be considered standard procedure in the case of a simple valet.
- All the prisoner's linen was changed twice a week, whereas in prisons the bed sheets were changed every three weeks in summer and once a month in winter.

A confession by Saint-Mars

Marcel Pagnol quotes an invaluable note from Saint-Mars to Louvois on 8 January 1688, in which he refers to a statement of expenses concerning the prisoner, specifying that he was not giving details "so that anyone who will see it shall not come to understand anything other than what they already believe." This document shows that:

- Saint-Mars was authorized to incur various expenses for this prisoner which were not included in the standard allowance, and which were refunded by the minister;
- The people "who will see [the report]", i.e. Louvois's accountants and secretaries, did not know the prisoner's identity and were supposed to believe in an official version;
- Details of the nature of Saint-Mars's expenses would provide revealing information about the prisoner's identity.

Marcel Pagnol concludes that Saint-Mars, by thus concealing details which would reveal the importance of the prisoner, betrays the establishment of the official story that "he is only a valet".

=== Bastille ===
In May 1698, minister Barbezieux offered the governance of the Bastille to Saint-Mars for an overall salary, including revenues and profits from prisoners’ food and furnishings, of 40,000 livres per year, i.e. more than 100 million Francs in 1875 (over 40 billion Francs in 1960).

After several months of hesitation, Saint-Mars accepted and left the French Riviera for France's first prison. Marcel Pagnol stresses the fact that his team followed him to Paris: Rosarges was promoted to Major of the Bastille, Guillaume de Formanoir administrator of the large prison (he shared his duties with Abbot Giraud) as well as the modest turnkey Antoine Rù, despite the fact that many turnkeys were already employed at the Bastille.

The prisoner is thought to have been accommodated in a room close to the governor's apartments.

== Fear of an Attack ==
=== Louvois's journey (to Pignerol) ===
On Saturday 3 August 1670, Louvois went to Pignerol with De Vauban, his assistant Mesgrigny and King's doctor Antoine Vallot. Marcel Pagnol emphasises the urgent nature of this ministerial journey, initially planned for 20 September, moved forward to 15 August, and finally taking place on 8 August (the journey from Paris to Briançon took five days and five nights in a mail-coach) in the delicate European context of the Treaty of Dover.

On his return to Paris on 27 August, on the orders of the King Louvois undertook complete renewal of the garrison of Pignerol, involving the replacement of the regiment, the officers (Marcel Pagnol estimates their number to be between 30 and 40) and three governors: La Bretonnière, governor of the city, St-Jacques, governor of the Citadel, and the Major of the fort of La Pérouse.

Marcel Pagnol deduces that this journey consisted of a genuine investigation into the socio-political situation in Pignerol, long conversations with the prisoner, as well as a visit to the ambassador of Turin on Sunday 10 August. As for Vauban, his mission consisted of building a strong room for the prisoner, the work only being completed in May of the following year.

Marcel Pagnol concludes that Louis XIV discovered important information about Roux de Marcilly's plot in the letters from Charles II to his sister Henrietta: Protestants may have been plotting within the garrison and preparing the prisoner's escape. Louis XIV therefore sent Louvois and Vallot to question the prisoner and undertake complete renewal of the troops on site.

=== Isolation and Surveillance ===
From the prisoner's arrival in Pignerol Marcel Pagnol refers to a fortress garrison "on the alert", due to the fears held by Louvois and Louis XIV of Swiss reprisals, Roux having been arrested in violation of border agreements. Precautions were apparently being taken against an attack by accomplices who might try to release the prisoner, until his transfer to the Bastille:

- In Pignerol: Saint-Mars, who had a company of 70 men, was authorised by the King to requisition Mr de Pienne and his garrison, i.e. 600 men and their officers. In his letters to Saint-Mars, the minister Louvois insisted on the fact that the prisoner should not speak to anyone; The transfer to Exilles took place by night. The prisoners were transported in a covered litter, surrounded by "a whole company of armed men".
- In Exilles: two men on sentry duty who stood guard day and night had to report any attempt at outside communication. Pagnol notes the potential methods of messages denounced by Saint-Mars in a letter to Barbezieux, such as "rigged" candles. According to Pagnol it was due to such messages that the prisoner was transferred to Sainte-Marguerite.
- In Sainte-Marguerite: men on sentry duty watched the sea and were ordered to shoot at any boats which came close to the coast. In 1695 Cannes was placed in a state of defence, requesting the Arsenal of Toulon. This threat probably explains the prisoner's transfer to the Bastille.
- Transfer to the Bastille: the King did not take action regarding Saint-Mars's request to have "safe" accommodation on the way to the Bastille. He preferred a more anonymous journey rather than alerting the communities along the various stops. When Saint-Mars and the prisoner stopped off in the locality of Palteau, Saint-Mars had lunch with the prisoner armed with two pistols, which seems excessive if it was only to defend himself from a revolt by the prisoner.

== The mask ==
Throughout his study, Marcel Pagnol refers to the masked prisoner by mentioning "the Mask". The mask itself is explicitly mentioned in several accounts concerning the detention in Sainte-Marguerite and then at the Bastille. In Pignerol, Marcel Pagnol shows to what extent Louvois feared an encounter with Lauzun who would have doubtless recognized him, suggesting that the prisoner did not wear a mask in Pignerol.

In The Age of Louis XIV (1751), Voltaire mentions, during the detention on the island of Sainte-Marguerite, "a mask having a chin strap with iron springs, which enabled him to eat with the mask on his face." He also mentions the mask being worn at the Bastille, including during medical examinations. In the account given by Blainvilliers (Saint Mars's lieutenant and cousin), reported by his distant cousin Formanoir du Palteau, a black mask is also mentioned during the transfer from Sainte-Marguerite to the Bastille. Marcel Pagnol finds this black mask in accounts from the Bastille: Lieutenant Du Junca, in his records reporting the arrival of the prisoner at the Bastille, along with a certain prisoner called Linguet, respectively mention "a mask of black velvet", "of velvet and not of iron".

Thus the iron mask, as depicted in the film The Man in the Iron Mask by Randall Wallace (1998), may only be a legend, a "dramatic extension" originating from the "chin strap with iron springs". Pagnol sees in this a precaution taken in order to mask a characteristic dimple visible on numerous portraits of Louis XIV.

In Sainte-Marguerite, probably because of the valet La Rivière's death, "Dauger" was authorised to go for walks on the Island. However, the fortress of Sainte-Marguerite, unlike that in Exilles, was a real prison where Dauger was likely to meet other prisoners. He was therefore required to wear a mask, to which Marcel Pagnol does not refer during the previous imprisonments in Pignerol then Exilles. Some prisoners at the Bastille, especially young noblemen, asked for the permission to wear a mask so as not to be recognized by their guards or inmates after their imprisonment. Marcel Pagnol remains convinced that the prisoner was required to wear the mask.

== Death certificate and grave ==
Marcel Pagnol reproduces the text of the death certificate on which the name Marchialy is written. The authenticity of that name has been denied by Jesuit writer Henri Griffet.

As for the grave, Marcel Pagnol mentions a rumour according to which some drugs were inserted into the prisoner's coffin to consume the body, which he does not believe. He gives more credit to other rumours stating that when the grave was opened no coffin was found.

Louis XIV, who respected the "blue blood" of the princes, probably did not have his brother buried in a communal cemetery after such a privileged prison regime. The prisoner may rest under a false name in a monastery or a royal chapel.

== Those who knew ==
=== Those who lived on ===
- Saint-Mars and his lieutenants (his cousin Blainvilliers and his two nephews Formanoir): Pagnol considers that it is to their unbroken discretion that they owed their fortune, estimated at 5 billion francs (1960 value), including three seigniorial lands, ownership of which gave them noble status. As for Major Rosarges and the turnkey Antoine Rù, their appointment at the Bastille was a remarkable crowning achievement.
- Abbot Giraud – the prisoner's confessor, appointed assistant administrator of the Bastille.
- Madame de Cavoye – Louis and Eustache Dauger de Cavoye's mother. She was granted an allowance of 6000 livres i.e. 18 million francs in 1960 by the King and her son Louis was made a marquis.
- Charles II – Louis XIV (his first cousin) secretly paid him an important allowance over a long period, without any obvious reason.
- Father Lachaise – Louis XIV's confessor: Pagnol suspects him of having encouraged Louis XIV to revoke the Edict of Nantes, given that on his death bed he placed responsibility for it on the Church, in particular the two cardinals who came to his bedside. Having been warned that he would have to answer to God about his brother's detention, the Revocation was then supposedly suggested to him, deemed useful for his religion due to the Protestant plot of 1669.

=== Those who died because of it ===
- Henrietta of France, Queen of England and Louis XIII's sister: She is thought to be the one who sent the midwife Lady Perronette to Jersey to entrust the twin to the Carteret family. She was poisoned in September 1669 shortly after Roux de Marcilly's trial and most probably the confessions of the "false Dauger" in July. Pagnol gives details of her death reported by her historiographer Cotolendi: she died while sleeping, after Vallot, the King's doctor, had urged her to take opium grains despite her reluctance.
- Henrietta of England – Charles II's sister: She is thought to have been informed of the arrest of "valet Martin", Roux de Marcilly's accomplice, by a letter from Charles II who supposedly, in addition, asked her to tell Louis XIV the news. She died brutally on 30 June 1670, the day after the Treaty of Dover that she had secretly negotiated with Charles II at Louis XIV's request. Doctor Vallot, who treated her at the last and concluded that it was a natural death after performing her autopsy, is strongly suspected of having poisoned her, according to the declarations of the Princess herself heard by Ambassador Montaigu on her deathbed. King Charles II then asked Louis XIV for all the letters he had written to his sister. Yet the correspondence published stops on 24 June 1669. Pagnol deduces from this that Louis XIV systematically destroyed all the letters after Roux de Marcilly's execution, i.e. between 80 and 100 letters.
- M^{gr} de Lionne – he died mysteriously at the age of sixty on 1 September 1671, having recorded Roux de Marcilly's confession two years earlier.
- Vallot – he died suddenly on 16 July 1673. It was probably he who interrogated the prisoner with Louvois the day after his arrest, then in Pignerol in 1670.
- Fouquet – Imprisoned in Pignerol, he is thought to have confessed at the end of 1678 that he knew the secret of the prisoner called "Dauger" who had officially been made his valet four years earlier. He was poisoned in 1680.
- La Rivière – Fouquet's valet during his imprisonment in Pignerol, he is thought to have also heard about the secret of the prisoner "Dauger". Following Fouquet's death in 1680, he was imprisoned alongside Dauger and died in Exilles in 1687 without ever having been accused or condemned.

It should also be noticed that Lauzun, who was also imprisoned in Pignerol, and to whom Fouquet could have revealed the secret of "Dauger" during secret nocturnal conversations, was "spared" and released in 1681. Pagnol is apparently uncertain of what he knew (or did not know).

Was Louvois poisoned?

In 1691, the secretary fell into disgrace, probably because he was disliked by Madame de Maintenon, Louis XIV's secret wife. He suddenly died whereas he was supposed to have been arrested and taken to the Bastille on the King's orders.

French memorialist Saint-Simon quotes the account of Cléran, his father's former equerry, who went to see Madame de Louvois before the minister's death. In Pagnol's opinion, Saint-Simon's text leaves no doubt that Louvois was poisoned by his doctor Séron on the discreet orders of the King, because of the secrets he held, concerning Fouquet's poisoning, the identity of the prisoner in the iron mask, and the death of Henrietta of France.

Louis XIV then entrusted the War Ministry to Barbezieux, Louvois's son, who was just twenty-three years old at the time.

Was Barbezieux bled to death?

Although he was popular with "many beautiful ladies" (Pagnol describes him as a womaniser), Barbezieux is denounced by Saint Simon for being immature and irresponsible, apparently too young to inherit one of the most important ministries.

Saint-Simon refers to Fagon, then chief physician to Louis XIV, who was accused of having deliberately bled Barbezieux excessively, leading to his death in 1701. Here again, according to Pagnol, the order to kill Barbezieux was implicitly given by Louis XIV.

=== Transmission of the secret ===
Louis XV

Regularly questioned by his son (the dauphin, Louis XVI's father), his minister the Duke of Choiseul, his mistress Madame de Pompadour, and his valet Mr de la Borde, Louis XV proved elusive and refused to answer. Pagnol observes, however, that his evasive responses suggest that he knew the secret. Eventually he would answer Madame de Pompadour and say he was the "secretary of an Italian Prince…" thus referring to Matthioli. Pagnol asserts that he was in fact repeating the "fable" skilfully prepared by Louvois and Barbezieux, knowing perfectly well that it was a lie, as shown by his long silence, particularly toward his own son.

Louis XVI

Questioned by Marie Antoinette, Louis XVI promised her he would carry out research. He spoke about this to a certain Mr de Maurepas, who associated with ministers who may have known the secret and asserted that "he was simply a […] subject of the Duke of Mantoue", also referring to Matthioli. According to Pagnol, Louis XVI, who knew the secret, deferred to this Mr de Maurepas, who also repeated Louvois's "fable" rather than lie to the Queen.

Marshal of Richelieu

According to Marshal Richelieu's memoirs, published by Abbot Soulavie in 1790, the daughter of Regent Philippe d’Orléans supposedly heard from her father that the prisoner was Louis XIV‘s twin-brother, the legitimate heir to the throne. These revelations were not taken seriously as Soulavie also asserts that to obtain this confidence, this girl is thought to have given favours to her father, which Pagnol disputes: Soulavie was writing during the Revolution and tried to appeal to the lower classes by denouncing the ignominy of the "tyrants" of the Monarchy. Besides, it is hard to believe the Regent was guilty of incest, he who had a great number of mistresses, and his daughter would have certainly not have prided herself on this.

Louis XVIII

Louis XVIII declared to his friend Duke de la Rochefoucauld, "I know the key to this mystery, as my successors will know it. It is our grand-father Louis XIV's honour that we must keep." Pagnol believes this declaration to be sincere, explaining that Louis XVIII was able to keep the secret of his brother Louis XVI, a year older than him, and from whom he separated in 1791.

== Witnesses ==
=== Mr Du Junca, "King's Lieutenant" at the Bastille ===
Du Junca was the second in command at the prison after the governor.

Marcel Pagnol quotes extracts from the records kept by Du Junca in which he reports the arrival at the Bastille of the prisoner brought in by Saint-Mars wearing "a black velvet mask", his death on 19 November 1703, and his burial at the cemetery of Saint-Paul the day after. The prisoner's death was registered under the name Marchiel. These records were documents meant for unofficial, personal use (as a form of reminder) and their authenticity and sincerity cannot be disputed. In any case, they constitute proof of the prisoner's existence, which is therefore not a legend.

=== Renneville ===
Pagnol quotes Constantin de Renneville, imprisoned at the Bastille in 1702, i.e. before the prisoner's death. Renneville's account in 1724 is the first public revelation concerning the unknown prisoner whom the turnkey Antoine Rû said was imprisoned for 31 years for having written poetry critical of the Jesuits, something Pagnol considers "a ridiculous invention."

It seems that the prisoner whom Renneville met was not the famous Man in the Iron Mask, based on several aspects differing from other accounts:

- Renneville gives physical descriptions without mentioning a mask: the prisoner would have been asked to turn around so as not to be recognised.
- He said he met the prisoner in 1705, whereas the famous masked prisoner died at the end of 1703.
- He describes him as being of "medium height", whereas Voltaire refers to him as "unusually tall".
- He describes his "very thick black frizzy hair", while according to Blainvilliers's account the prisoner already had completely white hair before his imprisonment at the Bastille.

The prisoner seen by Renneville could not be Count Matthioli imprisoned in 1679, i.e. 26 years of detention by 1705 rather than the 31 years mentioned. However, based on the "very thick black frizzy hair," this may be the Mooress of Moret, born of adultery between Maria Theresa of Spain (the wife of Louis XIV) and a black slave, whom Pagnol never mentions in his essay.

=== Voltaire ===
Voltaire was imprisoned at the Bastille from May 1717 to April 1718, i.e. 14 years after the masked prisoner's death, and again in 1726. Pagnol considers him to have been the main initiator of the widespread curiosity regarding the mysterious prisoner. In 1738 he wrote that he had "spoken to people who served him," making very little reference to his sources, at least in the extracts Pagnol gives in his investigation.

Le Siècle de Louis XIV (The Age of Louis XIV) (1751)

Pagnol mentions an extract in which Voltaire refers to the mysterious prisoner, imprisoned on the island of Sainte-Marguerite then at the Bastille. He describes an attractive and well-built young man wearing "a mask having a chin strap with iron springs", gives certain details testifying to a luxurious detention environment and the great respect and consideration with which he was treated by prominent citizens such as the Marquis de Louvois.

In the 2nd edition (1752), Voltaire quotes an anecdote, during imprisonment in Sainte-Marguerite, concerning a silver plate on which the prisoner is thought to have written with a knife before throwing it out of the window and which was brought back to the governor by an obliging and illiterate fisherman. Voltaire also quotes Michel de Chamillart, secretary for war in 1701 (having succeeded Barbezieux), as the last secretary to keep the secret, and whose son-in-law the Second Marshall of La Feuillade is said to have failed to make him break his oath of silence. Chamillart is said to have revealed that this was a man "who knew all the secrets of Mr Fouquet." Voltaire concludes from this that he had been kidnapped shortly after Cardinal Mazarin's death in 1661, which proved to be incorrect.

Voltaire also wonders about such detention measures and state secrecy around a simple subordinate confidant.

Questions on the Encyclopaedia

Voltaire took up his pen once again after his enemy Fréron's publications in 1768.

In the Questions sur l'Encyclopédie (1770), he declares that wearing the mask was enforced, including during medical examinations, for fear that "an overly striking resemblance […] would be recognized" and quotes the apothecary of the Bastille's account, to whom the prisoner is thought to have told his age shortly before his death, saying he was "around sixty years old". It is noticeable that the death certificate states a younger prisoner of "forty-five years old or thereabouts." Voltaire also wonders about the Italian name he was given, most probably referring to the death certificate.

The 1771 editor gives his version of the facts, which according to him is the version Voltaire could not explicitly give in his writings for fear of royal reprisals: The Queen who feared being unable to provide an heir to Louis XIII, gave birth to a first child and told the secret to Cardinal Mazarin who decided to arrange "the opportunity of a single bed for the King and the Queen," whereas they had not lived together for a long time. This hypothesis, according to which the prisoner is thought to be Louis XIV's elder brother, is not based on any proof, on the other hand Pagnol does not put forward any information that would demonstrate it is wrong.

=== The letters to Fréron ===
French journalist Elie Fréron published letters in the periodic l’Année littéraire in 1768.

Letter from Lagrange-Chancel, imprisoned on the islands of Sainte-Marguerite from 1719 to 1722

Lagrange-Chancel reports the account of Mr de Lamotte-Guérin's, governor of the Islands at the time of Lagrange-Chancel's imprisonment and lieutenant of the islands, therefore Saint-Mars's deputy, at least six years before the Prisoner's transfer to the Bastille.

Lamotte-Guérin, who therefore had access to the prison records, gives the date of the prisoner's arrest (1669). He spends time with the prisoner every day, for example when he accompanies Saint-Mars to serve the prisoner's meals, as Saint-Mars describes in a letter to Louvois in January 1696. Thirty years before the publication of Voltaire's The Age of Louis XIV, Lagrange-Chancel already refers to the consideration shown by Saint-Mars, the silver dishes and luxury clothes. The prisoner is identified as the Duke of Beaufort, who died at the Siege of Candia.

Letter from Mr du Palteau (June 1768)

Mr du Palteau was Guillaume de Formanoir's son, Saint-Mars's nephew and a cadet in the free company which will notably watch over the masked prisoner. Guillaume became a lieutenant in 1693 and most probably also accompanied Saint-Mars to serve the prisoner's meals. Pagnol describes him as "the best-informed of all witnesses."

He refers to the curiosity of his cousin Blainvilliers (Saint-Mars's first cousin) who disguises himself as a sentry in order to observe the prisoner under his bedroom window, a stopover by the prisoner in Palteau during transfer from Sainte-Marguerite to the Bastille, and farmers’ accounts of having seen the prisoner sitting at the same table as Saint-Mars in his dining room. Blainvilliers, who is thought to have seen him without his mask, describes his physical appearance as "tall and well-built," with grey hair and "nice clothes," and reports a real royal ceremonial during the visits, which Pagnol compares to that established by Henri IV at court. He then mentions a "black mask" when Saint-Mars and the prisoner stop at Palteau.

Mr du Palteau concludes by declaring: "I did not hear it said that he had a foreign accent," most probably eliminating the hypothesis of a foreigner such as Matthioli. In his letter, he does not provide any theory regarding the prisoner's identity. In June 1768, doubtless following the reactions aroused by Fréron's publications, he wrote that his account cannot "support any speculations produced until now." Pagnol explains that he might have known the prisoner's identity, since it was a family matter, but that he was sworn to secrecy because of his membership of the Royal Academy of Agriculture.

=== Other accounts ===
Princess Palatine, duchess of Orléans, the King's sister in law

In a letter sent to the Princess of Hanover in 1711, i.e. 8 years after the prisoner's death, Princess Palatine identifies him as "an English milord who had been involved in the affair of the Duke of Berwick against King William II." Pagnol explains that those in power "directed the suppositions towards some foreign lord", and he also refers to the Duke of Monmouth or Cromwell's son.

An anonymous novel

This is a tale, Mémoires secrets pour servir à l’histoire de la Perse (Confidential Memoirs Serving as a History of Persia) published in Amsterdam in 1745, using names from One Thousand and One Nights: while his death is announced, the Count of Vermandois, son of Louis XIV and the duchess Louise de La Vallière, is taken prisoner and masked by Louis XIV for having slapped the Dauphin.

Pagnol considers such a version "unacceptable" but all the same underlines the fact that the book was printed in Holland without any author's name, proving that the identity of the masked prisoner was still an important state secret in 1745, some 42 years after his death.

Linguet, imprisoned for a long time at the Bastille. His account was recorded by La Borde, Louis XV's valet:

"1. The prisoner wore a velvet mask and not an iron mask, at least during the time he spent at the Bastille.

"2. The governor himself served him and took away his laundry.

"3. When he went to mass, he was strictly forbidden to talk or show his face; the order was given to the veterans to shoot at him; […]

"4. When he died, everything was searched and burnt. […]"

The Duke of Saint-Simon, memorialist (and Lauzun's brother-in-law)

The two brothers-in-law lived in Marly in a house where they shared a certain intimacy and Saint-Simon, according to what he says, had to "extract from him [Lauzun] stories of the past," among which most probably were those about the mysterious prisoner, based on his nocturnal conversations with Fouquet in Pignerol.

At his death in 1754, Saint-Simon left a large number of manuscripts, which were not published due to an "Order of the King" to keep them secret in 1760. After full examination by two of the King's historiographers, a first edition of the Memoirs was issued in 1830. Yet according to François-Régis Bastide, who examined the very first inventory: "One hundred and sixty-two portfolios are missing, which represents a quantity of writing work fifteen times larger than the Memoirs." Pagnol concludes from this that Saint-Simon's Memoirs were expurgated on the King's order.

== Complements ==
=== Louis XIV ===
Louis XIV by Hyacinthe Rigaud (1701)

To support his theory according to which Louis XIV supposedly ordered his own brother's imprisonment for life, harshening the sentence by making him wear a mask, Pagnol recounts several anecdotes from the childhood, reign and personal life of the "Sun King", revealing a vain, cruel and deceitful side, going so far as to suggest several orders to murder certain figures by poisoning them (in particular the minister Louvois, see section "Those who knew"). Finally he denounces the revocation of the Edict of Nantes as being his "main crime".

A marked childhood

Drawing on a book by Philippe Erlanger, Pagnol cites some premonitory anecdotes: examples of unreasonable and premature praise (under five years old), a night in small camp beds in St-Germain during the Fronde; the people besieging the royal palace and "dissidents" approaching the little king's bed to make sure of his presence, but who give rise to lingering grudges.

Pagnol then quotes stories extracted from the Memoirs of Saint-Simon, depicting the King in all his deceit.

The forbidden marriage of Mademoiselle and Lauzun

Mademoiselle, Louis XIV's first cousin, possessed considerable properties, in particular the principality of Dombes and the comté of Eu. After having declared that he would not oppose her marriage to the Duke of Lauzun, the King had it cancelled the day before the ceremony planned for 18 December 1670. He then had Lauzun imprisoned in Pignerol (where he stayed for ten years) in order to exchange his freedom against the principality of Dombes and the comté of Eu, which he bequeathed to the Duke of Maine, his illegitimate son from his affair with Madame de Montespan.

Once released, Lauzun is forced to stay in the provinces, under the custody of a captain of the musketeers, and the King still forbids his marriage.

Philippe d’Orléans

Louis XIV also betrayed his nephew Philippe d’Orléans by disinheriting him and by designating the Duke of Maine as regent of the Kingdom. He informed him of this as he was lying on his deathbed, after the last rites, indulging in speeches and outbursts of great hypocrisy.

"Monsieur" Philippe d'Orléans – his younger brother

Louis XIV also took sanctions against his brother Monsieur when he commanded the victorious army of William of Orange at the Battle of Cassel in 1677. Jealous of this remarkable success, Louis XIV gave him no further commanding role.

"Disaster" of Fargues

During a major hunting trip near Dourdan, the Count of Guiche, the Count of Lude, Vardes, the Duke of Lauzun (who recounted the adventure to Saint-Simon) and other courtiers got lost in the forest after the King had returned. They asked then for hospitality at the house of a certain Fargues, who warmly welcomed them, offering an excellent meal and rooms for the night. But Fargues, who at the time of the Paris Revolt incurred the wrath of the Court and in particular of Cardinal Mazarin, had chosen to discreetly withdraw and be forgotten.

Following the hunting adventure, the King and the Queen, furious to learn that Fargues was living quietly so close to Paris, asked Lamoignon, first President of the Parliament of Paris, to investigate his past. Lamoignon found a way to implicate Fargues in a murder committed during a period of troubles, on which ground Fargues was arrested and executed despite the protection of amnesty.

The revocation of the Edict of Nantes

The Edict of Nantes, an edict of tolerance promulgated in April 1598 by King Henry IV of France which put an end to religious wars by granting certain rights to Protestants, was revoked by Louis XIV in October 1685. Pagnol denounces this as the "main crime" committed by Louis XIV, and the catalyst for a real civil war in France involving huge "massacres".

Indeed, Louis XIV would later realise this. On his deathbed, anxious to escape Catholic hell, he turned to Cardinals de Rohan and de Bissy, holding them responsible for everything.

Posterity, laudatory slogans

If they wished to protect their professional survival, writers, poets and authors of that time had no choice but to win the King's favour. According to Pagnol, it was thus flattery from figures such as Boileau, Molière etc. which ensured Louis XIV's posthumous glory. He was assigned the name of "Louis le Grand" by an assembly of prominent figures at his own orders, rather than elevated by History for the greatness of his reign.

=== Count Matthioli ===
Ercole Antonio Matthioli, was born in Bologna in 1640, and was appointed deputy to the Duke of Mantoue (in present Lombardy) which made him a count, a title that Marcel Pagnol describes as "not very serious".

In 1678, the Duke of Mantoue secretly asked Matthioli to negotiate the sale of the stronghold of Casal with Louis XIV (in what is now Piedmont), a real strategic point close to the French border, explaining why he was generously rewarded by Louis XIV.

However, he revealed the secret at the Court of Turin, which then spreads as far as Spain. The treaty is therefore not ratified. Louis XIV, feeling deceived and ridiculed, had him kidnapped and imprisoned in Pignerol in May 1679, then on the Islands of Sainte-Marguerite, where he died in 1694, most probably of exhaustion caused by the walk from Pignerol to the Islands, about a hundred kilometres.

The "Matthiolist" theories

Pagnol quotes certain theories identifying the masked prisoner as Count Matthioli, such as those of Marius Topin, or the historian Funck Brentano, particularly due to the name Marchialy written on the death certificate, which could be a distortion of "Matthioli". Pagnol rejects this theory using several arguments:

- The dungeon: it was in 1669 that the first dungeon of the masked prisoner was built in Pignerol, yet Matthioli was imprisoned only ten years later. Being locked in the same dungeon as a Jacobin monk, he therefore does not hold any dangerous secret.
- The time of captivity: in a letter written in 1691, Barbezieux refers to "the masked prisoner that you [Saint-Mars] have kept for twenty years" (more precisely 22 years – since 1669). Yet Saint-Mars had at the time kept Matthioli for only two and a half years in Pignerol, since his imprisonment in May 1679. Matthioli stayed in Pignerol after Saint-Mars's departure to Exiles in October 1681.
- The prisoner's transportation: the prisoner was transferred to Exiles on the Islands of Sainte-Marguerite in an oilcloth litter, a means of transport which was not deployed for Matthioli. He walked from Pignerol to the Islands while sick, and seemingly died of exhaustion on his arrival in the Islands.
- Furthermore, Italians were chosen to carry the oilcloth litter which covered the prisoner. Yet according to Pagnol, carriers who did not speak the prisoner's language were chosen to prevent him from making revelations, which indicates that the prisoner was not Italian.
- Finally, Pagnol thinks it unlikely that the prisoner would be identified by his name (corrupted as Marchialy) on the death certificate after his identity had been kept secret for 34 years.
