= Yves d'Alègre =

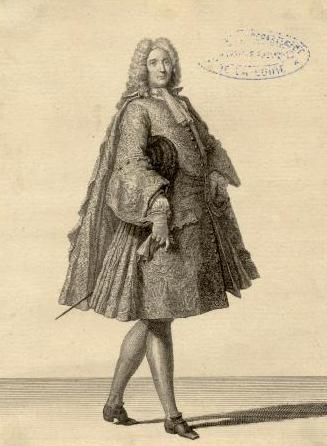
Yves d'Alègre, marquis of Tourzel

Yves d'Alègre (1653 – 3 March 1733). He was the fifth head of the Alègre family, and marquis of Tourzel as well as seigneur of Montaigu, of Saint-Flour-le-Châtel, of Aurouze and of Aubusson and count of Flaugeac.

== Life ==
He was a son of Emmanuel, Marquis of Alègre and Marie de Raimond de Modène, daughter of the Grand Provost of France.

He fought in all Louis XIV's wars — the Franco-Dutch War, the Nine Years' War, the War of the Spanish Succession. He became Colonel of the Royal Dragoon Regiment from May 1679 to April 1693 and took part in the sieges of Limbourg, Condé, Valenciennes, Cambrai, Luxembourg and the Battles of Fleurus (1690) and Steenkerque (1692), where he was wounded in the arm by a musket shot. In March 1693 he was appointed Maréchal de camp and promoted Lieutenant-General in January 1702.

He participated in the Assault on Nijmegen (1702) and the Defense of Bonn (1703), where he had to capitulate after holding the city for 3 weeks. He was captured on 18 July 1705 during the Battle of Elixheim, but freed on parole as a secret negotiator. After his negotiations failed, he was reimprisoned. In 1712 he was freed and the same year took part in the capture of Douai on 8 September, the siege of Quesnoy on 4 October and the Siege of Bouchain on 11 October.

In 1706 he was appointed Governor of Saint-Omer, rising to Lieutenant-General of the Languedoc in 1707, then Governor of Metz in 1723; he was further promoted Marshal of France in 1724. Already a Knight of Malta, King Louis XV appointed him a Chevalier of the Order du Saint-Esprit in 1728.

== Marriage and issue ==
On 29 August 1679 he married Jeanne (1658-1723), daughter of Jean de Giraud, lord of Donneville. They had five children:

- Yves-Emmanuel (1685-1705) Count of Alègre and of Millau
- Marie-Thérèse (1680–1706) married (1696) Louis François Marie Le Tellier, marquis of Barbezieux, son of Michel marquis de Louvois
- Marie-Marguerite (1688-1752) married (1705) Philippe de Recourt, count of Rupelmonde (various factums published in 1727 refer to him as Joseph de Boulogne de Licques, count of Rupelmonde)
- Marie-Emmanuelle married (1713) Jean-Baptiste Desmarets, marquis of Maillebois, Marshal of France
- Emmanuel, died young
- Marguerite-Thérèse (b. 1700 & d. young)

After the death of Marquise Jeanne, his first wife, he married secondly Madeleine d'Ancezune on 21 August 1724.
