= Rouffignac-de-Sigoulès =

- Commune
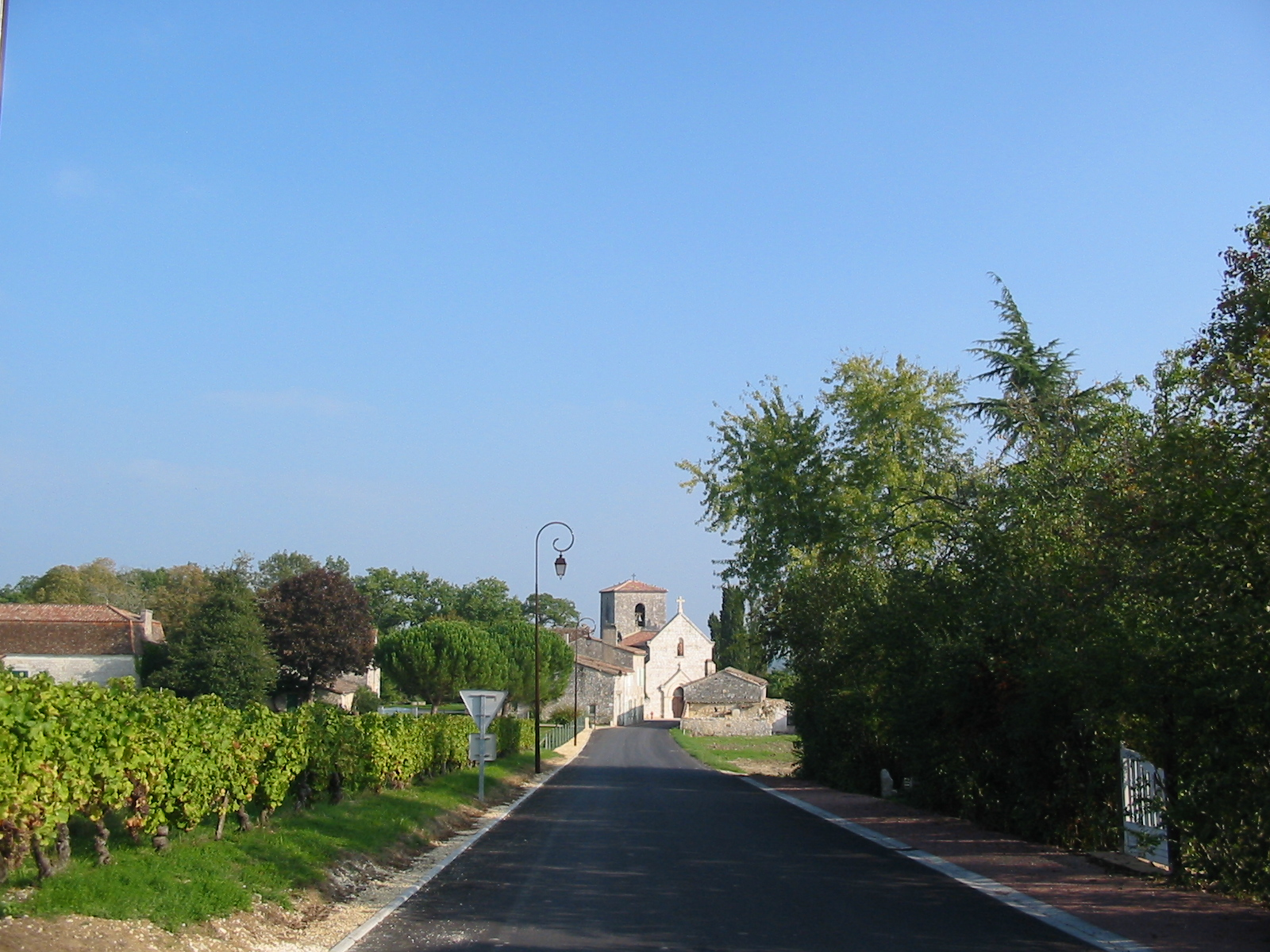
- The village of Rouffignac-de-Sigoulès

- Coat of arms
- Location of Rouffignac-de-Sigoulès
- Location within France Location within Nouvelle-Aquitaine
- Coordinates: 44°47′02″N 0°26′57″E
- Country: France
- Region: Nouvelle-Aquitaine
- Department: Dordogne
- Arrondissement: Bergerac
- Canton: Sud-Bergeracois
- Intercommunality: CA Bergeracoise

Government
  - Mayor (2020–2026): Alain Castang
- Area^{1}: 6.52 km^{2} (2.52 sq mi)
- Elevation: 132 m (433 ft)
- Highest elevation: 163 m (535 ft)
- Lowest elevation: 62 m (203 ft)
- Population (2023): 332
  - Density: 50.9/km^{2} (132/sq mi)
- Time zone: UTC+01:00 (CET)
  - Summer (DST): UTC+02:00 (CEST)
- INSEE/Postal code: 24357 /24240
- ^{1} French Land Register data, which excludes lakes, ponds, glaciers > 1 km^{2} (0.386 sq mi or 247 acres) and river estuaries.

Rouffignac-de-Sigoulès (French pronunciation: [ʁufiɲak də siɡulɛs], literally Rouffignac of Sigoulès; Occitan: Rofinhac del Sigolés) is a commune in the Dordogne department in Nouvelle-Aquitaine in southwestern France.

== Population ==
Historical population
Year	Pop.	±% p.a.
1968	253	—
1975	263	+0.56%
1982	281	+0.95%
1990	282	+0.04%
1999	284	+0.08%
2007	344	+2.42%
2012	346	+0.12%
2017	311	−2.11%
2023	332	+1.09%
Source: INSEE

== See also ==
- Communes of the Dordogne department
