= Sigoulès-et-Flaugeac =

- Commune
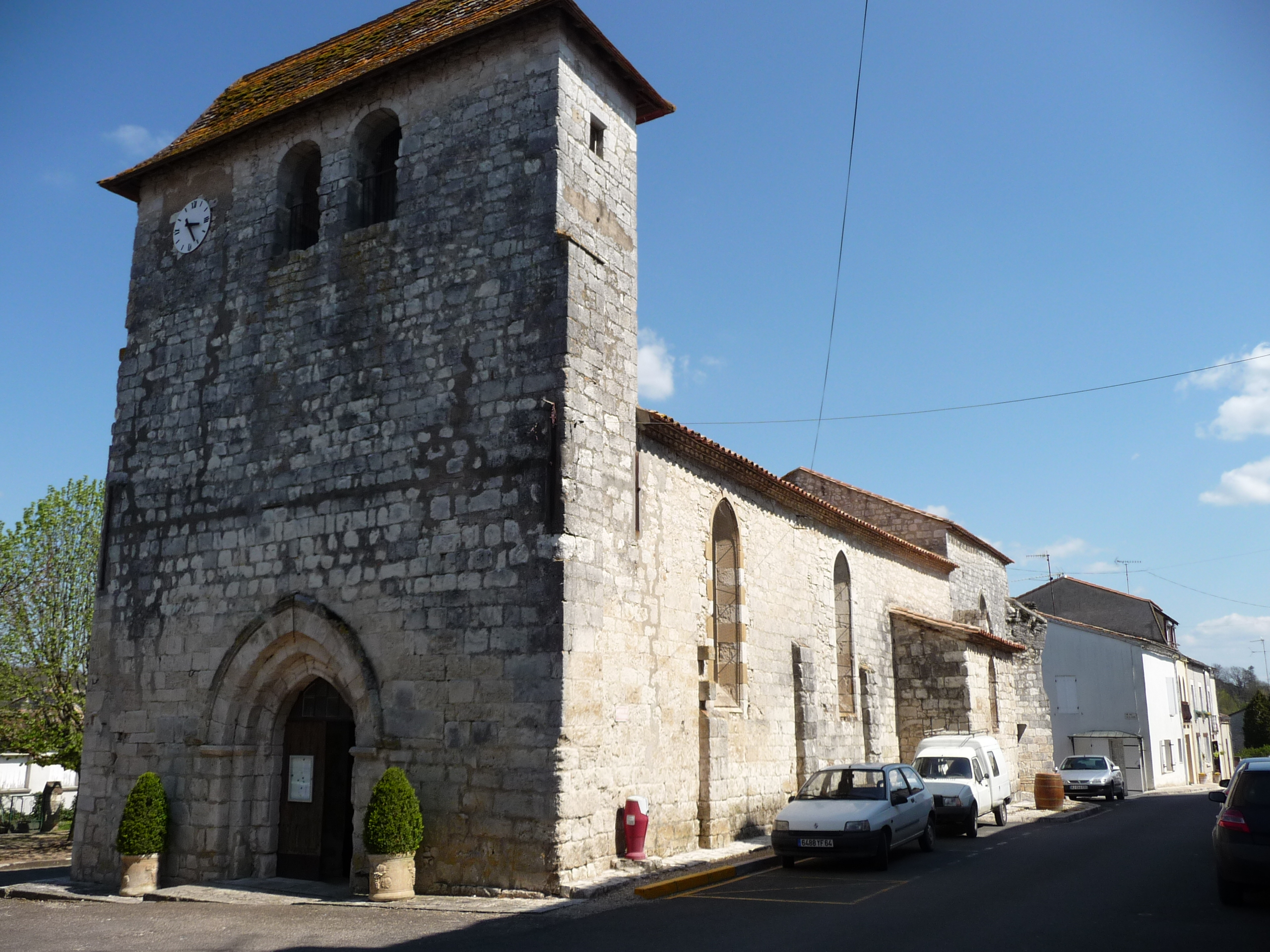
- Church of Sigoulès
- Location of Sigoulès-et-Flaugeac
- Location within France Location within Nouvelle-Aquitaine
- Coordinates: 44°45′35″N 0°24′40″E
- Country: France
- Region: Nouvelle-Aquitaine
- Department: Dordogne
- Arrondissement: Bergerac
- Canton: Sud-Bergeracois
- Intercommunality: CA Bergeracoise

Government
  - Mayor (2020–2026): Jean-Louis Dessalles
- Area^{1}: 18.21 km^{2} (7.03 sq mi)
- Highest elevation: 186 m (610 ft)
- Lowest elevation: 51 m (167 ft)
- Population (2023): 1,280
  - Density: 70.3/km^{2} (182/sq mi)
- Time zone: UTC+01:00 (CET)
  - Summer (DST): UTC+02:00 (CEST)
- INSEE/Postal code: 24534 /24240
- ^{1} French Land Register data, which excludes lakes, ponds, glaciers > 1 km^{2} (0.386 sq mi or 247 acres) and river estuaries.

Sigoulès-et-Flaugeac (French pronunciation: [siɡulɛs e floʒak]; Occitan: Lo Sigolés e Flaujac) is a commune in the Dordogne department in Nouvelle-Aquitaine in southwestern France. It was established on 1 January 2019 by merger of the former communes of Sigoulès (the seat) and Flaugeac.

== See also ==
- Communes of the Dordogne department
