= Roux de Marcilly =

Alleged plotter against French king, died 1669

Paul Roux de Marcilly, sometimes spelled Marsilly (born in Nîmes around 1623; died in Paris on 22 June 1669), is said to be the head and coordinator of a plot against King of France Louis XIV in 1668. In a socio-political context of persecution of Huguenots and famine, the plot was on a European scale. The conspiracy aimed at overturning Louis XIV’s government and change into republics provinces like Provence, Dauphiné, and Languedoc, with the military support of Switzerland, Spain and United Netherlands.

While living in London, Roux de Marcilly was betrayed, denounced in May 1668, illegally kidnapped in Switzerland and jailed, before he was condemned to death by "breaking on the wheel" in Paris on 21 June 1669, after being assisted by minister Jean Daillé.

In his historical essay Le Masque de Fer (The Iron Mask) released in 1965, French novelist Marcel Pagnol identified the famous masked prisoner (known as “The Man in the Iron Mask”) as Louis XIV’s twin brother who was born after him, and thus legitimate heir of the crown. This twin, identified with James de la Cloche in his youth, was said to have been sentenced to life imprisonment after he conspired against his brother with Roux. Coveting his brothers’ crown, he is likely to be a major figure of the conspiracy.

== Denunciation and sentence of the conspirator ==
In London, at the start of May 1668, Sir Samuel Morland, a diplomat and ancient member of the Parliament, earned the trust of Roux de Marcilly. Morland denounced the “conspirator” to M. de Rouvigny, ambassador extraordinary of France in London. Skeptical at first, Ruvigny soon decided to arrange a dinner in the honour of Roux, aiming to hear his plans: During this dinner, Morland asked Roux a series of questions prepared in advance by M. de Ruvigny who, hidden in a cabinet, wrote down all the answers.

Straight after, M. de Ruvigny sent a long letter to King Louis XIV, giving all the details to denounce Roux, his accomplices, contacts and current moves. He even mentioned about a possible attack against the king when saying, when describing Roux, that "that embodied devil says a good blow will put everyone at rest".

However, this letter provided little information on the identity of Roux de Marcilly and his occupations in London, only briefly referring to a military past. M. de Ruvigny also denounced an accomplice called Balthazar based in Geneva, and named the Marquis of Castelo Rodrigo in Spain, King of England Charles II (first cousin of Louis XIV) and his brother the Duke of York as being well aware of the plot and linked with Roux.

In spite of his long meetings with the Duke of York and State Secretary Md Arlington, Roux said he was disappointed by the lack of cooperation of England, reluctant to launch the first attacks on France. On the other hand, Roux was much more confident about the massive support of Spain and Switzerland. Marcel Pagnol reckons that Roux’s plan had very good chances of success, because of the socio-political context of persecution of Protestants and famine.

After Ruvigny’s report, Roux, who had been warned of the danger, fled to Switzerland where he took refuge with his friend Balthazar at the end of February 1669. In defiance of the Swiss sovereignty, Louis XIV had him kidnapped. On 19 May 1669 (almost one year after the letter that denounced him), Roux was made prisoner and sent to the Bastille, where the Secretary of State for Foreign Affairs Mgr de Lionne questions him under torture. Louis XIV had his trial sped up to only two days, and Roux de Marcilly was executed by "breaking on the wheel" in public in Paris on 21 June 1669. Roux was said to have been gagged for his execution.

=== Martin the valet ===
Active research went on in the days following the execution of Roux de Marcilly, much likely due to avowals and revelations he gave away while being tortured. The correspondence between minister Lionne and Colbert de Croissy quoted a certain "Martin", Roux’s valet, as one of the accomplices.

According to Pagnol, who gives a very personal interpretation of the correspondence – amongst which a letter from Charles II to his sister Henrietta of England – "Martin the valet" was arrested in England and handed over to the French in Calais in early July 1669.

Pagnol traced, still through the interpretation of some correspondence, his conveying to Pinerolo, where he was jailed under the identity of Eustache Dauger, another fake name (but again of someone who did exist) in order to hide his true identity. Later, after being transferred to Sainte Marguerite Island and to the Bastille, he was condemned to wear a mask (See Man in the Iron Mask).

=== Alleged involvement of Charles II ===
Apparently, according to the examination of M. de Ruvigny’s letter, the role of King Charles II of England in this conspiracy went further than only hiding it from his cousin. He is even said to have given two audiences to Roux de Marcilly, and some French provinces were promised to England after the fall of Louis XIV.

However, what was also revealed in this letter was that Roux regretted the lack of cooperation of England, reluctant to launch the first attacks on France. Pagnol explained this by the fact that a high amount of money was secretly given to Charles II by Louis XIV. Charles II might have followed the "wait and see" tactic, and waited for Spain and Switzerland to start the hostilities before launching the battle with a more favorable situation. Attacked on several fronts, French forces would have probably been defeated.

Charles II is supposed to be the one who arranged contact between the twin and the conspirator Roux, after revealing to the twin his filiation and identity, while he was named James de la Cloche.

During the Marcilly trial, Charles II summoned Ambassador Colbert de Croissy in order to have him transmit to Louis XIV his regrets for he had not had "the slightest knowledge of the pernicious aims of this villainous [Roux]" on the lands of his kingdom.

== Sources and further reading ==
- Jacques Basnage de Beauval, Annales des Provinces-Unies : Contenant les choses les plus remarquables arrive'es en Europe, et dans les autres parties du monde, depuis la paix d'Aix-la-Chapelle, jusqu'à celle de Nimègue, vol.2, p. 77-78, éd. Charles Le Vier, La Haye, 1726
- François Nicolas Napoléon Ravaisson-Mollien, Louis Jean Félix Ravaisson-Mollien, Archives de la Bastille : 1681, 1665-1674, vol.7, p. 305 à 332, éd. A. Durand et Pedone-Lauriel, 1874.
- Émile Laloy, Masque de fer : Jacques Stuart de la Cloche, l'abbé Prignani; Roux de Marsilly, Paris, Le Soudier, 1913, p. 209-293
- John Viénot, Histoire de la Réforme française de l’Édit de Nantes à sa Révocation, Paris, Librairie Fischbacher, 1934, p. 420-425
- Marcel Pagnol - Le Masque de fer, éditions de Provence (remanié sous le titre Le Secret du Masque de fer en 1973), essai historique, Monte-Carlo, Pastorelly
- (in French) E. Haag, La France protestante : ou Vies des protestants français qui se sont fait un nom dans l’histoire depuis les premiers temps de la réformation jusqu’à la reconnaissance du principe de la liberté des cultes par l’Assemblée nationale
- Aimé-Daniel Rabinel, La tragique aventure de Roux de Marcilly, Édouard Privat, 1969
- « Marsilly : comploteur réduit au silence », La France pittoresque, n° 33
- (in German) Nikolaus Pfander, Chronologia Sardani : Roux de Marcilly, éd. Nikolaus Pfander, 2005, ISBN 1411635086
- Andrew Lang - The Valet's Tragedy (1903)
