= James de la Cloche =

Supposed illegitimate son of Charles II of England (1644–1669)

James de la Cloche (1644–1669; unattested dates) is an alleged would-be-illegitimate son of Charles II of England who would have first joined a Jesuit seminary and then given up his habit to marry a Neapolitan woman. His existence has not been proven, and the parentage with Charles II is unlikely if 1644 is his correct birth date, since the king was only 14 years old then. James de la Cloche is mainly known through studies of British historian Lord Acton.

Arthur Barnes in 1908, and Marcel Pagnol in 1973, developed an identification of the famous Man in the Iron Mask with James de La Cloche. In his historical essay Le Secret du Masque de fer (The secret of the Iron Mask) released in 1973, Marcel Pagnol summarizes and comments various theories of historians. Besides Lord Acton and Mgr Barnes, M. Pagnol also refers to the historian John Lingard, Andrew Lang, Edith Carey, and also the French historian Laloy.

== Lord Acton's Research ==
In 1862, Lord Acton received copies of the so-called Gesu manuscript from Giuseppe Boero of the Jesuit archives in Rome. Lord Acton later wrote an article The Secret History of Charles II.

Based on the documents, Charles II would have had an illegitimate son with lady Marguerite de Carteret when he had been in Jersey in 1646. The official father was Marguerite's husband, Jean de la Cloche. The son would have received Protestant education in France and the Netherlands and used the name James de la Cloche du Bourg. Charles II would have recognized him in secret in 1665 and granted him an annuity of £500 as long as he would stay in London and as an Anglican. Apparently de la Cloche spoke mainly French.

Jacobus de la Cloche entered a Jesuit seminary in Rome 2 April 1668. He was wearing common clothes and claimed that he was 24 years old. De la Cloche had converted to Catholicism in Hamburg in 1667. He had received a written proof of his ancestry from Queen Christina of Sweden and now wanted to join the seminary. He was accepted and entered St. Andrea al Quirinale as a novice on 11 April.

Apparently, King Charles was not angry that de la Cloche had switched faiths. In 1668, Oliva, the general of the Jesuits, received a letter in which the king told that he planned to convert to Catholicism. He could not contact any of the local Catholic priests without arousing suspicions but his son, one de la Cloche, would be a perfect choice. He could arrange a cardinal's position for him, if he would not be suitable for the throne. In August, the next letter invited de la Cloche to come home, without speaking to queen Christina, who was coming to Rome. The king had arranged him to travel under the name Henri de Rohan. By October, de la Cloche was on his way.

The next royal letter, dated 18 November 1668, says that Charles II had sent his son back to Rome to act as his unofficial ambassador to the Holy See and he would later return to London when he had received answers to questions the king was willing to deliver only orally. He had asked Oliva to give de la Cloche 800 doppies for expenses. After that, there is no mention of de la Cloche.

=== Prince "Stuardo" ===
However, in 1669, a James Stuart, or Don Giacopo Stuardo, appears in Naples and on 19 February, marries a Donna Theresa Corona, daughter of, Signor Francesco Corona, and Lady Anuccia de Anicis of the Orisini branch, in the chapel of S. Aspremo in the cathedral of Naples. She received a dowry of 200 doppies. However, when Jacopo is heard to talking of his high birth and seen to live extravagantly, the suspicions of the viceroy of Naples are raised. He orders Stuart's arrest and imprisonment in San Elmo castle, before he eventually he is transferred to the castle of Gaetà. Theresa is shut up in a monastery. The English consul Browne, is summonsed and reports that this Jacopo can 'give no account of the birth he pretends to,' despite his claim to be a natural son of Charles II (although it is unclear when this was said).

The English offered no substantiation of the claims, and he had no documents to verify them, so he was removed from the relative comfort of the castle of Gaeta to the lowly prison of Vicaria. He was sentenced to flogging but his in-laws managed to stop that.

Stuart was eventually released, left supposedly for England and returned with more money. By 31 August he was dead. In his confusing will he had asked Charles II to give his unborn child an "ordinary principality" or something equally appropriate. He also named Henrietta Maria Stuart (Charles II's sister) as his mother. The matter was mentioned in contemporary newsletters and English consul's messages to England.

Stuart's widow gave birth to a son, Giacomo Stuardo. The son married Lucia Minelli di Riccia in 1711 and later regained some of his father's inheritance. The last record of him is from 1752.

Various historians have had conflicting opinions about the matter. James de la Cloche might have forged the royal letters himself. The confusing will may have been the handiwork of the Corona family. There might have been two separate men claiming the same ancestry - the change would have been rather drastic. Lord Acton and Father Boero assumed that the second man was an impostor. Boero assumed that de la Cloche had returned to London using yet another name and James Stuart had adopted his claim. Lord Acton suggests that Stuart might have been a servant who had robbed de la Cloche to get his money and papers.

== John Lingard ==
The historian John Lingard, who procured the letters of Charles II to James and Father Oliva, affirmed that they all are fakes, making James an imposter prince. The letters addressed to King Charles II evoke Queen Henrietta Maria as being in London in 1668, when she went to settle in France three years before, where she remained until her death in 1669. M. Pagnol then cited other evidence put forward by John Lingard identifying one of the letters as a fake: "On the other hand, one of the King’s certificates is dated from White Hall while the King, because of the plague in London, had taken refuge in Oxford with all his court".

Whitehall does not appear in what M. Pagnol transcribed of the certificate. The letter of 18 November 1668, by which Charles II sent a debt of gratitude to Father Oliva, is dated from Whitehall. However, according to the article Charles II of England referring to the book Charles II (London, Weidenfeld and Nicolson, 1991) by John Miller, the royal family left London in July 1665 for Salisbury, while Parliament met in Oxford. The King returned to London in February 1666, he could therefore have drafted a letter to White Hall in late 1668.

== Edith Carey ==
Carey was convinced that James is really the son of Charles II and Marguerite Carteret. He would have been ordained a priest in Rome before returning to London in order to catechize (convert) in father. He vanished after the letter from Charles II to Oliva, dated 18 November 1668. According to her, Charles II had Louis XIV arrange the arrest of this embarrassing bastard son in France (in July 1669) and then his incarceration in Pinerolo, which gives the identification with the Man in the Iron Mask, being then cousin of Louis XIV as the son of his first cousin. The Prince Stuardo would then have been made up by Charles II in order to explain James’ disappearance.

Charles II would then have got rid of his bastard son, a few month only after requesting his return to London, in order to appeal to his new priest status to be catechized. Marcel Pagnol disagrees with this theory, arguing that Charles II, who made other bastard sons dukes, would certainly not have had James life-imprisoned after having recognised him.

== Andrew Lang ==
According to Lang, if James de la Cloche had been of royal blood and had acquired deep religious creeds, he would not have married a commoner or displayed his money. Lang made up his mind to demonize James, considering him as a "bold crook" who screwed Father Oliva for the sole purpose of getting money out of him. This is what Marcel Pagnol retrieves in the Jersey's dictionary: James was not the king's bastard son, but a megalomaniac crook, who died in Naples in on 10 September 1669.

== Arthur S. Barnes ==
In his book The Man of the Mask (1908), Mgr Barnes claims James was really the illegitimate son of Charles II. According to him he returned to London under the name of Father Pregnani to catechise his father before returning to France. Because he held the secret of the Treaty of Dover, he was arrested and taken to Pinerolo under the name "Eustache Dauger." This theory was examined again by the French historian Mr Laloy. Father Pregnani returned from London to Paris in early July 1669, but according to the Memoirs of Primi Visconti, he died in Rome in 1679.

== Marcel Pagnol ==
In the historical essay Le Masque de fer (The Iron Mask) released in 1965, Marcel Pagnol develops a theory identifying the famous prisoner in the Iron Mask as the elder twin brother of Louis XIV, who was born after him (meaning the older brother, born before Louis, was the legitimate heir to the throne). Marcel Pagnol completed his essay in 1973, re-titling it Le Secret du Masque de fer (The Secret of the Iron Mask), adding in particular the result of his research on James de la Cloche, whom he identified as the twin brother of Louis XIV, bearing that name in his youth.

=== Growing up on the Island of Jersey ===
M. Pagnol could not find any birth certificate, baptismal death certificate in the Jersey archives. He therefore concluded that James was not born on the island, and that he did not belong to the Carteret family.

In 1644, Louis XIV was 6 years old. Cardinal Mazarin sent the midwife Lady Perronette to England where Queen Henrietta of France, sister of Louis XIII and wife of the English king Charles I, gave birth to Henrietta of England. According to M. Pagnol, the midwife brought the twin with her to hide him abroad, which was the actual purpose of her journey. After giving birth, Henrietta of France sent Lady Perronette to the Carterets, the noblest family on the island of Jersey, so their daughter Marguerite could raise the child. Perronette paid them a large dowry for the adoption but did not reveal his true identity, presenting him as the son of a young noblewoman. It was to the same Carteret family that Henrietta of England sent her son (the future Charles II) at the age of 15 years, in 1646, during the English Civil War of 1642–1651.

In 1657, Marguerite married Jean de la Cloche, who gave his name to James. In Jersey, a rumour spread that James was born of a liaison between Marguerite Carteret and the future King Charles II, who came to the island in his youth. James questioned Marguerite, who denied the rumour. Later, finding a striking resemblance between himself and Charles II when seeing his portrait, he was convinced of being the King's son and wished to be legally recognised, like two other illegitimate sons. Marguerite (or probably her father) approached the King on his behalf, but the latter did not acknowledge him.

=== Jesuit in Rome ===
Considering himself unjustly repudiated by the person he believed to be his father, James did not give up just yet. Knowing via the Carteret family that Charles II was secretly preparing to convert to Catholicism (and would thus subject the English Church to the authority of the Pope), he decided to become a Catholic priest in order to be able to convert Charles II. Besides the certificate from the Queen of Sweden James applied for his candidacy at the Institute of Jesuit novices with a first certificate from Charles II himself, recognising him as his son the "Prince Stuart". In other letters, Charles II promised the throne to James and a generous reward to the Jesuits.

In a letter dated 18 November 1668 (presumably the one cited by Lord Acton), Father Oliva received a debt of gratitude, promising him the sum of 20,000 pounds sterling, and then asked for a payment to James of 800 pounds that he undertook to reimburse to him. According to M. Pagnol, Oliva certainly paid that sum to James, believing the authenticity of the letters and royal guarantees. M. Pagnol therefore placed the departure from Rome at the beginning of December 1668, a few weeks later than the date given by Lord Acton.

Comparing the letters from Charles II to Father Oliva with other letters addressed to his sister Henrietta of England, two expert graphologists consulted by M. Pagnol are positive: the letters sent to Father Oliva are fake, making James a fraud. M. Pagnol's believed in James's good faith though, admitting that he sincerely believed he was the bastard son of Charles II.

=== The meeting with Charles II ===
In his last letter, Charles II recommended that James call in to visit his sister Henrietta of England in Paris who could have him ordained as a priest. Knowing this letter was a fake, it was then James who, by the same process of a false supporting letter from Charles II, would have requested an audience with Henrietta of England. Moreover, M. Pagnol also cited a letter of 20 January 1669 by Charles II to Henrietta of England, which referred to a previous letter from Henrietta to Charles delivered by a certain "Italian" identified as James coming from Rome.

M. Pagnol concluded that Henrietta received James, in whom she immediately recognised a resemblance to her cousin Louis XIV (she was living in France) and handed him a letter for the attention of Charles II, judiciously leaving to him the responsibility of ordaining James. When James gave the letter to Charles II in London in early 1669, the king recognised him and revealed to him the secret of his birth - information which he certainly inherited from his mother Henrietta of France. Learning that he should reigning instead of his twin brother, James is sent by Charles II to Roux de Marcilly who organised a conspiracy against Louis XIV of which all the English Ministers were aware.

In his essay, Marcel Pagnol demonstrates that the famous prisoner in the Iron Mask was not Italian. Identifying James de la Cloche as the prisoner, James would therefore not be the Abbot Pregnani, as Mgr Barnes claims. As for Prince "Stuardo" M. Pagnol believes that he cannot be the Prince Stuart (in this case James de la Cloche), who would certainly not have returned to Italy to spend the fortune defrauded from the Jesuits in Rome. So it would therefore have been James's butler who, on learning of the arrest of his master, took his money and usurped his identity before fleeing to Naples.

== Sources and further reading ==
- Lang, Andrew (1911). "La Cloche, James de" . In Chisholm, Hugh (ed.). Encyclopædia Britannica. Vol. 16 (11th ed.). Cambridge University Press. pp. 50–51.
- Giovanni Tarantino, Jacques de la Cloche: A Stuart Pretender in the Seventeenth Century, in Archivum Historicum Societatis Iesu, LXXIII (June-Dec., 2004).
- Steuart, A. Francis, "The Neapolitan Stuarts", in The English Historical Review, Vol. 18, no. 71 (July 1903).
