= Sigoulès =

Commune in Dordogne, France

- Part of Sigoulès-et-Flaugeac
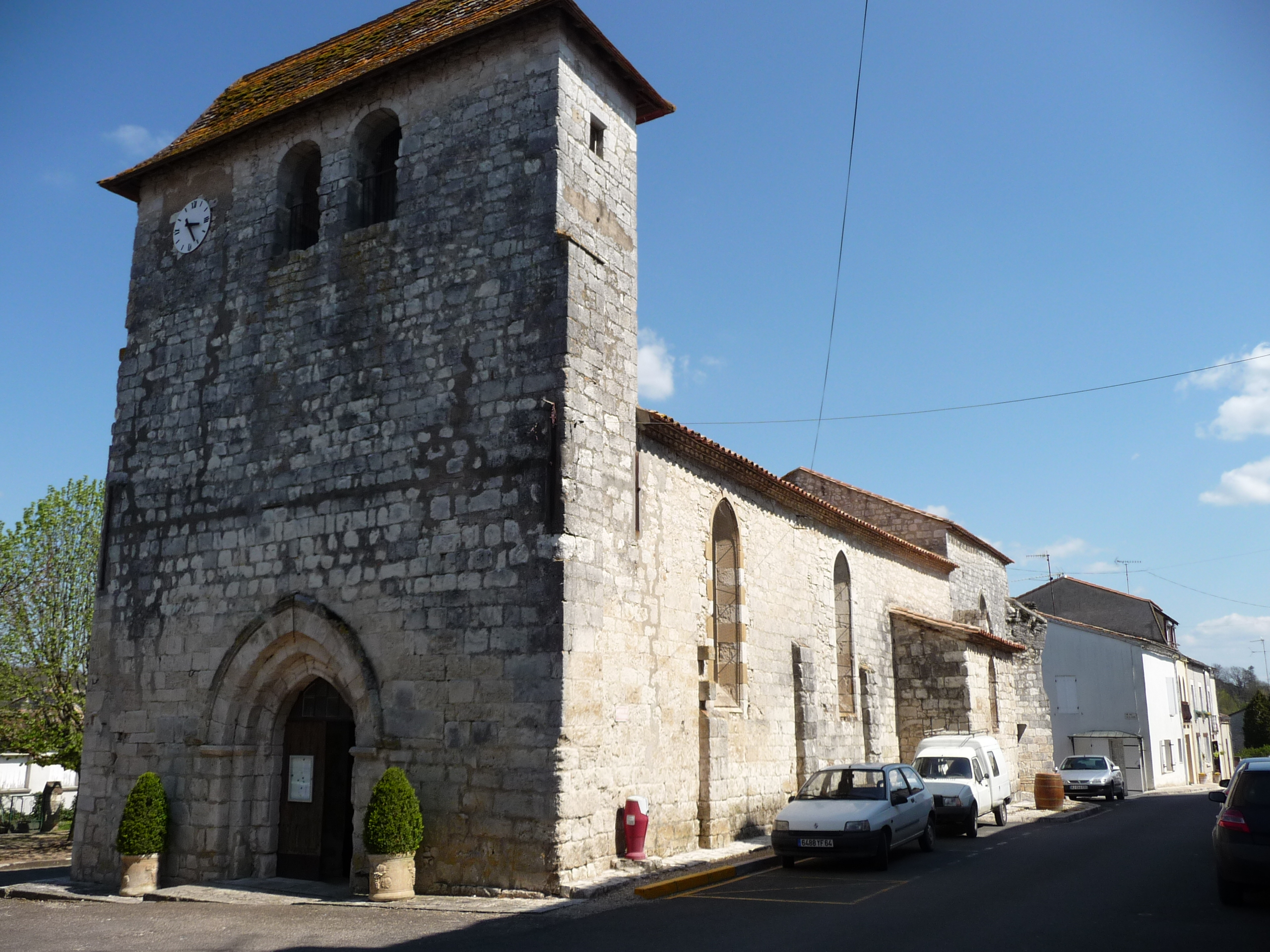

- Coat of arms
- Location of Sigoulès
- Location within France Location within Nouvelle-Aquitaine
- Coordinates: 44°45′35″N 0°24′40″E
- Country: France
- Region: Nouvelle-Aquitaine
- Department: Dordogne
- Arrondissement: Bergerac
- Canton: Sud-Bergeracois
- Commune: Sigoulès-et-Flaugeac
- Area^{1}: 10.86 km^{2} (4.19 sq mi)
- Highest elevation: 157 m (515 ft)
- Lowest elevation: 51 m (167 ft)
- Population (2017): 900
  - Density: 83/km^{2} (210/sq mi)
- Time zone: UTC+01:00 (CET)
  - Summer (DST): UTC+02:00 (CEST)
- Postal code: 24240
- ^{1} French Land Register data, which excludes lakes, ponds, glaciers > 1 km^{2} (0.386 sq mi or 247 acres) and river estuaries.

Sigoulès (French pronunciation: [siɡulɛs]; Occitan: Lo Sigolés) is a former commune in the Dordogne department in Nouvelle-Aquitaine in southwestern France. On 1 January 2019, it was merged into the new commune Sigoulès-et-Flaugeac.

== Population ==
Historical population
Year	Pop.	±% p.a.
1962	571	—
1968	616	+1.27%
1975	600	−0.38%
1982	574	−0.63%
1990	603	+0.62%
1999	694	+1.57%
2017	900	+1.45%
Source: EHESS and INSEE

== See also ==
- Communes of the Dordogne département
