= Flaugeac =

Commune in Dordogne, France

- Part of Sigoulès-et-Flaugeac
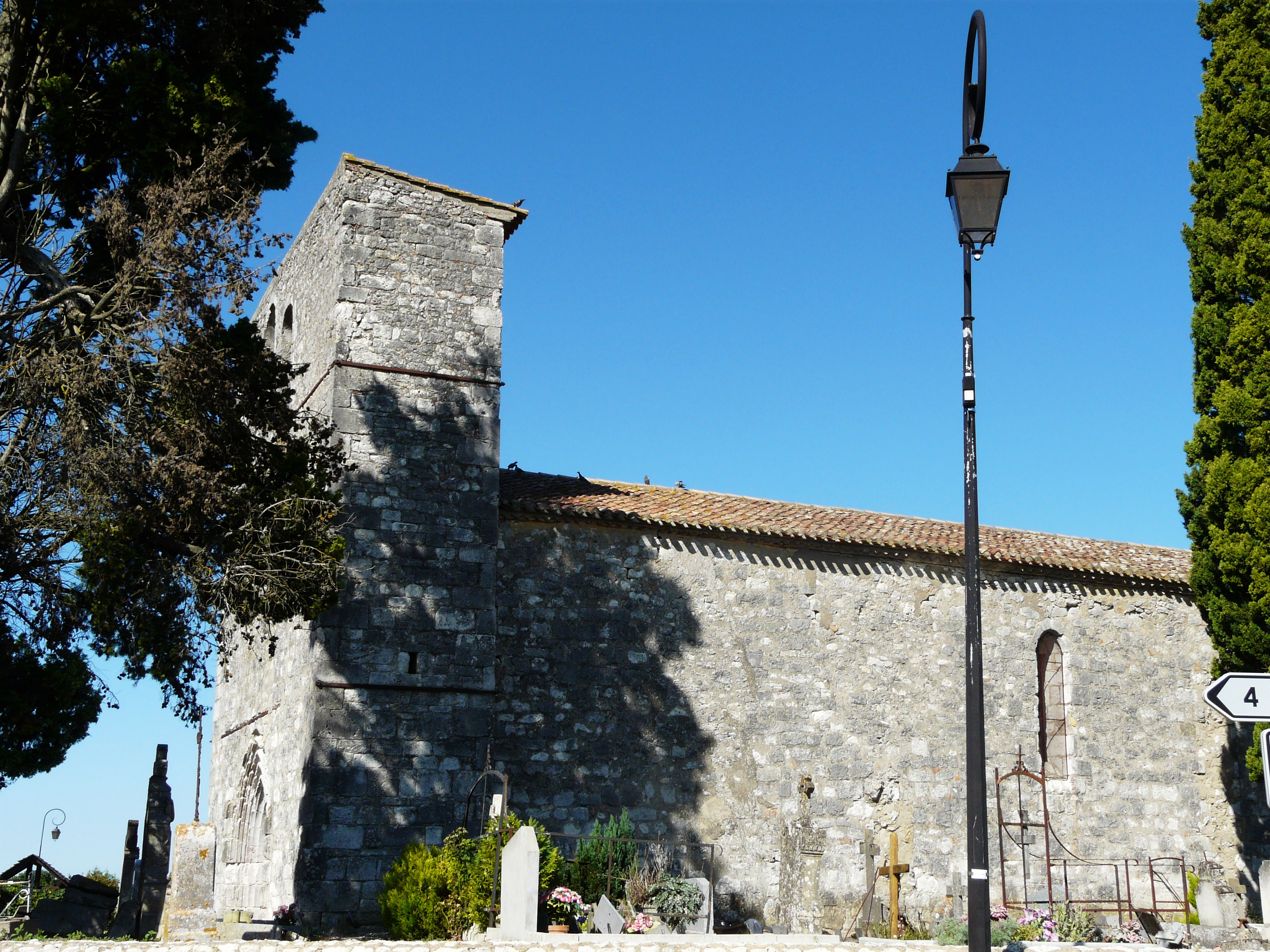
- Location of Flaugeac
- Location within France Location within Nouvelle-Aquitaine
- Coordinates: 44°44′53″N 0°26′35″E
- Country: France
- Region: Nouvelle-Aquitaine
- Department: Dordogne
- Arrondissement: Bergerac
- Canton: Sud-Bergeracois
- Commune: Sigoulès-et-Flaugeac
- Area^{1}: 7.35 km^{2} (2.84 sq mi)
- Elevation: 156 m (512 ft)
- Highest elevation: 186 m (610 ft)
- Lowest elevation: 57 m (187 ft)
- Population (2017): 325
  - Density: 44.2/km^{2} (115/sq mi)
- Time zone: UTC+01:00 (CET)
  - Summer (DST): UTC+02:00 (CEST)
- Postal code: 24240
- ^{1} French Land Register data, which excludes lakes, ponds, glaciers > 1 km^{2} (0.386 sq mi or 247 acres) and river estuaries.

Flaugeac (French pronunciation: [floʒak]; Occitan: Flaujac) is a former commune in the Dordogne department in Nouvelle-Aquitaine in southwestern France. On 1 January 2019, it was merged into the new commune Sigoulès-et-Flaugeac.

== See also ==
- Communes of the Dordogne department
