= Primi Visconti =

Italian nobleman and memoir writer

Giovanni Battista Feliciano Fassola de Rasa, count de San Maiolo, commonly known as Primi Visconti (1648- 1713) was an Italian nobleman and memoir writer. Officially a diplomat, he functioned as an astrologer for high society and appear to have acted as a spy. He is most known for his memoirs, which describe the French royal court during the 1670s.

== Life ==
He was born in the Spanish province the Duchy of Milan to the Italian nobleman Giacomo Fassola di Rassa and Maria Marta.

In 1672, after a inheritance dispute, he left Italy for Paris in France via Switzerland. In Paris, he became a popular astrologer with clients among the nobility. He acquired the protection of the Louis-Joseph, duc de Vendôme, and Philippe de Vendôme, who introduced him to Louis XIV at the royal French court in 1673. Officially he referred to himself as a diplomat during his period at the French court. In reality however he supported himself by making horoscopes and telling the fortune of people in high society. he is noted to have made several trips between the French court, the English court and the Netherlands, during which he is believed to have sold information as a spy.

== Memoirs ==
Primi Visconti is known from the famous memoirs he wrote about his time at the French royal court, where he described several famous individuals and events of the time, such as the Affair of the Poisons.

- Mémoires sur la cour de Louis XIV, 1673-1681
