= Camille Le Tellier =

French clergyman

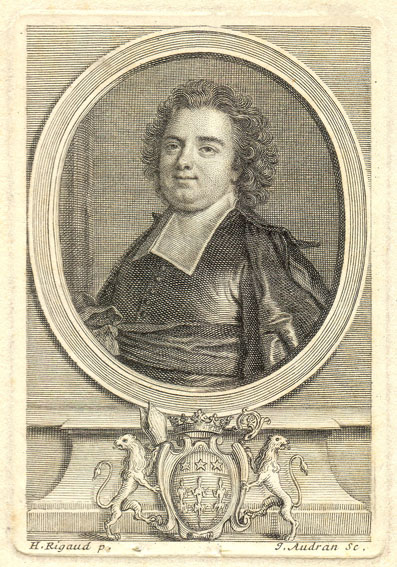
The Abbé de Louvois in an engraving by Audran after Rigaud

Camille Le Tellier (11 April 1675 – 5 November 1718) was a French clergyman and member of several royal academies in the reign of Louis XIV. He was the fourth member elected to occupy seat 4 of the Académie française in 1706.

He was born in Paris, the fourth son of François Michel Le Tellier de Louvois. He received a doctorate from the Sorbonne at the age of 25. He served as curator of the cabinet des médailles, that is of coins and medals, at the royal library at the Louvre. He was a member of the Academy of Sciences, of the Académie des Inscriptions et Belles-Lettres and, from 1706, of the Académie française where he replaced Jean Testu de Mauroy.
