= Louis François Marie Le Tellier =

Louis Phélypeaux
- Marquis of Barbezieux
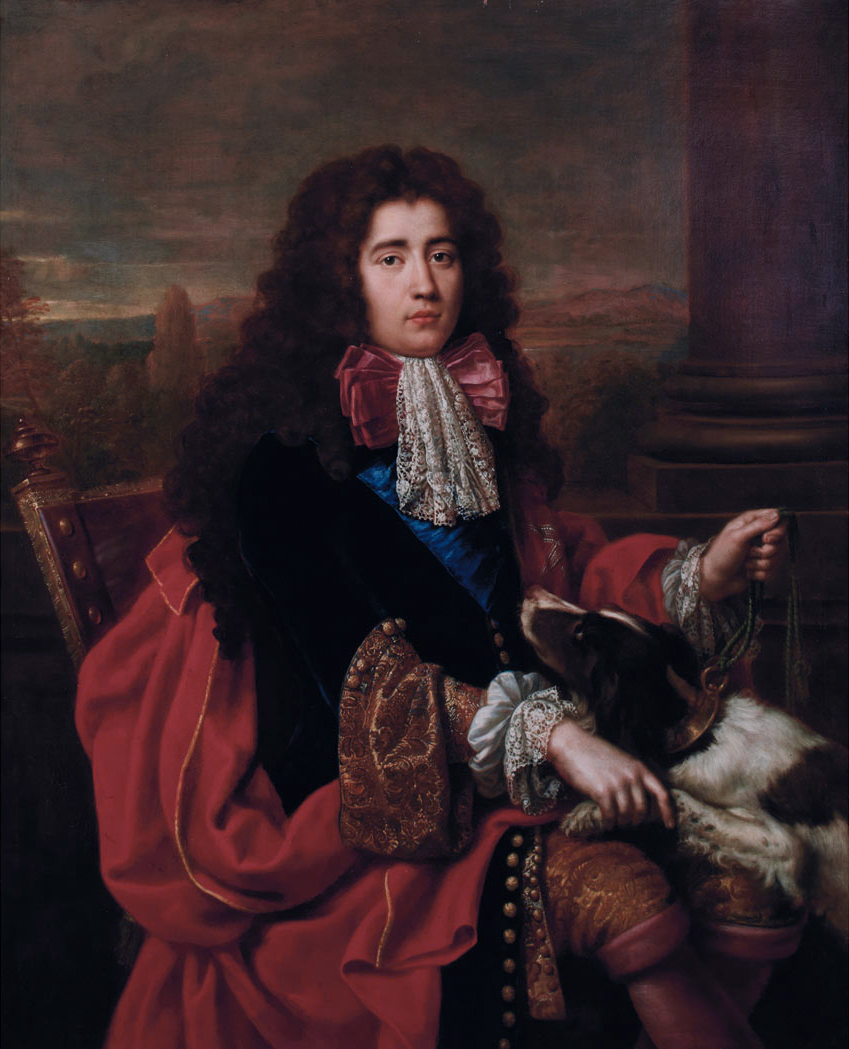
- Full name: Louis François Marie Le Tellier
- Born: 23 June 1668; Paris, France
- Died: 5 January 1701 (aged 33); Versailles, France
- Spouses: Louise de Crussol (12 November 1691); Marie Thérèse d'Alègre (11 January 1696)
- Issue: Marie Madeleine, Duchess of Harcourt; Louise Françoise, Princess of Turenne
- Father: François Michel Le Tellier, Marquis of Louvois
- Mother: Anne de Souvré
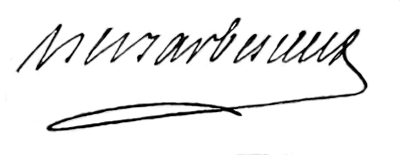
- Signature

Louis François Marie Le Tellier, Marquis of Barbezieux (French: [lwi fʁɑ̃swa maʁi lə təlje]; 23 June 1668 – 5 January 1701) was a French statesman.

== Biography ==
Born in Barbezieux-Saint-Hilaire, County of Saintonge, he was the third son of the Marquis de Louvois, War Minister to Louis XIV.

After the death of Louvois, Louis XIV appointed Barbezieux to succeed his father and grandfather, becoming the third Le Tellier to serve Louis XIV at the War Ministry. Although talented, the 23-year-old neglected his office in favour of his pleasures. The King complained to Barbezieux's uncle, Charles-Maurice Le Tellier, Archbishop of Reims that:

Your nephew has talents, but he does not make good use of them. He prefers to dine with princes rather than work. He neglected his affairs for his pleasures. He leaves officers waiting too long in his antechamber; he speaks to them disdainfully and sometimes harshly.

=== Marriage and Children ===
Barbezieux was twice married:

- firstly in 1691 to Louise de Crussol (died 1694), daughter of Emmanuel II de Crussol, Duc d'Uzès, with whom he had one daughter :
  - Anne-Catherine-Eléonore (died 1716).
- secondly in 1696 to Marie Thérèse d'Alègre (died 1706), daughter of Yves d'Alègre, with whom he had two daughters :
  - Marie-Madeleine, married François, Duke of Harcourt (1689-1750), they are the ancestors of Duke of Richelieu and Empress Elisabeth of Austria.
  - Louise Françoise Angélique Le Tellier (died 1718). Made a splendid marriage with Emmanuel Théodose de La Tour d'Auvergne, son of the Duke of Bouillon and Marie Anne Mancini. She died giving birth to a son, Godefroy Girault de La Tour d'Auvergne, Duke of Château-Thierry.

| Preceded by François-Michel le Tellier | Secretary of State for War; 16 July 1691 - 5 January 1701 | Succeeded by Michel Chamillart |
