= François-Michel le Tellier, Marquis de Louvois =

Secretary of State for War under Louis XIV

François Michel Le Tellier Marquis de Louvois
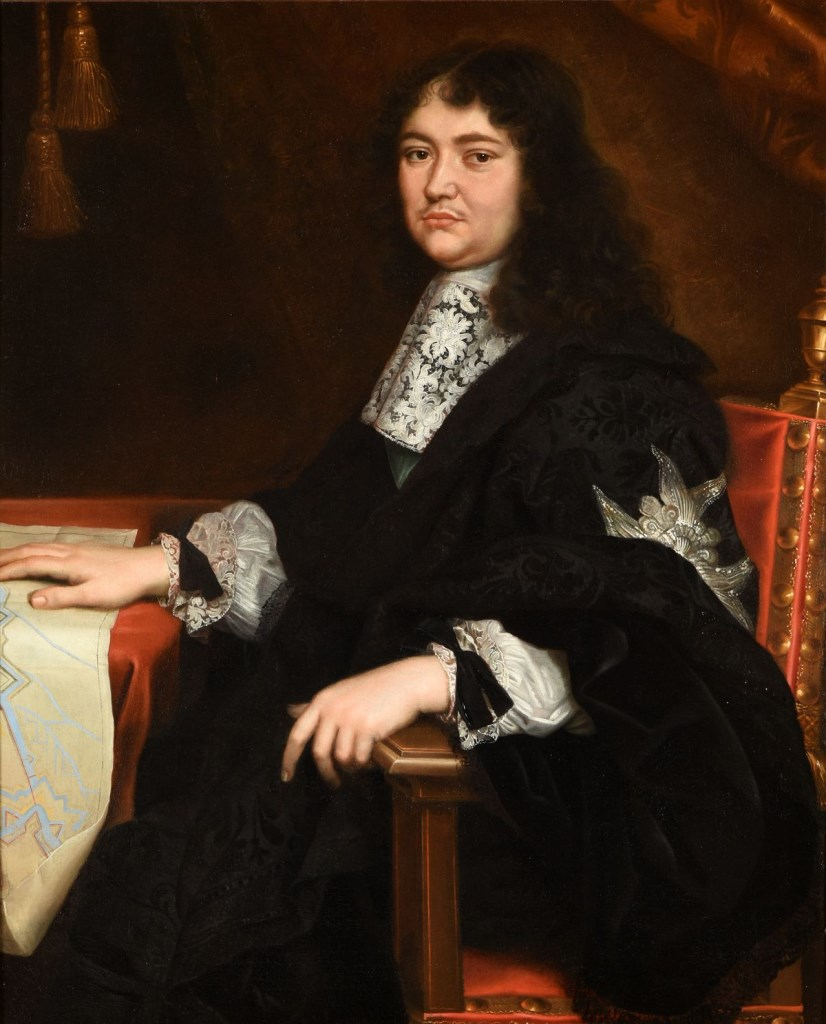
- Portrait by Pierre Mignard (Musée des Beaux-Arts, Reims)

Chief minister of France
- In office 7 September 1683 – 16 July 1691
- Monarch: Louis XIV
- Preceded by: Jean-Baptiste Colbert
- Succeeded by: Vacant (1691–1715); Guillaume Dubois

Secretary of State of the Maison du Roi
- In office 6 September 1683 – 16 July 1691
- Monarch: Louis XIV
- Preceded by: Jean-Baptiste Colbert
- Succeeded by: Édouard Colbert de Villacerf

Secretary of State for War
- In office 27 October 1677 – 16 July 1691
- Monarch: Louis XIV
- Preceded by: Michel Le Tellier
- Succeeded by: Louis François Marie Le Tellier

Governor of the Franche-Comte
- In office 8 February – 9 June 1668
- Monarch: Louis XIV
- Preceded by: Office established
- Succeeded by: Charles Eugene, 2nd Duke of Arenberg (as Spanish governor)
- In office 15 May 1674 – 30 July 1675
- Monarch: Louis XIV
- Preceded by: Francisco González de Alvelda (as Spanish governor)
- Succeeded by: Jacques Henri de Durfort, 1st Duke of Duras

Personal details
- Born: 18 January 1641 Paris, France
- Died: 16 July 1691 (aged 50) Versailles, France
- Spouse: Anne de Souvré (m. 1662–1691)
- Children: Michel-François; Madeleine Charlotte; Louis-Nicolas; Louis François; Camille; Marguerite
- Parent(s): Michel Le Tellier; Élisabeth Turpin

François Michel Le Tellier, Marquis de Louvois (French: [fʁɑ̃swa miʃɛl lə təlje maʁki də luvwa]; 18 January 1641 – 16 July 1691) was the French Secretary of State for War during a significant part of the reign of Louis XIV. He is commonly referred to as "Louvois". Together with his father, Michel le Tellier, he oversaw an increase in the numbers of the French Army, eventually reaching 340,000 soldiers – an army that would fight four wars between 1667 and 1713. Louvois was a key military and strategic advisor to Louis XIV, who transformed the French Army into an instrument of royal authority and foreign policy.

According to Cathal Nolan, he created the Régiment du Roi in 1663 and founded the Royal-Artillerie regiment in 1673. These innovations influenced military planners beyond France. Louvois sought out new wars as a means of concentrating more power and wealth in his own hands. He reorganized the French Army and exercised strict control over officers, but that resulted in slower tactical and operational response times.

He had more success upgrading logistics for armies on the move. He also improved the magazine system left by his father. He accumulated enough grain and wagons to provide his armies with 200,000 rations per day for up to six months during the Franco-Dutch War (1672-1678). This helped ensure the French king's early victories. Despite his flaws, Louvois is appreciated by historians for creating the role of civilian "minister of war".

== Early life ==
Louvois was born in Paris on 18 January 1641, to Michel Le Tellier and Élisabeth Turpin. He received instructions from his father in the management of state affairs. The young man won the king's confidence, and in 1666 he succeeded his father as war minister.

His talents were noticed by Turenne in the War of Devolution (1667–1668), who gave him instruction in the art of supplying armies. After the peace of Aix-la-Chapelle, Louvois devoted himself to organising the French army. The years between 1668 and 1672, says Camille Rousset, "were years of preparation, when Lionne was labouring with all his might to find allies, Colbert to find money, and Louvois soldiers for Louis".

The Man in the Iron Mask, whose name was given as Eustache Dauger, was first mentioned in a letter written by Louvois, dated 19 July 1669.

== Work ==
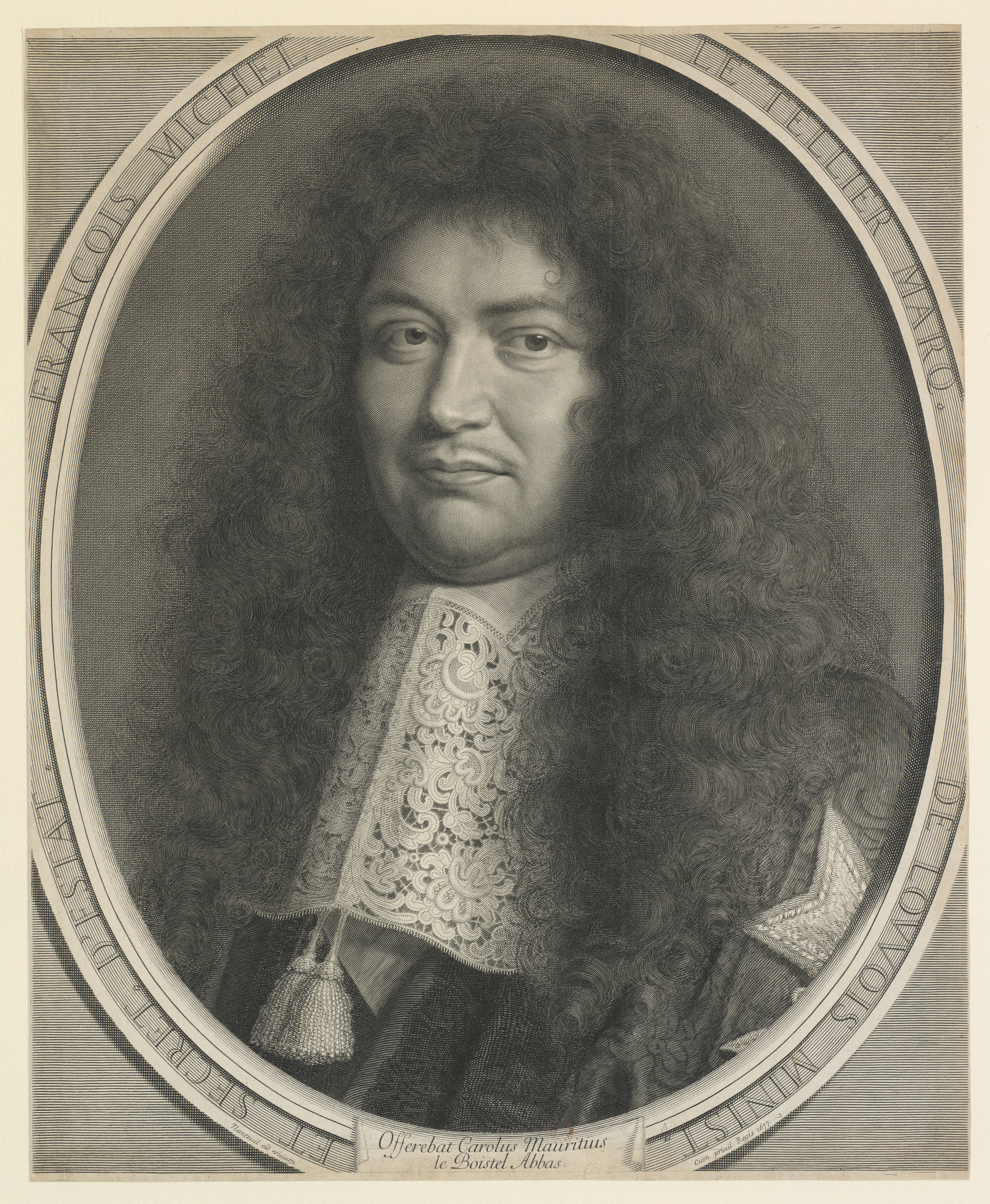
Portrait engraved from life in 1677 by Robert Nanteuil

The work of Louvois in these years is bound up with the historical development of the French army and of armies in general. Here need only be mentioned Louvois's reorganization of the military orders of merit, his foundation of the Hôtel des Invalides, and the almost forcible enrollment of the nobility and gentry of France, in which Louvois carried out part of Louis's measures for curbing the spirit of independence by service in the army or at court.

The success of his measures is to be seen in the victories of the Franco-Dutch War of 1672–1678. After the Peace of Nijmegen Louvois was high in favour, his father had been made chancellor, and the influence of Colbert was waning. The ten years of peace between 1678 and 1688 were distinguished in French history by the rise of Madame de Maintenon, the capture of Strasbourg and the revocation of the Edict of Nantes, in all of which Louvois bore a prominent part. The surprise of Strasbourg in 1681 in time of peace was not only planned but executed by Louvois and Monclar. A saving clause in the revocation of the Edict of Nantes, which provided for some liberty of conscience, if not of worship, Louvois sharply annulled with the phrase "Sa majesté veut qu'on fasse sentir les dernières rigueurs a ceux qui ne voudront pas se faire de sa religion" ("His Majesty wishes the worst harshness on those who do not partake of his religion").

He claimed also the credit of inventing the dragonnades, and mitigated the depredations of the soldiery only insofar as the licence accorded was prejudicial to discipline. Discipline, indeed, and complete subjection to the royal authority was the political faith of Louvois.

== Later life ==
Colbert died in 1683 and had been replaced by Le Pelletier, an adherent of Louvois, in the controller-generalship of finances, and by Louvois himself in his ministry for public buildings, which he took that he might be the minister able to gratify the king's two favourite pastimes, war and building. Louvois was able to superintend the successes of the first years of the war of the League of Augsburg and in 1688 initiated the collection of Plans-Reliefs of French strongholds that is now the Musée des Plans-Reliefs. However, he died suddenly of apoplexy after leaving the king's cabinet on 16 July 1691, but Voltaire claims in "Le Siecle de Louis XIV" that Louvois died while he was taking waters in Balaruc. His sudden death caused suspicion of poison.

== Legacy ==
As the Secretary of State for War under Louis XIV, Louvois strengthened the French military: he expanded the French Army to 340,000 soldiers, created influential regiments, and enhanced military logistics, such as introducing portable ovens and improving the magazine system. Louvois also founded the Hôtel des Invalides and reorganized military orders of merit. French history often compares him to Carnot, as both had to reorganize armies using existing resources and new systems, and both were committed to the well-being of soldiers. Despite his unscrupulous methods in his own private life and his work, including harsh measures against Huguenots, Louvois is credited with establishing the role of the civilian "minister of war," leaving a lasting impact on military administration in France.

== Family ==
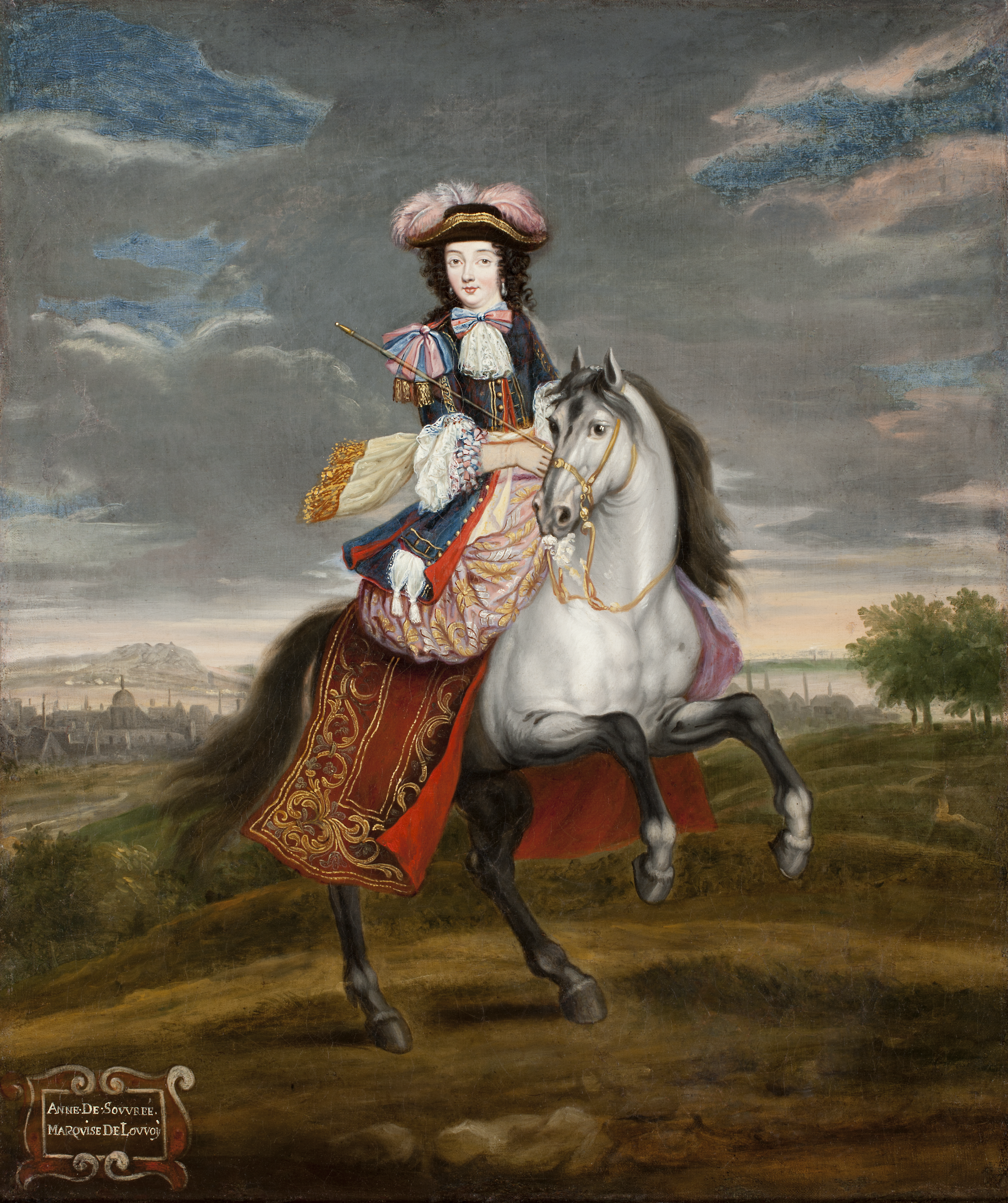
Portrait of Anne de Souvree, 1670s

Louvois, through a marriage arranged by his father, wed an heiress, Anne de Souvré, Marquise de Courtenvaux.

He had six children with Anne:

- Michael François, Marquis de Courtanvaux, who married the daughter of Jean II d'Estrées
- Madeleine Charlotte (1665–1735), who married François de La Rochefoucauld VIII, Duc de La Roche-Guyon (1663–1728)
- Louis-Nicolas, Marquis de Souvré
- Louis François Marie, Marquis Barbezieux
- Camille de Louvois
- Margaret (died 1711), married Louis Nicolas de Neufville de Villeroy, Marquis de Alincourt

== See also ==
- French government ministers
- List of finance ministers of France
- Fort Louvois

== Notes ==
Political offices
Preceded by Michel le Tellier	Secretary of State for War; 1666–1691	Succeeded by Louis-François le Tellier de Louvois, marquis de Barbezieux
