= Île Sainte-Marguerite =

Island in Cannes, France

Sainte Marguerite Island
Native name: Île Sainte-Marguerite Nickname: Lero
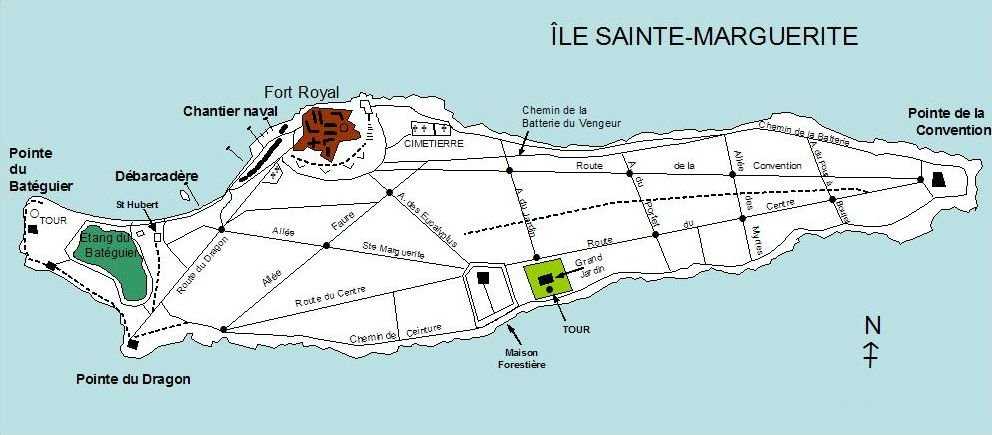
- Map of Sainte Marguerite Island
- Interactive map of Sainte Marguerite Island
- Etymology: Martyr Saint Margaret of Antioch

Geography
- Location: Mediterranean Sea
- Coordinates: 43°31′10″N 7°03′00″E
- Archipelago: Lérins Islands
- Area: 2.1 km^{2} (0.81 sq mi)
- Length: 3 km (1.9 mi)
- Width: 900 m (3000 ft)
- Highest elevation: 27.6 m (90.6 ft)

Administration
- France
- Region: Provence-Alpes-Côte d'Azur
- Department: Alpes-Maritimes
- Municipality: Cannes

Demographics
- Population: 20 (2016)
- Pop. density: 9.52/km^{2} (24.66/sq mi)
- Languages: French

Additional information
- Time zone: UTC+01:00
- Sainte Marguerite Island

Île Sainte-Marguerite (pronounced [il sɛ̃tmaʁɡ(ə)ʁit]; French: Île Sainte-Marguerite, transl. Saint Margaret Island) is the largest of the Lérins Islands, about half a mile offshore from the French Riviera city of Cannes, situated in the Bay of Cannes. The island is approximately 3,200 metres (2.0 miles) in length (east to west) and 950 metres (0.59 miles) across (north to south). Sainte Marguerite Island is the closest of the Lérins Islands to Cannes, just 700 metres from the Palm-Beach headland, and the most extensive, covering an area of 2.1 square kilometres (210 hectares). It reaches an altitude of only 27.6 metres (0.0171 miles) in the north, near the fort.

The island is most famous for its fortress prison, entitled the "Fort Royal" (French: "Fort Royal"), in which the so-called Man in the Iron Mask was held for 11 years (1687–1698) of his 34 years of imprisonment.

== The island ==
The island was known to be occupied in 6 BC by a Celtic-Ligurian population. In 3 AD, it was under Roman occupation, when it was known by the name Lero, on account of an altar or temple having been erected there to honour Lero, a celebrated pirate chief.

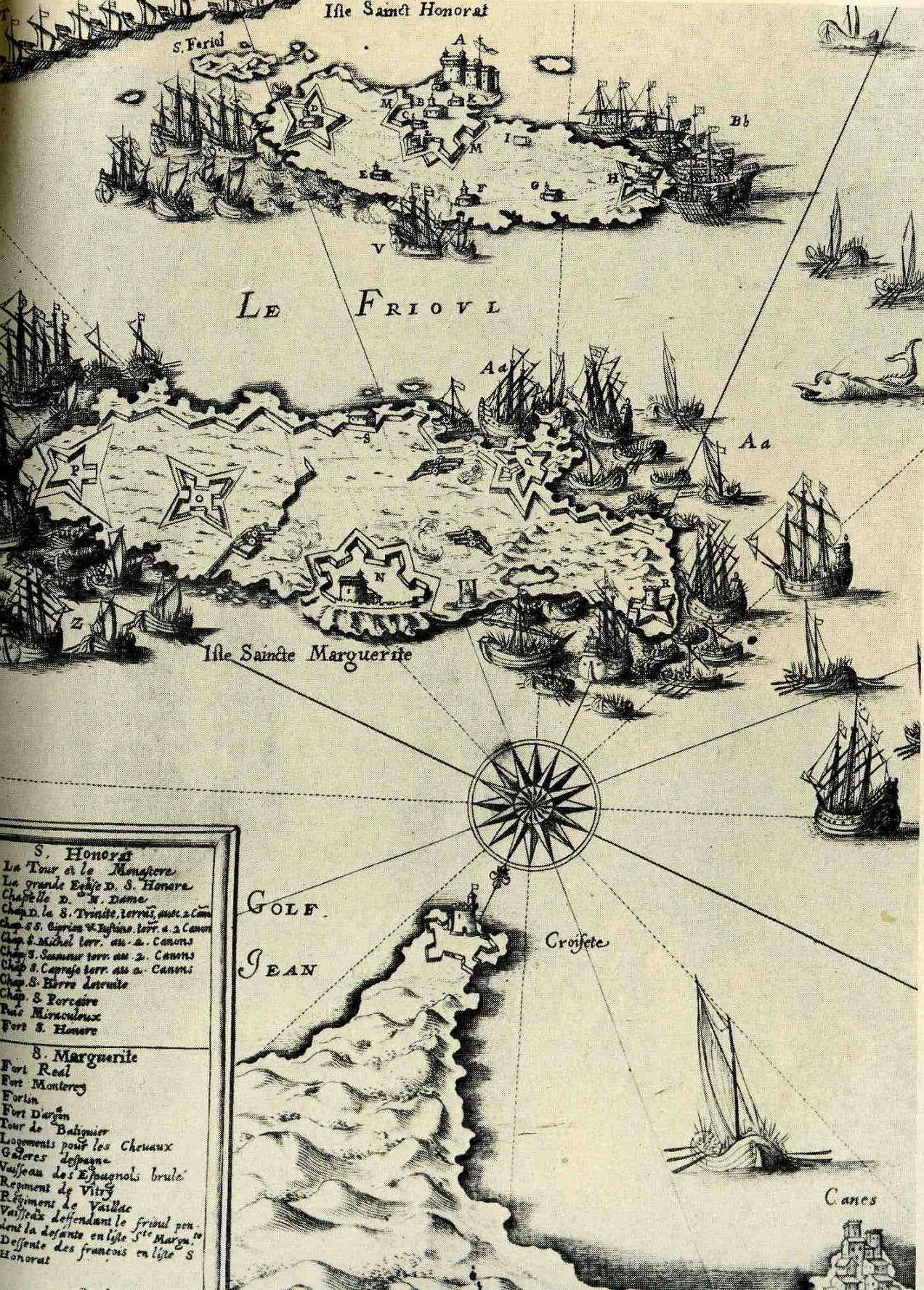
Map of 1639 representing the recapture of the Lérins Islands in 1637 by the French from the Spanish.

In medieval times, during the first centuries of Christianity, the island was named in honour of the martyr Saint Margaret of Antioch by the crusaders, who built a chapel on the island dedicate to her. In the 14th century, probably due to the writings of Raymond Féraud, the island became associated with a fictional Sainte Marguerite, sister to Saint Honoratus, founder of the monastery on the neighboring Île Saint-Honorat. According to legend, Sainte Marguerite led a community of nuns on the island which was named after her. In 1612, ownership of the island passed from the monks of Saint-Honorat to Claude de Lorraine, Duke of Chevreuse. In 1635, the island was captured by the Spanish The Spanish developed a system for collecting rainwater which was purified in four decantation basins, and collected into two tanks set under a well to serve the 800 men stationed on the island. Two years later in 1637, the island was recaptured by the French.

In 1746 the islands were lost to the Austrians and the English for a year; and in WWII first the Italians then the Germans occupied it.

== Fort Royal ==
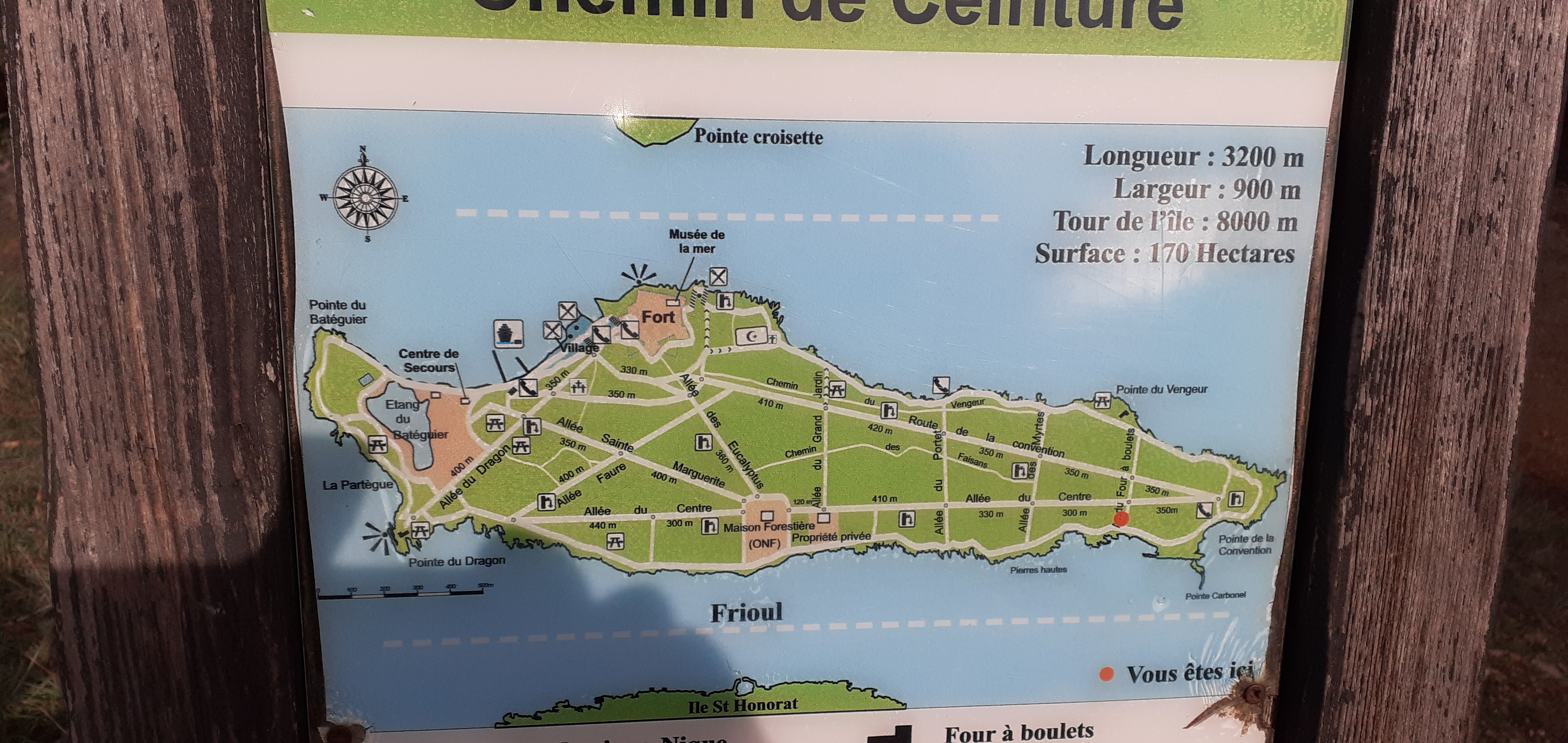
Island's ring road (overview)

=== Structure ===
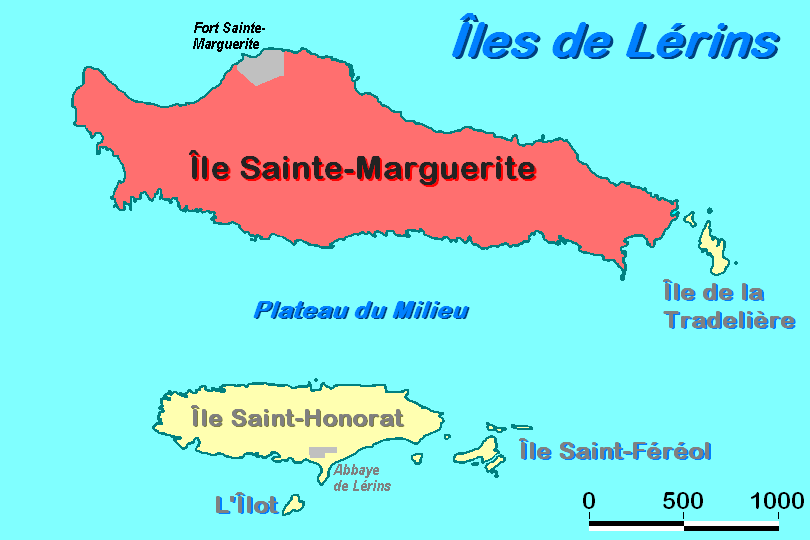
Location of Saint Marguerite Island within Lerins Islands

In Gallo-Roman times, the site consisted of nothing more than a simple fortified house, and several cistern buildings, which still exist from this time. Rocher Tower was built on the corner of the building in the Middle Ages to protect the island from regular Saracen attacks. In 1617, the Duke de Guise gave Jean de Bellon the task of building a fort intended to block access to Cannes. The fort was constructed between 1624 and 1627. The fort underwent extension in 1635 during the Spanish occupation, including two bastions, and the first barracks buildings.

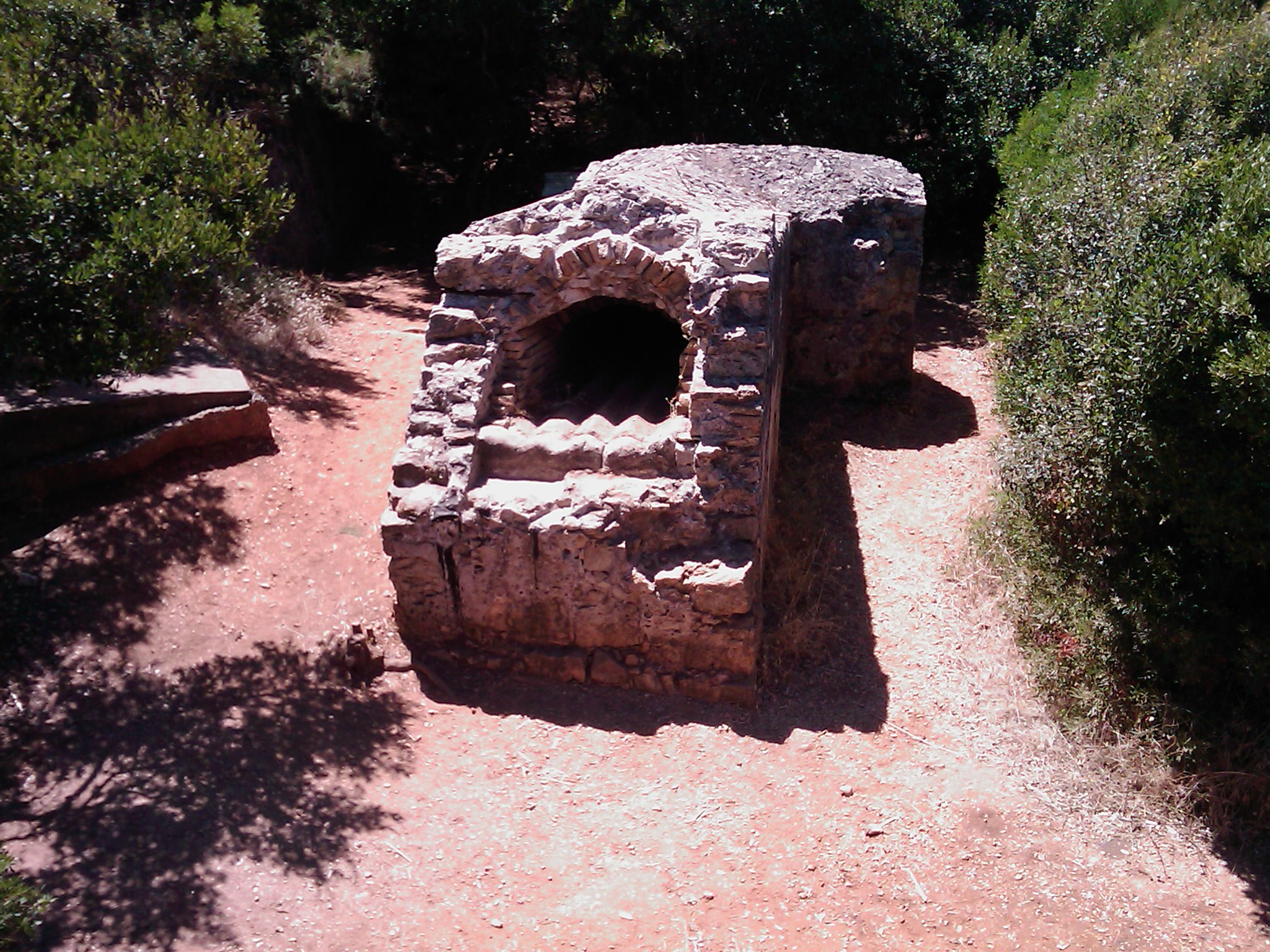
The cannon ball furnace at the Dragon's Point.

When the island was recatured by the French in 1637, it building was named the Royal Fort (French: "Fort Royal"). The French strengthened the fortifications considerably, including deepening of the moats, raising the curtain wall, and linking two demi-lunes to the fort via elevated walkways (since disappeared). Guitaut, the French royal governor, also had a "tenaille" built, a low bastion placed in front of the entrance gates to the fort, which bears his name today. At the end of the 17th Century, when the Louis XIV's general commissioner of fortifications (Vauban) personally inspected the fort, he gave instructions to strengthen the square, giving the fort its current appearance. Currently, the pentagonal-shaped fort rises 26 metres above sea level to project over a rocky cliff on the northern coast of the Island, opposite Cape Croisette. It is flanked by four bastions at its weak points, on the land side, and on the coastal side, the structure's stone ramparts are supported by an earth embankment blended into the sheer cliff. Inside the compound, a chapel, several barns (for housing the troops), and artillery (including the powder store surrounded by the walls of the royal bastion to the fort's south, probably to reduce the consequences of any accidental explosion).

=== Prison ===
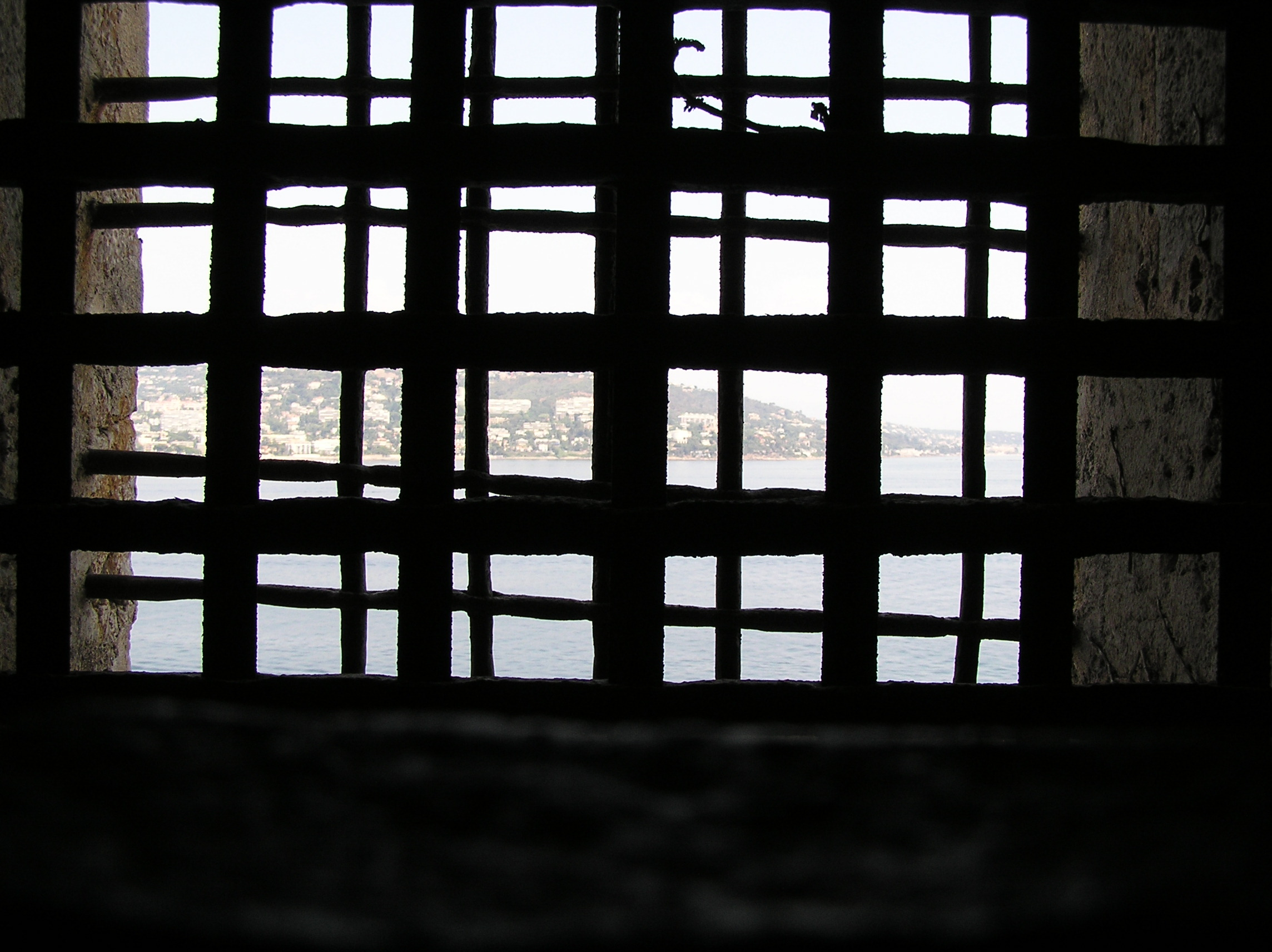
View of a cell similar to that of the Iron Mask.

From 1637 onwards, the first cells were fitted out in the governor's château. In 1685, at a time when the Royal Fort accommodated a large garrison, the fort was dedicated definitively and first and foremost to be used as a state prison. In 1687, Governor Saint-Mars, on the orders of Louis XIV, had a parallelepiped stone building constructed inside the compound, inside which several cells were soon fitted out. The Royal Fort also has a smaller detention area, reserved for soldiers.

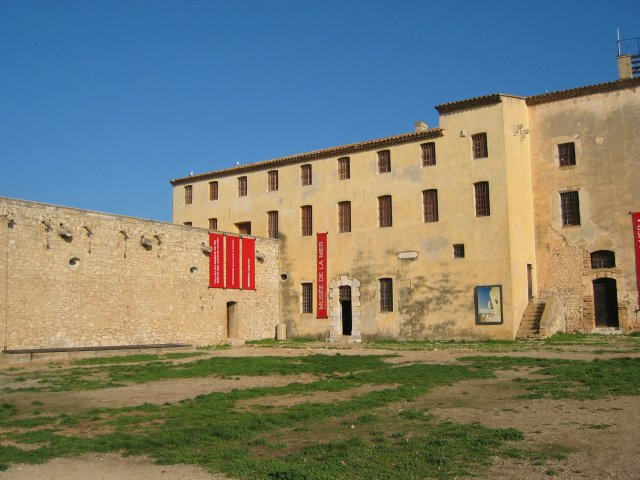
Museum of the sea & prison of the iron mask.

In 1685, the Fort of Sainte-Marguerite Island was one of the four places of imprisonment for Huguenots, when the Edict of Nantes was revoked by Louis XIV. In 1950, a Huguenot memorial was set up in a former cell to honor six Protestant ministers, Paul Cardel, Pierre de Salve, Gabriel Mathurin, Mathieu de Malzac, Elisée Giraud, and Jean Gardien Givry, who were incarcerated in the fort for life, and subsequently in October 1985, to commemorate the tricentenary of the Revocation of the Edict of Nantes, President François Mitterrand of France announced a formal apology to the descendants of Huguenots around the world.

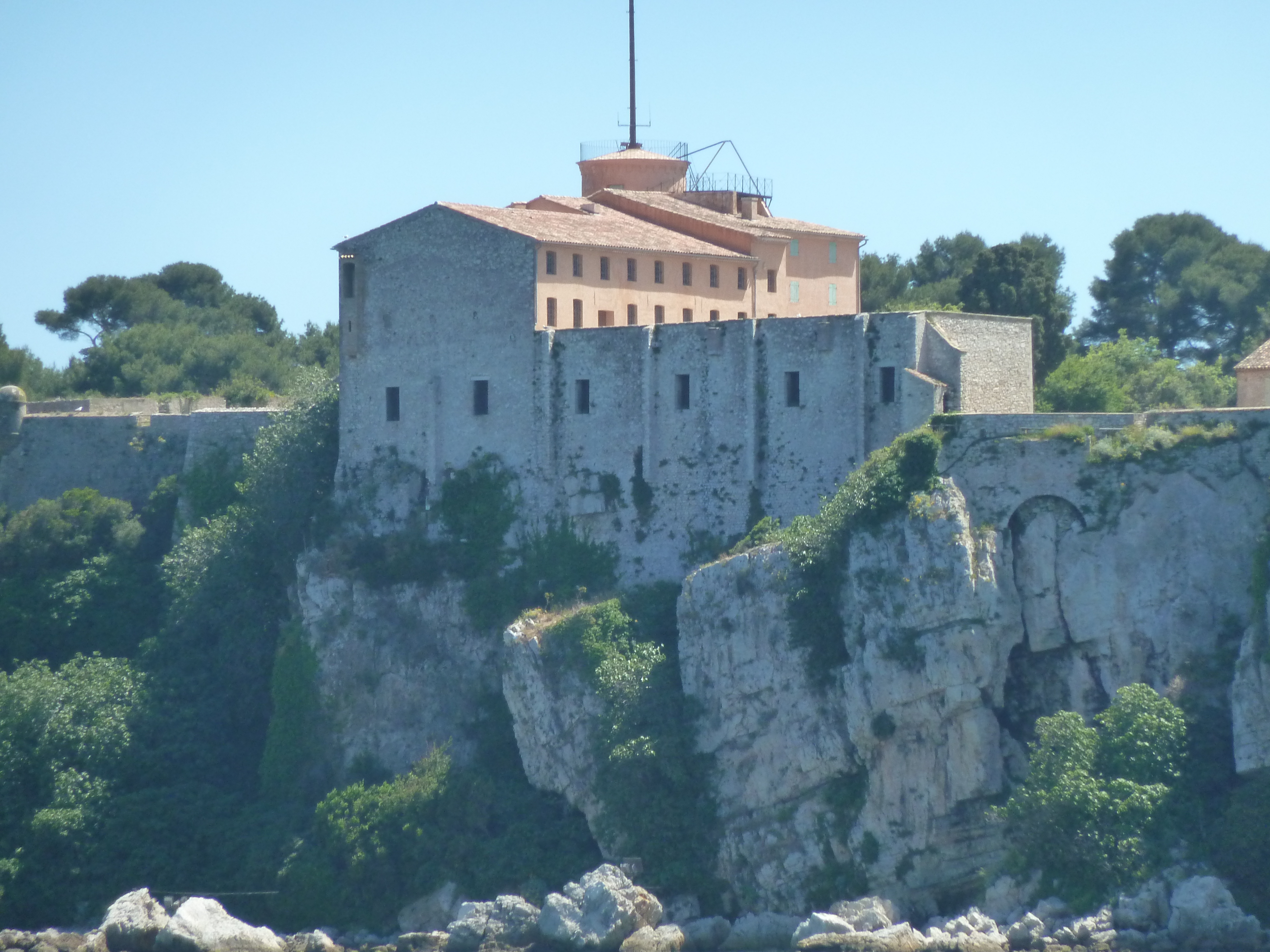
Exterior facade of the cells of the fort.

Until 1841, there were only 37 or 38 male prisoners on the island of Sainte Marguerite. However, in 1841, France's Ministry of War commissioned a report on the feasibility of the fort acting as a "prison likely to receive political detainees or prisoners of war" from Algeria. The report (26 April 1841) from the president of the Fortifications Committee, V. Dode, confirmed its suitability, considering it possible to house 400 prisoners. Four days later, a ministerial decree assigned the prison fort for "the detention of Arab prisoners transported from Algeria to France". The prisoners were not "judicial convicts", but specified as political prisoners or prisoners of war, therefore the length of incarceration was rarely mentioned, instead using phrasing like: "men whom politics orders to remove from Algeria for a certain time" or "detained until further notice ... The complete pacification of their country could contribute to their enlargement".

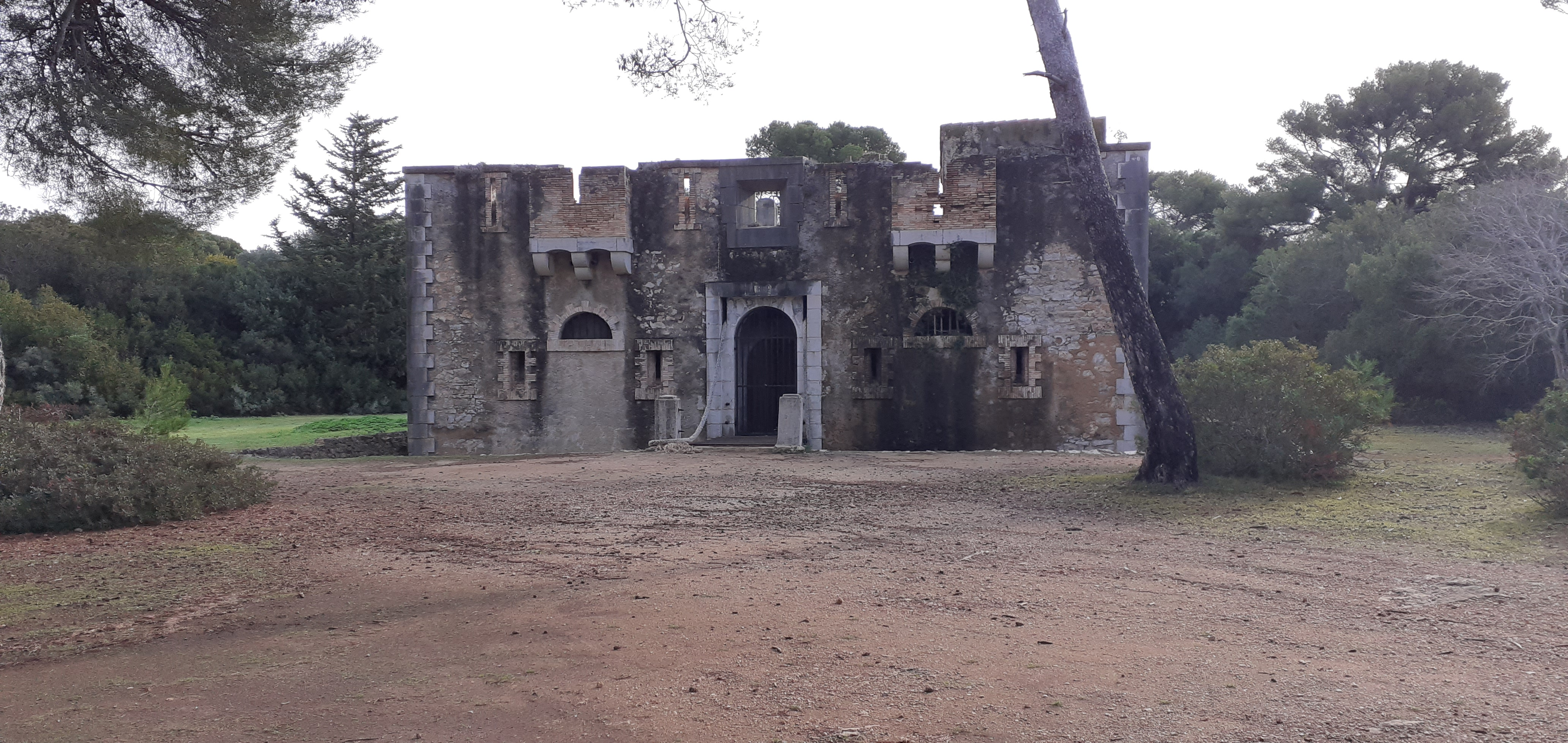
Convention Battery.

This included prisoners from the Battle of the Smala. The first group, transported on the barge La Provençale which left on 22 June 1843, arrived on 26 June 1843, carrying an estimate 290 prisoners. The second group arrived on 9 August 1843 carrying 186 prisoners. Women and men were separated. In September 1843, the fort housed 520 people (not all of whom belonged to the former smala of Abd el-Kader) and Doctor Bosio estimated that each individual had 8 cubic meters of air, "a quantity recognized as insufficient even for soldiers, all the more so for prisoners who, in relation to the air, must be treated as sick, at the rate of 16 cubic meters". The Ministry estimated that the fort housed 687 prisoners in 1847, however, the actual numbers recorded were 547, due to deaths and unreported releases. A cemetery was built to bury those who died on the island. The incarceration of these prisoners ended in 1856.

In 1859, after the Battle of Montebello, 600 Austrian prisoners were detained there.

Between 1817 and 1820, two hundred mamluks from Egypt are said to have been interned there.

The fort ceased operating as a prison during the 20th century. Some noted prisoners accommodated during its operation as a prison included: –

Inmate	Arrival	Departure	Details
Abd al-Qadir al-Jaza'iri	–	–	An Algerian rebel leader.
François Achille Bazaine	–	9/10 August 1874 (escaped)	The only successful escapee from the island.
Paul Cardel	18 April 1689	23 May 1694 (died in captivity)	A pastor in Rouen, he returned from Holland to France in 1688. On March 2nd, 1689, he was arrested at the bedside of a patient in Paris. He was one of the noted six Huguenots imprisoned for life. He was sent to Sainte-Marguerite Island on 18 April 1689, where he died on 23 May 1694, driven mad.
Jean Gardien Givry	16 August 1693	Unknown (died in captivity)	A pastor in Sedan, Montpellier, Nîmes, then Plymouth for 5 years. He returned to France in 1691 and held meetings, notably in Saint-Quentin, La Boîte à Cailloux and Château-Thierry. He was arrested after 7 months and then deported with Elisée Giraud. He was one of the noted six Huguenots imprisoned for life.
Elisée Giraud	16 August 1693	–	He travelled from England, to Holland, then to Paris, where he is imprisoned for two years in Vincennes. On 16 August 1693, he was transferred to Sainte-Marguerite Island. He was one of the noted six Huguenots imprisoned for life.
Marquis Jouffroy d’Abbans	–	–	Inventor of the steamboat.
Mathieu de Malzac	1692	15 February 1725 (died in captivity)	A pastor at La Bastide (Bas-Languedoc), then in Rotterdam in 1686. From 1689, he exercised his ministry between Paris and Lyon. He was arrested in 1692, and imprisoned on Sainte-Marguerite Island. He was one of the noted six Huguenots imprisoned for life. Pontchartrain, minister of Louis XIV, asked that he be treated with humanity, earning the prisoner the exceptional privilege of a 2-hour walk. He died in prison on 15 February 1725.
Gabriel Mathurin	18 April 1690	1715	A pastor in Arnhem (Holland) who was arrested in Paris on 18 April 1690 (aged 50). He was one of the noted six Huguenots imprisoned for life. He was imprisoned in Sainte-Marguerite and released in 1715.
Pierre de Salve (Lord of Bruneton)	15 January 1690	–	A pastor at the Walloon Church of Arenberg who left for Paris on "important business". He was arrested in Paris on 10 January 1690. He was one of the noted six Huguenots imprisoned for life. He was transferred to Sainte-Marguerite Island on 15 January 1690. His sermon included "It is for me to live and to die for Christ".
Jean-Baptiste-Antoine Suard	1751	1753	He would eventually become the eternal secretary of the French Academy.
Unknown (Man in the Iron Mask)	1687	1698	A mysterious prisoner whose identity remains unknown.

=== 20th-century adaptations ===
In 1862, Rocher Tower was raised to accommodate a semaphore to send telegraphs. During the occupation by German troops during the Second World War, a surveillance station was established on one of the fort's triangular promontories.

=== Museum ===
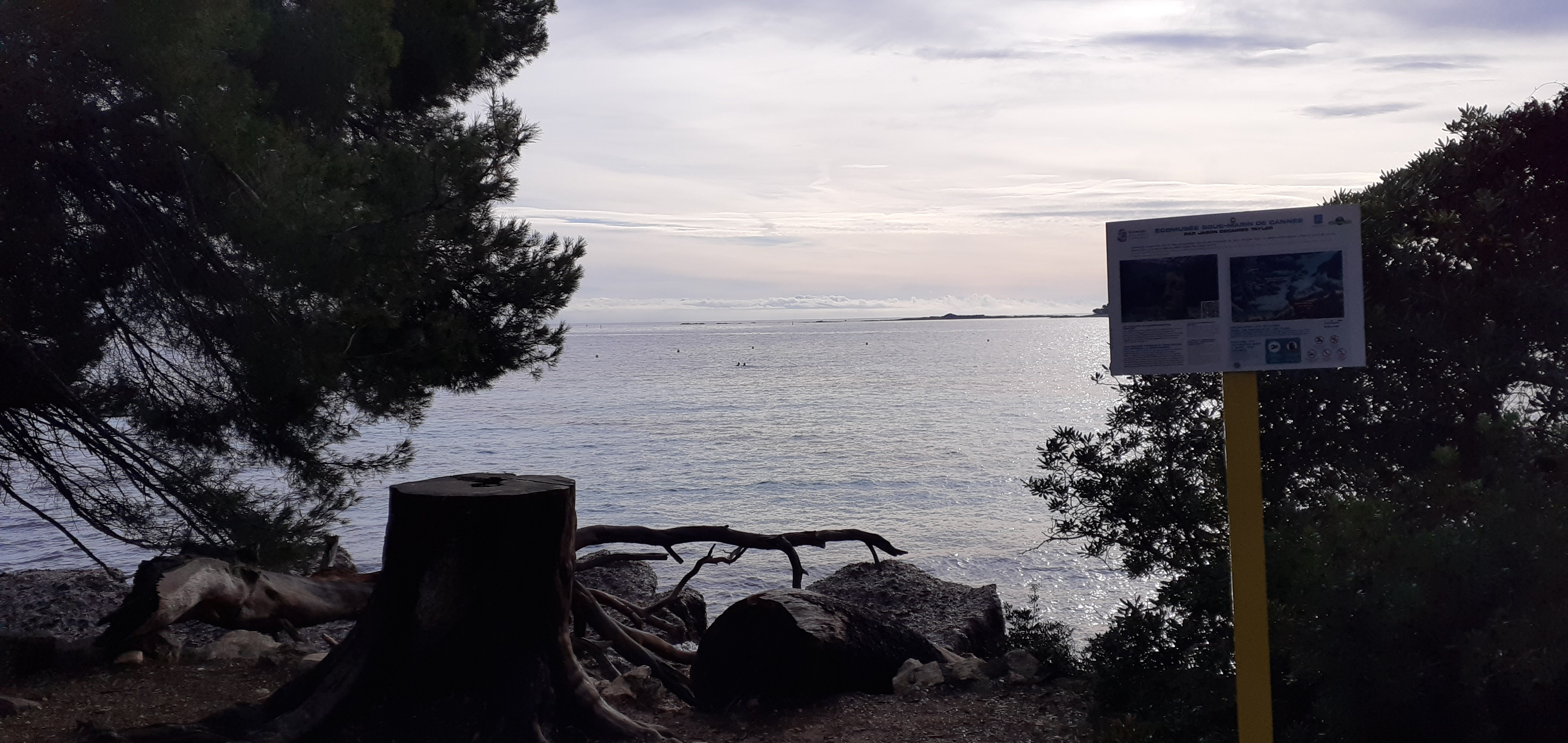
Immersion site of the sculptures (two free-divers directly above the site)

As well as accommodating a youth hostel, old part of the Royal Fort, the Roman and medieval cisterns, houses an archaeology museum exploring land and sea (Museum Reference No: 0602902; Identification Number: M0873) This official French museum was called the Museum of the Sea (French: "Musée de la Mer"), but changed its name from 2020 onwards to the Iron Mask and Royal Fort Museum (French: "Musée du Masque de fer et du Fort Royal") The museum is laid out around the former prison with the cell in which the Man in the Iron Mask was imprisoned, the Roman cisterns of the old castle and, upstairs, its collection of objects from Roman and Saracen shipwrecks, from the islands of Tradelière (French: Tradelière) and Batéguier, as well as Roman frescoes. The museum also presents explicative scale models and works of contemporary art. The museum's temporary exhibitions take place in summer on the vast terrace overlooking the sea:-

Year	Name	Significance
2005	"Cannes, White Lights”	Photographs Olivier Mériel
2006	"Cannes, Vibrato”	Photographs by Gilles Leimdorfer
2007	"The Royal Fort of Sainte-Marguerite Island in the 17th century"	Part of the tercentenary of the death of Vauban
2009	"Bellini, Colors of Water”	
2010	"Ella Maillart, A Life of Travels”	Collaborating with the Musée de l’Élysée, Lausanne.

Visitors are also able to view a number of former prison cells (including that occupied by the Man in the Iron Mask) and a Roman cistern room. The attendance statistics for the museum have been:

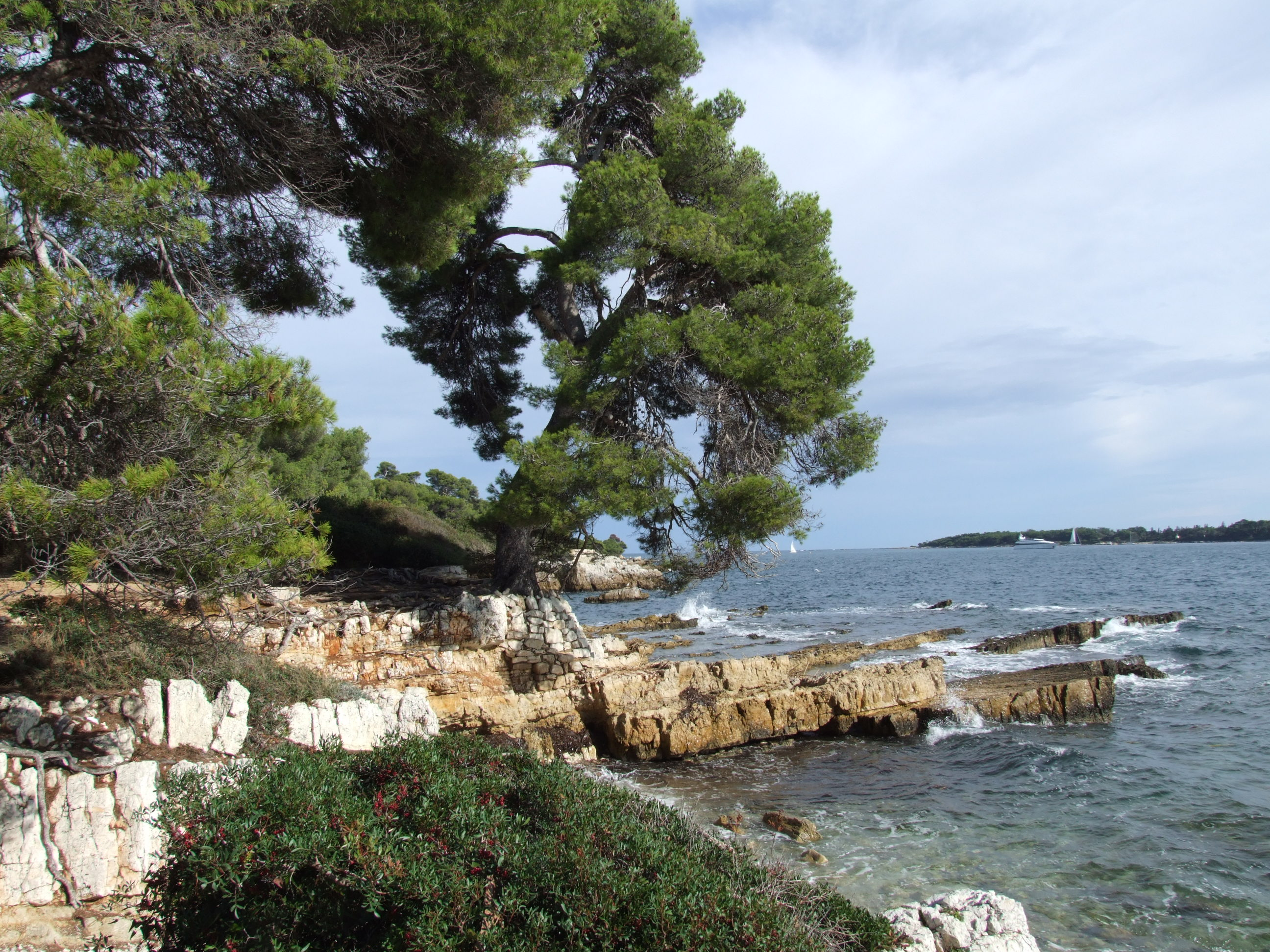
Sea side

Year	Free Entry	Paid Entry	Total
2001	20 657	37 752	58 409
2002	15 937	23 214	39 151
2003	19 945	15 684	35 629
2004	17 833	15 450	33 283
2005	28 622	40 429	69 051
2006	34 022	42 511	76 533
2007	36 301	50 334	86 635
2008	39 239	47 942	87 181
2009	35 821	48 638	84 459
2010	37 904	44 377	82 281
2011	35 752	47 064	82 816
2012	36 718	43 317	80 035
2013	35 981	44 519	80 500
2014	38 898	47 990	86 888
2015	37 823	45 059	82 882
2016	35 794	41 654	77 448
2017	34 837	45 690	80 527
2018	41,397	33,508	74,905
2019	43,900	34,493	78,393
2020^{†}	42,627	17,549	42,176
2021	30,399	22,030	52,429

† – The first year the museum was known as the Iron Mask and Royal Fort Museum

== Village ==
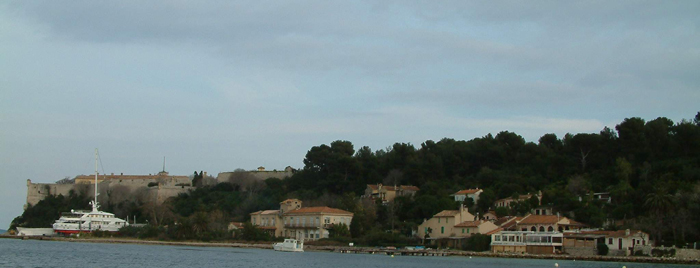
The Royal Fort and the village on the island's north side.

During the 18th century, the present-day village of Sainte-Marguerite developed, thriving on the spending power of the soldiers stationed on the island.

The village of Sainte-Marguerite is made up of about twenty buildings. Most of these are home to fishermen, but there is also a small boatyard and one or two establishments offering refreshments to tourists. The island's hotel has been closed down since the summer of 2005.

== Cemetery ==
Close to the Fort Royal is a small cemetery for French soldiers who died there when it was used for convalescence during the Crimean War, and alongside it is a cemetery for North African soldiers killed on the Allied side during World War II.

== The Great Garden ==
"The Great Garden" (French: "Le Grand Jardin") is a 1.3 hectare piece of luxury real estate on Sainte-Marguerite Island. The estate is protected by a wall built on the orders of Cardinal de Richelieu. All the buildings are said to have been built between the 12th century and 17th century and the estate has been the refuge of famous owners, the monks of Lérins, the King of France (Louis XIV), the Duke of Guise or the Governor of Provence; but also the mayor of Marseilles, after the French Revolution.

The property belonged in 1840 to the Cannes resident Jean-François Tournaire; in 1889 to Paul Jubelin, doctor of the Navy; then to Félix Sue, owner of the lime kilns of Rocheville. This last occupant sold it in 1928 to the Danish sculptor Viggo Jarl who remained the owner until the sale of the estate, for 5 million francs, in 1982, to a promoter from Cannes, Claude Muller. On 16 September 2008, it was announced that Claude Muller had sold it to Vijay Mallya, an Indian businessman, for between €37 and €43 million ($53–61 million US), through his Luxemburg company Gizmo Invest SA, a company ultimately owned by Mallya, using a 27-million euro ($30 million) loan facility from Ansbacher & Co (a unit of Qatar National Bank SAQ) on 15 February 2017, with a €5 million mortgage on his Mangusta 165 yacht as additional security. Gizmo defaulted on the loan. By September 2015, when the loan was due and Mallya was facing a $100 million lawsuit from Diageo Plc and $1.2 billion lawsuit from a consortium of Indian banks led by the State Bank of India, including Bank of Baroda, Corporation Bank, Federal Bank Ltd, Jammu and Kashmir Bank, State Bank of Mysore, United Bank of India etc, that lent money to Mallya's Kingfisher Airlines before the carrier's collapse in 2012 in lieu of the loans granted to the airline. The estate was described by Gideon Shirazi, one of the bank's lawyers suing him for unpaid debts, as having "fallen into disrepair" and that unsuitable interior designers and builders engaged to carry out repairs at the property (still incomplete by January 2018) had left it in a worse state. During a request to extend the defaulted loan, the property was evaluated by real estate agent Knight Frank who found that the value had fallen by 10 millions euros, to 30 million euros. The property was sold for 2.9 million sale, and the proceeds and other assets were held within the United Kingdom Court Funds Office during the bankruptcy proceedings.

The estate currently includes 17 bedrooms, a swimming pool, gym, sauna and steam room, private cinema, night club, large wine cellar, a private helipad, staff quarters and rooftop terrace with panoramic views of the Mediterranean.

== Wildlife ==
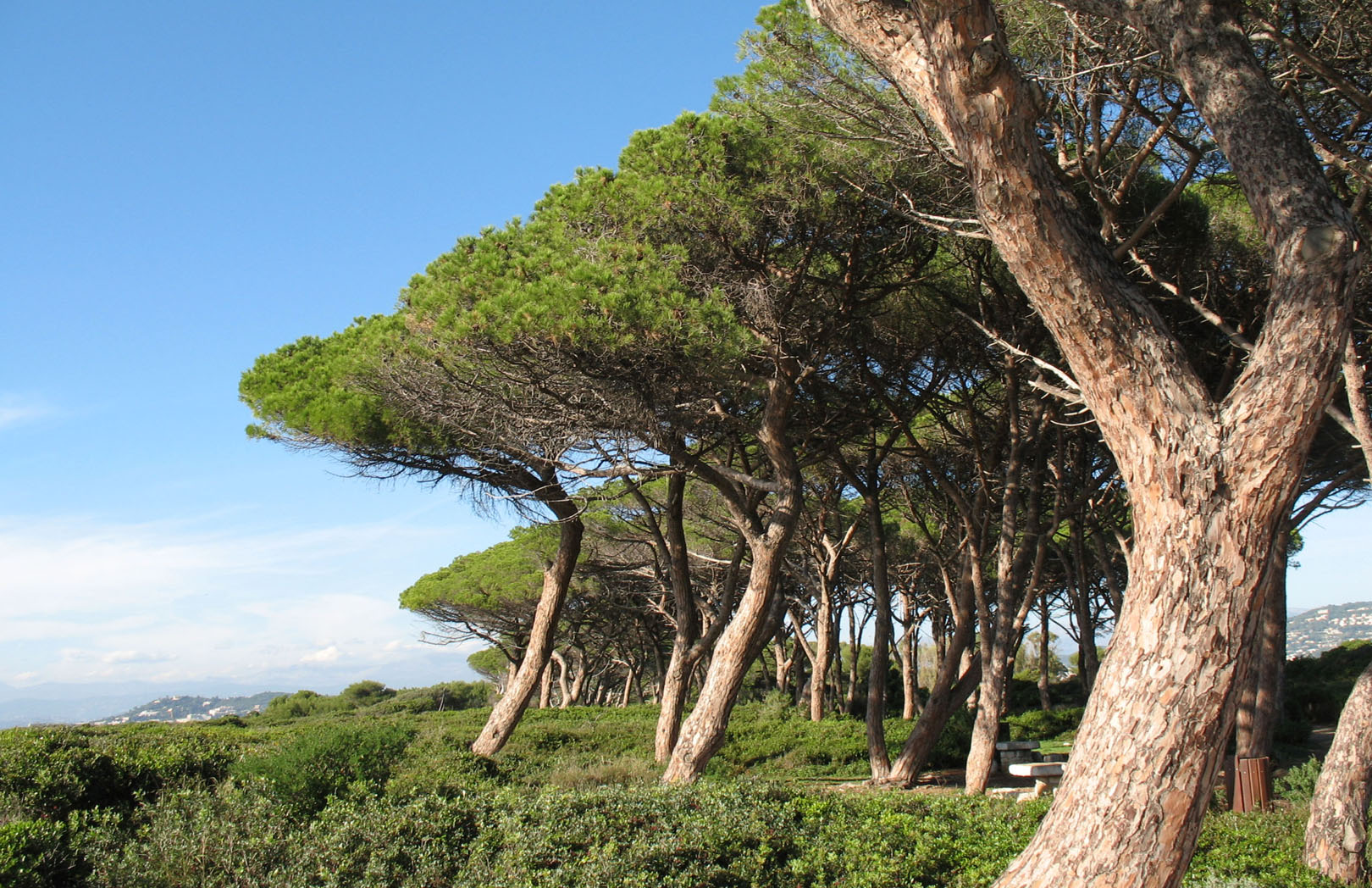
Pines on Sainte-Marguerite Island

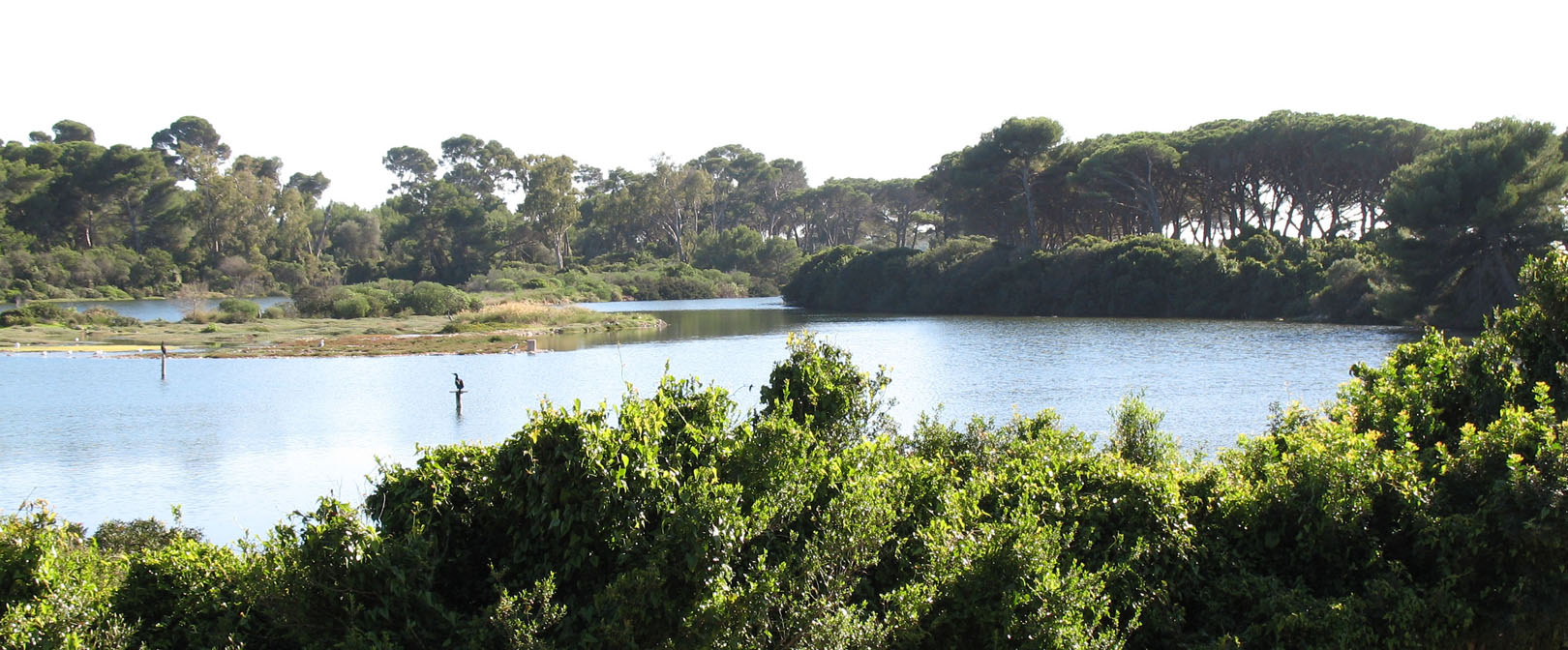
Bateguier pond

The island is low in profile and heavily wooded with umbrella pines and eucalyptus. This insland and Saint-Honorat Island) are looked after by France's National Office of Forests (French: "Office national des forêts"), and are a popular tourist attraction of natural interest.

The island has a unique variety of plant species. The flauna and flora areas of note are:-

- Allee des Eucalyptus – An area lined with eucalyptus trees.
- Bateguier pond – An artificial pond home to numerous specious of migratory birds.
- Point de la Convention – Featuring the island flora.

== Tourism ==
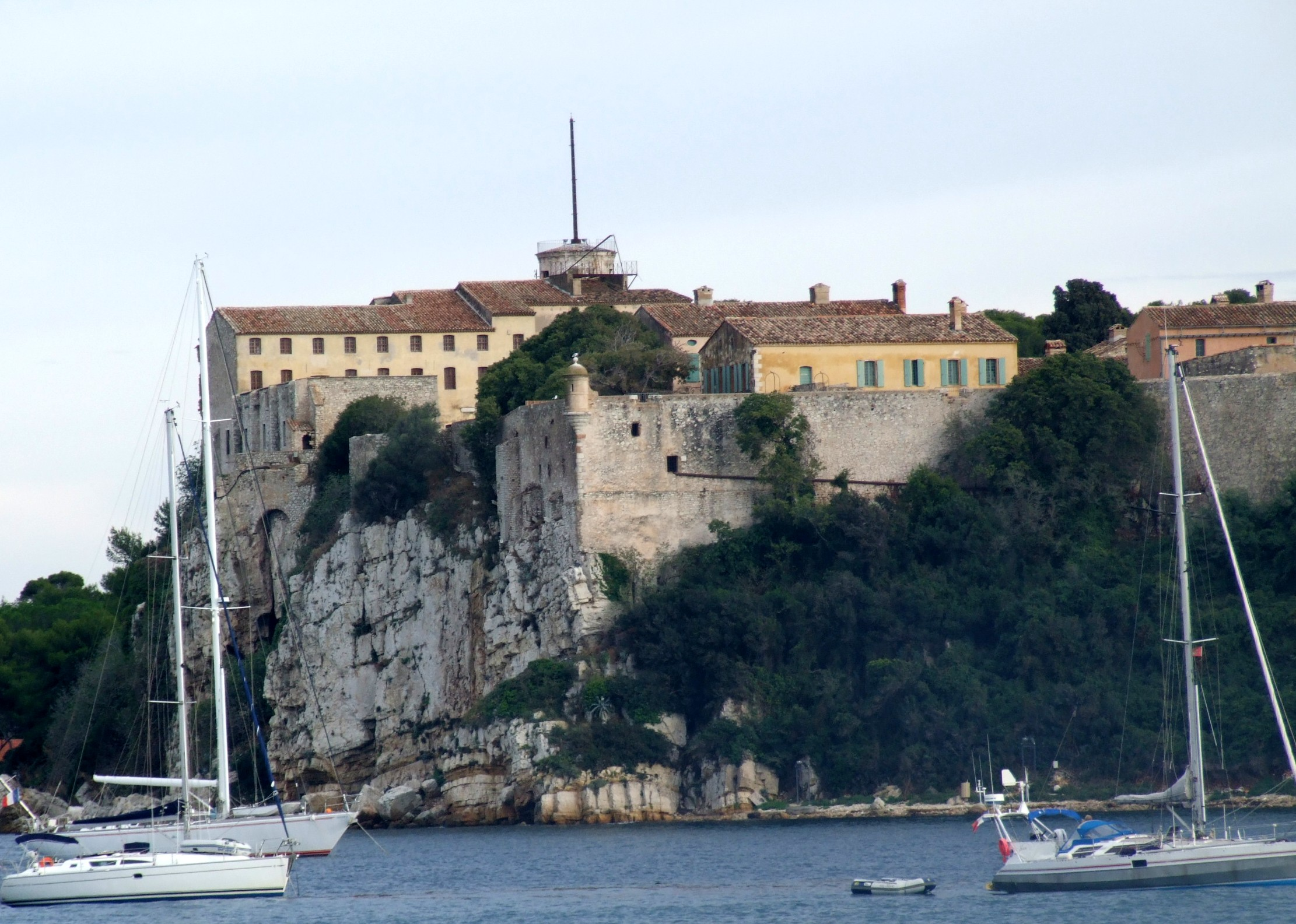
Yachts moored off the Island.

A commercial ferry service between the Vieux-Port of Cannes and the Lérins Islands provides daily crossings all year round.

During the summer months, a large number of boats moor in the shallow, protected "Plateau du Milieu", between the islands or on the landward side of Sainte-Marguerite island where there is more room for water skiing, parascending and other popular water sports.
