= Tyndall's Park =

Coordinates: 51.46°N 2.6°W

Tyndalls Park
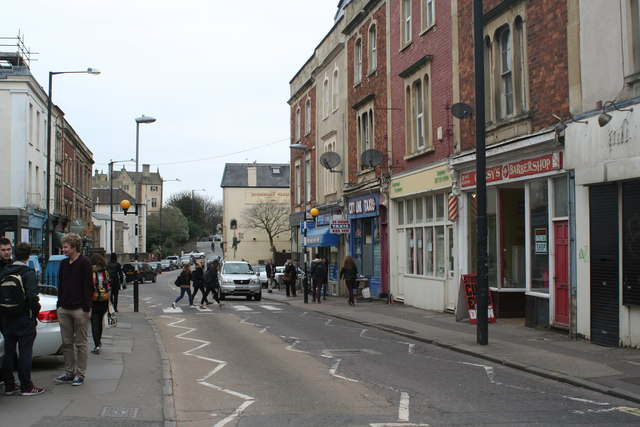
- Shops in St Michaels Hill

- Location within Bristol
- OS grid reference: ST584731
- Unitary authority: Bristol
- Region: South West
- Country: England
- Sovereign state: United Kingdom
- Post town: BRISTOL
- Postcode district: BS8
- Dialling code: 0117
- Police: Avon and Somerset
- Fire: Avon
- Ambulance: South Western
- UK Parliament: Bristol Central

Tyndall's Park is an area of central Bristol, England. It lies north of Park Row and Queen's Road, east of Whiteladies Road and west of St Michael's Hill, between the districts of Clifton, Cotham and Kingsdown. It includes the campus of Bristol Grammar School, and many of the buildings of the University of Bristol.

The area is named after Thomas Tyndall, a Bristol merchant and investor in the slave trade, who between 1753 and 1767 bought a number of fields which then existed in the area and turned them into an ornamental park. He built a stately house on the crest of the hill, on the site of a Civil War fortification, and named it Fort Royal (now known as Royal Fort House). In 1799 Tyndall's son Colonel Thomas Tyndall employed Humphrey Repton to landscape the gardens.

In 1825 and 1833, two roads (Aberdeen Road and West Park) were built in the north western corner of the park, and developed for housing. In 1852 the Tyndalls began selling off the remainder of the western half of the park for development, and in 1877 5 acres (20,000 m^{2}) were sold for a new building for Bristol Grammar School. From 1880, more land was sold to University College, Bristol. The Royal Fort was occupied by members of the Tyndall family until 1916, when Henry Herbert Wills bought it and gave it to the University.
