= Official Solicitor =

Law Officer of the United Kingdom

In the United Kingdom and Hong Kong, the Official Solicitor is a public officer who acts for people who, because they lack mental capacity and cannot properly manage their own affairs, are unable to represent themselves and no other suitable person or agency is able or willing to act.

Historically, states have recognised the need for representation of an incapacitated person when a benevolent relative or friend cannot be found to act on his behalf, this is the function of the Office of the Official Solicitor. The Official Solicitor becomes formally involved when appointed by the Court, and she can act as her own solicitor, or instruct a private firm of solicitors to represent her. The Official Solicitor has two main functions. Firstly, in England and Wales, her main function is to represent children and adults who are incapable of representing themselves in various courts, including the Court of Protection. She also acts as last resort personal representative for the estate of a deceased person, or trustee of a trust. Secondly, in the area of international child protection obligations to which the UK government is a signatory, the Official Solicitor deals with cases brought under the Hague Convention on the Civil Aspects of International Child Abduction through the International Child Abduction and Contact Unit (ICACU). In this capacity she deals with international child abduction and contact issues and handles maintenance enforcement in cases where one parent lives outside the UK through the Reciprocal Enforcement of Maintenance Orders Unit (REMO).

== United Kingdom ==
=== Background and history ===
The Office of the Official Solicitor is a part of the Ministry of Justice of the Government of the United Kingdom. The Official Solicitor acts for England and Wales only, as Scotland and Northern Ireland have separate legal systems and judiciaries.

The development of the functions of the Official Solicitor can be traced back to the 18th century when the Office of the Six Clerks, which is mentioned in Samuel Pepys’ Diary, assisted destitute litigants, lunatics and infants in Chancery suits and this form of support continued until the modern system of legal funding came into effect. In 1842, the Office of the Six Clerks was abolished by the Court of Chancery Act and John Johnson was appointed Solicitor to the Suitors’ Fund by the Lord Chancellor to represent ‘paupers, infants and lunatics’ where there was no ‘natural protector’. By an order dated 4 December 1871, Lord Chancellor Hatherley appointed Henry Pemberton to be the Official Solicitor to the High Court of Chancery in England and directed him to perform the duties formerly carried out by the Solicitor to the Suitors' Fund, although by 1875 the original duties of the office of Solicitor to the Suitors' Fund had largely disappeared. The present office was created by an Order of the Lord Chancellor made on the 6 November 1875 with the approval of the Presidents of the newly constituted divisions of the High Court and of the Treasury, under the power given to him by Section 84 of the Supreme Court of Judicature Act 1873 to appoint officers to serve the Supreme Court generally. Lord Chancellor Cairns by an order dated 7 February 1876 then appointed Henry Pemberton to be The Official Solicitor to the Supreme Court of Judicature.

Episodes in which the Official Solicitor has intervened have generally arisen when there has been a legal stalemate. In 1921 the Official Solicitor intervened to arrange the release from prison of a female Labour councillor from Poplar who had been imprisoned along with most of the members of Poplar Borough Council, for having refused to raise the rates, arguing that the poor inhabitants of Poplar could not afford to pay any more. In 1972 the Official Solicitor, Norman Turner, broke a legal stalemate between the Trades Union Congress and the government known as the Pentonville Five case, in which five shop stewards from the dockers' union were imprisoned on a charge of contempt. The Official Solicitor was also called upon by the Secretary of State for the Department of Trade and Industry to deal with the issue of pirate radio broadcasting by Radio Caroline.

The present legal basis of the Office of the Official Solicitor dates from 1981 when, under s.90 of the Supreme Court Act 1981, that the Official Solicitor became a statutory officer of the then-Supreme Court of England and Wales appointed by the Lord Chancellor under the name of Official Solicitor to the Supreme Court. The offices of the Official Solicitor to the Senior Courts and the Public Trustee are now housed in one office building, but they continue to have separate functions. On 1 April 2007 the Official Solicitor and Public Trustee merged with the Court Funds Office to become the Offices of Court Funds, Official Solicitor and Public Trustee. This new organisation was an associated office of the Ministry of Justice. They were split up again on 1 April 2009. The new Supreme Court of the United Kingdom was established under the Constitutional Reform Act 2005 and came into effect in October 2009, separating the judicial and law-making functions of the House of Lords for the first time. In October 2009, the 12 Law Lords who hear appeals in Parliament became the first Justices of the Supreme Court. At the same time, the Supreme Court of England and Wales is renamed the Senior Courts of England and Wales, and the Official Solicitor to the Supreme Court became the Official Solicitor to the Senior Courts.

=== International Child Abduction and Contact Unit ===
The International Child Abduction and Contact Unit (ICACU) is the section of the Office of the Official Solicitor that is the Central Authority of England and Wales for international child abduction and contact issues under the terms of the Hague Convention on the Civil Aspects of International Child Abduction and the European Convention on Recognition and Enforcement of Decisions Concerning Custody of Children and on Restoration of Custody of Children.

== Hong Kong ==
The Hong Kong Official Solicitor's Office is a separate office under the Director of Legal Aid. The office was created in 1991 by the Official Solicitor Ordinance in 1991, and has similar functions to its English counterpart. The Official Solicitor took up some of the duties of the Registrar General and the Law Officer (Civil Law) upon the establishment of the position.

== External sources ==
- Office of the Official Solicitor official website
