= Pentonville Five =

Group of British trade union shop stewards imprisoned in 1972

The Pentonville Five were five shop stewards who were imprisoned in July 1972 by the National Industrial Relations Court for refusing to obey a court order to stop picketing a container depot in East London. Their arrest and imprisonment led to the Trades Union Congress (TUC) calling a general strike.

== Injunction ==
The events took place against the background of a clash between the Conservative government of Edward Heath and the trade union movement, involving the first national miners’ strike in Britain since 1926, with mass picketing, and clashes between police and workers.

Dockers at the Chobham Farm container depot, Temple Mills, Newham, were unofficially striking and picketing the site.

The National Industrial Relations Court (NIRC) had issued an injunction barring further picketing, following an application by Midland Cold Storage Company.

== Arrest ==
Picketing continued despite the injunction. Five shop stewards were named by private investigators for the cold storage company – Conny Clancy, Tony Merrick, Bernie Steer, Vic Turner and Derek Watkins. Warrants were issued by the court for their arrest for contempt of court, and they were imprisoned on 21 July 1972.

== Protests ==
Following their arrest, a rolling series of strikes began to cause work stoppages until there was virtually an unofficial national strike.

The Trades Union Congress (TUC) then called for an official national strike on 31 July, demanding the release of the five shop stewards.

Thousands of striking workers marched through North London to Pentonville Prison.

== Release ==
The "Five" were released within a week of their arrest when the Official Solicitor Norman Turner, on receipt of the papers, successfully applied to the Court of Appeal. The Official Solicitor is a court official who represents those who are unable to represent their own interests. For this case, he was assisted in the Court of Appeal by barrister John Vinelott, later a High Court judge. The Official Solicitor was successful in his application to overturn the arrest warrants, on the grounds that the National Industrial Relations Court had insufficient grounds to deprive them of their liberty and that the evidence of the private investigators was insufficient.

== Legacy ==
Vic Turner continued to work in the docks, transferring from the Royal Docks to Tilbury. However he left the docks under the voluntary redundancy scheme and started working for Newham London Borough Council. He was then elected a councillor and served for many years before being elected mayor. During this period he was also presented with the Transport and General Union Gold Medal for his work for the union.

=== Deaths ===
- Vic Turner died on 30 December 2012, at the age of 85.
- Cornelius "Conny" Clancy died in Hackney in 2016, at the age of 70.
- Tony Merrick died in August 2020, at the age of 83.
- Derek Watkins later suffered from Parkinson's disease and died on 21 August 2021, at the age of 83.
- Bernie Steer died on 21 July 2022, at the age of 83. He was the last surviving member of the group.

== Film ==
The radical film group Cinema Action made a documentary called Arise Ye Workers during the struggle, which was released in 1973. The film won the Silver Dove at the Leipzig Film Festival and was screened by the jailed dockers on the anniversary of their release from jail.
