= Bristol in the English Civil War =

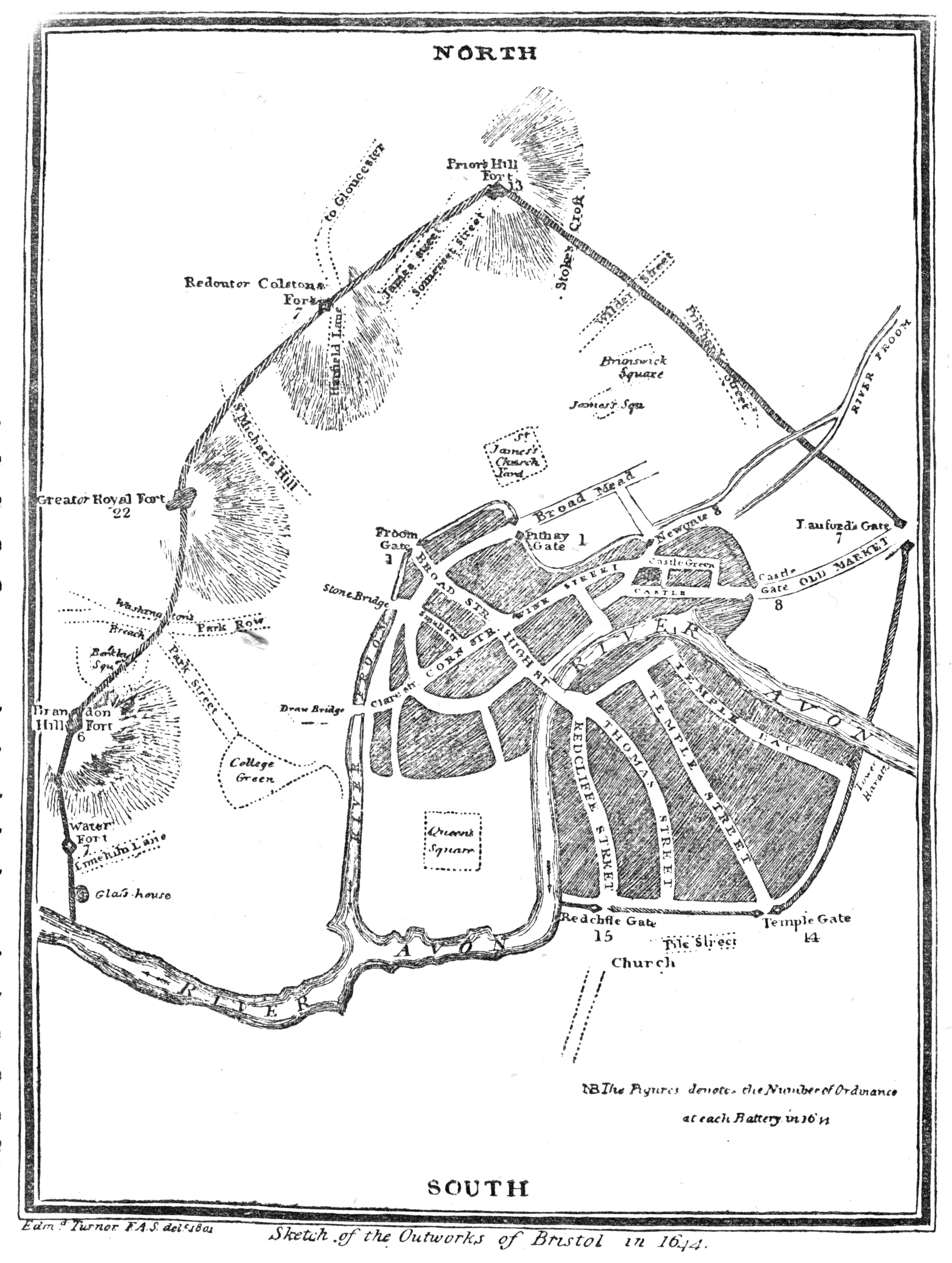
Map of the fortifications in 1644

During the English Civil War (1642–1651), Bristol was a key port on the west coast of England and considered strategically important by both Royalists and Parliamentarians. Initially, the leadership of Bristol wanted to keep the city neutral in the conflict. In 1642, city officials implored Thomas Essex not to occupy the city with his Parliamentarian forces. The city was weakly defended, and Essex entered without much resistance. During the conflict, Bristol was used as a receiving point for the Royalists to accept reinforcements from Ireland. The town was well fortified by the Frome and Avon rivers, as well as a medieval castle, which had been bought by the corporation when the First English Civil War broke out in 1642, and during the Parliamentary defense, earthen artillery forts.

In these years, Bristol failed to play the important role that might have been expected from a large and rich port. However, the populace had no relish for a civil war in which men were fighting for reasons which did not fill most citizens of Bristol with any great enthusiasm.

Royal Fort House was built on the site of two bastions on the inside of the lines and three on the outside which were fought over during the English Civil War. It was the strongest part of the defenses of Bristol, designed by Dutch military engineer Sir Bernard de Gomme. It was one of the few purpose-built defensive works of the war era. The fort was designed as the western headquarters of the Royalist army under Prince Rupert. It was demolished in 1655.

For Bristol, the central event of the war was the Storming of Bristol by Royalist forces in 1643. The Royalist suffered heavy casualties taking the city, especially among regimental and brigade commanders. After the capture, the city became an important Royalist supply base, and center for communication, administration, and manufacture. The Royalists were dependent on foreign aid and the importation of weaponry. Ships laden with ordnance had to evade Parliamentarian patrols in order to offload their cargo at Bristol.

A typical myth about Bristol during the civil war concerns its capture by Prince Rupert in July 1643. Traditionally it has been accepted that Bristol was attacked by a Royalist army of up to 20,000 men and that William Waller had irresponsibly reduced the garrison to 1,500 infantry and 300 mounted troops, insufficient to man the defensive lines surrounding the city. It is further accepted that these defenses were inadequate and that their weakness was compounded by a serious shortage of ammunition. Despite these problems, the Royalists breached the defenses by the chance of discovery of a weak point unknown to the defenders. Once the line was breached, the city was indefensible and the garrison commander, Nathaniel Fiennes, surrendered the city to save his troops and civilian populations; although this account was shown to be inaccurate shortly after the event, it has retained some credibility.

The following are the major events in Bristol or events effecting Bristol during the English Civil War.

== 1642 ==
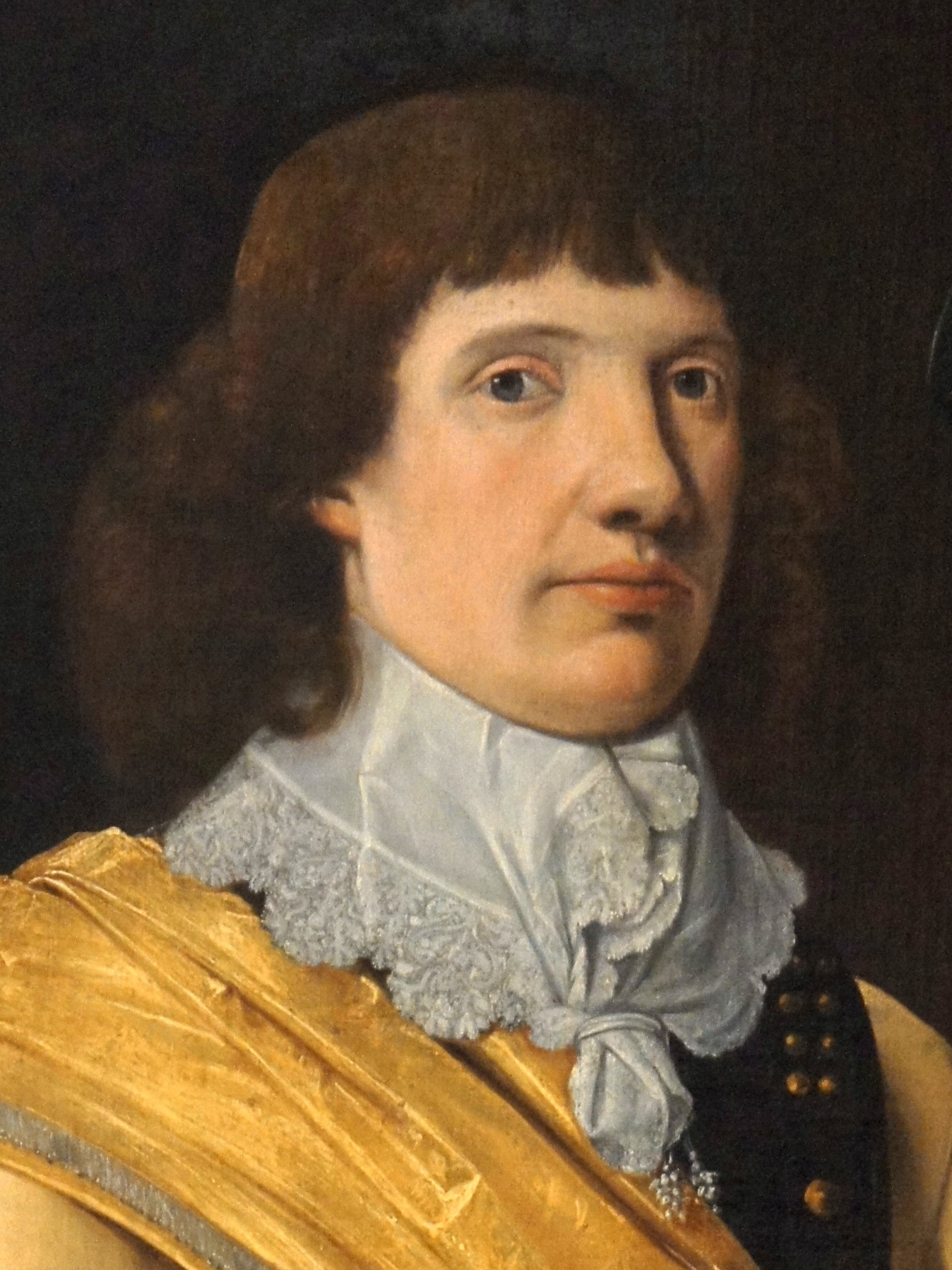
Nathaniel Fiennes.

- February, Sir Baynham Throckmorton bore a message from the King to the Common-council of Bristol.
- February, Cannon sent by the Mayor to Marlborough against the King.
- July, Marquis Hertford arrives in Somerset.
- September, Aldworth elected Mayor.
- 23 October, the Battle of Edgehill.
- 2 December, Colonel Thomas Essex's two Parliamentary regiments admitted into Bristol.
- A dispatch from Bristol, dated 10 December, informed Parliament that Colonel Essex with 2,000 men was then in the city; whereupon a letter was ordered to be sent to the citizens to encourage them to go on in its defense.

== 1643 ==
- 7 January, Petition for peace presented to the King.
- 27 February, Colonel Nathaniel Fiennes succeeded Colonel Essex as the Parliamentary military Governor.
- April, Supplies sent from Bristol to the Protestants in Ireland.
- March, The King's Proclamation concerning the Navy sent to Bristol.
- 30 May, The execution of Robert Yeamans and George Boucher for their part in a plot to secretly let in Royalist forces.
- 26 July, Bristol stormed by Prince Rupert (Fiennes stated in a statement to the House of Commons that this did not happen until 5 August). Rupert's force consisted of some 15,000 men, to face the 2,000 Parliamentarian defenders under Fiennes. In addition to "regular" soldiers, several hundred citizens of Bristol volunteered to defend the city. The Royalist suffered heavy casualties in the storming of the artillery fort, losing as much as a third of their army. Although Royalist losses were heavy, Fiennes surrendered quickly after the defenses of the city were breached. The Royalist forces captured plundered the city, and also captured eight armed merchant vessels which became the nucleus of the Royalist fleet. Workshops in the city became arms factories, providing muskets for the Royalist army.
- Fiennes surrendered to Rupert. For this, he was court-martialled, convicted, and sentenced to death. His accusers in the Parliamentarian command claimed that his surrender of the city was unnecessary. He was reprieved by the Earl of Essex.
- After the fall of Bristol, the King moved his naval forces from ports in south Cornwall, to Bristol. The Force consisted of 18 armed vessels, and was under the command of Sir John Pennington. The force was poorly trained and equipped, and many crews soon defected to the Parliamentarians.

== 1644 ==
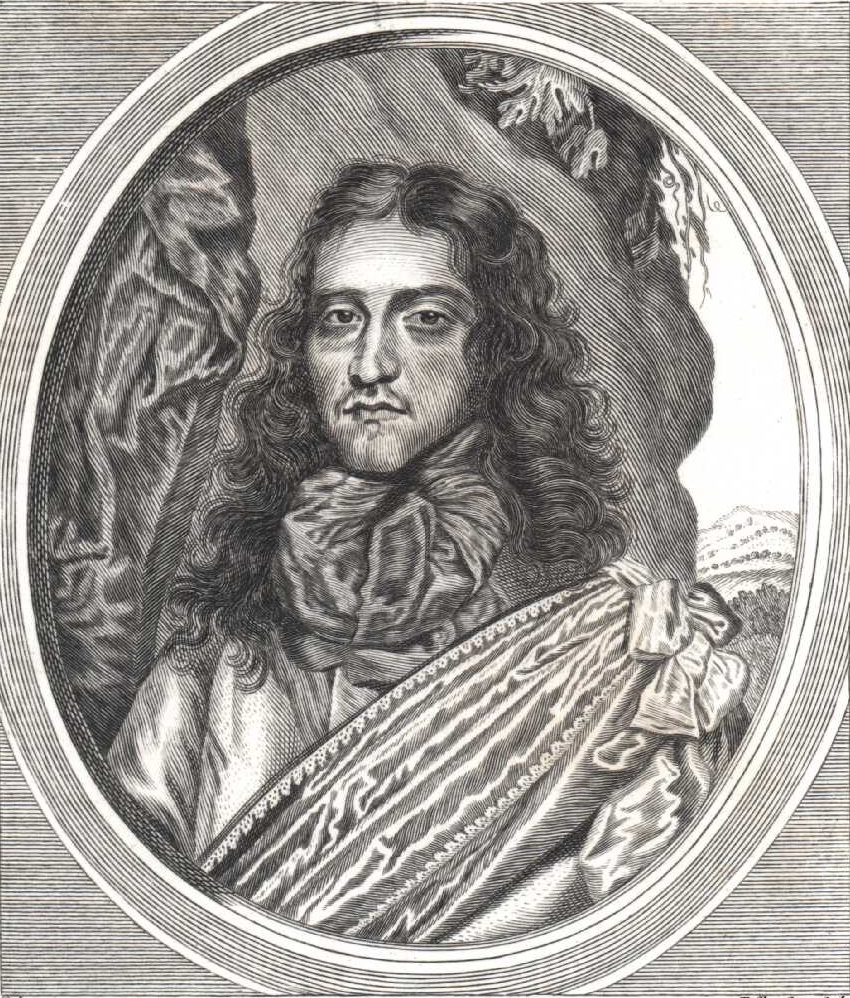
Prince Rupert.

- 5 January, The Association of Devon and Cornwall printed in Bristol by the King's Printer.
- About the end of January, a body of about 1,500 Irish soldiers under the command of Lord Inchiquin and the "Great O'Niel", disembarked at Bristol for service in the royal army.
- December, the construction of the Royal Fort was at length completed, to the great relief of the laboring population that had been driven in to build it.

== 1645 ==
In the summer of 1645, Royalist forces were defeated by the New Model Army at the Battle of Langport, in Somerset. Following further victories at Bridgwater and Sherborne, Sir Thomas Fairfax marched on Bristol. Prince Rupert returned to organise the defence of the city. The Parliamentary forces besieged the city and after three weeks attacked, eventually forcing Rupert to surrender on 10 September.

- 11 September, City surrendered to General Thomas Fairfax, after the conclusion of the second Siege of Bristol.
- September Rupert reports this to Charles and leaves England in disgrace.
- 7 January, the Council ordered a reassessment of the citizens and in accordance with the King's requirements, increased the weekly rate for supporting the garrison from £100 to £150, but discontinued the tax for the fortifications
- Early in March 1645, the Prince of Wales, who although under fifteen years of age, had been appointed General of the Association of the four Western counties, arrives in Bristol, accompanied by Lord Capel, Sir Edward Hyde, Sir John Culpepper, and others, who had been nominated as his Council.
