= Royal Fort House =

Historic building in Bristol, England

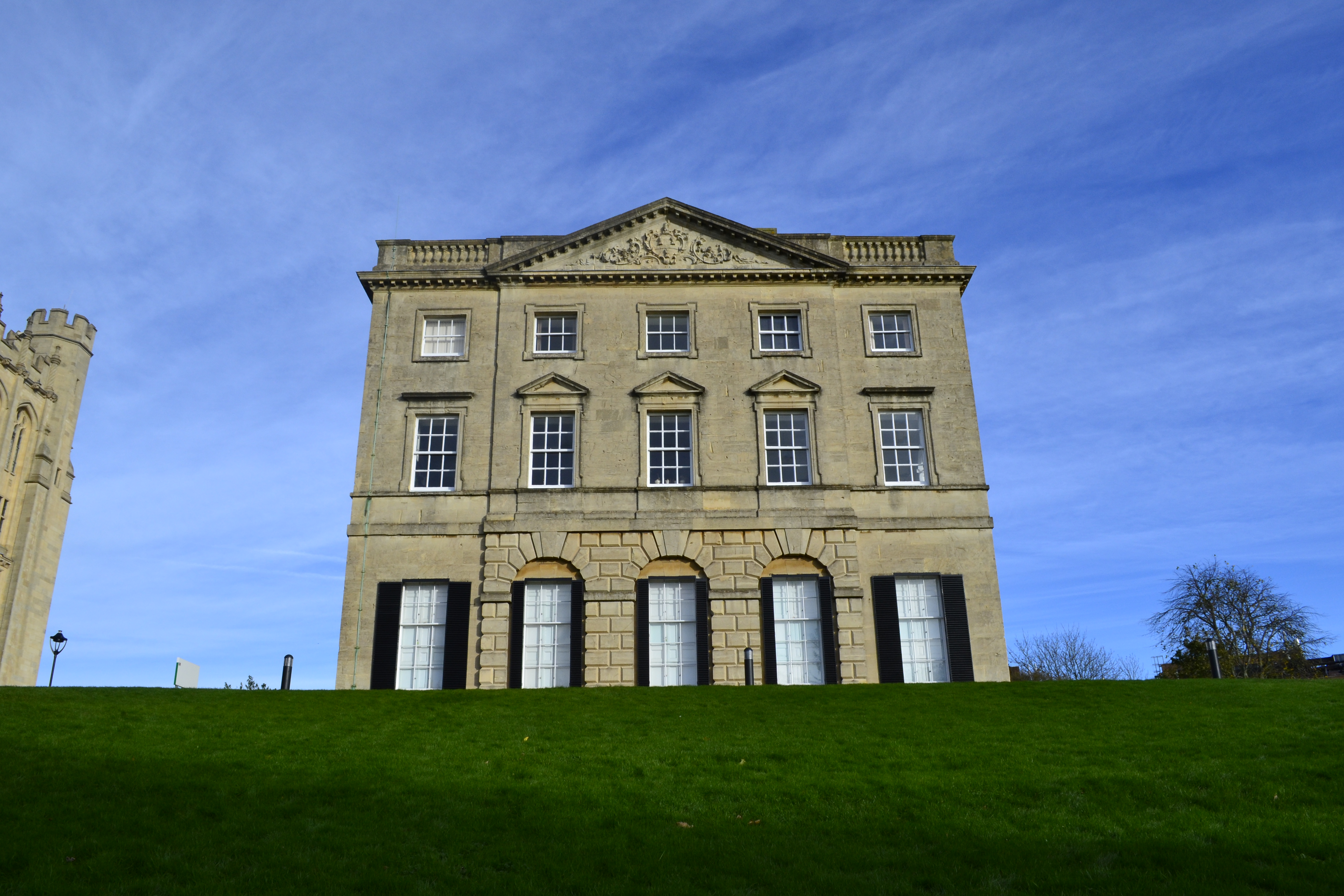

- Location within Bristol

General information
- Architectural style: Baroque, Palladian and Rococo
- Location: Bristol, England
- Coordinates: 51.4583°N 2.6035°W
- Construction started: 1758
- Completed: 1761
- Client: Thomas Tyndall

Design and construction
- Architect: James Bridges
- Engineer: Thomas Paty

The Royal Fort House is a historic house in Tyndall's Park, Bristol. The building currently houses the University of Bristol's Faculty of Science offices, the Brigstow Institute, Elizabeth Blackwell Institute for Health Research, the Cabot Institute and the Jean Golding Institute for data-intensive research.

The house was built for Thomas Tyndall KCB, in the 18th century, on the site of bastions which were fought over during the English Civil War and demolished in 1655. The Baroque, Palladian and Rococo styles of architecture are because of the work of three different architects: James Bridges, Thomas Paty, John Wallis. The garden was laid out by Humphry Repton around 1800.

== History ==
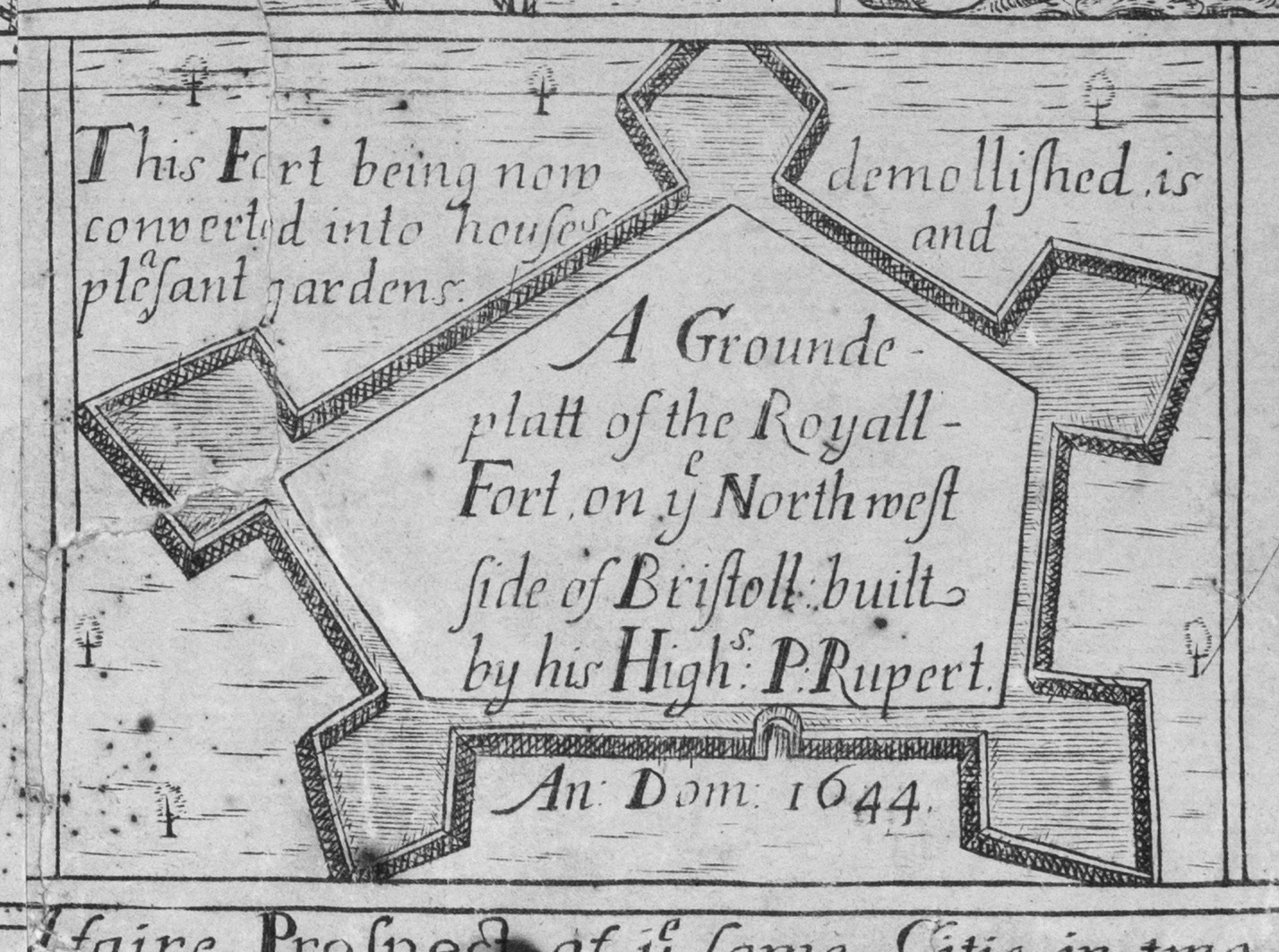
Ground Plan of the Royal Fort, Bristol, 1644

The house was constructed on the site of a Civil War fortification, which had two bastions on the inside of the lines and three on the outside. It was the strongest part of the defences of Bristol, designed by Dutch military engineer Sir Bernard de Gomme. It was one of the few purpose-built defensive works of the war era. The fort was designed as the western headquarters of the Royalist army under Prince Rupert. Royalists retreated into the fort when the Parliamentarians had broken through the lines in the siege of 1645, before eventually surrendering to Cromwell's forces.

The fort was demolished around 1655. The "Royal" in the name was in honour of Prince Rupert, when he was made Governor of Bristol. An archaeological investigation in 2009 discovered a defence ditch, two bastions and the possible foundations of a defensive wall on the summit of St Michaels' Hill.

== Design ==
The design of the mid-eighteenth-century house by James Bridges, for Thomas Tyndall KCB, was a compromise between the separate designs of architects Thomas Paty, John Wallis and himself. This led to different classical styles: Baroque, Palladian and Rococo, for three of the facades of the house. It was built between 1758 and 1761, by Thomas Paty with plasterwork by Thomas Stocking.

A later Colonel Thomas Tyndall employed Humphry Repton from 1799, to landscape the gardens which form a small part of Tyndall's Park, which extended to Whiteladies Road in the west, Park Row in the south and Cotham Hill to the north. Over the years large parts of the park were sold for housing development, as the site for the Bristol Grammar School, purchased in 1877, and only a small part of the original area remains, as Royal Fort Gardens. The siting of drives in the Royal Fort park is still reflected in street plans today.

The current stone gatehouse, built in the Victorian era and known as the Royal Fort Lodge, stands at the entrance to the driveway leading to Royal Fort House. It currently houses the University of Bristol security services.

The house has been designated by Historic England as a grade I listed building.

== Royal Fort Gardens ==
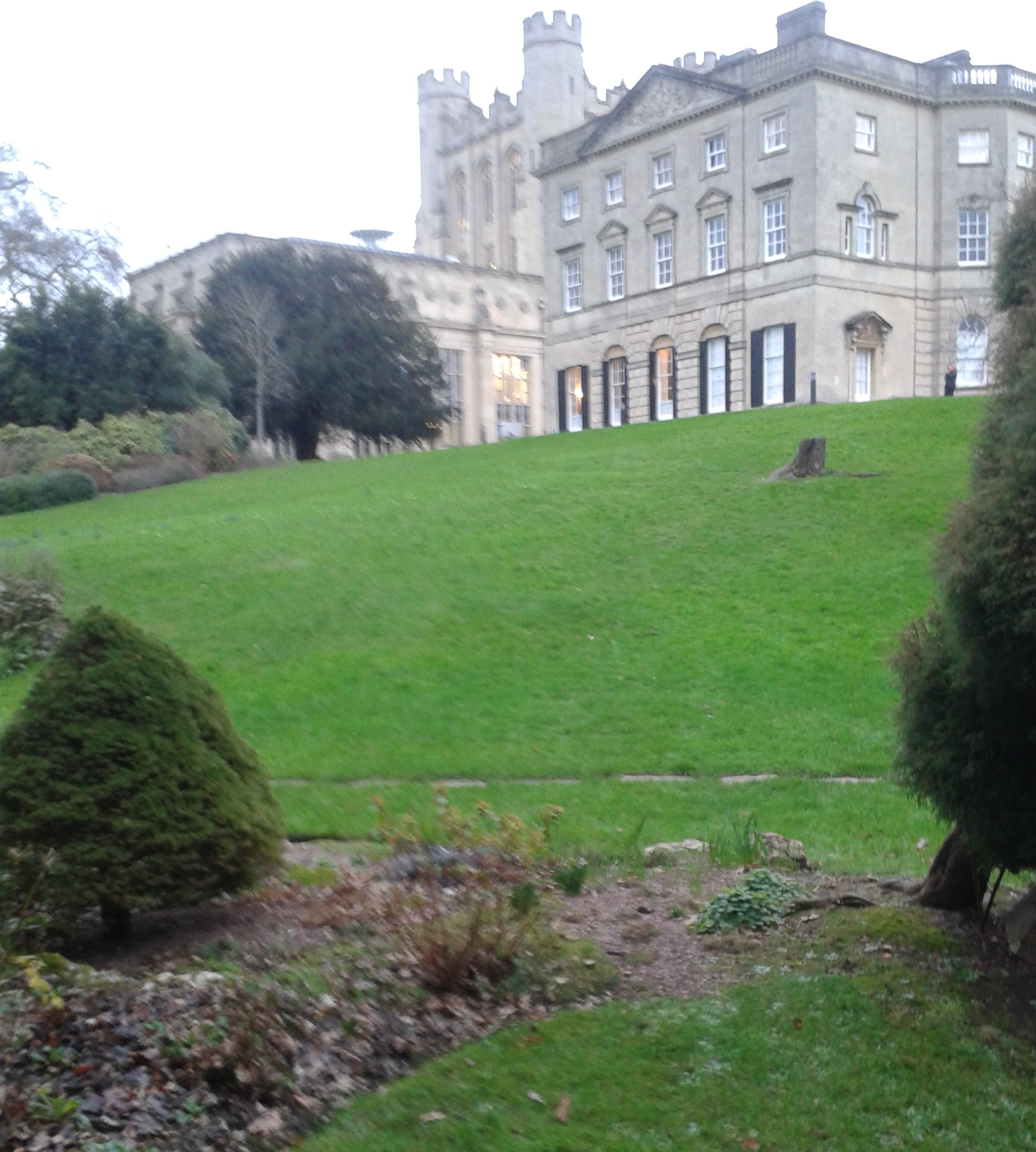
A view to the House from Royal Fort Gardens

Although owned by the University of Bristol, the Royal Fort Gardens are open to the public for the majority of the year. Following a failed attempt to develop the gardens for housing, at the end of the eighteenth century, renowned landscape architect Humphry Repton was commissioned to reinstate a garden in the 'English Landscape' fashion.

Repton produced a design which filled in the unsightly excavations; created an undulating lawn and screened the undesirable - or framed the desirable - views. A high wall surrounds and retains the garden. This would have acted as a 'ha-ha' to gain what, at the time, would have been unspoiled vistas.

The garden is now widely used for student activities and general relaxing. It contains a small pond, trees and habitats, to increase the biodiversity, and visitors can also appreciate a mirror maze (called Follow Me) designed by the artist Jeppe Hein. In 2016 a new art installation called Hollow was produced by Katie Paterson, with the assistance of Zeller & Moye. Hollow brings together samples taken from 10,000 species of tree which grow throughout the world.

== Ownership ==
It is now owned by the University of Bristol, who were given the estate as a gift by Henry Herbert Wills of the Bristol tobacco company W. D. & H. O. Wills. For many years it housed the university's Music Department (which in 1996 moved to the Victoria Rooms), then became a conference and banqueting venue, and now houses the university's Faculty of Science, the Elizabeth Blackwell Institute for Health Research, Brisgstow Institute, Jean Golding Institute for data-intensive research and the Cabot Institute for the Environment.
