= Thomas Tyndall =

Bristol merchant and banker

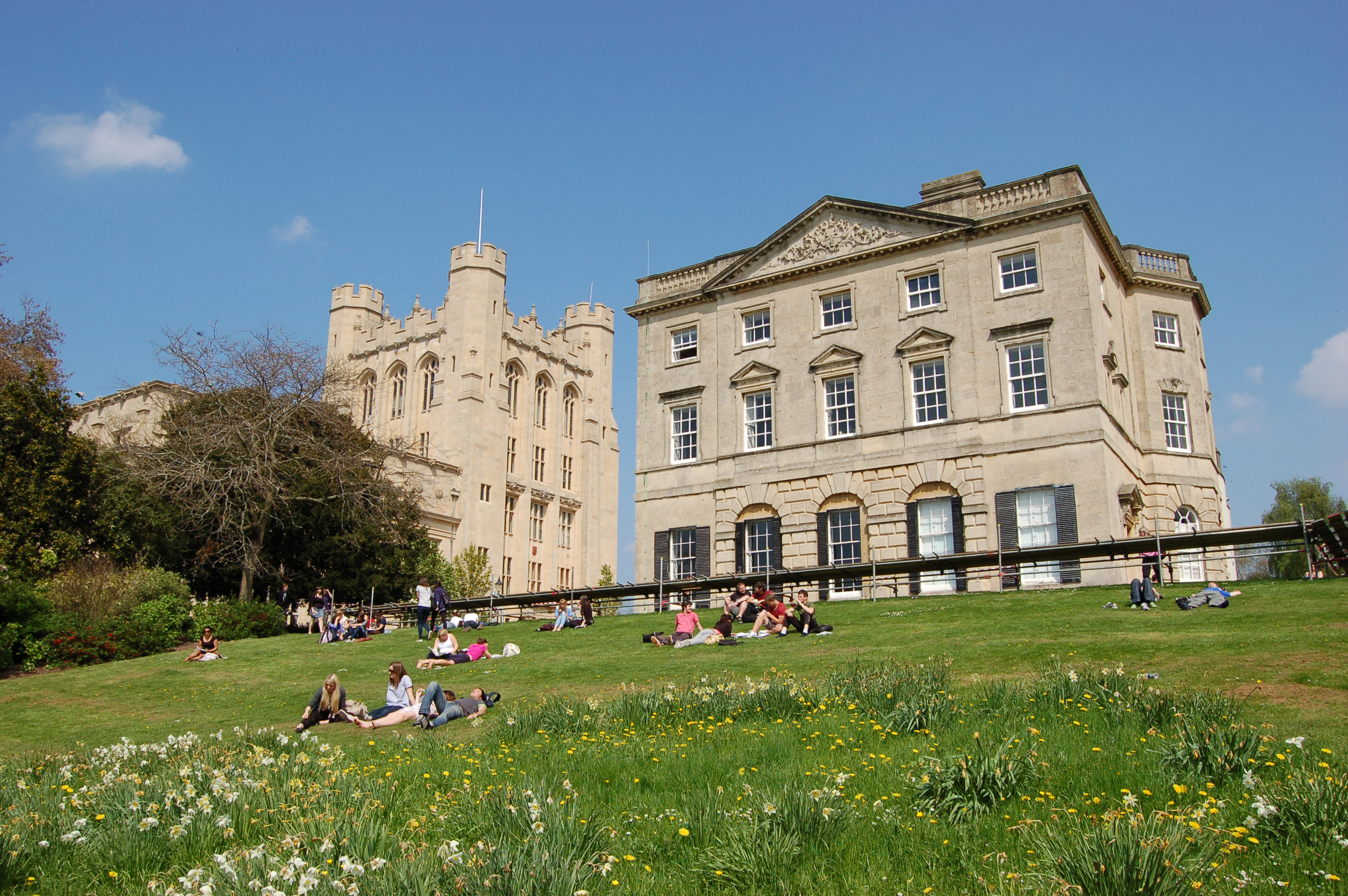
Royal Fort House in Bristol, built for Thomas Tyndall on an estate he inherited from his father.

Thomas Tyndall (bapt. 26 March 1723 – 17 April 1794) was an English merchant and banker from Bristol, with extensive slave trade connections.

Tyndall was the son of Onesiphorus Tyndall and Elizabeth Cowles and baptised in the Unitarian church. Tyndall's father had been a founding partner in the Old Bank in Bristol, and Tyndall inherited a considerable legacy on his father's death in 1757. Tyndall also succeeded his father as a partner in the bank. Tyndall's uncle William Tyndall was a slave factor in Jamaica, and owned a plantation with his business partner Richard Assheton.

Tyndall commissioned the Royal Fort House in Tyndalls Park in Bristol, now part of the University of Bristol. The house was built around 1767.

Tyndall's daughter Caroline married into another family heavily involved in the slave trade, the Brights.

Bristol University holds a painting of Tyndall and his wife and children, painted by Thomas Beach.
