= Court Funds Office =

The Court Funds Office (CFO) provides a banking and investment service for the courts throughout England and Wales, including the High Court. It accounts for money being paid into and out of court and, as directed by the court, look after any investments made with that money. The Accountant General of the Supreme Court is responsible for the proper control of all money paid into court.

The Court Funds Office is also responsible for money held on behalf of clients who are deemed mentally incapacitated. Under the Mental Capacity Act 2005, a Deputy (usually a relative) is appointed to look after their financial affairs and draw money from the CFO as and when necessary to ensure the continued care of the Protected Party.

Children who have been involved in an accident or obtained an award through civil litigation also have money held by the CFO. The money is invested in either a high paying interest account or part is invested on an interest account and part into the Equity Index Tracker fund (on the stock market). The CFO hold on to the funds until the child reaches 18 years of age, when they can apply to have the money and investments paid to them.

The Court Funds Office also deals with a large unclaimed balance fund (£35m). This is where money has been paid into a CFO account and lain dormant for a period of 10 years. Money can be left through a case collapsing, companies going into liquidation during trial; the result of house repossessions (the bank makes more than the debt from the sale but can't trace the original owner) and by the parties failing to progress or complete the action.

The Court Funds Office is based in Sunderland.
