= Corisande de Gramont =

Countess of Tankerville (1782–1865)

The Right Honourable The Countess of Tankerville
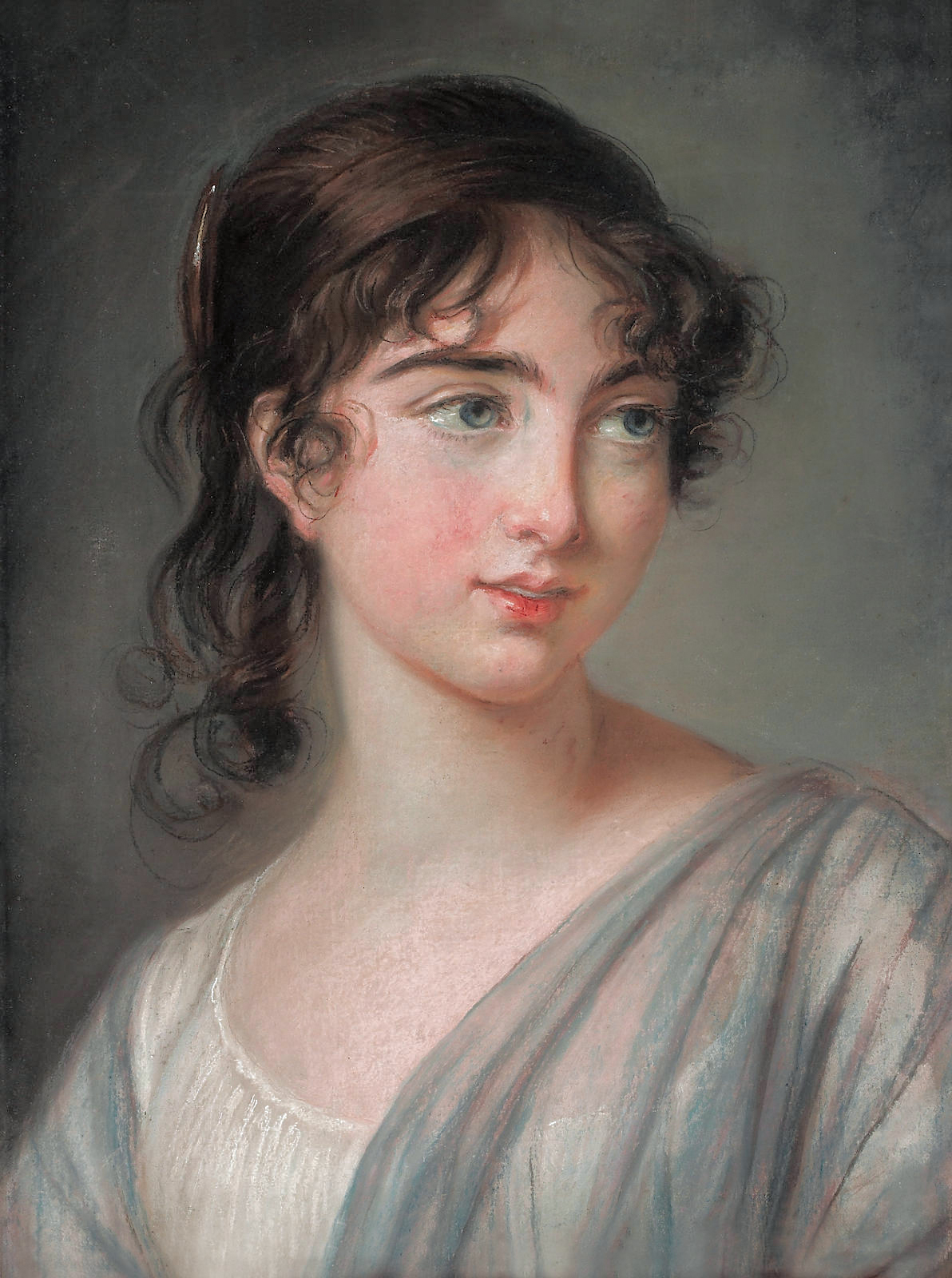
- A pastel portrait of Lady Ossulton, c. 1806; painted by Élisabeth Vigée Le Brun
- Born: 5 October 1782; Paris, Kingdom of France
- Died: 23 January 1865 (aged 82); Mayfair, England
- Buried: Trinity Centre, Bristol
- Spouse: Charles Bennet, 5th Earl of Tankerville (m. 1806; died 1859)
- Issue: Charles Bennet, 6th Earl of Tankerville; Lady Corisande Emma Bennet
- Father: Antoine Louis Marie de Gramont, 8th Duke of Gramont
- Mother: Aglaé de Polignac

Corisande de Gramont, Countess of Tankerville (5 October 1782 – 23 January 1865), styled Lady Ossulston from 1806 to 1822, was a French noblewoman and the wife of Charles Bennet, 5th Earl of Tankerville.

== Biography ==
=== Birth and background ===
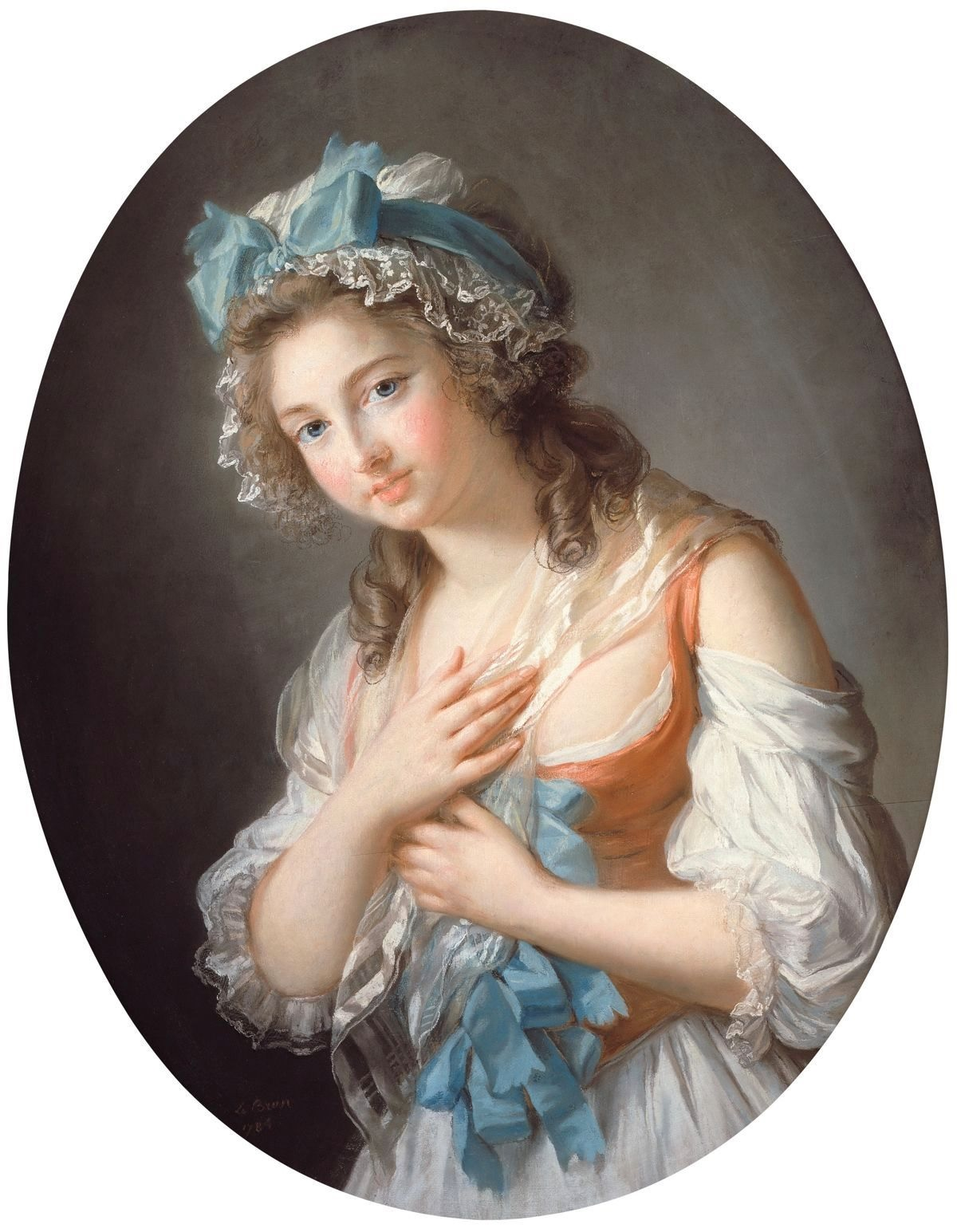
Pastel portrait of her mother, Aglaé de Polignac, by Élisabeth Vigée Le Brun (1784)

Corisande Armandine Sophie Léonie Hélène de Gramont was born on 5 October 1782 in Paris, France. She was likely named after the Countess of Guiche, Diane d'Andoins (1554–1621), who was called La Belle Corisande ("The Beautiful Corisande"). (Note: Diane's son, Antoine, became the first Duke of Gramont in 1643.)

Corisande was the eldest child and first daughter of the Duke of Guiche, Antoine Louis Marie de Gramont, and his wife, Aglaé de Polignac. Her parents married two years before her birth in July 1780. Corisande had a younger sister and brother: Aglaé (1787–1842) and Héraclius (1789–1855).

=== Early life ===
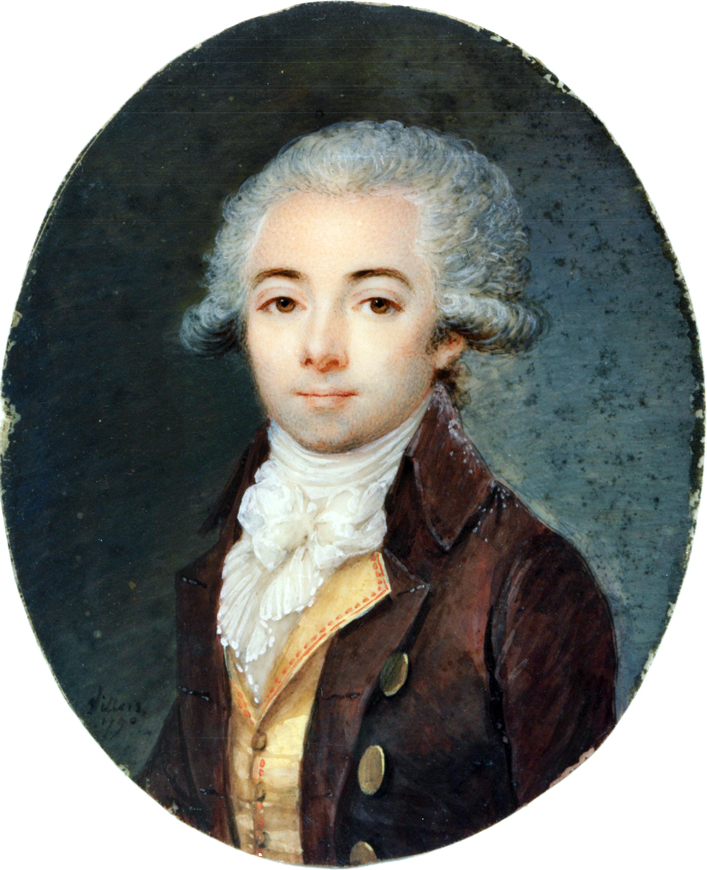
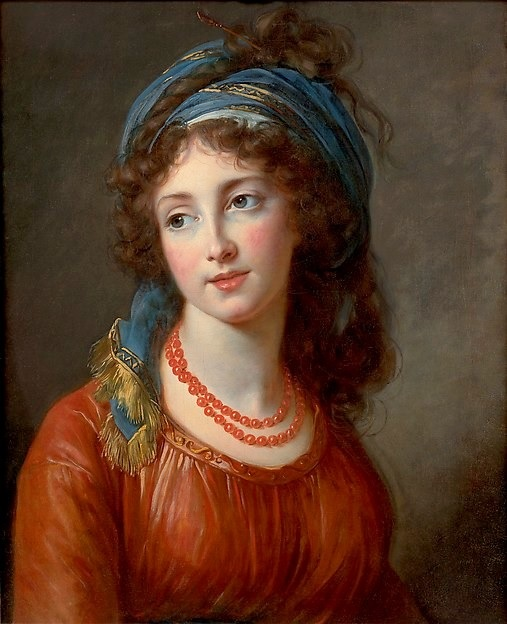
1790 portrait of her father, Antoine VIII, Duke of Guiche (left), 1794 portrait of her mother, Aglaé de Polignac (right), by Élisabeth Vigée Le Brun

As the granddaughter of Yolande de Polastron, the Polignac family were given benefits from the queen. Corisande and her younger siblings lived at the court of Marie Antoinette in the Palace of Versailles.

After the storming of the Bastille on 14 July 1789, all members of the Polignac family were exiled from France and obliged to flee immediately. Corisande and her family fled to Edinburgh, Scotland, where they lived in an apartment at the Palace of Holyroodhouse. (Note: During her exile at the Holyrood Palace, Corisande and her family lived with Bourbon members of the French royal family, including Prince Charles Philippe of France, later King Charles X.)

On 30 March 1803, Aglaé de Polignac died in an accidental fire in her apartment at eight o'clock in the morning, aged thirty-four.

=== Marriage ===
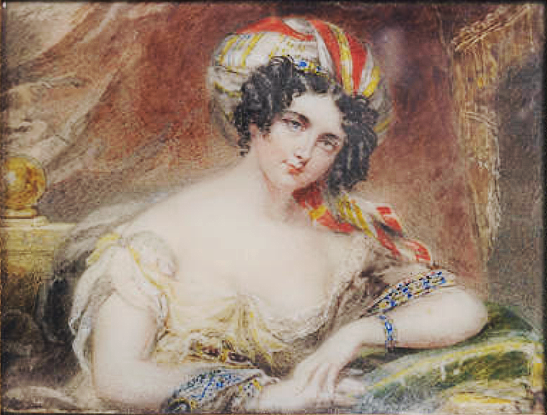
Portrait by John Linnell

On 28 July 1806, Corisande married Charles Bennet, 5th Earl of Tankerville and was titled Countess consort of Tankerville. The marriage took place at the Devonshire House. They had two children; Charles Bennet, 6th Earl of Tankerville, (1810–1899), and Lady Corisande Emma Bennet (1807–1876).

=== Death ===
Following the death of her husband on 25 June 1859, Corisande was given the title of Dowager Countess of Tankerville. Corisande died in London on 23 January 1865. Corisande outlived her sister, Aglaé de Gramont by 23 years and her younger brother, Héraclius de Gramont, 9th Duke of Gramont by a decade, despite being the eldest of the three. She was buried in St Mary's Catholic Cemetery in Kensal Green.
