= Jules de Polignac =

Prime minister of France from 1829-1830

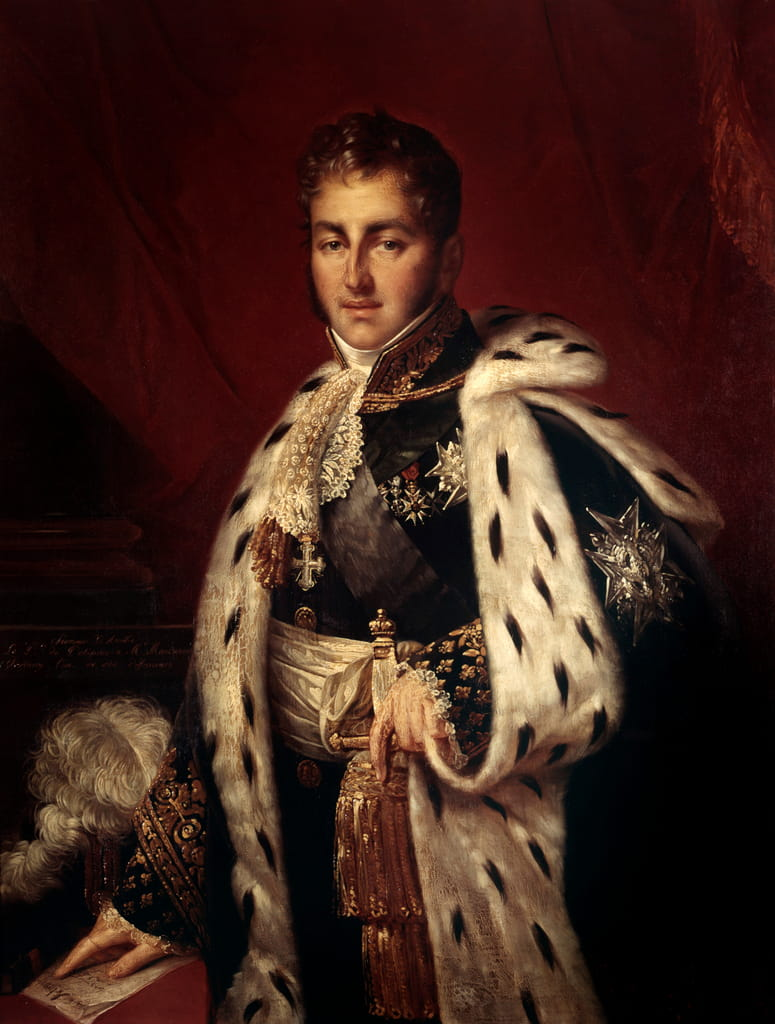
- Portrait by François Gérard

Prime Minister of France
- In office 8 August 1829 – 29 July 1830
- Monarch: Charles X
- Preceded by: Jean-Baptiste de Martignac
- Succeeded by: Casimir de Rochechouart

French Ambassador to the United Kingdom
- In office 28 December 1822 – 4 January 1828
- Appointed by: Jean-Baptiste de Villèle
- Preceded by: François-René de Chateaubriand
- Succeeded by: Pierre de Montmorency-Laval

Personal details
- Born: 14 May 1780 Versailles, Île-de-France, Kingdom of France
- Died: 2 March 1847 (aged 66) Saint-Germain-en-Laye, Yvelines, France
- Resting place: Picpus Cemetery
- Party: Ultra-royalist
- Spouses: Barbara Campbell (m. 1816; died 1819) Charlotte Parkyns de Choiseul (m. 1824; annulled 1832)
- Children: Armand; Seyna-Camille; Alphonse; Ludovic; Yolande; Camille; Edmond
- Parent(s): Jules, 1st Duke of Polignac; Yolande de Polastron

Jules Auguste Armand Marie de Polignac, Count of Polignac (French: [ʒyl də pɔliɲak]; 14 May 1780 – 30 March 1847), then Prince of Polignac, and briefly 3rd Duke of Polignac in 1847, was a French statesman and ultra-royalist politician after the Revolution. He served as prime minister under Charles X, just before the July Revolution in 1830 that overthrew the senior line of the House of Bourbon.

== Early life ==
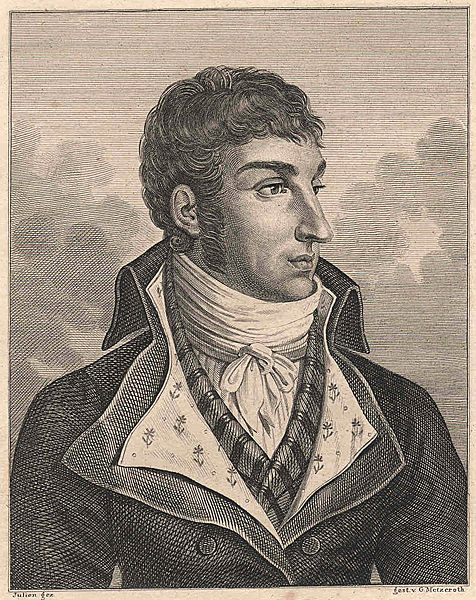
Portrait of Jules de Polignac during the First Empire

Coat of arms of the House of Polignac

Born in Versailles, Jules was the younger son of Jules, 1st Duke of Polignac, and Gabrielle de Polastron, a confidante and favourite of Queen Marie-Antoinette. Due to his mother's privileged position, the young Jules was raised in the environment of the court of Versailles, where his family occupied a luxurious suite of thirteen rooms. His sister, Aglaé, was married to the duc de Guîche at a young age, helping to cement the Polignac family's position as one of the leaders of high society at Versailles.

With the outbreak of the French Revolution in 1789, Jules's mother and her circle were forced to flee abroad due to threats against their lives. She had been one of the most consistent supporters of absolutism, and she bequeathed these political sympathies to her son following her death in 1793.

== Marriages and issue ==
Jules married twice. He was first married in London, in 1816, to Barbara Campbell (Ardneaves House, Islay 22 Aug. 1788 – Saint-Mandé 23 May 1819), a young Scotswoman. Barbara later returned with him to France, where they had two children:

- Prince Armand (1817–1890), later 4th duc de Polignac; he has male-line descendants to date who bear the principal title.
- Princess Seyna-Camille (1818–1833)

After his first wife's death in 1819, he married in London, on 3 June 1824, Charlotte, comtesse de Choiseul, widow of comte Cesar de Choiseul (d. 1821), née the Honourable (Maria) Charlotte Parkyns (St. Marylebone, 6 Jan. 1792 – 1/2 Sep. 1864). She was the youngest child (of six children) of Thomas Parkyns, 1st Baron Rancliffe (created 1795) and his wife Elizabeth Anne James, and sister of George Augustus Anne Parkyns, Lord Rancliffe and Henrietta, Lady Rumbold (1789–1833), wife of Sir William Rumbold, 3rd Bt. He had met her while she was renewing her passport at the London embassy, where he was the Ambassador (1823–1829). They had five children, two of whom were born while their father was in prison:

- Prince Alphonse (1826–1863), born during his father's ambassadorship in London. He entered Polytechnique in 1849 and formulated Polignac's conjecture the same year. He married Jeanne Emilie Mirès (called Amelie by Kahan) and had one daughter. He died some time after a very public trial exonerated his father-in-law Jules Mirès of embezzlement.
- Prince Ludovic or "Louis" (1827–1904), born during his father's ambassadorship in London. He entered Polytechnique in 1851 and pursued a military career. He married in 1874 Gabriele, Princess von Croy, with no issue.
- Princess Yolande (1830–1855), named after her grandmother Gabrielle de Polastron, Duchess of Polignac. She was born shortly before her father's incarceration as an Ultra. In 1848, she married Sosthène II de La Rochefoucauld, Duke of Doudeauville.
- Prince Camille (1832–1913), a major-general in the Confederate Army during the American Civil War. He married twice: by his first marriage, he had one daughter; by his second marriage, he had two daughters and one son, Prince Victor de Polignac (1899–1998). He has issue and descendants through his eldest daughter.
- Prince Edmond (1834–1901), later a noted musician and composer, who married Winnaretta Singer in a famous mariage blanc.

The couple's marriage was annulled by the French Chamber of Peers, but Jules and Charlotte went to England after his release in 1836, and they renewed their vows before the French consul in 1837.

== Career ==
Returning to France, which was then ruled by Napoleon Bonaparte, Jules continued in his zealous loyalty to the exiled royal family. In 1804, a year after his sister's death, Jules was implicated in the conspiracy of Cadoudal and Pichegru to assassinate Bonaparte, and was imprisoned until 1813. After the restoration of the Bourbons, he was rewarded with various honours and positions. He held various offices, received from the Pope his title of "Prince," in 1820, and in 1823, King Louis XVIII made him ambassador to Great Britain. A year later, his mother's former friend ascended the throne as King Charles X. Polignac's political sympathies did not alter, and he was one of the most conspicuous ultra-royalists during the Restoration era.

At the time, it was rumoured that Polignac supported ultra-royalist policies because he thought he was receiving inspiration from the Virgin Mary. There is little historical evidence for this story, however. There is no mention of such motivation in Polignac's personal memoirs or in the memoirs of the Restoration court.

On 8 August 1829, Charles X appointed him to the ministry of foreign affairs and in the following November, Polignac became president of the council, effectively the most powerful politician in France. Critics of the king’s government saw Polignac’s rise as a step towards overthrowing the constitution. Polignac, with other ministers, was held responsible for the decision to issue the Four Ordinances, which were the immediate cause of the revolution of July 1830.

Upon the outbreak of revolt, he fled, wandering for some time among the wilds of Normandy before he was arrested at Granville. At his trial before the Chamber of Peers, he was condemned and sentenced to 'perpetual' imprisonment at the château in Ham. But he benefited by the amnesty of 1836, when his sentence was commuted to exile. During his captivity, he wrote Considerations politiques (1832). Afterwards, he spent several years in exile in England before being permitted to re-enter France, on condition that he never again take up his abode in Paris.

According to the Legacies of British Slave-Ownership at the University College London, de Polignac was awarded a payment as a slave trader in the aftermath of the Slavery Abolition Act 1833 with the Slave Compensation Act 1837. The British Government took out a £15 million loan (worth £1.54 billion in 2025) with interest from Nathan Mayer Rothschild and Moses Montefiore, paid from the public budget (formally ending in 2015). de Polignac was associated with three different claims, he owned 628 slaves in Saint Vincent and the Grenadines and received a £15,765 payment at the time (worth £1.62 million in 2025). Although a French subject, de Polignac had connections in the British Empire due to his Scottish wife, Barbara Campbell (1788–1819), daughter of Duncan Campbell of Ardnave.

From his second marriage to Maria-Charlotte Parkyns, daughter of Lord Rancliffe, Jules de Polignac had fathered seven children, including Prince Ludovic de Polignac (1827–1904), a lieutenant-colonel in the French Army who participated in the colonization of Algeria; Prince Camille Armand Jules Marie de Polignac (1832–1913), a major-general in the Confederate Army during the American Civil War; and Prince Edmond de Polignac (1834–1901), a composer, musical theorist and proponent of the octatonic scale.

Jules died at St. Germain in 1847 from the effects of his imprisonment. About one month prior, he had assumed the title of duc de Polignac upon the death of his older brother, Armand, who had died without children.

Comte Pierre de Polignac, later Prince Pierre, Duke of Valentinois (father of Rainier III of Monaco and therefore an ancestor of the entire current princely family) is descended from a different and cadet branch of the Polignac family, which has the comital rank only. Pierre was the youngest son, descended from the youngest son of the first Duke of Polignac.

== Ancestry ==
Ancestors of Jules de Polignac

8. Scipion Sidoine Apolinaire Gaspard Armand (XX) de Polignac, Viscount Polignac, Marquis of Chalencon
4. Louis Héracle Armand (XXI) de Polastron, Viscount of Polignac
9. Françoise de Mailly
2. Jules de Polastron, Count then Duke of Polignac
10. Jacques Hippolyte Mancini, Marquis Mancini
5. Diane Adélaide Zéphirine Mancini
11. Anne Louise de Noailles
1. Jules de Polignac (1780–1847), Prince of Polignac
12. Count Jean Baptiste de Polastron
6. Count Jean François Gabriel de Polastron
13. Françoise de Mirmand, Countess Plaissan
3. Yolande de Polastron
14. René Herault, Seigneur of Fontaine
7. Jeanne Charlotte Herault
15. Marie Marguerite Vieuxcourt Durey

== See also ==
- List of Ambassadors of France to the United Kingdom

== Literature ==
- W. Schlésinger, Les femmes du XVIIIe siècle: La duchesse de Polignac et son temps (Paris, 1889)
- Michael St. John Packe, refers to Polignac as "rascally" in his "Life of John Stuart Mill".

== Notes ==
Political offices
| Preceded by The Viscount of Martignac | Prime Minister of France; 1829–1830 | Succeeded by Casimir de Rochechouart |
French nobility
| Preceded by Armand de Polignac | Duke of Polignac; 1 March 1847 – 30 March 1847 | Succeeded by Jules de Polignac |
