= Polignac =

Polignac may refer to:

- Polignac family, a French noble family, including a list of its members
- Duke of Polignac, a title created in 1780 for the Polignac family
- Polignac (card game), a French card game for four players

== Places ==
- Polignac, Charente-Maritime, a municipality in the Charente-Maritime department, France
- Polignac, Haute-Loire, a municipality in the Haute Loire department, France
