= Aglaé de Gramont =

French noblewoman and socialite (1787–1842)

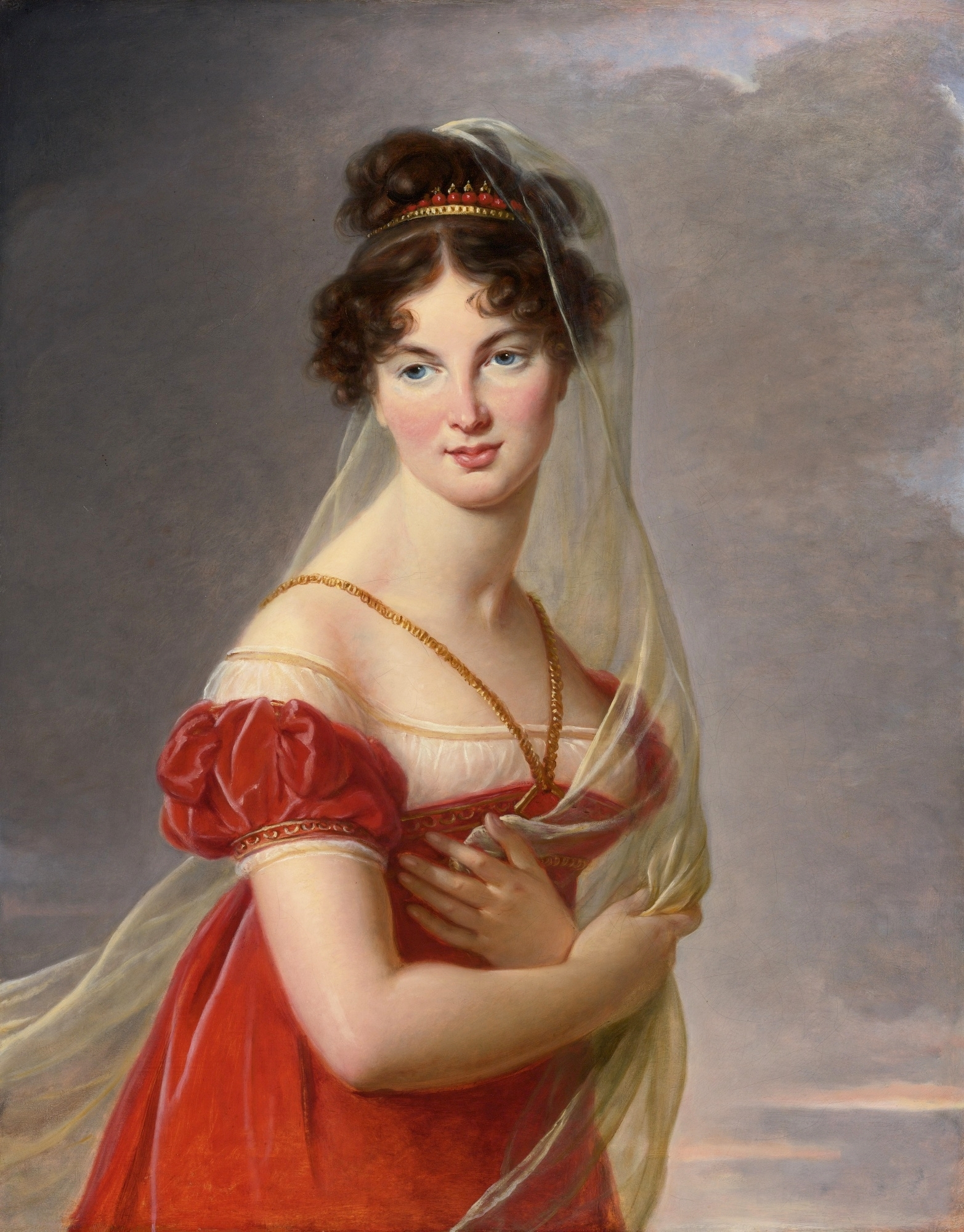
- Portrait by Élisabeth Vigée Le Brun, c. 1824
- Born: 17 January 1787; Versailles, France
- Died: 21 January 1842 (aged 55); Paris, France
- Spouses: Alexander Lvovich Davydov (m. 1804, separated) Horace François Bastien Sébastiani de La Porta (1835–1842, her death)
- Issue Detail: Catherine Alexandrovna Davydova; Elizaveta Alexandrovna Davydova; Vladimir Aleksandrovich Davydov
- Father: Antoine Louis Marie de Gramont, 8th Duke of Gramont
- Mother: Aglaé de Polignac

Aglaé de Gramont (Note: Russian: Аглая Антоновна Давыдова, romanized: Aglaya Antonovna Davydova; Russian pronunciation: [ɐˈɡɫaɪ̯ə ɐnˈtonəvnə dɐˈvɨdəfɐ].) (Aglaé Angélique Gabrielle; 17 January 1787 – 21 January 1842) was a French noblewoman, aristocrat, socialite, and the addressee of the poems of Alexander Pushkin.

== Biography ==
=== Birth and background ===
Aglaé Angélique Gabrielle de Gramont was born on 17 January 1787, at Versailles. Her parents, Aglaé de Polignac and Antoine Louis Marie de Gramont, 8th Duke of Gramont married on 11 July 1780.

Her maternal grandparents, Yolande de Polastron, courtier and favourite of Marie Antoinette, and Jules de Polignac, 1st Duke of Polignac were of noble origin.

Her maternal great-grandparents, Diane Adélaïde Zéphirine Mancini (Note: Diane Adélaïde Zéphirine Mancini was a granddaughter of Philippe Jules Mancini, Duke of Nevers, brother of the notorious, Mazarinettes.) and Louis Heraclius de Polignac descended from the House of Noailles.

=== Early life ===
Following the outset of the French Revolution, Aglaé and her family fled to Edinburgh, Scotland, where they lived at the Palace of Holyroodhouse. (Note: Aglaé and her family lived with members of Royal families, including Charles X of France.) On 30 March 1803 her mother, aged 34, died in an accidental house fire in her apartment at eight o'clock in the morning.

=== Marriage ===
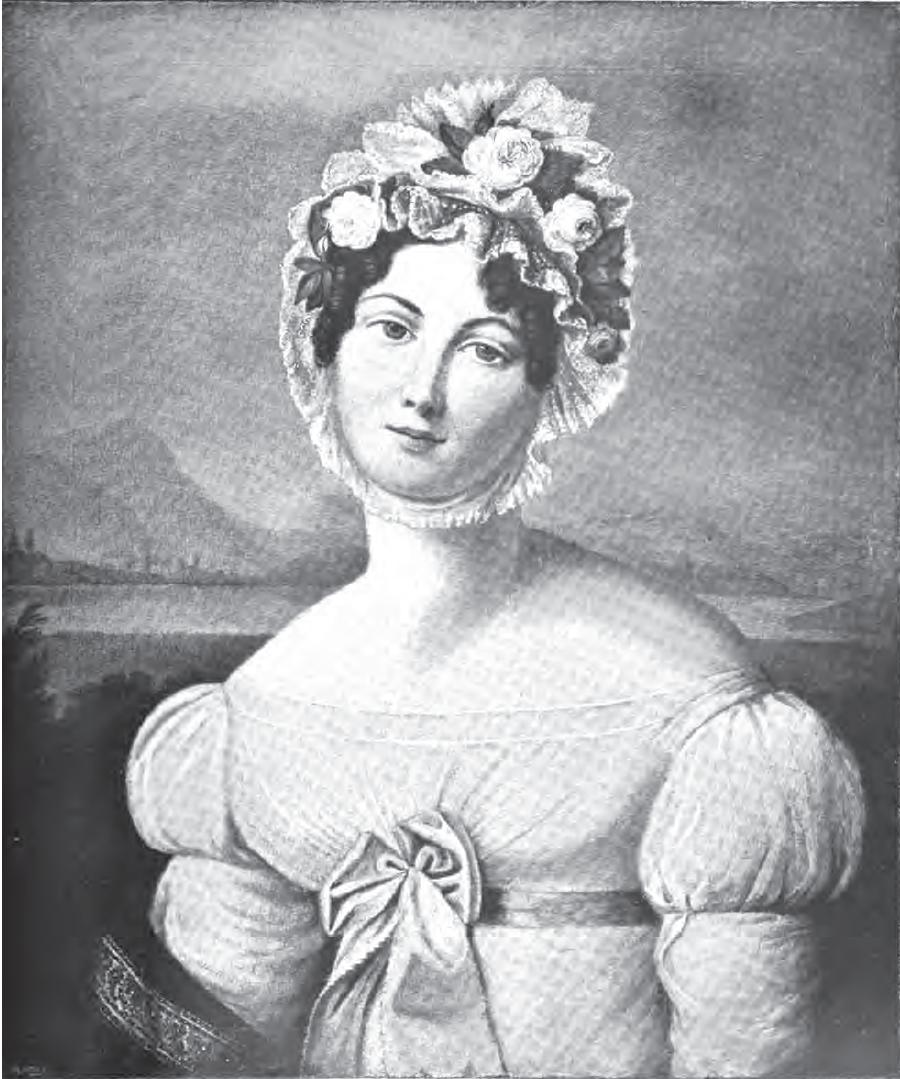
Portrait of Aglaé, c. 1810s

In 1804, at the age of 17, a year after her mother's death, Aglaé married Major General Alexander Lvovich Davydov at Petersburg, Russia. The union resulted in the birth of 4 children; Ekaterina (1805–1882), Yuliania (born and died 1807), Elizaveta (1810–1882), and Vladimir (1816–1886).

In the 1820s, Aglaé left her husband, and went in pursuit to France alongside her daughters. She remarried in 1835 to Horace François Bastien Sébastiani de La Porta; however, the marriage remained childless.

== Issue ==
Name	Portrait	Lifespan	Age	Notes
Catherine Alexandrovna Davydova; Marquise de Gabriac		1806 – 15 February 1882	76 years old	Catherine was a noblewoman from Russian and French descent. She married Ernest de Cadoine de Gabriac, French diplomat and politician.
Elizaveta Alexandrovna Davydova; Nun		1810 – 1882	72 years old	Elizaveta was a nun at the Sacré-Cœur monastery. Having dedicated her 32 years to the church, she was released in 1866. She died unmarried and childless.
Vladimir Aleksandrovich Davydov; Russian Colonel		1816 – 11 June 1886	70 years old	Vladmir was a nobleman from Russian and French descent. He is known for his scandalous divorce to Elizabeth Orbeliani-Baryatinskaya.

== Popular culture ==
In 1822, Alexander Pushkin dedicated a poem to Aglaé, "Another had my Aglaya":

Another had my Aglaya
For his uniform and black moustache,
Another for money - I understand,
Another because he was French,
Cleon - frightening her with his mind,
Damis - because he sang tenderly.
Tell me now, my friend Aglaya,
Why did your husband have you?
