= Aglaé de Polignac =

French noble (1768–1803)

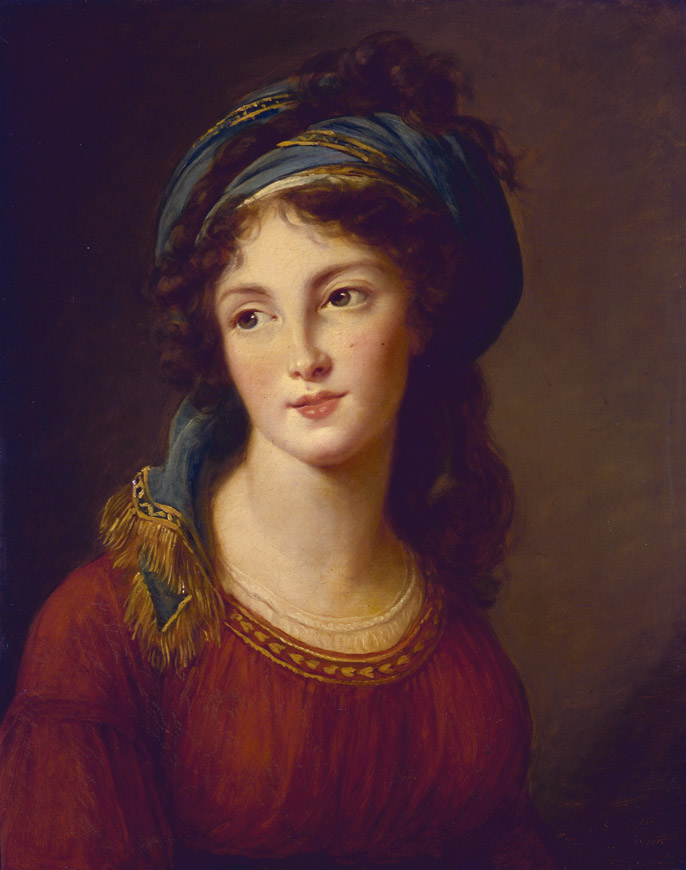
Portrait of Aglaé Louise de Polignac, by Élisabeth Vigée Le Brun

Aglaé Louise Françoise Gabrielle de Polignac (7 May 1768 – 30 March 1803) was the daughter of Gabrielle de Polastron, the favourite and confidante of Marie Antoinette, and her husband, the 1st duc de Polignac.

== Life ==
Aglaé was born in Paris in 1768, her parents were Comte and Comtesse Jules de Polignac. Her paternal grandparents were Marquis Louis Héracle Melchior de Polignac (1717–1792) and his wife, Diane Marie Adelaide Zephirine Mazzarini-Mancini (1726–1755). Her maternal grandparents were Jean François Gabriel, comte de Polastron, and his wife, Jeanne Charlotte Hérault.

Aglaé Louise was born at the Château de Versailles in Paris, France, the eldest child and only daughter of the Duke and Duchess of Polignac. She had three brothers: Armand Jules Marie Héracle, duc de Polignac (11 January 1771 – 1 March 1847); Jules Auguste Armand Marie, prince de Polignac (14 May 1780 – 30 March 1847); and Camille Henri Melchior, comte de Polignac (27 December 1781 – 2 February 1855).

At the Château de Versailles, on 11 July 1780, at the age of twelve, Aglaé married twenty-five-year-old Antoine-Louis, the duc de Gramont et Guiche. She then became the Duchess of Guiche and was nicknamed "Guichette" by her family. Her son Antoine-Geneviève-Héraclius-Agénor de Gramont became the 9th Duke of Gramont. Her daughter Corisande Armandine Léonie Sophie de Gramont married Charles Bennet, 5th Earl of Tankerville, and another daughter, Aglaé Angélique Gabrielle de Gramont, was married in turn to Russian general Alexander Lvovich Davydov and French diplomat Horace Sébastiani.

In 1794, according to The Memoirs of Madame Vigée Lebrun, Marie-Élisabeth-Louise Vigée-Le Brun painted a half-length portrait of the Duchess de Guiche wearing a blue turban, in Directoire style. She wrote: "...I encountered the Duchesse de Guiche, whose lovely face had not changed in the least."

On 30 March 1803, Aglaé de Polignac died in an accidental house fire at her home in Edinburgh, Scotland.

== Issue ==
Name	Portrait	Lifespan	Age	Notes
Aglaé Angélique Gabrielle de Gramont; Aristocrat		17 January 1787 – 21 January 1842	55 years and 4 days	Aglaé married twice, once to major-general of the Russian Empire; Alexander Lvovich Davydov, and secondly to Horace François Bastien Sébastiani de La Porta, the French Minister of Foreign Affairs.
Corisande de Gramont; Countess of Tankerville		5 October 1782 – 23 January 1865	82 years, 3 months and 18 days	Corisande married once to Charles Bennet, 5th Earl of Tankerville, Treasurer of the Household. After the tragic death of her husband Corisande lived her remaining 6 years, as a widow.
Héraclius de Gramont, 9th Duke of Gramont; Duke of Gramont		7 June 1789 – 4 March 1855	65 years, 8 months and 25 days	Héraclius was the 9th Duke of Guiche after he succeeded his father in 1836. He also was Prince of Bidache, and an Army general. He married Anna-Quintina-Albertine "Ida" Grimod, the sister to Alfred d'Orsay.

== Popular culture ==
In Riyoko Ikeda's shōjo manga The Rose of Versailles and its anime adaptation, Aglaé is renamed Charlotte and is depicted killing herself rather than marry the Duc de Guiche (who is depicted as much older than in reality) at her mother's behest. Rosalie Lamorlière is depicted, ahistorically, as her illegitimate half-sister.
