= Camille Armand Jules Marie, Prince de Polignac =

French nobleman (1832–1913)

Prince Camille de Polignac
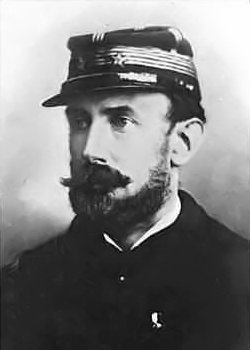
- Prince Camille de Polignac in Confederate uniform
- Born: February 16, 1832; Millemont, Seine-et-Oise, France
- Died: November 15, 1913 (aged 81); Paris, France
- Burial place: Hauptfriedhof, Frankfurt am Main, Germany
- Military career
- Allegiance: Second French Empire; Confederate States of America
- Branch: French Army; Confederate States Army
- Service years: 1853–1859, 1870–1871 (France); 1861–1865 (CSA)
- Rank: Major General (France); Major General (CSA)
- Nickname: Prince Polecat
- Conflicts: Crimean War; American Civil War; Franco-Prussian War

Prince Camille Armand Jules Marie de Polignac (February 16, 1832 – November 15, 1913) was a French nobleman who served with the Confederates in the American Civil War, living on to become the last surviving Confederate major-general.

After service in the French army in the Crimea, Polignac was travelling in America at the outbreak of war, when he sided with the South. He distinguished himself as a brigadier in the Red River Campaign, notably at the Battle of Mansfield, after which he was promoted to the rank of divisional commander. Polignac was affectionately known by his troops, unable to decipher how to pronounce his name, as "Prince Polecat". which he apparently found amusing.

Returning to France, he commanded a division in the Franco-Prussian War, before devoting himself to the study of mathematics and music.

== Early life and career ==
Polignac was born in Millemont, Seine-et-Oise, France, into one of the most prominent families of the French nobility. His paternal grandmother, Yolande de Polastron, had been a famous aristocratic beauty and Queen Marie-Antoinette's closest friend. His grandfather traced his male-line back to 1205, and was made a duke in 1780. His father, Jules de Polignac, was the absolutist chief minister of King Charles X of France who was rewarded for his services with the title of prince, which all of his legitimate male-line descendants enjoy (his first cousin twice removed, Prince Pierre de Polignac, Duke of Valentinois, would become prince consort to the heiress of the Grimaldi dynasty in 1920, and his descendants still rule the Principality of Monaco).

Polignac studied mathematics and music at St. Stanislas College in the 1840s. In 1853, he joined the French army. He served in the Crimean War from 1854 to 1855, receiving a commission as a second lieutenant. He resigned from the army in 1859 and traveled to Central America to study geography and political economy, as well as the native plant life. He then visited the United States in the early 1860s.

== American Civil War ==
With the outbreak of the Civil War, Polignac initially served on the staffs of generals P. G. T. Beauregard and Braxton Bragg as a lieutenant colonel. He served at the Battle of Shiloh and the subsequent Siege of Corinth. In January 1863, he was promoted to brigadier general. Two months later, he was transferred to the Trans-Mississippi Department and assigned command of a Texas infantry brigade. Polignac is best known for his leadership at the Battle of Mansfield, April 8, 1864, in De Soto Parish, Louisiana, a Confederate victory in the first major action of the Red River Campaign. Polignac received a battlefield promotion at Mansfield to division command after the death of General Alfred Mouton and then proceeded to fight again at the Pleasant Hill, further south in De Soto Parish.

Formally promoted to major general on June 14, 1864, Polignac led the division throughout the remainder of the campaign and during its service in Arkansas in the fall of 1864. In March 1865, he was sent to Napoleon III of France to request intervention on behalf of the Confederacy but arrived too late to accomplish his mission.

== Postwar ==
After the Civil War, Polignac returned to his large estate in France, and resumed his travels and studies in Central America. He published several articles on his Civil War experiences. He returned to the French army as a Brigadier General, and later a Major General and commanded a division in the Franco-Prussian War (1870 to 1871), he was cited for distinguished service. In recognition of his conduct, he was invested as a Chevalier of the Légion d’honneur, France’s highest order of merit for military and civil distinction.

In Ober-Ingelheim on 4 November 1874, he married Marie Adolphine/Adolfine Langenberger (Frankfurt, 7 June 1853 – Paris, 16 January 1876) and had one daughter:

- Princess Marie Armande Mathilde (Paris, 8 January 1876 – Neauphle-le-Vieux, 29 April 1962), married in Paris on 12 February 1895 to Count Jean Alfred Octave de Chabannes-La Palice (Lapalisse, 1871 – Paris, 28 August 1933), notable composer.

In London, on 3 May 1883, he married secondly Margaret Elizabeth Knight (Olivet, 22 June 1864 – Castle La Roche-Gençay, Magné, 20 August 1940) by whom he also had children:

- Princess Mabel Constance (London, 29 January 1884 – La Seyne-sur-Mer, 28 March 1973), married in Torquay on 12 July 1906 Count Henri Thierry Michel de Pierredon (Paris, 11 September 1883 – Castle La Roche-Gençay, Magné, 8 July 1955)
- Princess Hélène Agnès Anne (Vienna, 30 June 1886 – Limpiville, 23 December 1978), married in Torquay on 20 August 1910 Henri Marie Georges Le Compasseur Créqui Montfort, Marquis de Courtrivon (Sainte-Adresse, 27 September 1877 – Neuilly, 4 April 1966)
- Prince Victor Mansfield Alfred (London, 17 June 1899 – 4 November 1998), married in Monaco on 27 June 1963 Elizabeth Ashfield Walker (Washington, 11 May 1896 – Monaco, 17 November 1976), without issue

Polignac continued to study mathematics and music until his health failed.

When he died in Paris, France at the age of 81, Polignac was the last living Confederate major-general. He was buried with his wife's family in Germany in Hauptfriedhof, Frankfurt-on-Main.

In 1998, the Texas Tech University historian Alwyn Barr released the second edition of his Polignac's Texas Brigade, a study of Polignac and the Texans who fought in Mansfield and then Sabine Crossroads.

== See also ==
- List of American Civil War generals (Confederate)
