= Duke of Polignac =

French noble title created in 1780

Dukedom of Polignac
- Creation date: 20 September 1780
- Created by: Louis XVI
- Peerage: Peerage of France
- First holder: Jules de Polignac

The title of Duke of Polignac (French: Duc de Polignac) is a French dukedom that is held by the Polignac family.

== History ==
The title was originally created for Jules de Polignac in 1780 by brevet, which meant it was not hereditary. It was made heritable in 1783 according to masculine primogeniture. In 1817, the holder was made a peer of France, granting him the right to sit in the Chamber of Peers of the Bourbon Restoration.

The third duke, Jules, a younger son of the first duke, was created (before his succession to the dukedom) a prince of the Papal States in 1820, authorised to bear the title in France in 1822, and granted the same title in the Kingdom of Bavaria in 1838, which extended it to his male-line descendants. Thus, the descendants of the third duke bear the title of Prince (Fürst) or Princess (Fürstin) de Polignac, while members of the family descended only from the first duke use the title of Comte or Mademoiselle de Polignac.

The wife of the first duke was the famous Yolande de Polastron, a favourite of Queen Marie Antoinette. The mathematician Prince Alphonse de Polignac, soldier Prince Camille de Polignac and composer Prince Edmond de Polignac were younger sons of the third duke. Princess Edmond de Polignac, wife of the last named, was the American heiress Winnaretta Singer. Comte Pierre de Polignac, a great-great-grandson of the first duke, married Princess Charlotte, Duchess of Valentinois and was the father of Rainier III, Prince of Monaco.

== Ducs de Polignac ==
1. Armand-Jules-François, duc de Polignac (31 December 1745 – 21 September 1817).
2. Armand-Jules-Marie-Héracle, duc de Polignac (17 January 1771 – 1 March 1847).
3. Auguste-Jules-Armand-Marie, prince de Polignac (14 May 1780 – 30 March 1847).
4. Jules-Armand-Jean-Melchior, prince de Polignac (12 August 1817 – 17 March 1890).
5. Armand-Héracle-Marie, prince de Polignac (14 June 1843 – 20 November 1917).
6. Armand-Henri-Jules-Marie, prince de Polignac (2 February 1872 – 4 December 1961).
7. Jean-Héracle-Armand-François-Emmanuel-Marie-Joseph, prince de Polignac (14 October 1914 – 11 November 1999).
8. Charles-Armand-Emmanuel-Marie-Joseph-Jules, prince de Polignac (b. 7 October 1946).

- Ludovic de Polignac (b. 1972) is the heir-presumptive.
