= Héraclius de Gramont, 9th Duke of Gramont =

French general (1789–1855)

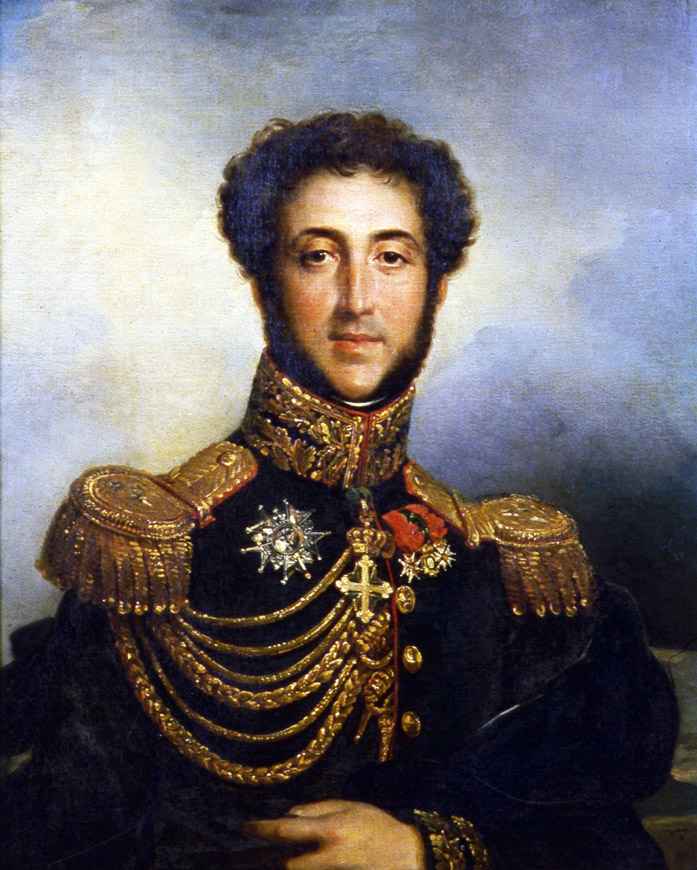
General The 9th Duke of Gramont

Héraclius de Gramont, 9th Duke of Gramont (Antoine Geneviève Héraclius Agénor; 17 July 1789 – 3 March 1855), 9th Duke of Gramont, Duke of Guiche, Prince of Bidache, etc. was a 19th-century French aristocratic Army general and courtier.

== Early life ==
De Gramont was born at Versailles, the only son of Antoine, 8th Duke of Gramont by his wife Aglaé, daughter of Gabrielle de Polastron, duchesse de Polignac, a court favourite of Queen Marie-Antoinette. One of his elder sisters, Aglaé-Angélique-Gabrielle (1787-1842) married firstly Count Aleksandr Lvovich Davydov (or Davidoff), who died 1833, and was ancestor of the Marquesses of Gabriac; the Dowager Countess Davidoff married secondly Count Horace Sébastiani de La Porta.

Arms de Gramont

== Career ==
When the French Revolution broke out, in the year of his birth, the De Gramont family left France for various parts of Europe: including Britain, Italy, Austria as well as Russia.

Héraclius de Gramont joined his father in Mittau, who was serving with Louis XVIII, before being commissioned at the age of nine in the Tauride Grenadier Regiment. Following basic training he was promoted lieutenant and fought under the Russian General Suvorov's command.

Accorded the courtesy title of duc de Guiche in 1813, he returned to England to complete his education before serving under the Duke of Wellington later in the Peninsular Wars. After the fall of Napoleon, his military career continued to prosper and he was appointed lieutenant-general in the French Army in 1823 and, in 1830, later accompanied King Charles X to exile in Scotland.

== Personal life ==
On 23 July 1818 in Paris, Gramont married Anna-Quintina-Albertine "Ida" Grimod, Countess d'Orsay (1802–1882), a sister of Count Alfred d'Orsay. Together, they had:

- Antoine Alfred Agénor de Gramont, 10th Duke of Gramont (1819–1880), who married Emma Mary Mackinnon, daughter of William Alexander Mackinnon, 33rd Chief of the Scottish Clan Mackinnon, in 1848.
- Antoine Philibert Léon Auguste de Gramont, Duke of Lesparre (1820–1877), who married Marie Sophie de Ségur, a daughter of Alexandre de Ségur, in 1844.
- Antonia Albertine Corisande de Gramont (1821–1826);
- Antoine Alfred Annérius Théophile de Gramont (1823–1881), styled Count of Gramont, who married Louise Cécile Charlotte de Choiseul-Praslin in 1848.
- Antonia Armandine Aglaé Ida de Gramont (1825–1871).
- Antonia Gabrielle Léontine de Gramont (1829–1897), who died unmarried and without issue.

The Duke died in Paris on 3 March 1855, aged 65.

=== Descendants ===
Through his son Alfred, he was a grandfather of Antoine Alfred Armand Xavier Louis, Comte de Gramont (1861–1923), who married Anne Marie Brincard, of the Barons Brincard, in 1886.

== Honours ==
- Grand officier de la Légion d'honneur
- Chevalier de Saint-Louis
- Grand-croix de St Maurice et St Lazare

French nobility
Preceded by Antoine de Gramont	Duke of Gramont; 1836 - 1855	Succeeded by Agénor de Gramont
