= Claye-Souilly =

- Commune
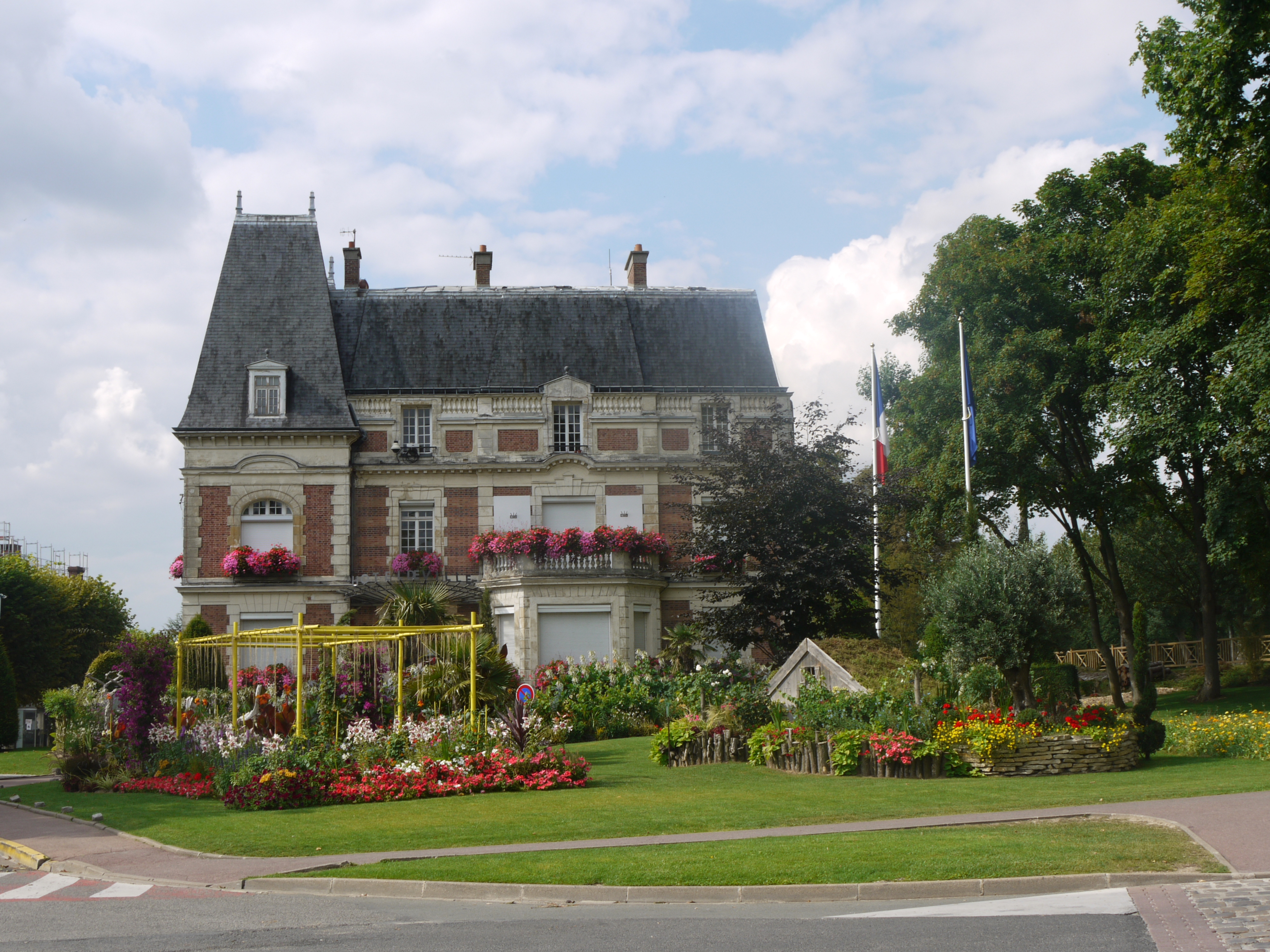
- The town hall in Claye-Souilly

- Coat of arms
- Location of Claye-Souilly
- Location within France Location within Île-de-France (region)
- Coordinates: 48°57′00″N 2°42′00″E
- Country: France
- Region: Île-de-France
- Department: Seine-et-Marne
- Arrondissement: Meaux
- Canton: Claye-Souilly
- Intercommunality: CA Roissy Pays de France

Government
  - Mayor (2020–2026): Jean-Luc Servières
- Area^{1}: 15.07 km^{2} (5.82 sq mi)
- Highest elevation: 124 m (407 ft)
- Lowest elevation: 42 m (138 ft)
- Population (2023): 13,353
  - Density: 886.1/km^{2} (2,295/sq mi)
- Time zone: UTC+01:00 (CET)
  - Summer (DST): UTC+02:00 (CEST)
- INSEE/Postal code: 77118 /77410
- ^{1} French Land Register data, which excludes lakes, ponds, glaciers > 1 km^{2} (0.386 sq mi or 247 acres) and river estuaries.

Claye-Souilly (French pronunciation: [klɛ suji]) is a commune in the Seine-et-Marne department in the Île-de-France region in north-central France.

== Demography ==
The inhabitants are called Clayois in French.

Historical population
Year	Pop.	±% p.a.
1968	4,363	—
1975	5,735	+3.98%
1982	8,152	+5.15%
1990	9,740	+2.25%
1999	10,152	+0.46%
2007	11,251	+1.29%
2012	11,299	+0.09%
2017	12,486	+2.02%
2023	13,353	+1.13%
Source: INSEE

== Personalities ==
- Jules de Polignac (1745–1817) was born here in 1745. He was the husband of Madame de Polignac, friend of Marie Antoinette.
- Mancini family

== See also ==
- Communes of the Seine-et-Marne department
