= Jules de Polignac, 1st Duke of Polignac =

Duke of Polignac

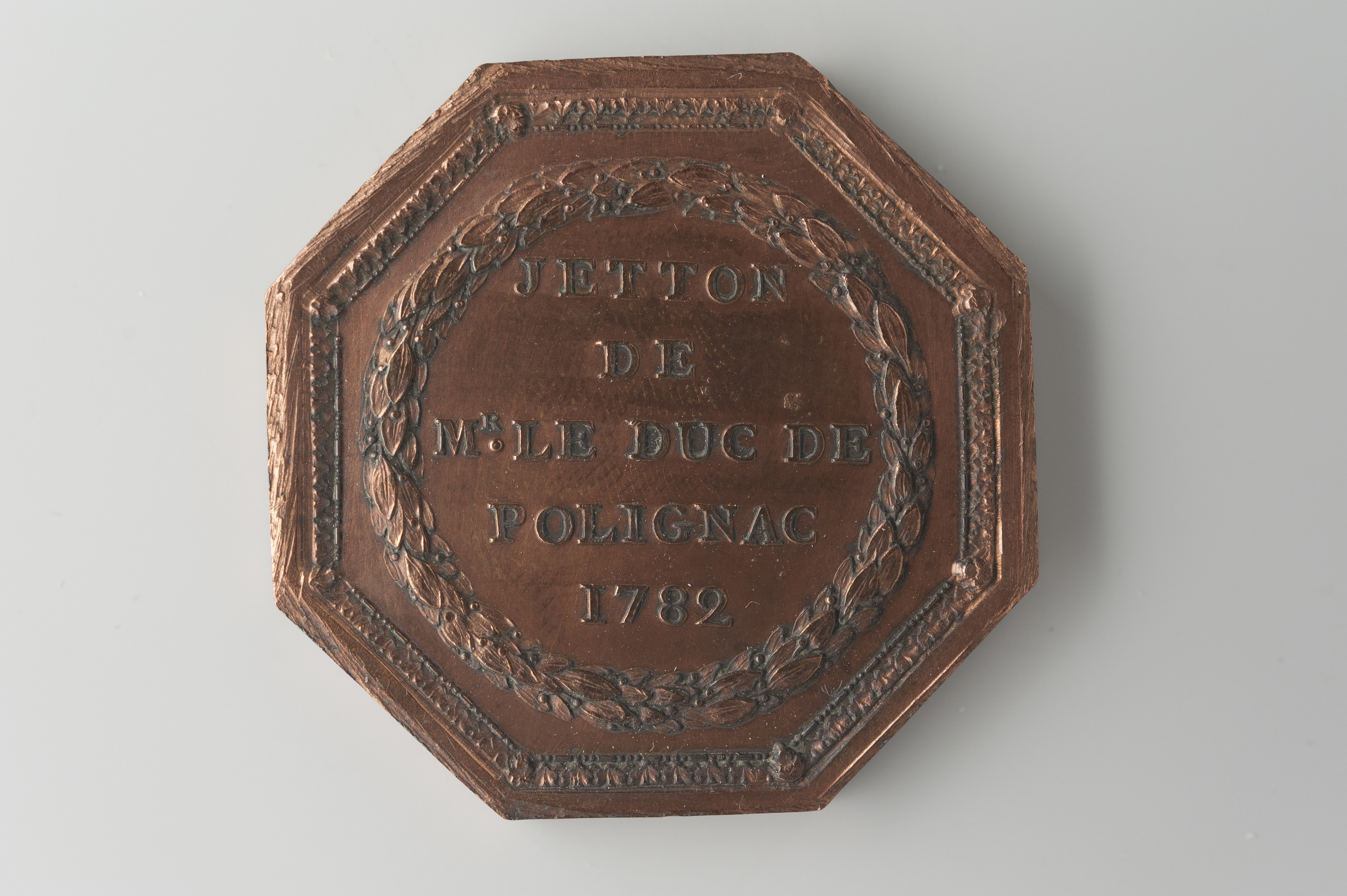
Jeton of Jules de Polignac, Duke of Polignac (1782)

Jules de Polignac, 1st Duke of Polignac (Armand Jules François; 7 June 1746 – 21 September 1817) was a French nobleman and the husband of Yolande de Polastron, a confidante of Marie Antoinette. He became the first Duke of Polignac in 1780. He died at the age of 71 in Little Russia, where he was given a manor by Catherine the Great.

== Life and marriage ==
He was born at Claye-Souilly to Louis Héracle Armand de Polignac, Marquis of Mancini (1717–1792), and his wife, Diane Adélaide Zéphirine Mancini (1726-1755), herself a granddaughter of the Duke of Nevers and the Duke of Noailles. He bore the title of Marquis of Mancini. He was the couple's fourth child of five, and their second son, and the brother of Diane de Polignac.

On 7 July 1767, he married Yolande Martine Gabrielle de Polastron. His wife was later the favourite of Marie Antoinette. As a result, he was created Duke of Polignac on 20 September 1780. At the revolution, he fled France and died in Russian Empire at the age of 71.

== Issue ==
1. Aglaé Louise Françoise Gabrielle de Polignac (7 May 1768 – 30 March 1803); married the Duke of Guiche and was nicknamed Guichette;
2. Armand Jules Marie Héracle de Polignac, 2nd Duke of Polignac (11 January 1771 – 1 March 1847); married Ida Johanna Lina van Neukirchen gen. Nijvenheim, with no issue;
3. Auguste Jules Armand Marie de Polignac, Prince of Polignac and later 3rd Duke of Polignac (14 May 1780 – 30 March 1847); married firstly Barbara Campbell (1788–1819) and had issue; secondly Mary Charlotte Parkyns (1792–1864) and had issue; was French Prime Minister from 1829 to 1830, under the government of Charles X of France;
4. Camille Henri Melchior de Polignac, Count of Polignac (27 December 1781 – 2 February 1855); married Marie Charlotte Calixte Alphonsine Le Vassor de la Touche (1791–1861) and had issue; they were the patrilineal ancestors of Pierre de Polignac, who married Princess Charlotte, Duchess of Valentinois, and was the father of Rainier III, Prince of Monaco, and grandfather of the current reigning Prince, Albert II.

== Ancestry ==
Ancestors of Jules de Polignac, 1st Duke of Polignac

16. Gaspard Armand de Polignac, vicomte de Polignac, marquis de Chalançon, baron de Randon
8. Louis-Armand III de Polignac
17. Claudine Françoise de Tournon
4. Scipion Sidoine de Polignac
18. François Scipion Grimoard de Beaurevoir, comte du Roure
9. Jacqueline de Grimoard de Beauvoir du Roure
19. Grésinde de Beaudan
2. Louis Héracle de Polignac, marquis d'Alençon
20. Louis I Charles de Mailly-Nesle
10. Louis de Mailly, comte de Mailly et de Rubempré
21. Jeanne de Monchy
5. Françoise de Mailly-Rubempré
22. Hélie de Sainte-Hermine
11. Anne Marie Françoise de Sainte-Hermine
23. Anne Madeleine Le Vallois de Villette
1. Jules, 1st Duke of Polignac
24. Lorenzo Mancini, barone Mancini
12. Philippe Jules Mancini
25. Girolama Mazzarini
6. Jacques Hyppolite, marquis Mancini
26. Claude Léonor Damas, marquis de Thianges
13. Diane Gabrielle Damas de Thianges
27. Gabrielle de Rochechouart de Mortemart
3. Diane Mancini-Mazarini
28. Anne de Noailles
14. Anne Jules de Noailles
29. Louise Boyer
7. Anne-Louise de Noaille
30. Ambroise François, duc de Bournonville
15. Marie-Françoise de Bournonville
31. Lucrèce Françoise de La Vieuville
