= Diane de Polignac =

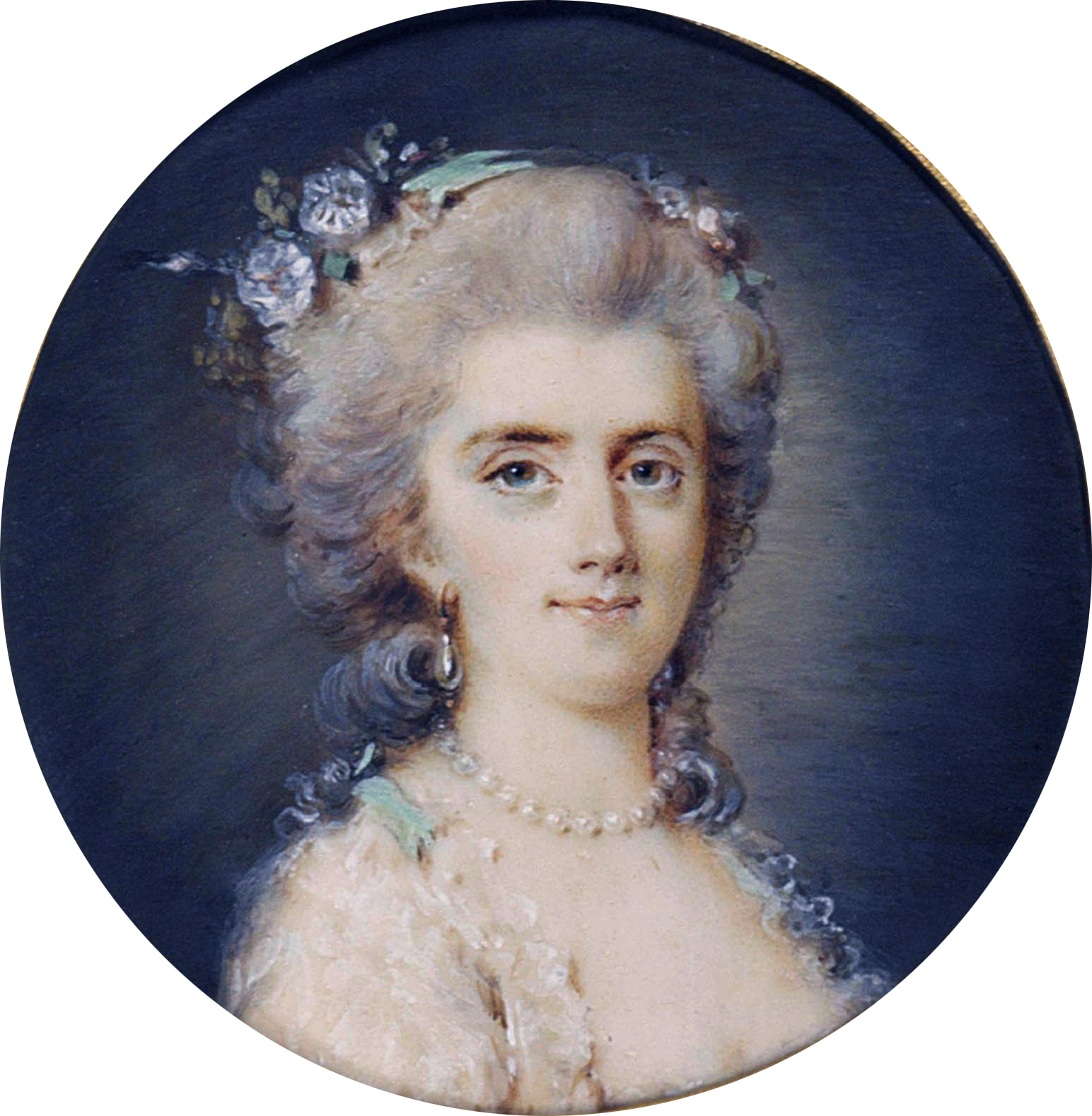
Diane de Polignac

Diane Louise Augustine de Polignac (1746–1818), was a French aristocrat, writer and courtier, and a lady-in-waiting to Princess Élisabeth of France.

== Biography ==
She was the daughter of Louis Héracle Armand, marquis de Polignac and Diane Adélaïde Zéphirine de Mancini, and never married; through her brother Jules, 1st Duke of Polignac, she was the sister-in-law to Yolande de Polastron. She had been introduced at court during the reign of Louis XV, served as reader and as lady-in-waiting to the countess of Artois in 1774–1778, and to Princess Élisabeth of France from 1778 until 1789. She was described as shy but clever and with a sarcastic wit; she was not liked by queen Marie Antoinette herself, but she was described as a driving force within the so-called "Polignac Clan", who exerted so many advantages through her sister-in-law's position as a favorite of the queen.

She emigrated with the rest of the Polignac family after the outbreak of the French Revolution in 1789.

== Cultural references ==
Diane de Polignac is a major character of the novel Les Adieux à la reine by Chantal Thomas (2002).

== Works ==
- Diane de Polignac, Journal d'Italie et de Suisse, Paris, 1789
- Diane de Polignac, Mémoires sur la vie de la duchesse de Polignac, Piccadilly, 1796
