= Antoine Louis Marie de Gramont, 8th Duke of Gramont =

French soldier and Diplomat

Antoine Louis Marie de Gramont
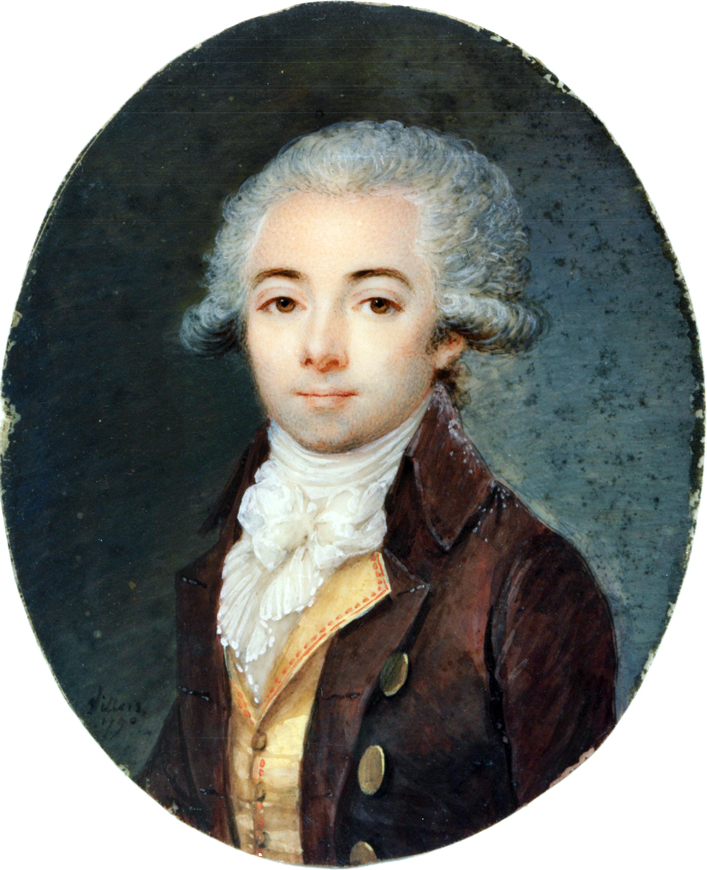

Duke of Gramont
- Reign: 1801 – 28 August 1836
- Predecessor: Antoine VII de Gramont
- Successor: Héraclius de Gramont, 9th Duke of Gramont
- Born: 17 August 1755; Château de Versailles
- Died: 28 August 1836 (aged 81); Paris, France
- Noble family: Gramont
- Spouse: Aglaé de Polignac (m. 1780; died 1803)
- Issue: Corisande de Gramont; Aglaé de Gramont; Héraclius de Gramont
- Father: Antoine-Adrien-Charles de Gramont
- Mother: Marie Louise Sophie de Faoucq

Antoine Louis Marie de Gramont, 8th Duke of Gramont (17 August 1755 – 28 August 1836), was the 8th Duke of Gramont, he was also Prince of Bidache. Antoine served as a French military officer, diplomat and parliamentarian.

== Early life and career ==
Antoine Louis Marie de Gramont was born on 17 August 1755, in Paris, France. Prior to his marriage he was known by the courtesy title of Comte de Louvigny.

On 16 April 1780, Antoine married Aglaé de Polignac (1768–1803), the daughter of Yolande de Polastron, Duchess of Polignac. The couple managed to reproduce 3 children; Corisande de Gramont (1782 – 1865), Aglaé de Gramont (1787 – 1842), and Héraclius de Gramont, 9th Duke of Gramont (1789 – 1855. Up to this point, he was accorded the style of Duc de Guiche. Since he was the heir presumptive to the Dukedom of Gramont. In 1801, he succeeded a cousin as the 8th Duke of Gramont and the Prince of Bidache.

He served as a captain in the Royal Garde du Corps before fleeing to Britain at the outset of the French Revolution. In 1805 he joined the British 10th Light Dragoons as a cornet, was promoted to lieutenant later that year and made captain of a troop in 1809, serving in the Peninsular War. He remained loyal to the House of Bourbon, becoming a military commander under Louis Antoine, Duke of Angoulême. He later served briefly as French ambassador to the Court of St James's under the Bourbon Restoration.

== See also ==
- Château de Bidache
- Duke of Gramont
- List of ambassadors of France to the United Kingdom

French nobility
| Preceded by Antoine, 7th Duke of Gramont | Duke of Gramont; 1801 - 1836 | Succeeded by Héraclius, 9th Duke of Gramont |
