= Noueilles =

- Commune
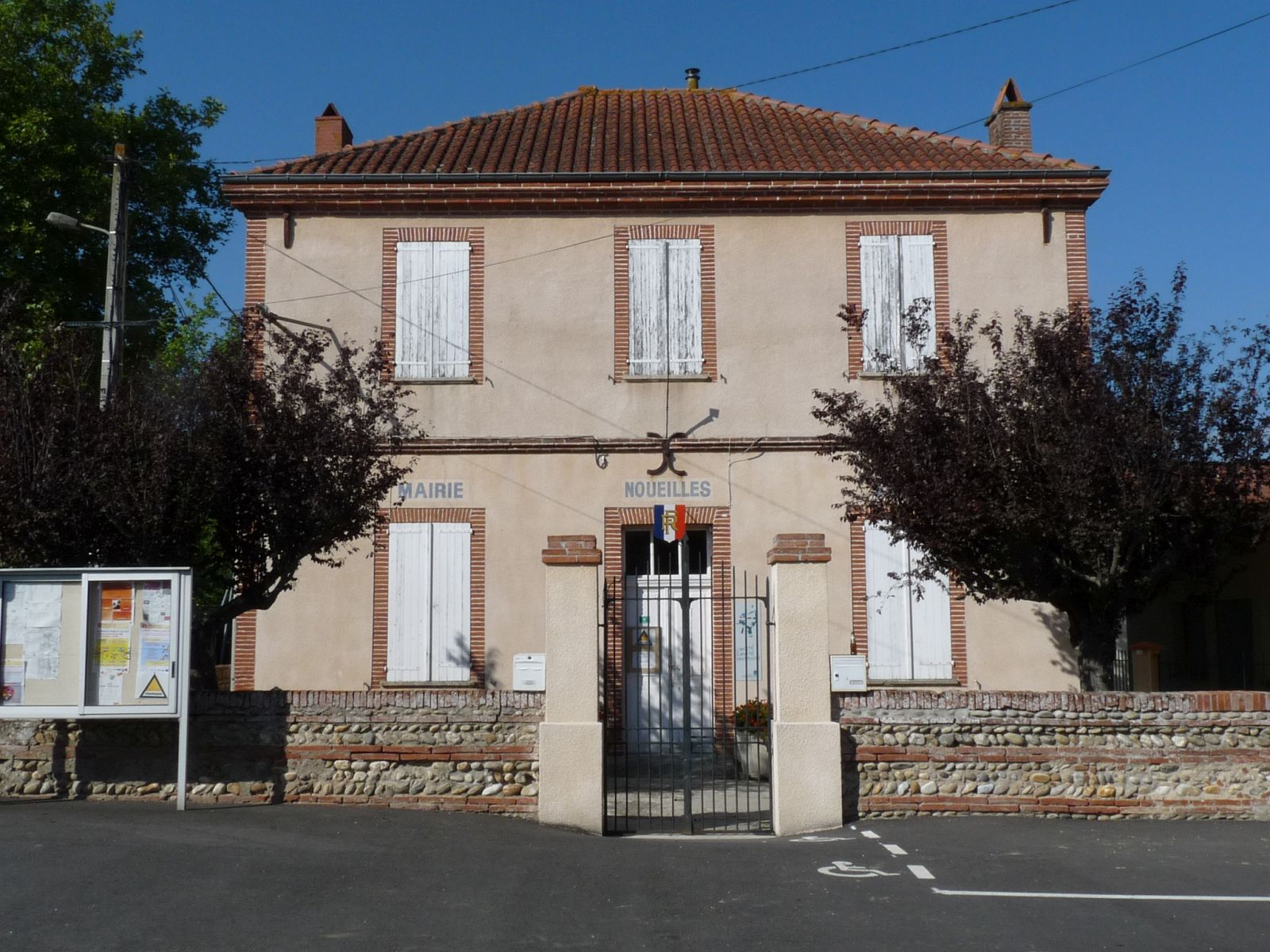
- The town hall in Noueilles
- Location of Noueilles
- Location within France Location within Occitanie
- Coordinates: 43°24′59″N 1°31′20″E
- Country: France
- Region: Occitania
- Department: Haute-Garonne
- Arrondissement: Toulouse
- Canton: Escalquens
- Intercommunality: CA Sicoval

Government
  - Mayor (2024–2026): Yannick Matter
- Area^{1}: 5.51 km^{2} (2.13 sq mi)
- Elevation: 220 m (720 ft)
- Highest elevation: 266 m (873 ft)
- Lowest elevation: 185 m (607 ft)
- Population (2023): 387
  - Density: 70.2/km^{2} (182/sq mi)
- Time zone: UTC+01:00 (CET)
  - Summer (DST): UTC+02:00 (CEST)
- INSEE/Postal code: 31401 /31450
- ^{1} French Land Register data, which excludes lakes, ponds, glaciers > 1 km^{2} (0.386 sq mi or 247 acres) and river estuaries.

Noueilles (French pronunciation: [nwɛj]; Occitan: Navelhas) is a commune in the Haute-Garonne department in southwestern France.

== Population ==
Historical population
Year	Pop.	±% p.a.
1968	108	—
1975	131	+2.80%
1982	129	−0.22%
1990	168	+3.36%
1999	234	+3.75%
2007	317	+3.87%
2012	359	+2.52%
2017	401	+2.24%
2023	387	−0.59%
Source: INSEE

== See also ==
- Communes of the Haute-Garonne department
