= Polignac's conjecture =

Conjecture about prime gaps

In number theory, Polignac's conjecture was made by Alphonse de Polignac in 1849 and states:

For any positive even number n, there are infinitely many prime gaps of size n. In other words: There are infinitely many cases of two consecutive prime numbers with difference n.

Although the conjecture has not yet been proven or disproven for any given value of n, in 2013 an important breakthrough was made by Yitang Zhang who proved that there are infinitely many prime gaps of size n for some value of n < 70,000,000. Later that year, James Maynard announced a related breakthrough which proved that there are infinitely many prime gaps of some size less than or equal to 600. As of April 14, 2014, one year after Zhang's announcement, according to the Polymath project wiki, n has been reduced to 246. Further, assuming the Elliott–Halberstam conjecture and its generalized form, the Polymath project wiki states that n has been reduced to 12 and 6, respectively.

For n = 2, it is the twin prime conjecture. For n = 4, it says there are infinitely many cousin primes (p, p + 4). For n = 6, it says there are infinitely many sexy primes (p, p + 6) with no prime between p and p + 6.

Dickson's conjecture generalizes Polignac's conjecture to cover all prime constellations.

In 1966, Chen Jing-run proved a slightly weaker version of Polignac's conjecture: there are infinitely many primes p such that p+k is either prime or a square-free number with at most 2 prime factors (a semiprime).

== Conjectured density ==
Let $\pi_n(x)$ for even n be the number of prime gaps of size n below x.

The first Hardy–Littlewood conjecture says the asymptotic density is of form

$$\pi_n(x) \sim 2 C_n \frac{x}{(\ln x)^2} \sim 2 C_n \int_2^x {dt \over (\ln t)^2}$$

where C_{n} is a function of n, and $\sim$ means that the quotient of two expressions tends to 1 as x approaches infinity.

C_{2} is the twin prime constant

$$C_2 = \prod_{p\ge 3} \frac{p(p-2)}{(p-1)^2} \approx 0.66016 18158 46869 57392 78121 10014\dots$$

where the product extends over all prime numbers p ≥ 3.

C_{n} is C_{2} multiplied by a number which depends on the odd prime factors q of n:

$$C_n = C_2 \prod_{q|n} \frac{q-1}{q-2}.$$

For example, C_{4} = C_{2} and C_{6} = 2C_{2}. Twin primes have the same conjectured density as cousin primes, and half that of sexy primes.

Note that each odd prime factor q of n increases the conjectured density compared to twin primes by a factor of $\tfrac{q-1}{q-2}$. A heuristic argument follows. It relies on some unproven assumptions so the conclusion remains a conjecture. The chance of a random odd prime q dividing either a or a + 2 in a random "potential" twin prime pair is $\tfrac{2}{q}$, since q divides one of the q numbers from a to a + q − 1. Now assume q divides n and consider a potential prime pair (a, a + n). q divides a + n if and only if q divides a, and the chance of that is $\tfrac{1}{q}$. The chance of (a, a + n) being free from the factor q, divided by the chance that (a, a + 2) is free from q, then becomes $\tfrac{q-1}{q}$ divided by $\tfrac{q-2}{q}$. This equals $\tfrac{q-1}{q-2}$ which transfers to the conjectured prime density. In the case of n = 6, the argument simplifies to: If a is a random number then 3 has a probability of 2/3 of dividing a or a + 2, but only a probability of 1/3 of dividing a and a + 6, so the latter pair is conjectured twice as likely to both be prime.
