= Battle of Eylau order of battle =

The following units and commanders fought in the Battle of Eylau of the Napoleonic Wars.

== French Army ==
Emperor Napoleon I of France

=== III Corps ===
Marshal Davout

| Divisions | Regiments and batteries |
|---|---|
| First Division General of Division Morand | 13th Light Infantry; 17th Line Infantry; 30th Line Infantry; 51st Line Infantry; 61st Line Infantry; two foot batteries (13 guns) |
| Second Division General of Division Friant | 33rd Line Infantry; 48th Line Infantry; 108th Line Infantry; 111th Line Infantry; one foot battery (8 guns) |
| Third Division General of Division Gudin | 12th Line Infantry; 21st Line Infantry; 25th Line Infantry; 85th Line Infantry; one foot battery (8 guns) |
| Light Cavalry General of Brigade Vialannes | 1st Chasseurs; 12th Chasseurs |
| Corps Artillery Reserve | three foot batteries, one horse battery (17 guns) |

=== IV Corps ===
Marshal Soult

| Divisions | Regiments and batteries |
|---|---|
| First Division General of Division Saint-Hilaire | 10th Light Infantry; 35th Line Infantry; 43rd Line Infantry; 55th Line Infantry; two foot batteries (12 guns) |
| Second Division General of Division Leval | 24th Light Infantry; 4th Line Infantry; 28th Line Infantry; 46th Line Infantry; 57th Line Infantry; two foot artillery batteries (12 guns) |
| Third Division General of Division Legrand | 26th Light Infantry; 18th Line Infantry; 75th Line Infantry; Tirailleurs Corses; Tirailleurs du Pô; two foot batteries (12 guns) |
| Corps Artillery Reserve | one foot battery (6 guns) |

=== VI Corps ===
Marshal Ney

| Divisions | Regiments and batteries |
|---|---|
| First Division General of Division Marchand | 6th Light Infantry; 39th Line Infantry; 69th Line Infantry; 76th Line Infantry |
| Second Division General of Division Gardanne | 25th Light Infantry; 27th Line Infantry; 50th Line Infantry; 59th Line Infantry |
| Light Cavalry General of Brigade Colbert | 10th Chasseurs; 9th Hussars |
| Corps Artillery Reserve | four foot batteries, two horse batteries (24 guns) |

=== VII Corps ===
Marshal Augereau

| Divisions | Regiments and batteries |
|---|---|
| First Division General of Division Jacques Desjardin † | 16th Light Infantry; 14th Line Infantry; 44th Line Infantry; 105th Line Infantry; one foot and one horse battery (8 guns) |
| Second Division General of Division Heudelet | 7th Light Infantry; 24th Line Infantry; 63rd Line Infantry; one foot and one horse battery (8 guns) |
| Light Cavalry General of Brigade Antoine Durosnel | 20th Chasseurs; one horse battery (4 guns) |
| Corps Artillery Reserve | two foot batteries (16 guns) |

=== Imperial Guard ===
| Divisions | Regiments and batteries |
|---|---|
| Infantry Marshal Lefebvre | 1st Grenadiers à pied; 1st Chasseurs à pied; 2nd Chasseurs à pied |
| Imperial Guard Cavalry Marshal Bessières | Grenadiers à Cheval; Chasseurs à Cheval de la Garde Impériale and Mamelukes |
| Artillery | two horse batteries (12 guns) |

=== Reserve Cavalry ===
Marshal Murat

| Divisions | Regiments and batteries |
|---|---|
| First Cuirassier Division General of Division Nansouty (absent) | 9th Cuirassiers; 11th Cuirassiers; one-half horse battery (3 guns) |
| Second Cuirassier Division General of Division d'Hautpoul † | 1st Cuirassiers; 5th Cuirassiers; 10th Cuirassiers; one-half horse battery (3 guns) |
| First Dragoon Division General of Division Klein | 1st Dragoons; 2nd Dragoons; 4th Dragoons; 14th Dragoons; 20th Dragoons; 26th Dragoons; one-half horse battery (3 guns) |
| Second Dragoon Division General of Division Grouchy | 3rd Dragoons; 4th Dragoons; 6th Dragoons; 10th Dragoons; 11th Dragoons; one-half horse battery (3 guns) |
| Third Dragoon Division General of Division Beaumont | 5th Dragoons; 8th Dragoons; 12th Dragoons; 16th Dragoons; 19th Dragoons; 21st Dragoons; one-half horse battery (3 guns) |
| Fourth Dragoon Division General of Division Sahuc | 17th Dragoons; 18th Dragoons; 19th Dragoons; 21st Dragoons; one-half horse battery (3 guns) |
| Light Cavalry Division General of Division Lasalle | 1st Hussars; 3rd Hussars; 5th Hussars; 13th Chasseurs |
| Light Cavalry Brigade General of Brigade Wathier | 11th Chasseurs; Bavarian 1st Kronprinz Chevau-léger |
| Corps Artillery Reserve | one horse battery (8 guns) |

== Russian Army ==
General of Cavalry Count Bennigsen

Chief of Staff: Quartermaster-General, Major General F.F. Steinheil

2nd Division - Lieutenant-General Count A.I. Ostermann-Tolstoy
| Brigade | Brigade Commanders | Units | Strength |
|---|---|---|---|
| Cavalry Bde | Major General Kozhin | Leib Cuirassiers | 5 sqds |
| Cavalry Bde | Major General Kozhin | Kargopol Dragoons | 5 sqds |
| Cavalry Bde | Major General Kozhin | Isum Hussars | 10 sqds |
| Cavalry Bde | Major General Kozhin | Ilowaiski №9 Cossacks | 5 sotnias |
| Cavalry Bde | Major General Kozhin | Efremov №3 Cossacks | 5 sotnias |
| 1st Infantry Bde | Major General A.Y. Masowski | Pavlovski Grenadiers | 3 bns |
| 1st Infantry Bde | Major General A.Y. Masowski | Rostov Musketeers | 3 bns |
| 2nd Infantry Bde | N. Sukin | Petsburg Grenadiers | 3 bns |
| 2nd Infantry Bde | N. Sukin | Eletz Musketeers | 3 bns |
| 3rd Infantry Bde | MG I.A. Diven | 1st Jaegers | 3 bns |
| 3rd Infantry Bde | MG I.A. Diven | 20th Jaegers | 3 bns |
| 1st Artillery Bde | Col Stavitsky | Battery Company Maj Osipov | 12 guns |
| 1st Artillery Bde | Col Stavitsky | Battery Company Maj Talyzin | 12 guns |
| 1st Artillery Bde | Col Stavitsky | Light Company May Efremov | 12 guns |
| 1st Artillery Bde | Col Stavitsky | Light Company Maj Voyeikov | 12 guns |
| 1st Artillery Bde | Col Stavitsky | 1st Horse Battery Col Stavitsky | 12 guns |
| Engineers | | 1st Pioneer Regiment, Pioneer Company of Major Dreyer | |

3rd Division - Lieutenant-General Baron von der Osten-Sacken
| Brigade | Brigade Commanders | Units | Strength |
|---|---|---|---|
| 3rd Cavalry Bde | Major General Count P.P. von der Pahlen | Little Russian Cuirassiers | 5 sqds |
| 3rd Cavalry Bde | Major General Count P.P. von der Pahlen | Kurland Dragoons | 5 sqds |
| 3rd Cavalry Bde | Major General Count P.P. von der Pahlen | Ilowaiski №10 Cossacks | 5 sotnias |
| 3rd Cavalry Bde | Major General Count P.P. von der Pahlen | Papuzin Cossacks | 5 sotnias |
| 1st Infantry Bde | Major General F.A. Ushakov | Taurida Grenadiers | 3 bns |
| 1st Infantry Bde | Major General F.A. Ushakov | Lithuanian Musketeers | 3 bns |
| 2nd Infantry Bde | Major General V.P. Titov | Koporsk Musketeers | 3 bns |
| 2nd Infantry Bde | Major General V.P. Titov | Muromsk Musketeers | 3 bns |
| 5th Infantry Bde | Major General Prince Dolgorukov | Chernigov Musketeers | 3 bns |
| 5th Infantry Bde | Major General Prince Dolgorukov | Dnepr Musketeers | 3 bns |
| 5th Infantry Bde | Major General Prince Dolgorukov | 21st Jaegers | 3 bns |
| Artillery Bde | Col von Bril | Battery Company Col von Bril | 12 guns |
| Artillery Bde | Col von Bril | Battery Company Maj Kotlyarov | 12 guns |
| Artillery Bde | Col von Bril | Light Company May Mitrofanov | 12 guns |
| Artillery Bde | Col von Bril | Light Company Maj Strazhev | 12 guns |
| Artillery Bde | Col von Bril | Horse Battery Col Pirogov | 12 guns |
| Artillery Bde | Col von Bril | Pontoon Company of Captain Khoven | |
| Engineers | | 1st Pioneer Regiment, 1st Pioneer Company of Major Afanas'ev | |

Fourth Division

Major General A.A. Somov

Cavalry

Brigade MG Baron Friedrich von Korff

- St. George (Order) Cuirassiers (5 sqs)
- Pskov Dragoons (5 sqs)
- Polish Horse (10 sqs)
- Grekov 9 Cossacks (5 sotnias)
- Grekov 18 Cossacks (5 sotnias)

Infantry

Brigade MG Somov

- Tula Musketeers (3 bns)
- Tengisk Musketeers (3 bns)

Brigade MG Arseniev 2

- Tobolsk Musketeers (3 bns)
- Polotzk Musketeers (3 bns)

Brigade MG Barclay de Tolly

- Kostroma Musketeers (3 bns)
- 3rd Jaegers (3 bns)

Artillery

Brigade Col Prince Yashvil 2

- Battery Company Maj Savitsky (12 guns)
- Battery Company Maj Kudryavtsev (12 guns)
- Light Company Maj Yushkov (12 guns)
- Light Company Maj Brimmer (12 guns)
- Light Company Maj Mikulin (12 guns)
- Horse Company Col Prince Yashvil 2 (12 guns)

Engineers

- Pontoon Company of Major Artsibashev
- 1st Pioneer Regiment, Miner Company of Captain Gebner 1

Fifth Division

Lieutenant General N.A. Tuchkov I

Cavalry

Brigade MG Prince Golitsyn

- Riga Dragoons (5 sqs)
- Kasan Dragoons (5 sqs)
- Elisabethgrad Hussars (10 sqs)
- Lithuanian Horse (10 sqs)
- Gordeev 1 Cossacks (5 sotnias)

Infantry

Brigade ?

- Sievsk Musketeers (3 bns)
- [Kaluga Musketeers (3 bns) Detached to Prussians; not present]

Brigade MG Ivan Leontiev

- Perm Musketeers (3 bns)
- Mohilev Musketeers (3 bns)

Brigade Col Priouda

- 24th Jaegers (3 bns)
- 25th Jaegers (3 bns)

Artillery

Brigade Col Count Sievers

- Battery Company Col Count Sievers (12 guns)
- Battery Company Maj Sigismund (12 guns)
- Light Company Maj Klingenberg (12 guns)
- Horse Company Maj Obleuhov 1st (12 guns)

Troops from the Sixth Division

From the Cavalry Brigade

- Alexandria Hussars (10 sqs)
- Popov 5 Cossacks (5 sotnias)

From the Infantry

Brigade MG K.F. Baggovut

- Starooskol Musketeers (3 bns)
- 4th Jaegers (3 bns)

From the Artillery Brigade

- Battery Company Lt-Col Vasil’ev (12 guns)
- Horse Company Col Merlin (12 guns)
- Light Company in two Light platoons (12 guns)

Seventh Division

Lieutenant General D.S. Dokhturov

Cavalry

Brigade MG Chaplits

- Moscow Dragoons (5 sqs)
- Ingermannland Dragoons (5 sqs)
- Pavlograd Hussars (10 sqs)
- Malachov Cossacks (5 sotnias)
- Andronov 1 Cossacks (5 sotnias)

Infantry

Brigade MG A.V. Zapol'skii

- Ekaterinoslav Grenadiers (3 bns)
- Moscow Musketeers (3 bns)

Brigade MG Straton-Potapov

- Vladimir Musketeers (3 bns)
- Voronezh Musketeers (3 bns)

Brigade MG Markov 1

- Pskov Musketeers (3 bns)
- Azov Musketeers (3 bns)
- 5th Jaegers (3 bns)

Artillery

Brigade Col Ermolov

- Battery Company Maj Ansio (12 guns)
- Battery Company Maj Shulman 2nd (12 guns)
- Light Company Maj Kondratiev (12 guns)
- Light Company Maj Panfilov (12 guns)
- Light Company Maj Krivtsov (12 guns)
- Horse Company Col Ermolov (12 guns)

Engineers

2nd Pioneer Regiment, Pioneer Company Maj Berg

Eighth Division

Lieutenant General P.K. Essen 3

Cavalry

Brigade MG P.F. Glebov-Streshnev

- Petersburg Dragoons (5 sqs)
- Livland Dragoons (5 sqs)
- Olviopol Hussars (10 sqs)
- Kieselev Cossacks (5 sotnias)
- Sysojev Cossacks (5 sotnias)

Infantry

Brigade MG Zakhar Dmitrievich Olsufiev

- Moscow Grenadiers (3 bns)

[* Viburg Musketeers Detached; fought with Prussian Corps]

Brigade MG Engelhardt 1

- Schlusselburg Musketeers (3 bns)
- Staroingermannland Musketeers (3 bns)

Brigade MG Levitsky

- Podolsk Musketeers (1 Musketeer bn)
- Archangelgorod Musketeers (3 bns)
- 7th Jaegers (3 bns)

Artillery

Brigade Col Nowak 1

- Battery Company Maj Nepeytsyn (12 guns)
- Battery Company Maj Kolotinski (12 guns)
- Battery Company Maj Tatpykov (12 guns)
- Battery Company Maj Bastian 2d (12 guns)
- Horse Company Col Nowak 1st (12 guns)

Engineers

2nd Pioneer Regiment, Miner Company of Maj Zapreev

Fourteenth Division

Major General Count N.M. Kamensky 2d

Cavalry

Brigade Col D.D. Sheplev [Brigade may not have been present]

- Finland Dragoons (5 squadrons)
- Mitau Dragoons (5 squadrons)
- Grodno Hussars (10 squadrons) [Not present. Arrived at the army the day after the battle]

Infantry

Brigade MG Alekseev

- Belozersk Musketeers (3 bns)
- Ryazan Musketeers (3 bns)

Brigade MG Gersdorf

- Uglits Musketeers (3 bns)
- Sofia Musketeers (3 bns)

Artillery

Brigade Col Pyotr Papkov

- Battery Company Col Papkov 2d (12 guns)
- Light Company Maj Vitovtov (12 guns)
- Light Company Maj Green (12 guns)

Engineers

Pontoon Company of Major Rutkovski

Prussian artillery temporarily attached to the Russian Army's Right Flank at Eylau

Maj von Brockhausen

- 12–pound Battery Brockhausen Nr 34 (8 guns)
- 12-pound Battery Kulikke Nr 37 (8 guns)
- 6-pound Battery Wedekind Nr 8 (10 guns)

== Prussian Corps ==
=== General Staff ===
- Commander-in-chief: Lieutenant General Anton Wilhelm von L'Estocq
  - General-Quartermaster-Lieutenant: Col Gerhard von Scharnhorst

=== Organization ===
Anton Wilhelm von L'Estocq's army at the Battle of Eylau
| Division | Division Commanders | Units | Strength |
|---|---|---|---|
| Avantgarde | | 50 cavalry from the Towarczys Regiment | 50 Towarczys |
| Avantgarde | | 40 cavalry from the Dragoon Regiment №6 "Auer" | 40 dragoons |
| Avantgarde | | Dragoon Regiment №6 "Auer" (9 sqs) | 9 sqds |
| Avantgarde | | Horse Battery №8 "Bredow" (8 guns) | 8 guns |
| 1st Division | Major General Friedrich Otto von Diericke | Grenadier Battalion "Fabecky" | |
| 1st Division | Major General Friedrich Otto von Diericke | Infantry Regiment №2 "Ruchel" | 2 bns |
| 1st Division | Major General Friedrich Otto von Diericke | Dragoon Regiment №7 "Baczko" | 10 sqds |
| 1st Division | Major General Friedrich Otto von Diericke | Cuirassier Regiment №4 "Wagenfeld" | 4 sqds |
| 1st Division | Major General Friedrich Otto von Diericke | ½ Horse Battery №13 "Rentzel" | 4 guns |
| 2nd Division | Major General Michael Szabszinski von Rembow | Grenadier Battalion "Schlieffen" | |
| 2nd Division | Major General Michael Szabszinski von Rembow | Infantry Regiment №11 "Schoning" | 2 bns |
| 3rd Division | Major General Kasimir von Auer | Vyborg Musketeer Regiment (Russian) | 3 bns |
| 3rd Division | Major General Kasimir von Auer | Towarczys Regiment | 10 sqds |
| 3rd Division | Major General Kasimir von Auer | ½ Horse Battery №10 "Decker" | 4 guns |
| Rearguard | Major General Moritz von Prittwitz | ½ Fusilier Battalion №21 "Stutterheim" | 2 coys |
| Rearguard | Major General Moritz von Prittwitz | 1st Battalion, Hussar Regiment №5 "Prittwitz" | 5 sqds |
| Rearguard | Major General Moritz von Prittwitz | ½ Horse Battery №6 "Sowinski" | 4 guns |

== Sources ==
- Cowan, Coley E. "Winter Battle: Eylau 1807". Strategy & Tactics Magazine, number 228 (May/June 2005). ISSN 1040-886X
- Smith, Digby. The Napoleonic Wars Data Book. London: Greenhill, 1998. ISBN 1-85367-276-9
- (in Russian) Vasil'ev, AA, "COMPOSITION of ALLIED TROOPS at EYLAU: List of the Allied Russian and Prussian troops participating in the Battle of Preussisch-Eylau January 26 and 27 (February 7 and 8) 1807", Imperator No. 11 pp. 11–14 (2007)
