= Alphonse de Polignac =

French mathematician

Alphonse de Polignac (1826–1863) was a French mathematician and aristocrat. He is known for Polignac's Conjecture.

== Biography ==
His father, Jules de Polignac (1780-1847) was prime minister of Charles X until the Bourbon dynasty was overthrown in the July Revolution of 1830. Alphonse was born in London during his father's time as ambassador to the United Kingdom. In 1849 he was admitted to Polytechnique and went onto serve in the Crimean War as an artillery officer, achieving the rank of Captain.

He was also a historian, a poet, a musician, and authored a translation of the play Faust by Goethe.

His work in mathematics mainly focused on Number Theory and he specifically worked with prime numbers.

== Polignac's Conjecture ==
In his first year at Polytechnique Polignac formulated his eponymous conjecture, which states that:

For every positive integer k, there are infinitely many prime gaps of size 2k.

== Other work in Mathematics ==
In the same paper presented to the Academy of Sciences where he proposed his famous conjecture Polignac also formulated the following false conjecture.

Any odd number is equal to the power of 2 plus a prime number.

This conjecture has many counterexamples, the smallest being 127. Indeed, Paul Erdős proved that it fails for an infinite arithmetic progression of integers. On the other hand, Nikolai Pavlovich Romanov in 1934 proved Romanov's theorem asserting that the set of numbers that are the sum of a power of 2 and a prime number has positive lower asymptotic density.

== See also ==
- de Polignac's formula
- Polignac family
