= Polignac family =

French noble family

Arms of the Polignac family

The House of Polignac is an ancient and historically powerful French noble family that took its name from the château de Polignac, of which they had been sieurs since Carolingian times. Agnatically, the ruling family of Monaco represents a cadet, junior branch of the House of Polignac.

== History ==
In 1385, the male line became extinct, but the heiress married Guillaume, sire de Chalancon, who assumed the name and the coat of arms of Polignac family. Jules de Polignac (1746–1817) became the first Duke of Polignac in 1780. In 1820, the family also gained the title of Princeps Romanus, a papal title recognized two years later in the Kingdom of France. In 1838, the elder line of the family also acquired the hereditary title of Fürst (Prince) in the Kingdom of Bavaria, thus officially becoming part of the German nobility. The descendants of Prince Auguste Jules Armand Marie (1780–1847) bear the title Prince[ss] de Polignac. Other male members of the family bear the title Comte de Polignac, and the females the surname de Polignac.

== Notable family members ==
- Melchior de Polignac (1661–1742), French diplomat, Catholic cardinal and neo-Latin poet
- Jules de Polignac (1746–1817), became the first Duke of Polignac
- Gabrielle de Polastron, Duchess of Polignac (1749–1793), wife of the first Duke of Polignac
- Jules, Prince of Polignac (1780–1847), promulgator of the July Ordinances
- Alphonse de Polignac (1826–1863), French mathematician and number theorist
- Camille Armand Jules Marie, Prince of Polignac (1832–1913), Confederate general at the Battle of Sabine Crossroads
- Prince Edmond de Polignac (1834–1901), composer
- Winnaretta Singer, princess de Polignac (1865–1943)
- Armande de Polignac (1876–1962), composer
- Jeanne, Comtesse Charles de Polignac (1882–1966), singer and salonnière
- Pierre de Polignac (1895–1964), father of Rainier III, Prince of Monaco
