= Alexander Lvovich Davydov =

Russian general (1773–1833)

- Russian: Александр Львович Давыдов
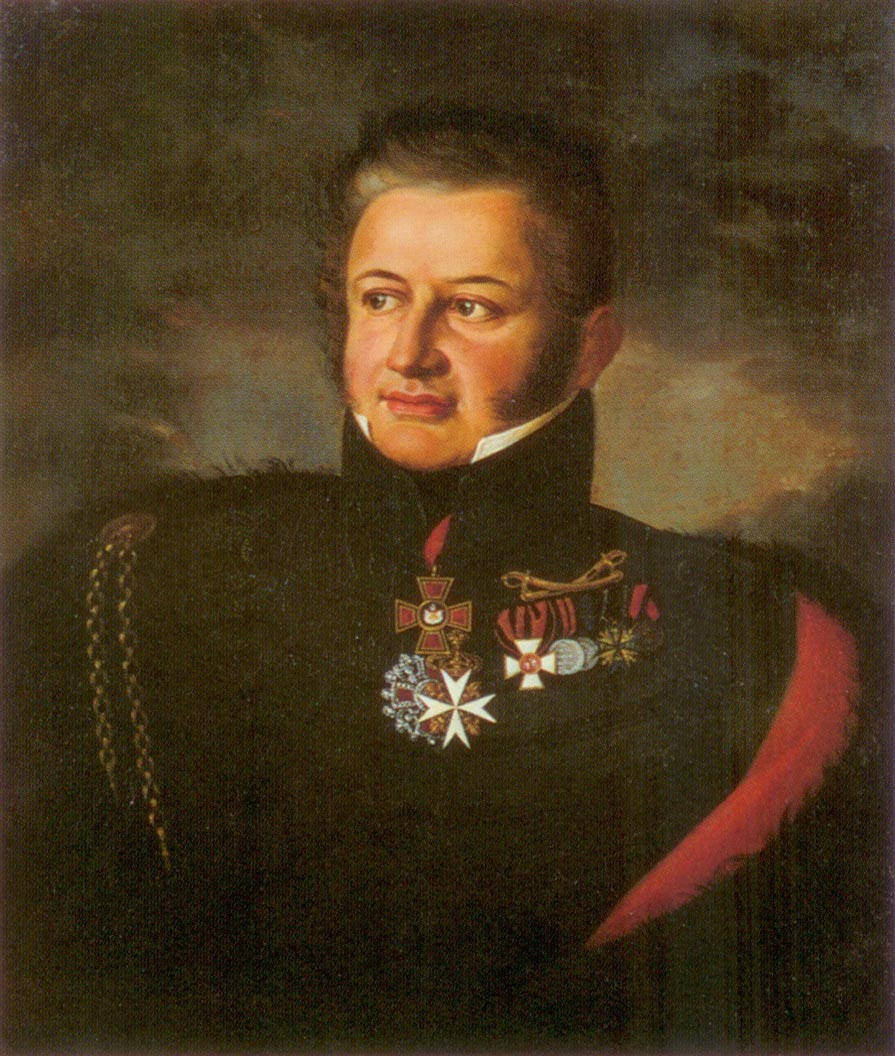
- Portrait by George Dawe, 1820s
- Born: 1773; Russian Empire
- Died: 1833 (aged 59–60)
- Military career
- Allegiance: Russia
- Branch: Imperial Russian Army
- Rank: Major general
- Unit: cavalry
- Conflicts: War of the Third Coalition; Battle of Austerlitz; French invasion of Russia; Battle of Tarutino; Battle of Maloyaroslavets; War of the Sixth Coalition; Battle of Lützen; Battle of Bautzen; Battle of Dresden; Battle of Kulm; First Battle of Bar-sur-Aube; Battle of Troyes; Battle of Arcis-sur-Aube; Battle of Fère-Champenoise; Battle of Paris
- Awards: Order of St. Vladimir; Order of St. George; Golden Sword for Bravery; Pour le Mérite; Order of St. Anna

Alexander Lvovich Davydov (Russian: Александр Львович Давыдов; 1773–1833) was a Russian major-general who served in the era of the Napoleonic Wars.

== Biography ==
Davydov was born to the prominent Russian noble family of the Davydovs, and was the half-brother of the noted general Nikolay Raevsky. He started his military career around the age of 12, when he enlisted in the Lifeguard Preobrezhansky Regiment as a sergeant. However, he soon transferred to the Life Guard Horse Regiment, of which, in 1799, he became a cornet and several years later, on 7 June 1804, a colonel (polkovnik). Some months later, in 1805, he fought at the Battle of Austerlitz and in the years 1807-09 he served in Poland and in Finland with the Grodno Hussar Regiment. However, on 23 January 1810 he took a discharge, due to poor health. In 1812, amidst the French invasion of Russia by Napoleon, Alexander Davydov returned to the army and served under Mikhail Miloradovich at the battles of Tarutino, Maloyaroslavets, Vyazma, and lastly Krasny. For his efforts at Krasny, he received the Order of St. Vladimir (3rd class). In the ensuing year, in 1813, he served at the battles of Lützen, Bautzen, Dresden (received Order of St. George, 4th class) and lastly Kulm. 1814 would be his last year of military action, and he served at the battles of Bar-sur-Aube, Troyes, Arcis-sur-Aube, Fère-Champenoise and lastly Paris. On 16 June 1815, Alexander Davydov was promoted to the rank of major-general, with, as Prof. Alexander Mikaberidze adds, having "seniority" for this rank since 29 January 1814.

== Sources ==
- "Давыдов Александр Львович". polki.mirpeterburga.ru (in Russian).
- Mikaberidze, Alexander (2005). Russian Officer Corps of the Revolutionary and Napoleonic Wars. Savas Beatie. ISBN 978-1611210026.
- История кавалергандов и Кавалергардского Ея Величества полка, с 1724 по 1-е июля 1851 года. Санкт-Петербург, Военная типография, 1851 г. (in Russian)
- Pushkin, Alexander (1963). Shaw, J. Thomas (ed.). The Letters of Alexander Pushkin, Volume 1. Indiana University Press.
