= Prince Pierre, Duke of Valentinois =

Prince Pierre
- Duke of Valentinois
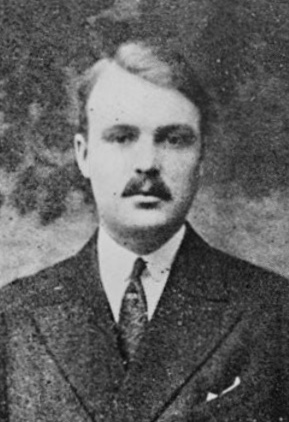
- Prince Pierre de Polignac in 1923
- Born: Pierre Marie Xavier Raphaël Antoine Melchior de Polignac; 24 October 1895; Château de Kerscamp, Morbihan, France
- Died: 10 November 1964 (aged 69); American Hospital, Neuilly-sur-Seine, Paris, France
- Burial: Chapel of Peace, Monaco
- Spouse: Charlotte, Hereditary Princess of Monaco (m. 1920; div. 1933)
- Issue: Princess Antoinette, Baroness of Massy; Rainier III, Prince of Monaco
- House: Polignac (by birth); Grimaldi (by marriage)
- Father: Count Maxence de Polignac
- Mother: Susana de la Torre y Mier

Prince Pierre (Pierre Grimaldi) of Monaco, Duke of Valentinois (born Pierre Marie Xavier Raphaël Antoine Melchior de Polignac; 24 October 1895 – 10 November 1964) was the father of Rainier III of Monaco. He was a promoter of art, music, and literature in Monaco and served as the head of the country's delegation to the United Nations Educational, Scientific, and Cultural Organization (UNESCO) and to the International Olympic Committee.

== Background and early life ==
Count Pierre Marie Xavier Raphaël Antoine Melchior de Polignac was born at the Château de Kerscamp, Hennebont, Morbihan, France. He was the fourth son and youngest child of Count Maxence Melchior Édouard Marie Louis de Polignac (1857–1936) and his Mexican-born wife, Susana Mariana Estefanía Francisca de Paula del Corazón de Jesús de la Torre y Mier (1858–1913), whom he wed in Paris in 1881. Mexican politician Ignacio de la Torre y Mier was Pierre's maternal uncle. Pierre was a member of a cadet branch of the House of Polignac, one of France's most renowned ducal families, noble since at least the 12th century, duke in 1780, peer in 1817. His male-line descendants are still in line of succession for the title of Duke of Polignac.

Pierre was a descendant of Marie Antoinette's favourite, Yolande de Polastron, duchesse de Polignac. A veteran of World War I, Pierre had fraternized in artistic social circles in France, becoming a good friend of Marcel Proust and Jean Cocteau.

== Prince ==
Pierre married civilly on 19 March and religiously on 20 March 1920, in Monaco, Princess Charlotte of Monaco, the illegitimate but adopted daughter of Louis II of Monaco by Marie Juliette Louvet. He changed his name and coat of arms to those borne by the House of Grimaldi by Monegasque ordinance issued on 18 March 1920, the day before his wedding. He had become a subject of the Sovereign Prince of Monaco, also by Monegasque Sovereign Ordinance, on 29 February 1920. From the date of the religious wedding the court of Monaco referred to him, jure uxoris, as Duke of Valentinois. That title had been conferred upon his wife as heir presumptive on 20 May 1919. His surname and arms were altered by ordinance shortly after he became a Monegasque citizen, to ensure that his dynastic issue would bear the surname of Grimaldi in compliance with Article I of Monaco's house law.

== Civic role ==
Initially, the couple inaugurated a new focus in the principality on culture, as patrons of the arts. Serge Diaghilev and the prince agreed that financial sponsorship of the former's dance troupe, the Ballets Russes, offered an opportune means to raise the national prestige of Pierre and the international prestige of the principality. In 1922 the Société des bains de mer de Monaco (SBM), the Blanc family corporation licensed to operate Monaco's casinos, contracted with the impresario and his dancers to become Monte Carlo's resident ballet corps, eventually bringing the resort city international renown for entertainment beyond gambling.

In 1926 Pierre solicited press agent Elsa Maxwell to improve the image of the principality. She conducted a media operation to pivot the principality's reputation from that of an "interior" site of fancy gaming tables and midnight catering for wealthy adults to a family-oriented outdoors venue, offering roomy beachside cabanas, golfing, a circus and, in 1929, the first Monaco Grand Prix. Pierre persuaded his father-in-law to allow the nation's streets to be converted annually into an auto race course for the event.

While the increased tourist traffic swelled SBM's 1928 profits to 98 million French francs, it also drove up citizen and worker demand for reforms, which Louis II publicly decried, while delegating Pierre to meet with the leaders of the National Council, all of whose members resigned that year in protest. Infuriated by failure to obtain workplace improvements at SBM, on 24 March 1929 600 Monegasques stormed the palace, prompting Pierre to negotiate with them and present their demands for constitutional and labor reform to the monarch, who agreed to fresh elections and other concessions that forestalled revolution.

In 1953 he was among the royal guests at the Coronation of Queen Elizabeth II representing his son, the Prince of Monaco.

== Marriage and family ==
According to James Lees-Milne, a British writer and friend of Pierre's, his unhappy arranged marriage was complicated by his homosexuality and Princess Charlotte's affairs. In the mid-1920s, the couple unofficially separated.

Prince Pierre and Princess Charlotte were judicially separated on 20 March 1930 at Paris, and in a case titled "Princesse héréditaire Grimaldi de Monaco c. Prince Pierre Grimaldi de Polignac" were divorced by ordinance of Prince Louis II on 18 February 1933. The divorce was confirmed by a Paris tribunal in December of that year. One magazine story reported that "The union ended ... under circumstances which prompted the temperamental father-in-law to vow he would call out the Monégasque army if the prince ever set foot in the principality again." The banishment from Monaco was lifted in April 1933, and Prince Pierre thereafter received an annuity of 500,000 francs a year.

He and his wife had two children:

- Princess Antoinette, Baroness of Massy (1920–2011)
- Rainier III, Prince of Monaco (1923–2005)

== Death ==
Monogram of Prince Pierre

Prince Pierre died on 10 November 1964, of cancer, at the American Hospital in Neuilly-sur-Seine, Paris, France.

Life magazine in 1947 described Prince Pierre as "a slender and graceful gallant who wears his coat cape-fashion across his shoulders. His manners are exquisite; his voice so cultivated as to be practically inaudible".

== Honours ==
- France: Grand Officer of the Legion of Honour
- Italy: Grand Cross of the Order of Merit of the Italian Republic
- Monaco: Grand Officer of the Order of Saint-Charles
- Sweden: Commander Grand Cross of the Order of the Polar Star – 1923
- United Kingdom: Recipient of the Queen Elizabeth II Coronation Medal

== Sources ==
- Scheijen, S. (2009). Diaghilev: A Life. London: Profile Books. p. 151-152. ISBN 9780199751495.
