= Yolande de Polastron =

French aristocrat and courtier (1749–1793)

- Duchesse de Polignac
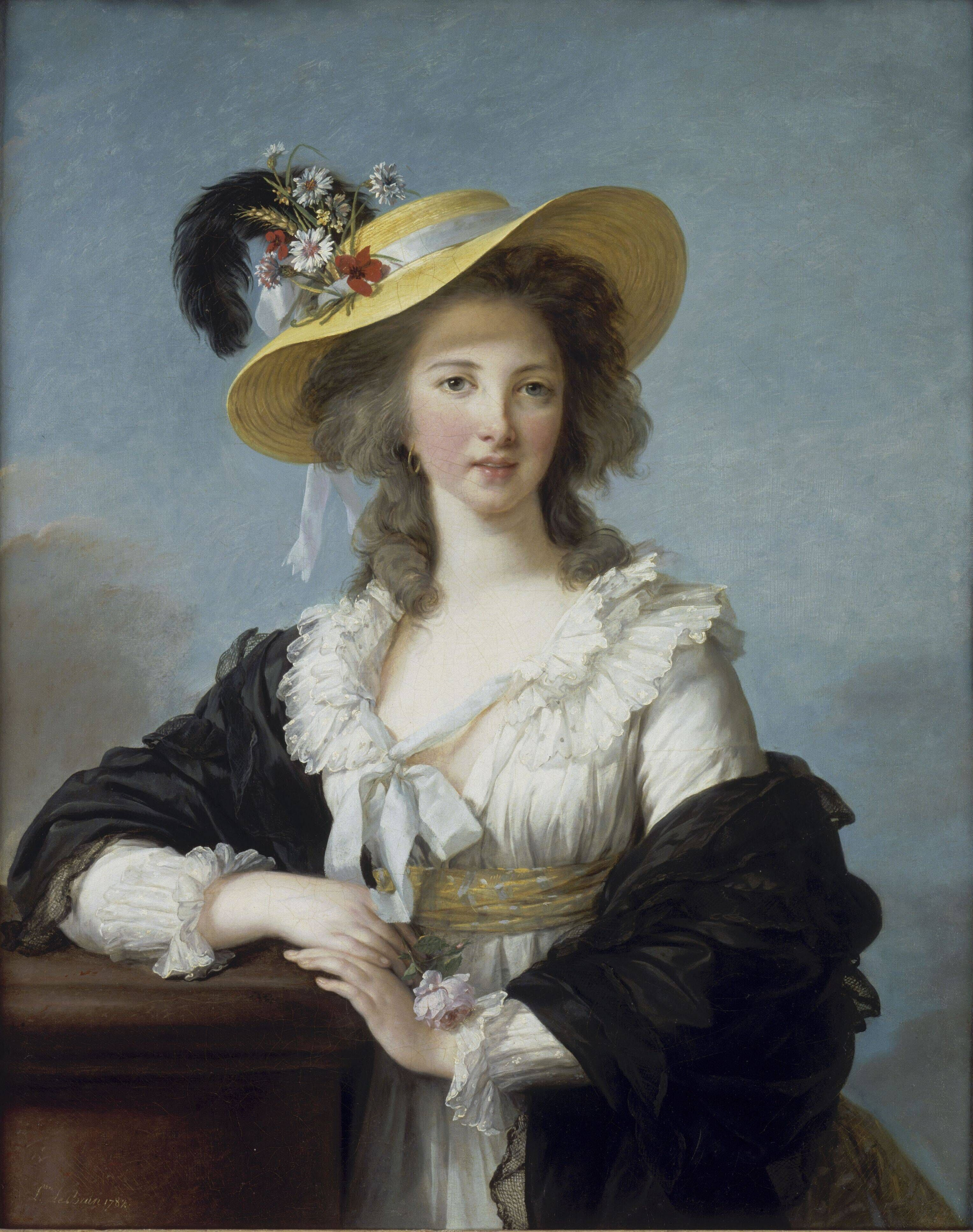
- Portrait by Elisabeth Vigée-Lebrun, 1782. (styled after Self-portrait in a Straw Hat)
- Born: 8 September 1749; Paris, France
- Died: 9 December 1793 (aged 44); Vienna, Austria, Holy Roman Empire
- Spouse: Jules de Polignac (m. 1767)
- Issue: Aglaé de Polignac; Armand de Polignac; Jules de Polignac; Camille de Polignac
- Father: Jean François Gabriel de Polastron, Duc de Polastron
- Mother: Jeanne Charlotte Hérault

Yolande de Polastron, Duchess of Polignac (Yolande Martine Gabrielle; 8 September 1749 – 9 December 1793) was the favourite of Marie Antoinette, whom she met when she was presented at the Palace of Versailles in 1775, the year after Marie Antoinette became the Queen of France. She was considered one of the great beauties of pre-Revolutionary society, but her extravagance and exclusivity earned her many enemies.

== Biography ==
Yolande Martine Gabrielle de Polastron was born in Paris in the reign of King Louis XV. Her parents were Jean François Gabriel, Comte de Polastron, seigneur de Noueilles, Venerque and Grépiac (1722-1794), who served as French ambassador to Switzerland, and his wife, Jeanne Charlotte Hérault de Vaucresson (1726-1753), who via marriage became the Duchesse de Polastron. As was customary with aristocrats, most of whom bore more than one Christian name, she was generally known by the last of her names (Gabrielle). She was born into a family of ancient aristocratic lineage, but by the time of Gabrielle's birth the family, despite its exalted ancestry, was encumbered by many debts, and its lifestyle was far from luxurious.

While Gabrielle was still an infant, her parents moved the family to Château of Noueilles, in the province of Languedoc in southern France. When Gabrielle was 3, her mother died and her welfare was entrusted to an aunt, who arranged for her to receive a convent education.

At the age of 16, Gabrielle was betrothed to Jules François Armand, comte de Polignac, marquis de Mancini (1746–1817), whom she married on 7 July 1767, a few months before her 18th birthday. Polignac's family had a "well-bred" ancestry similar to Gabrielle's family, and was in equally uncomfortable financial straits. At the time of his marriage, Polignac was serving in the Régiment de Royal Dragons ("1er régiment de dragons"), on an annual salary of 4,000 livres. Within a few years of the marriage, Jules and Gabrielle had two children: a daughter Aglaé and a son. Two more sons followed several years later, including Jules, prince de Polignac, who became the prime minister of France in 1829, under Charles X.

=== Appearance ===
Most surviving portraits show her to be pretty. One historian said that Gabrielle, in her portraits by Louise Élisabeth Vigée Le Brun (see Self-portrait in a Straw Hat), generally looks "like some harvested and luscious fruit." She had dark brunette hair, very pale white skin, and, perhaps most unusually, lilac or violet-coloured eyes.

Compiling the contemporary accounts of her, one modern historian has summarised her physical appearance thus:

Her particular freshness of appearance [gave] an impression of "utter naturalness" ... with her cloud of dark hair, her big eyes, her neat nose and pretty pearly teeth, [she] was generally likened to a Madonna by Raphael.

=== Versailles ===
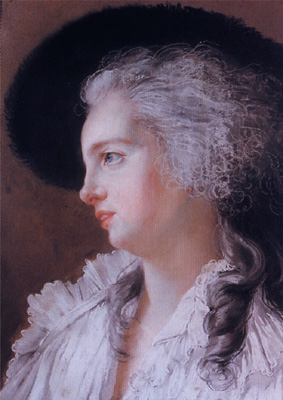
Marie Antoinette was instantly "dazzled" by the duchess of Polignac

When her sister-in-law Diane de Polignac invited her to the court at Versailles, Gabrielle came with her husband and was presented at a formal reception in the Hall of Mirrors in 1775, at which time she was formally presented to the Queen of France, Marie Antoinette, who was instantly "dazzled" by her, and invited her to move permanently to Versailles. The cost of maintaining oneself at the court of Versailles was ruinous, and Gabrielle replied that her husband did not have the money to finance a permanent move to the palace. Determined to keep her new favourite by her side, the Queen agreed to settle the family's many outstanding debts and to find an appointment for Gabrielle's husband.

Once she was installed in the palace, near the Queen's apartments, Gabrielle also won the friendship of the King's youngest brother, the comte d'Artois, and the approval of King Louis XVI, who was grateful for her calming influence on his wife and who encouraged their friendship. Gabrielle was, however, resented by other members of the royal entourage, particularly the Queen's confessor and her chief political adviser, the Austrian ambassador. In a letter to the Queen's mother, Empress Maria Theresa, the ambassador wrote, "It is almost unexampled that in so short a time, the royal favour should have brought such overwhelming advantages to a family."

Gabrielle became the undisputed leader of the Queen's exclusive circle and ensured that few entered without her approval. Gabrielle was considered by many of her friends to be elegant, sophisticated, charming, and entertaining.

Together with Pierre Victor, Baron de Besenval, Gabrielle played a key role in settling the affair: An Incident at the Opera Ball on Mardi Gras in 1778.

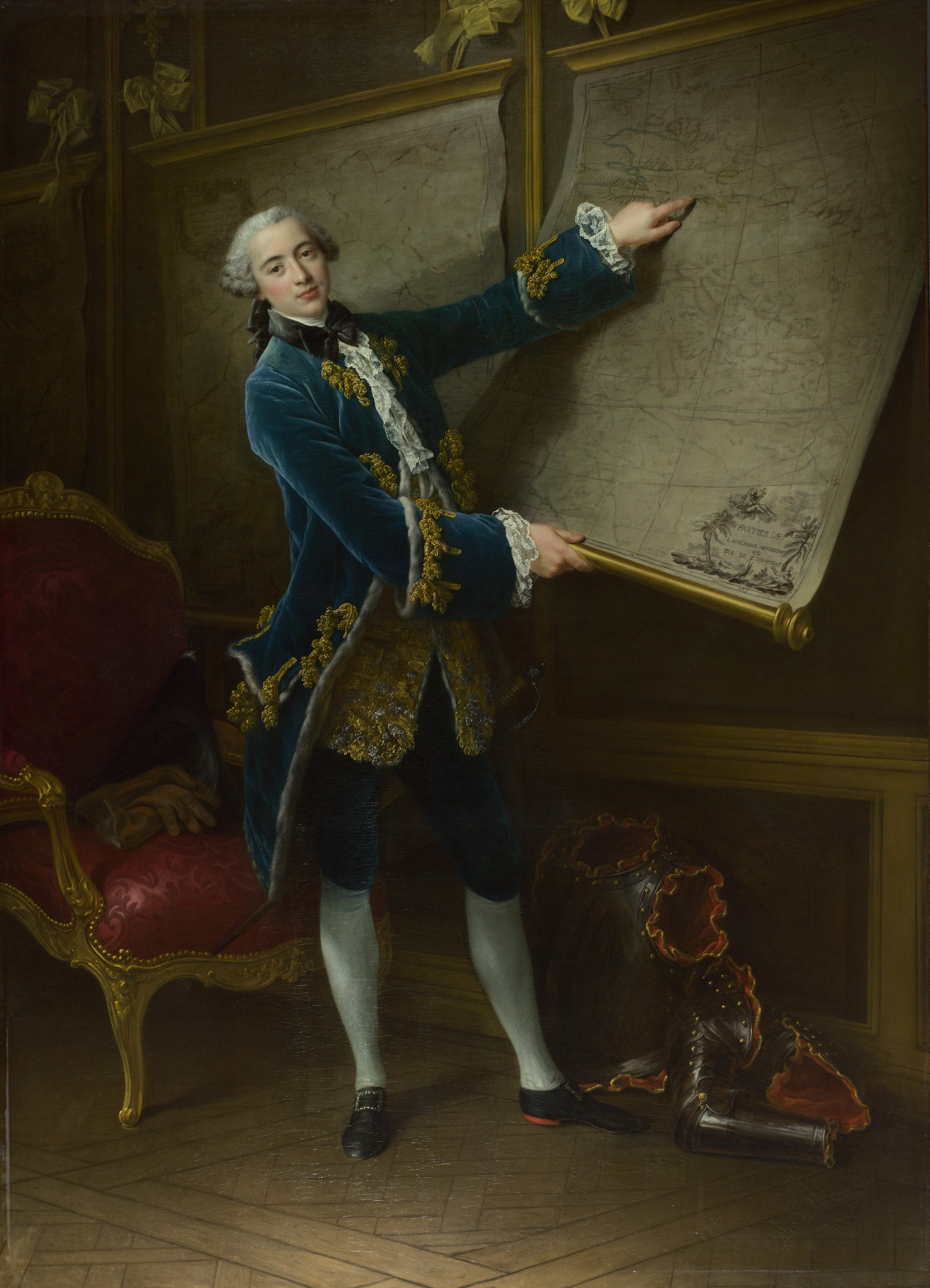
Portrait of the Comte de Vaudreuil by François-Hubert Drouais, 1758

The entire Polignac family benefited enormously from the Queen's considerable generosity, but their increasing wealth and lavish lifestyle outraged many aristocratic families, who resented their dominance at court. Ultimately, the Queen's favouritism towards the Polignac family was one of the many causes which fueled Marie Antoinette's unpopularity with some of her husband's subjects (especially Parisians) and members of the politically liberal nobility. In 1780, Gabrielle's husband was given the title Duke of Polignac, thus making Gabrielle a Duchess, a further source of irritation to the courtiers.

By the late 1780s, thousands of pornographic pamphlets alleged that Gabrielle was the Queen's lesbian lover, including accusations that the pair had engaged in tribadism. Although there was no evidence to back up these accusations, they did immeasurable damage to the prestige of the monarchy, especially given the deep-rooted suspicion of homosexuality held by the bourgeoisie and urban working-classes at the time.

Several historians have suggested that reports of Gabrielle's extravagance have been greatly exaggerated, and they point out that, during her 14-year residency at Versailles she spent as much as Louis XV's mistress, Madame de Pompadour, had spent in one. Others have contended that to some extent she deserved her negative reputation because, despite the inaccuracies of the claims that she was sexually disreputable, other criticisms of her were valid: she was cold, self-centred, self-indulgent, and masked a love of gossip and intrigue behind a sweet-toned voice and flawless manners. This argument was particularly championed by the author and biographer Stefan Zweig, who wrote:

"Not even Madame de Maintenon, not even the Pompadour, cost as much as this favourite, this angel, with downcast eyes, this modest and gentle Polignac. Those who were not themselves swept into the whirlpool, stood at the marge contemplating it with astonishment ... [as] the Queen's hand was invisibly guided by the violet-eyed, the lovely, the gentle Polignac."

Another critic is Elisabeth de Feydeau.

=== Governess of the Children of France ===
In 1782, the Governess of the Children of France, Victoire de Rohan, princesse de Guéméné and wife of Henri Louis de Rohan, had to resign her post due to a scandal caused by her husband's bankruptcy. The Queen replaced the princess with Gabrielle. This appointment generated outrage at court, where it was felt Gabrielle's social status was insufficient for a post of that magnitude.

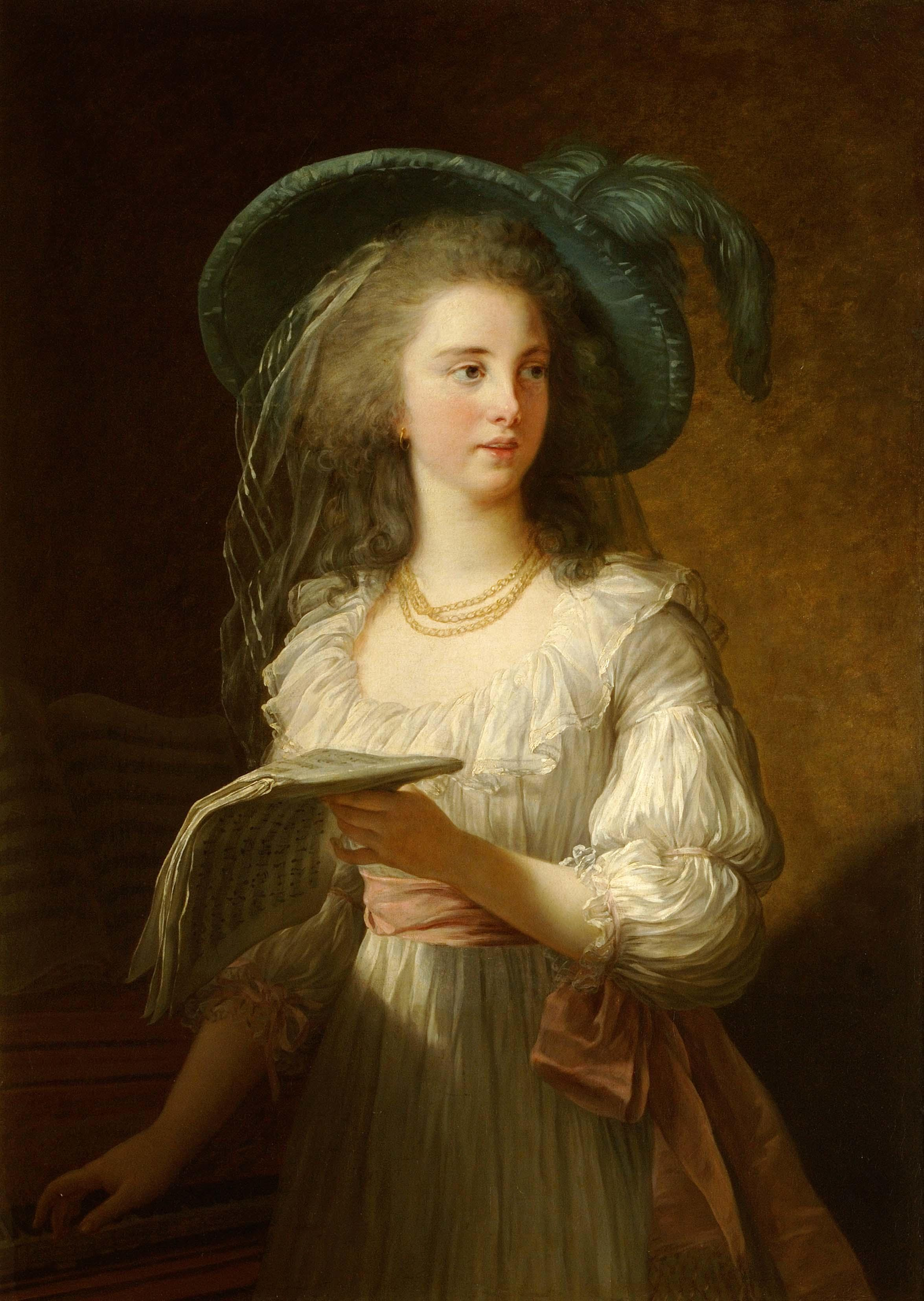
A more formal portrait of the Duchesse de Polignac by Élisabeth Vigée-Lebrun

As a result of her new position, Gabrielle was given a 13-room apartment for herself in the palace. Technically, this was within the acceptable limits of etiquette, but the size of the apartment was unprecedented, particularly in a place as overpopulated as Versailles. Royal governesses had previously been quartered in four- or five-room apartments. Gabrielle was even given her own cottage in Marie Antoinette's favorite pastoral refuge, the Hameau de la Reine, built in the 1780s on the grounds of the Petit Trianon in the park of Versailles.

Gabrielle's marriage was cordial, if not successful; it was typical of aristocratic arranged marriages. For many years, she was apparently in love with the captain of the Royal Guard, Joseph Hyacinthe François de Paule de Rigaud, Comte de Vaudreuil, although many of her friends considered Vaudreuil too domineering and too uncouth for the kind of society in which Gabrielle moved. It was rumored at Versailles that Gabrielle's youngest child was actually fathered by Vaudreuil. However, the exact nature of Gabrielle's relationship with Vaudreuil has been debated by some historians, who doubted the liaison was sexual. This theory has recently been resurrected by Catholic novelist and commentator Elena Maria Vidal. Despite the claims that they were lovers, Gabrielle showed no hesitation in distancing herself from Vaudreuil whenever she felt her own social position was threatened by the Queen's dislike of the manipulative courtier. There are hardly any letters surviving from the couple, who either in reality may not have been sufficiently close to write to each other when separated, or may just have been very careful in masking their communications for political reasons. Their letters may have been subsequently destroyed either by themselves or others for precaution's sake.

=== Children ===
- Aglaé Louise Françoise Gabrielle de Polignac (7 May 1768, Paris; died 30 March 1803 in Edinburgh). Nicknamed Guichette by her family, married Antoine duc de Gramont et Guiche at Versailles on 11 July 1780
- Armand Jules Marie Héracle de Polignac, duc de Polignac (11 January 1771, Paris; died 1 March 1847 in Paris), second duc de Polignac
- Jules, prince de Polignac (10 November 1780, Paris; died 30 March 1847 in Saint-Germain-en-Laye), third duc de Polignac. Married firstly Barbara Campbell (1788–1819); secondly Mary Charlotte Parkyns (1792–1864); was French Prime Minister from 1829 to 1830, in the government of Gabrielle's friend Charles X, the former comte d'Artois.
- Camille Henri Melchior de Polignac, comte de Polignac (27 December 1781 in Versailles; died 2 February 1855 in Fontainebleau), married Marie Charlotte Calixte Alphonsine Le Vassor de la Touche (1791–1861)

=== In England ===
Perhaps due to the Queen's intense dislike of the Comte de Vaudreuil, whom she found rude and irritating, Gabrielle's influence over Marie Antoinette temporarily waned after 1785, when the Queen's second son was born. The Queen was becoming increasingly dissatisfied with the ambition of her favourites, especially when they championed a politician whom the Queen despised. Marie Antoinette confided to another lady-in-waiting, Henriette Campan, that she was "suffering acute dissatisfaction" over the Polignacs. Wrote Campan: "Her Majesty observed to me that when a sovereign raises up favourites in her court she raises up despots against herself". Eventually, Gabrielle felt Marie Antoinette's displeasure and decided to visit friends in England, particularly Georgiana, Duchess of Devonshire, who was the leader of London high society and one of Gabrielle's closest friends. During her time in England, she earned the nickname "Little Po," due to her delicate constitution.

=== Revolution ===
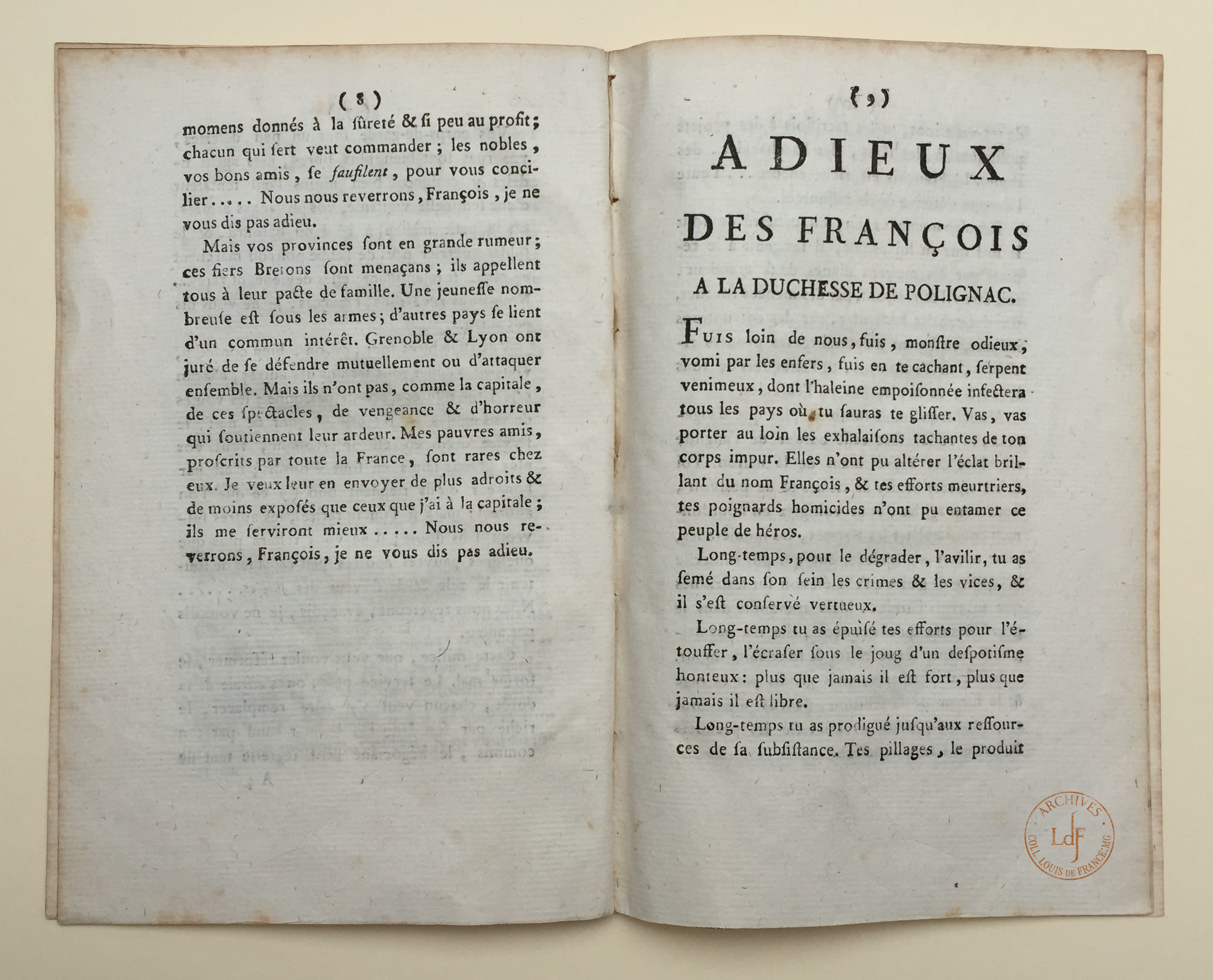
Pamphlet against the duchesse de Polignac printed in 1789, after her escape to Switzerland

On September 14, 1788, anti-monarchy protests renewed, and in October 1788, protestors demanded money for fireworks, they demanded that anyone in a carriage dismount and salute to Henri IV, and they also burned effigies representing Yolande de Polastron, and then the troops were deployed and they dispersed the crowds with great bloodshed in the Place de la Grève.

The months leading up to the July 1789 outbreak of the French Revolution saw the Queen and the duchesse de Polignac become close again. Politically, Gabrielle and her friends supported the ultra-monarchist movement in Versailles, and Gabrielle became increasingly important in royalist intrigues as the summer progressed, usually in partnership with her friend, the comte d'Artois, the King's youngest brother.

The marquis de Bombelles, a diplomat and politician, remembered Gabrielle's ceaseless work to promote hardline responses against the emergent revolution. Together with the baron de Breteuil, Bombelles' godfather and former diplomat, and the comte d'Artois, Gabrielle persuaded Marie Antoinette to work against the King's popular minister of finances, Jacques Necker. However, without the necessary military support to crush the insurrection, Necker's dismissal fuelled the serious violence in Paris, culminating in the attack on the Bastille fortress.

After the storming of the Bastille on 14 July 1789, all the members of the Polignac family went into exile. On Louis XVI's express orders, the comte d'Artois left, as did Breteuil; Gabrielle went with her family to Switzerland, where she kept in contact with the Queen through letters. After Gabrielle had left, the care of the royal children was entrusted to the Marquise de Tourzel.

=== Exile ===
After her departure from France, she and her family lived an ambulating life, travelling from one place to another. She kept in contact with Marie Antoinette through correspondence, by which her place of residence can be traced. The Polignac family travelled through Switzerland, Turin, Rome and Venice (where she attended the wedding of her son in March 1790), and from Italy to Vienna in Austria in 1791. She was reportedly present in the Austrian Netherlands during the Flight to Varennes, and in July 1791, she is noted as one of the extravagantly dressed women who attended the émigrée court of the count of Provence in Koblenz. The emigree court in Koblenz was however dissolved after the Battle of Valmy in 1792, and she returned to Austria, where she died.

Gabrielle developed a terminal illness while living in Switzerland, although she had arguably been in poor health for several years. She died in Austria in December 1793, shortly after hearing of Marie Antoinette's execution. Gabrielle's family simply announced that she had died as a result of heartbreak and suffering. Most historians have concluded that she died of cancer, and contradictory royalist reports of her death suggested consumption as an alternative cause.

No specific mention of her disease was made in the various allegorical pamphlets which showed the Angel of Death descending to take the soul of the still-beautiful duchesse de Polignac. Her beauty and early death became metaphors for the demise of the old regime, at least in early pamphlets. In subsequent family correspondence, the duchess's beauty was a much-emphasised point.

== Progeny ==
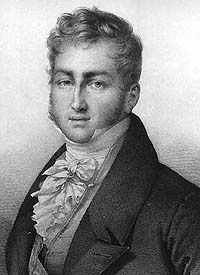
Her son Jules Auguste Armand Marie de Polignac, prince de Polignac.

Gabrielle was the mother of Jules, prince de Polignac, who became Prime Minister for Charles X (the former comte d'Artois) in 1829. She was also the mother of Aglaé de Polignac, duchesse de Guiche, who died in 1803, in an accidental fire. Two of her grandsons were Camille Armand Jules Marie, Prince de Polignac and Prince Edmond de Polignac. Her great-great-grandson, Count Pierre de Polignac, was the father of Rainier III, Prince of Monaco. Her descendants can also be found in France and in Russia, where her granddaughter, daughter of "Guichette", married a nobleman, Aleksandr Lvovich Davydov.

== Legacy ==
Gabrielle de Polastron's mark in history can be seen in history books, novels, movies, and other media.

=== In popular culture ===
- She is one of the major characters in The Rose of Versailles (1979), a shōjo manga/anime created by Riyoko Ikeda
- She is played by Claudia Cardinale in the two-part film La Révolution française (1989)
- She is portrayed by Rose Byrne in the film Marie Antoinette (2006)
- She is portrayed by Virginie Ledoyen in the film Farewell, My Queen (2012)
- She is portrayed by Liah O'Prey in the television series Marie Antoinette (2022)

=== In history ===
Her critics among historians have argued that the Duchesse de Polignac typified the aristocratic hangers-on at the court of Versailles before the French Revolution and that she embodied exclusivity, obliviousness, and selfish extravagance of the ruling class. However, more sympathetic historians, such as Pierre de Nolhac and the Marquis de Ségur, agree that most of the problems originated with her entourage and that she was certainly no worse than many of the aristocrats or favourites who had preceded her at Versailles.

Assessments of her character aside, it is generally agreed that she was one of the key figures in the ultra-monarchist movement throughout the early summer of 1789, acting under the influence of her friend, the Comte d'Artois.

== In cinema and television ==
- Antoinette (USA, 1938) by Ruth Hussey
- Marie Antoinette - Reine de France (1956) by Marina Berti
- Marie-Antoinette (1975) by Corinne Le Poulain
- Les Années Lumière (1988) by Claudia Cardinale
- L’été de la Révolution (1989) by Yolande Folliot
- Marie-Antoinette, Reine d'un seul amour (1989) by Isabelle Gélinas
- L'Autrichienne (1989)
- Marie-Antoinette (2006) by Rose Byrne
- Marie-Antoinette, la Véritable Histoire (2006) by Marie-Ève Beaulieu
- Les Adieux à la Reine (2012) by Virginie Ledoyen
- Marie Antoinette (2022) by Liah O’Prey
- "Rose of versailles" (1979)

Court offices
Preceded by The Princess of Guéméné	Governess of the Children of France; 1782–1789	Succeeded by The Marquise of Tourzel
