= Louis César, Count of Vexin =

French count; legitimized son of Louis XIV (1672–1683)

Louis César
- Légitimé de France; Count of Vexin
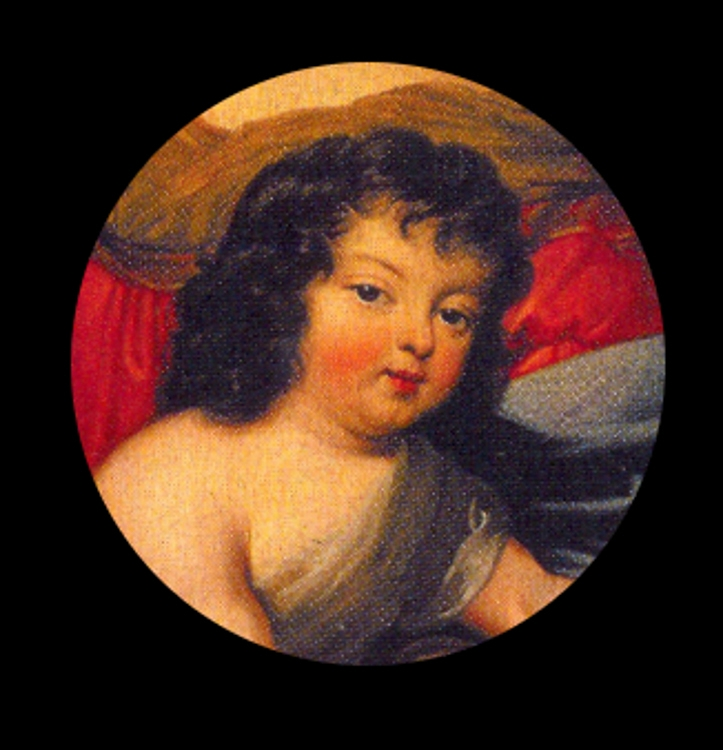
- Vexin, ca. 1675
- Born: Louis César de Bourbon; 20 June 1672; Château du Génitoy, France
- Died: 10 January 1683 (aged 10); Paris, France
- Burial: Abbey of Saint-Germain-des-Prés, France
Names
- Louis César de Bourbon, Légitimé de France
- Father: Louis XIV
- Mother: Madame de Montespan

Louis César de Bourbon, Légitimé de France, Count of Vexin (Génitoy, 20 June 1672 – Paris, 10 January 1683) was a son of Louis XIV and his mistress Madame de Montespan. He was the Abbot of Saint-Denis and of Saint-Germain-des-Prés.

== Birth ==
Louis César, born at the château du Génitoy, was the second son born to Louis XIV and Madame de Montespan. He was named after Julius Caesar, as his older brother Louis Auguste de Bourbon had been named after Augustus and the later born Louis Alexandre de Bourbon was named after Alexander the Great.

Louis César was born at a time when the court was in mourning for Princess Marie-Thérèse of France, known as la petite Madame, who had died in March 1672.

== Upbringing ==
Louis César would grow up with his older brother Louis-Auguste in the care of Madame Scarron in a house on the rue de Vaugirard in Paris. This house had been purchased by the king specifically for his illegitimate children. The next year, while his father was on a military tour at Tournai, he was joined by a sister, Louise Françoise de Bourbon, born in June; Louis César and his parents were present, as well as the Queen Marie Thérèse d'Autriche and Madame Scarron.

Scarron was greatly attached to Louis Auguste, far more than his siblings Louise Françoise and Louis César. On 19 December 1673, Louis XIV officially recognised his children with Montespan with Letters Patent from the Parlement de Paris. This made all these children Enfants Légitimés de France, Legitimate Children of France with the style of His Highness.

With this legitimisation, Louis César received the title Count of Vexin, an ancient title dating from the 10th century. His brother became the duc du Maine and his sister Mademoiselle de Nantes.

In the following two years, he was joined by two more siblings: Françoise Marie de Bourbon, born May 1677, and Louis Alexandre de Bourbon, born June 1678 at Clagny.

Around the time of Françoise Marie's birth, his mother was supposedly involved in the Affaire des Poisons which made her lose favour with the king. The king sought comfort with another mistress, Angélique de Fontanges. After that time, Louis César spent more time with his mother at her private residence, the Château de Clagny.

== Health problems ==
Vexin had a crooked spine since birth. This caused him to limp and was not helped by one of his shoulders being higher than the other. His father, who adored him, decided the child was to be destined for the church. His father bestowed the title of Abbot of Saint Denis on his son. The Royal Cathedral of Saint Denis, Cathédrale royale de Saint-Denis, was the traditional burial place of the kings of France since the 7th century and was one of the wealthiest churches in France.

Despite being the Abbot of Saint Denis, he was too young to carry out any duties and thus remained at the court of his father whilst under the care of Scarron. In 1674, another sister joined the family: Louise Marie Anne was born in November 1674 and was created Mademoiselle de Tours after her legitimisation in 1676.

The doctors at court tried to help with Louis-César's condition but failed using the awful treatments. After such treatments, Louis César's general condition worsened after 1675. He was watched over by his mother and his maternal aunt, the marquise de Thianges. He would never be a strong child.

In 1678, it was thought that he may die; again he was "treated" but did not do anything other than keep him alive. His condition was so bad that he was bedridden for days at a time.

== Death ==
Louis César died in Paris in 1683 at the age of 10, and was buried at the Abbey of Saint-Germain-des-Prés. His mother was distraught.

== Ancestry ==
Ancestors of Louis César, Count of Vexin

8. Henry IV of France
4. Louis XIII of France
9. Marie de' Medici
2. Louis XIV of France
10. Philip III of Spain
5. Anne of Austria
11. Margaret of Austria
1. Louis César, Count of Vexin
12. Gaspard de Rochechouart, marquis de Mortemart
6. Gabriel de Rochechouart, duc de Mortemart
13. Louise de Maure, comtesse de Maure
3. Madame de Montespan
14. Jean de Grandseigne, marquis de Marsillac
7. Diane de Grandseigne
15. Catherine de La Béraudière, dame de Villenon
