= Subsidiary structures of the Palace of Versailles =

Five subsidiary structures historically associated with the development of the Palace of Versailles are located in its vicinity: the Ménagerie, the Pavillon de la Lanterne, the Trianon de Porcelaine, the Grand Trianon (also known as the Marble Trianon), and the Petit Trianon. Among these, the Ménagerie and the Trianon de Porcelaine have since been destroyed, though they are well-documented in historical records. These structures are frequently regarded as significant examples of 17th and 18th century architecture.

== Ménagerie ==
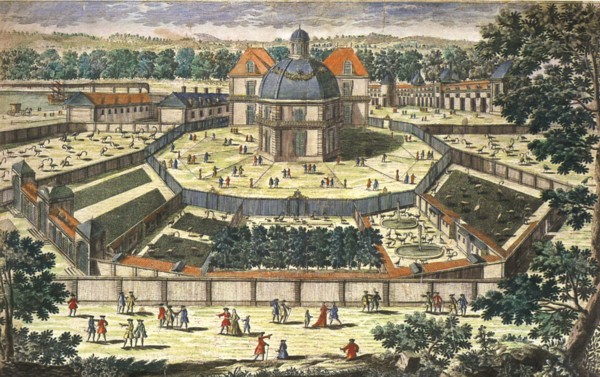
Ménagerie de Versailles, 1662–64; 1698–1700

The Ménagerie was commissioned by Louis XIV in 1662 and completed in 1664. Situated at the southern end of the transverse branch of the Grand Canal, it was constructed as part of the king’s growing interest in zoology, in particular in Aristotelian theology through the works of French physician and philosopher Claude Perrault. The Ménagerie consisted of a complex of buildings centered around an octagonal, two-story pavilion, and it quickly became a popular attraction for courtiers and visitors to the palace. According to Louis-Jean-Marie Daubenton in Denis Diderot's Encyclopédie, Louis XIV once received an African elephant as a diplomatic gift from King Afonso VI of Portugal:

In 1668 the king of Portugal sent an elephant from the kingdom of Congo to the king of France. It was seventeen years old and measured six and a half feet from the ground to the top of its back. The elephant lived in the menagerie at Versailles for thirteen years and only grew a further foot, no doubt because the change in climate and food had stunted its growth; so it measured just seven and a half feet when the gentlemen of the Royal Academy of Sciences carried out their description of it.

The ground floor of the central pavilion featured a salon frais, decorated with shellwork to evoke the appearance of a grotto. The upper floor comprised a series of rooms, each opening onto a balcony that overlooked the surrounding animal enclosures.

In 1697, the 12-year-old Marie Adélaïde of Savoy, married Louis XIV's grandson, Louis, Duke of Burgundy. The following year, she was given the Ménagerie as a gift. Between 1698 and 1700, the interior was redecorated in the Rococo style associated with the early reign of Louis XV.

The Ménagerie was sold during the post-Revolutionary land sales and was ultimately demolished in 1801. Today, the Pavillon de la Lanterne is the only remaining structure associated with the original complex and is currently undergoing restoration.

== Trianon de Porcelaine ==
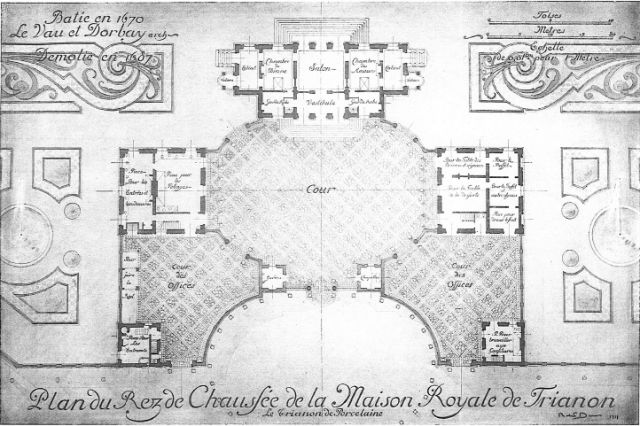
Plan of the Trianon de Porcelaine

The Trianon de Porcelaine was a short-lived pleasure pavilion located at the northern end of the transverse arm of the Grand Canal in the gardens of the Palace of Versailles, France. Designed by architects Louis Le Vau and François d'Orbay, it was constructed between 1669 and 1670 for King Louis XIV and his mistress, the Marquise de Montespan.

The complex consisted of a central pavilion surrounded by four smaller buildings. Its most distinctive feature was its exterior cladding of blue and white earthenware tiles, designed to imitate porcelain; an early example of chinoiserie in European architecture.

Due to the fragility of the tiles, which were prone to cracking and detachment in cold weather, the structure required continual maintenance. In 1687, following the end of the king's relationship with Madame de Montespan, the Trianon de Porcelaine was demolished. The site remained favoured by Louis XIV, and the Grand Trianon was subsequently constructed there.

== Grand Trianon ==
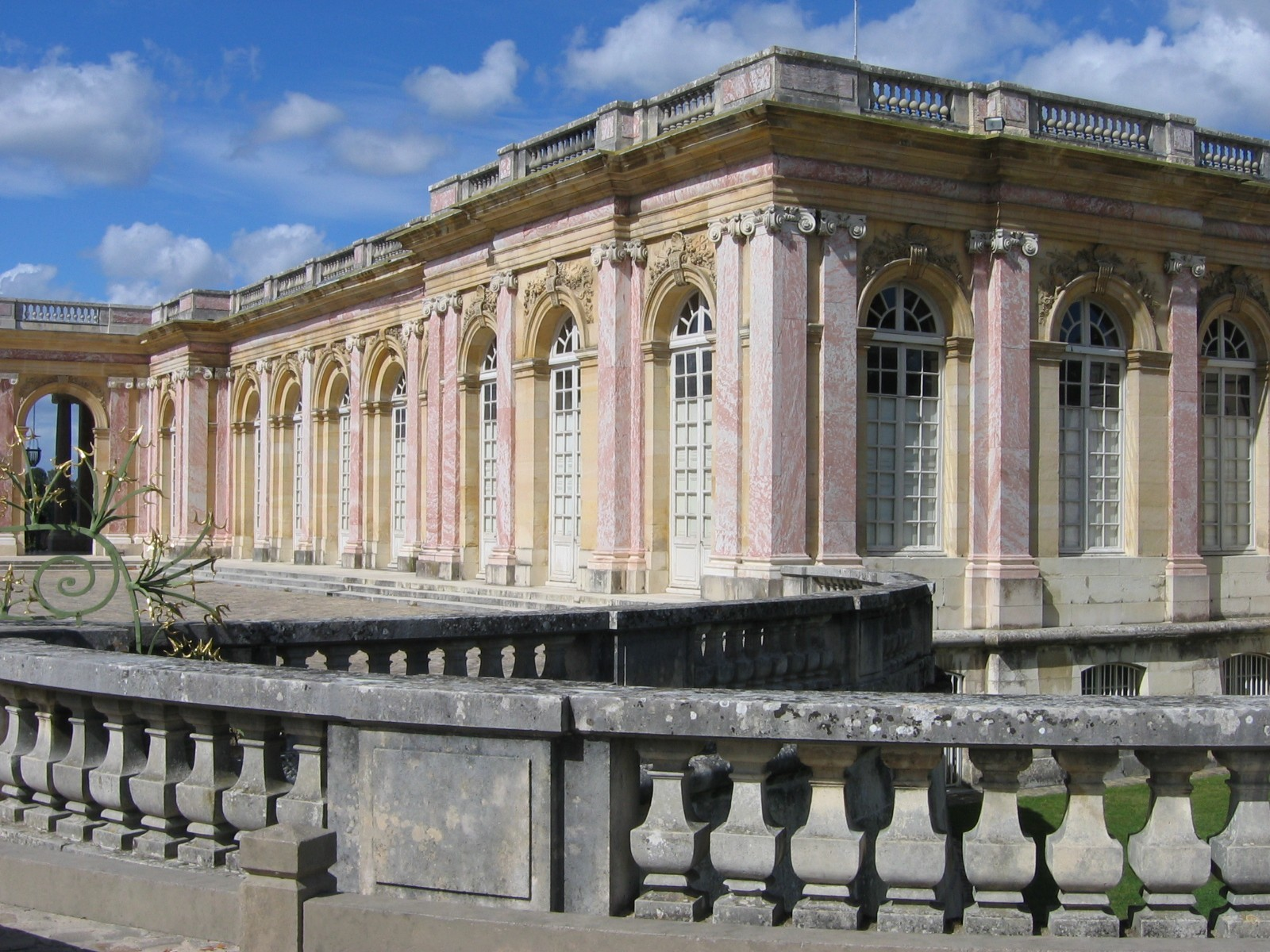
The Grand Trianon, as seen from the entry court (1678), Jules Hardouin-Mansart, architect

The Grand Trianon is a château located within the park of the Palace of Versailles, built between 1687 and 1689 as a private retreat for Louis XIV and his mistress. Designed by the architect Jules Hardouin-Mansar, the structure is notable for its use of pink Languedoc marble in an Italianate-style.

The building comprises two principal wings separated by an entry courtyard. The southern wing originally contained service rooms and the private apartments of Louis XIV, while the northern wing featured two enfilades: one facing the upper garden to the west and the other opening onto the enclosed jardin du roi (King's Garden) to the east. A small theater was initially located at the northern end of the courtyard area. The two wings are connected by an open colonnade, which also provides a visual and spatial transition between the courtyard and the surrounding gardens.

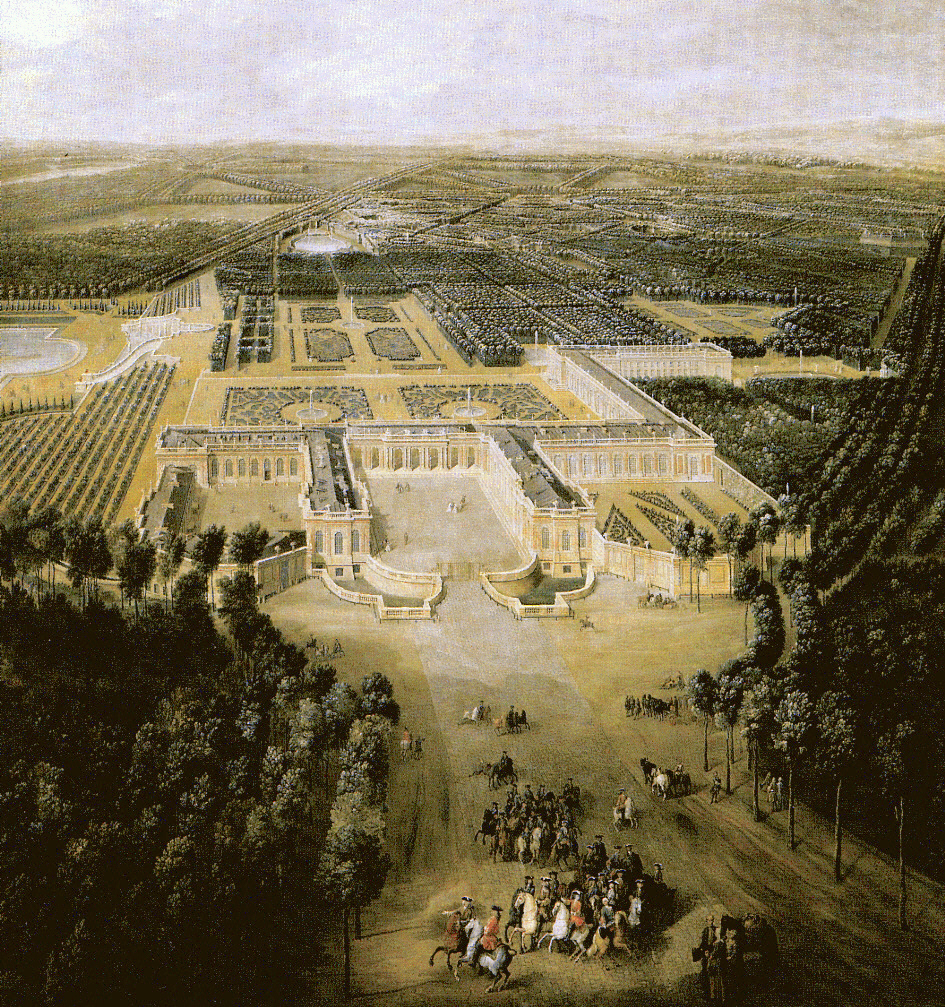
The Grand Trianon by Jean-Baptiste Martin (ca.1700)

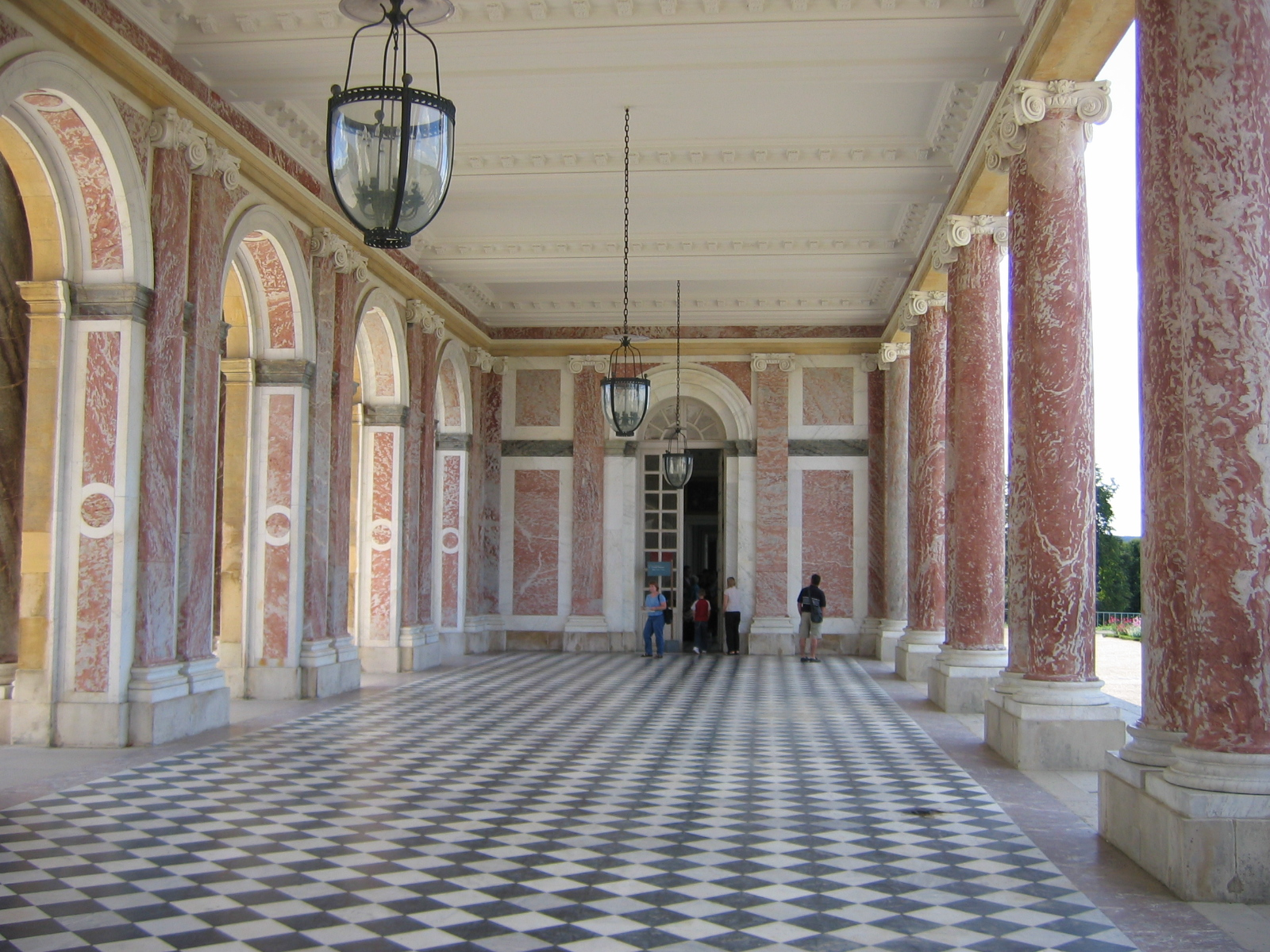
Colonnade of the Grand Trianon (1678), Jules Hardouin-Mansart, architect

Perpendicular to the north wing is the Galerie, the largest room in the Grand Trianon, measuring nearly 30 meters in length. It is illuminated by five windows on the north side and eleven on the south, and serves as a protective barrier for the upper garden to the south.

To the west of the Galerie lies the Trianon-sous-bois wing, which provided apartments for members of the royal family. North of the Galerie and east of Trianon-sous-bois was originally a marshy area, which Hardouin-Mansart transformed into the jardin des sources, a wooded landscape with streams and islets inspired by the bosquet des Sources at Versailles.

Throughout Louis XIV's reign, the Grand Trianon underwent several modifications, including the relocation of the king’s apartments from the south to the north wing. In contrast to the didactic and symbolic decor of the main palace at Versailles (which emphasized Louis XIV’s persona through allegories of Augustus, Alexander, and Apollo) the Grand Trianon adopted a more relaxed and understated decorative style, reflecting its function as a space removed from the strict court protocol of Versailles.

Under Louis XV, the Grand Trianon saw minor changes: the theatre was removed and rooms facing the jardin du roi were redecorated for Madame de Pompadour. Louis XVI made little use of the building, and during the French Revolution, the château’s furnishings were sold off, as was the case at Versailles.

Napoleon Bonaparte took a strong interest in the Grand Trianon, ordering it to be remodelled and redecorated for use by himself and his family. Later, during the reign of Louis-Philippe, it became a favored royal residence, and much of the decor from both the Napoleonic and July Monarchy periods is still present.

In the 20th century, during the presidency of Charles de Gaulle, the Grand Trianon underwent comprehensive restoration and modernization to accommodate official functions, including state banquets. The Trianon-sous-bois wing was renovated to include modern residential quarters, and the basement was fitted with contemporary professional kitchens.

The Grand Trianon remains an official residence of the President of the French Republic and is occasionally used to host visiting heads of state. Public access to the Trianon-sous-bois section began during the presidency of Jacques Chirac.

== Petit Trianon ==
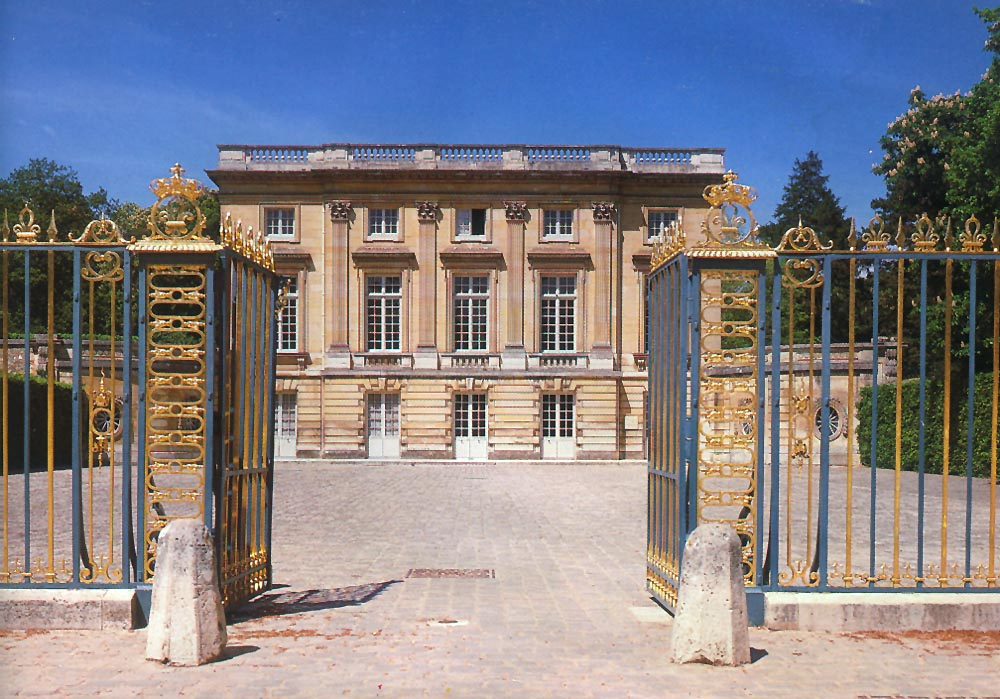
Entry courtyard of the Petit Trianon designed by Jacques-Anges Gabriel

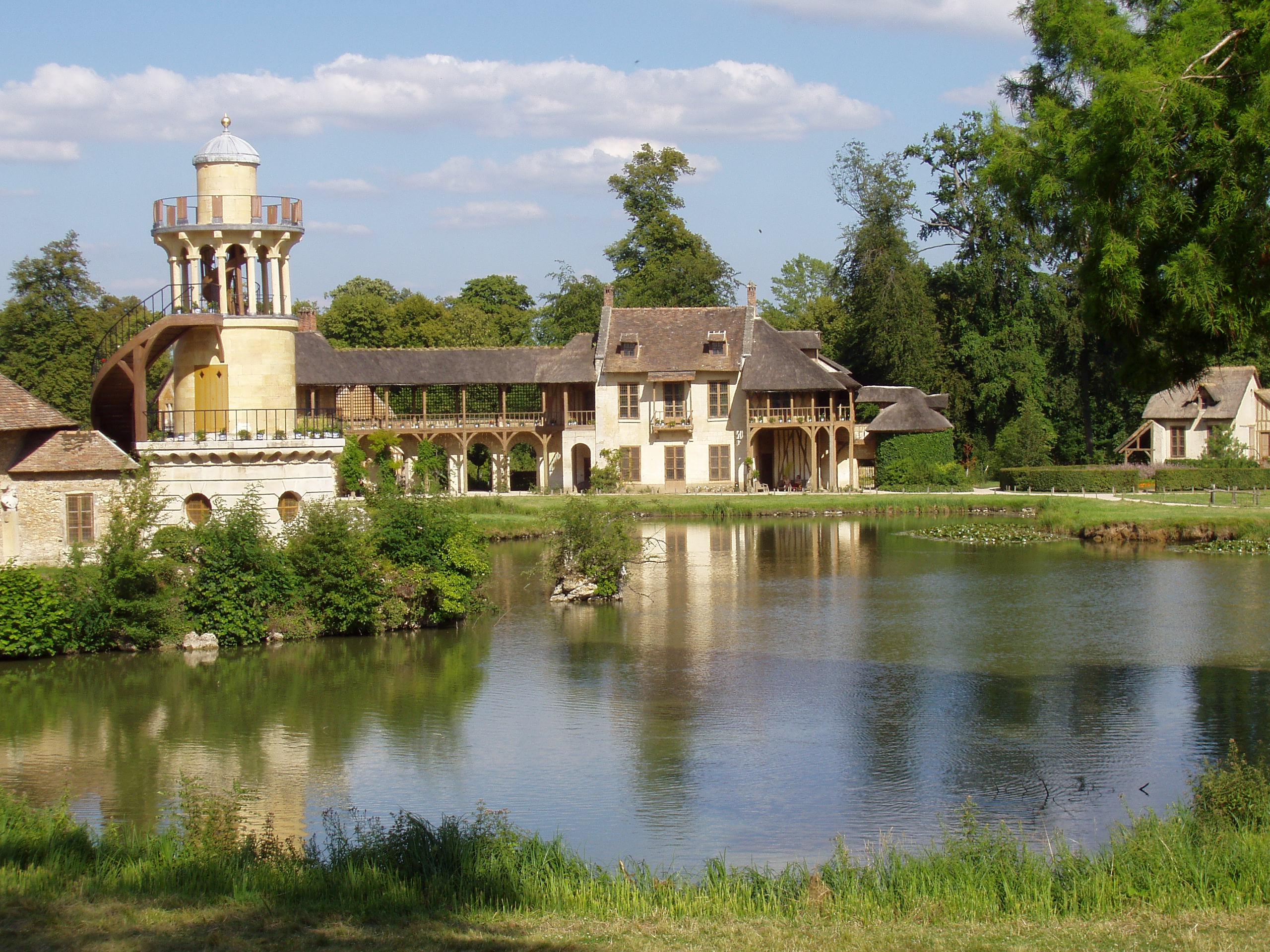
The Queen's House (center) and the Tour de Malborough (left) Hameau de la Reine in the park, built in 1783.

The Petit Trianon is a château located within the grounds of the Palace of Versailles, near the Grand Trianon. Constructed between 1762 and 1768 during the reign of Louis XV, it was designed by architect Ange-Jacques Gabriel. The area surrounding the Petit Trianon gained prominence when Louis XV established jardins botaniques (botanical gardens) in what would later become the site of the Hameau de la Reine.

Originally intended to support the king’s interests in botany and natural sciences, the Petit Trianon also served as a retreat from court life. However, it is most closely associated with Marie Antoinette, under whose direction the estate underwent significant transformation.

Shortly after ascending to the throne in 1774, Louis XVI gifted the Petit Trianon to Marie Antoinette. The queen commissioned extensive modifications to both the château and its gardens, primarily under the direction of architect Richard Mique. Renovations included the removal of a mechanical dumbwaiter system, originally installed by Louis XV to allow for servant-free dining, reflecting a shift in the building’s intended use. At the same time, the botanical gardens were relocated to Paris, and in their place, Marie Antoinette initiated the creation of the Hameau de la Reine.

The Hameau was a model pastoral village designed in the rustic style then fashionable among the European aristocracy. While derided by critics as emblematic of royal extravagance, it was intended as both a retreat and a working farm where agricultural innovations in animal husbandry and agronomy could be demonstrated. The estate also featured a private theatre where the queen and her circle staged performances for select audiences.

Due to its close association with Marie Antoinette and the perception of excess it represented, the Petit Trianon and the Hameau de la Reine were vandalized and pillaged during the French Revolution. Under the First French Empire, Napoleon Bonaparte symbolically gifted the Petit Trianon to his mother, Letizia Bonaparte, although she never resided there. During the July Monarchy, King Louis-Philippe presented the estate to his wife, Queen Marie-Amélie, who undertook refurbishments of the house and gardens.

In the modern era, the Petit Trianon and the Hameau de la Reine have been the focus of extensive restoration efforts aimed at returning the estate to its appearance at the time of Marie Antoinette’s final departure in October 1789.

== Pavillon de la Lanterne ==
La Lanterne is a former royal hunting lodge located in Versailles, near the Ménagerie and adjacent to the Park of Versailles, and served as a vacation retreat for prime ministers during the Fifth Republic. Originally built in the 18th century by Philippe Louis Marc Antoine de Noailles, then-governor of Versailles, the pavilion was a gift from Louis XV to Noailles’s father, Philippe de Noailles. The original structure included a ground floor and an attic level, with façades ornamented by seven decorative spans—six windows and a central doorway crowned by a pediment. The identity of the architect remains unknown due to the absence of surviving archival documentation. Between 1785 and 1786, the decorative grille enclosing the courtyard was enhanced with 36 herms, including two surmounted by deer heads. These elements were restored in the early 1940s, and a full restoration of the building was undertaken in 1994.

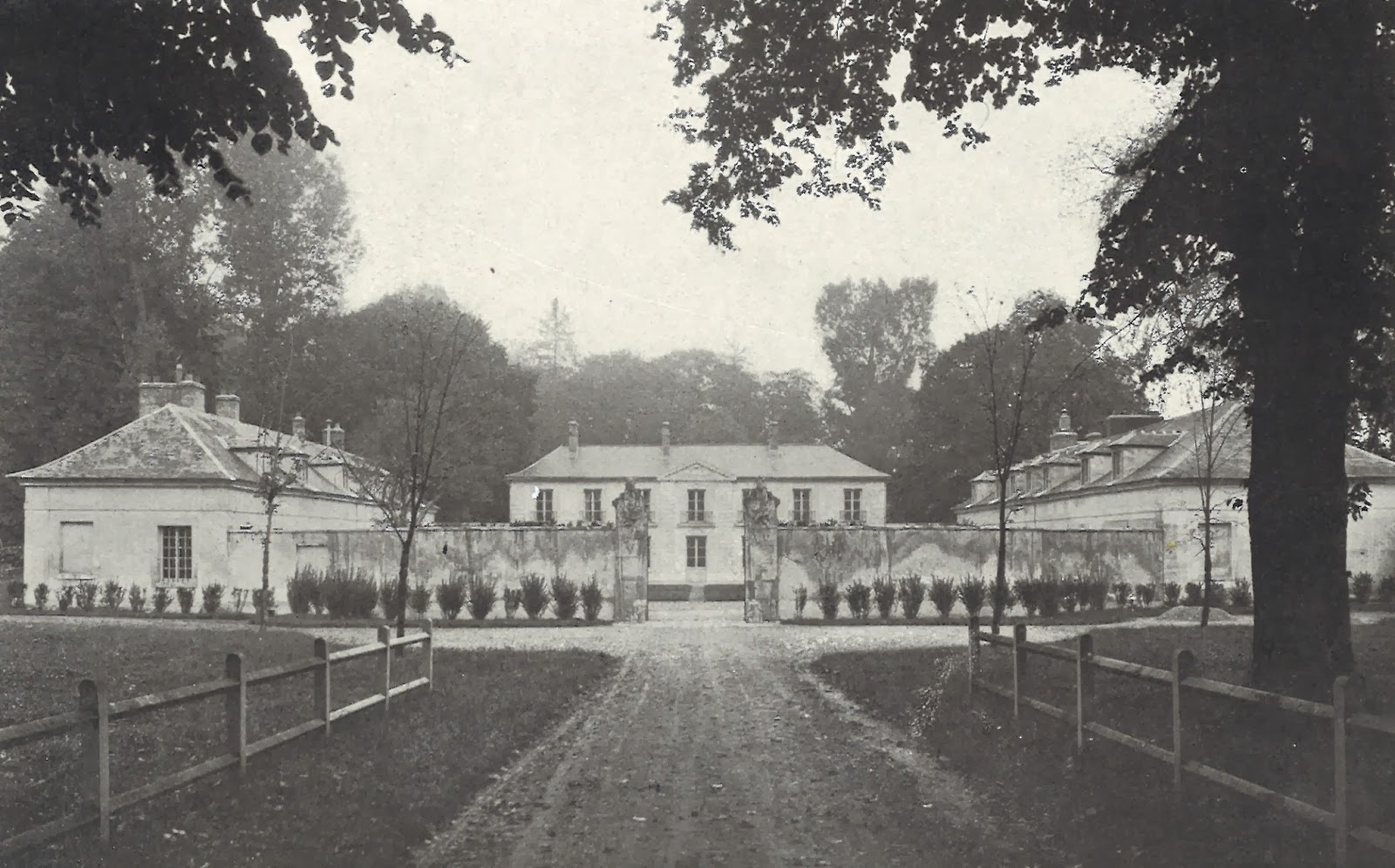
Panorama of La Lanterne, a hunting lodge (photo taken in 1926)

The estate is situated on the road linking Versailles with Saint-Cyr-l'École and features a central U-shaped, two-story building. The main block measures approximately 20 meters in length by 6 meters in width, and is flanked by two lower wings added at a later date, forming a gravel courtyard. A tree-lined lane connects the courtyard to the road. In addition to the main structure, the estate includes a swimming pool, a tennis court, and five guest rooms. During the French Revolution, the property was abandoned, as were many other royal residences, but it was repurchased in 1818 by Louis XVIII.

In the modern era, the property gained new prominence under the Fifth Republic. In 1959, President Charles de Gaulle designated La Lanterne as a private retreat for the serving prime minister of France. Despite this designation, one of its most notable residents during this period was Minister of Culture André Malraux, who lived there from 1962 to 1969 after an assassination attempt by the Organisation armée secrète destroyed his apartment in Boulogne-Billancourt. Much of the interior decoration at La Lanterne dates from this period and was chosen by Malraux’s companion, the writer Louise de Vilmorin. In the late 1980s, Prime Minister Michel Rocard ordered further renovations and oversaw the installation of the swimming pool and tennis court.

In 2007, shortly after his election, President Nicolas Sarkozy spent his first weekend at La Lanterne (12–13 May), while still president-elect. Although formally invited by Prime Minister Dominique de Villepin, Sarkozy’s stay effectively marked the transition of La Lanterne from a prime ministerial retreat to an official presidential residence. Its secluded location and relative anonymity offer a degree of privacy and security difficult to maintain at more publicly accessible sites such as the Grand Trianon, which had served as the traditional presidential retreat until that time. La Lanterne continues to function as a private residence for the French President and is not open to the public.

== Bibliography and sources ==
With regard to source materials for these structures, the following list of imprints and articles has been used for this article:

- Artz, Richard (13 May 2007). "Villepin veut s'éloigner". Rtl2007.
- Bacquém Raphaëlle (14 January 2008). "Les fêtes de Malraux, le tennis de Jospin". Le Monde.
- Bandiera, John D. (1985). Le recueil des plans du Petit Trianon de Richard Mique. Colloque de Versailles.
- Carrott, Richard G. (January 1988). "The Hameau de Trianon: Mique, Rousseau and Marie-Antoinette". Gazette des Beaux-Arts. 131 (pér. 6): 19–28.
- Constrom, Daniel (1927). "Quelques détails sur le grand Trianon en 1693". Revue de l'Histoire de Versailles: 23–24.
- Danis, Robert (1927). La première maison royale de Trianon, 1670–1687. Paris: Editions Albert Morancé.
- Dulac, Clémence (14 October 2007). "Résidence d'Etat : éclairage sur La Lanterne". Le Figaro.
- Jestaz, Bertrand (November 1969). "Le Trianon de Marbre ou Louis XIV Architecte". Gazette des Beaux-Arts. 74 (pér. 6): 259–286.
- Josephson, Ragnar (1927). "Le grand Trianon sous Louis XIV, d'après des documents inédits". Revue de l'Histoire de Versailles: 5–20.
- Kimball, Fiske (December 1936). "Le décor du château de la Ménagerie à Versailles". Gazette des Beaux-Arts. 16 (pér. 6): 245–256.
- Kimball, Fiske (1938). "La transformation des appartements de Trianon sous Louis XIV". Gazette des Beaux-Arts. 19 (pér. 6): 87–110.
- Kimball, Fiske (1943). The Creation of the Rococo. Philadelphia.
- Ledoux-Lebard, Denise (1975). Le Grand Trianon: meubles et objets d'art. Paris: Editions des musées nationaux.
- LeNostre, André (1927). "Description du Grand Trianon en 1694". Revue de l'Histoire de Versailles: 20–24.
- Lighthart, Edward (1997). Archétype et symbole dans le style Louis XIV versaillais: réflexions sur l'imago rex et l'imago patriae au début de l'époque moderne. Doctoral thesis.
- Mabile, Gérard (January 1974). "La Ménagerie de Versailles". Gazette des Beaux-Arts. 83 (pér. 6): 5–34.
- Magnien, Maurice (1908). "Le Trianon de Marbre pendant le règne de Louis XIV". Revue de l'Histoire de Versailles: 1–30.
- Marquet de Vasselot, Jean J. (1899). "La Ménagerie du château de Versailles: la grotte et les pavillons". Revue de l'Histoire de Versailles: 81–96.
- Marie, Alfred (1968). Naissance de Versailles. Paris.
- Marie, Alfred and Jeanne (1972). Mansart à Versailles. Paris.
- Marie, Alfred and Jeanne (1976). Versailles au temps de Louis XIV. Paris.
- Marie, Alfred and Jeanne (1984). Versailles au temps de Louis XV. Paris.
- Meyer, Daniel (1976). "Les antichambres et les salons au Petit Trianon". Revue du Louvre. 3: 208–212.
- Montier, A. (1902). "La poterie normande au Trianon de Porcelaine". Revue de l'Histoire de Versailles: 183–195.
- Nolhac, Pierre de (1901). "Trianon de Porcelaine". Revue de l'Histoire de Versailles: 1–16.
- Nolhac, Pierre de (1901). La création de Versailles. Versailles.
- Nolhac, Pierre de (1925). Versailles, Résidence de Louis XIV. Paris.
- Nolhac, Pierre de (1927). Trianon. Paris: Louis Conard.
- Schnapper, Antoine (1967). Tableaux pour le Trianon de Marbre: 1688-1714. Paris.
- Verlet, Pierre (1985). Versailles. Paris.
