= Trianon de Porcelaine =

Demolished building near the Palace of Versailles

Coordinates: 48.8140°N 2.1047°E

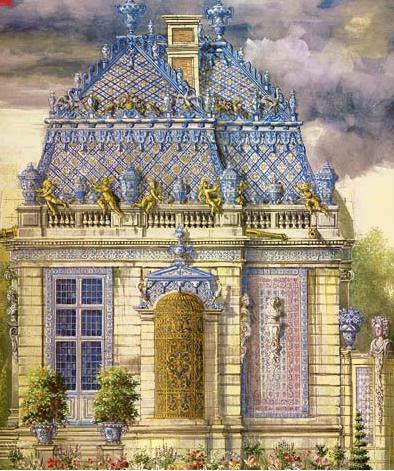
Artist's impression of the Trianon de Porcelaine, c.1680

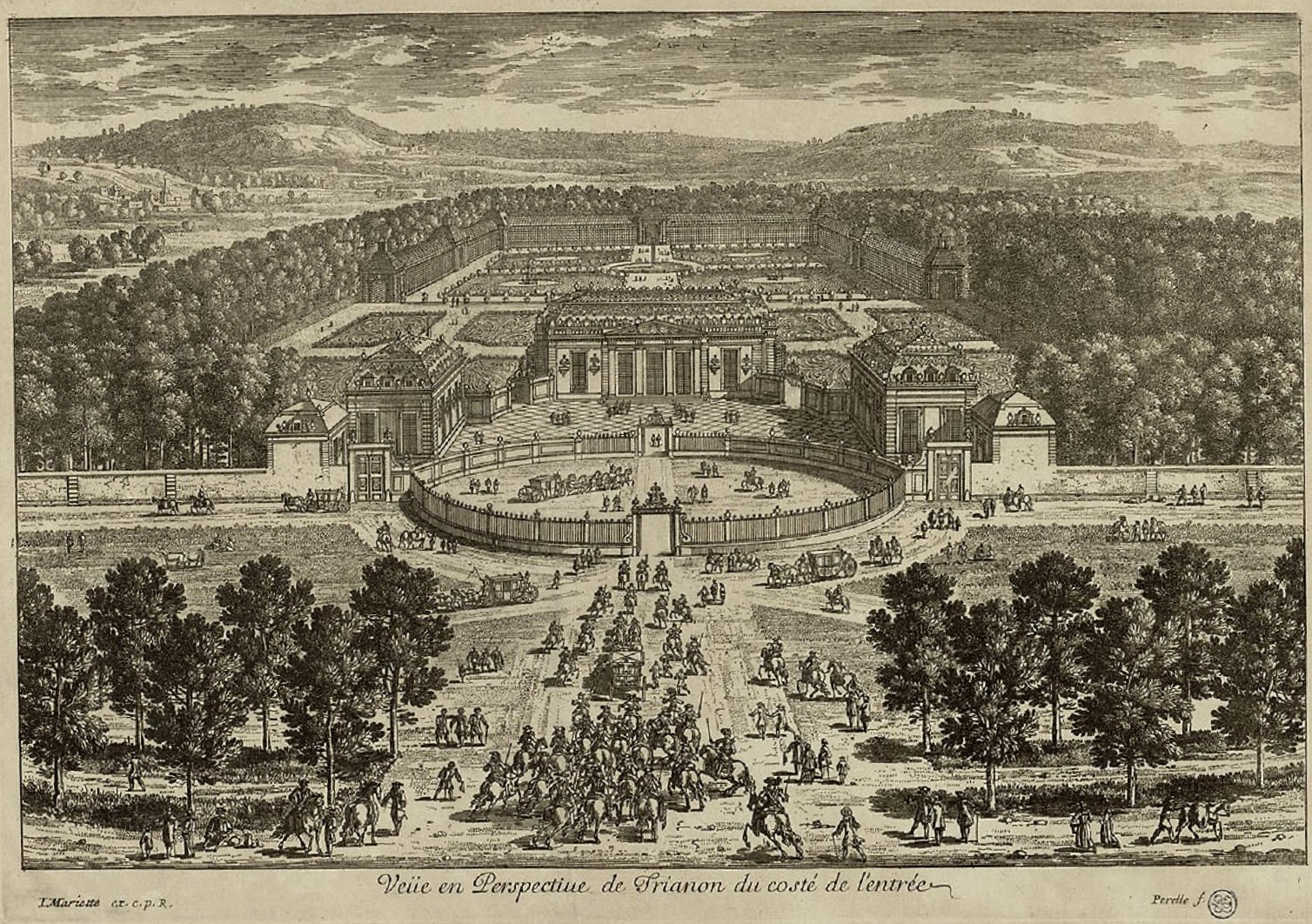
Perspective view of the east side of the Trianon de Porcelaine and its courtyards, c.1680

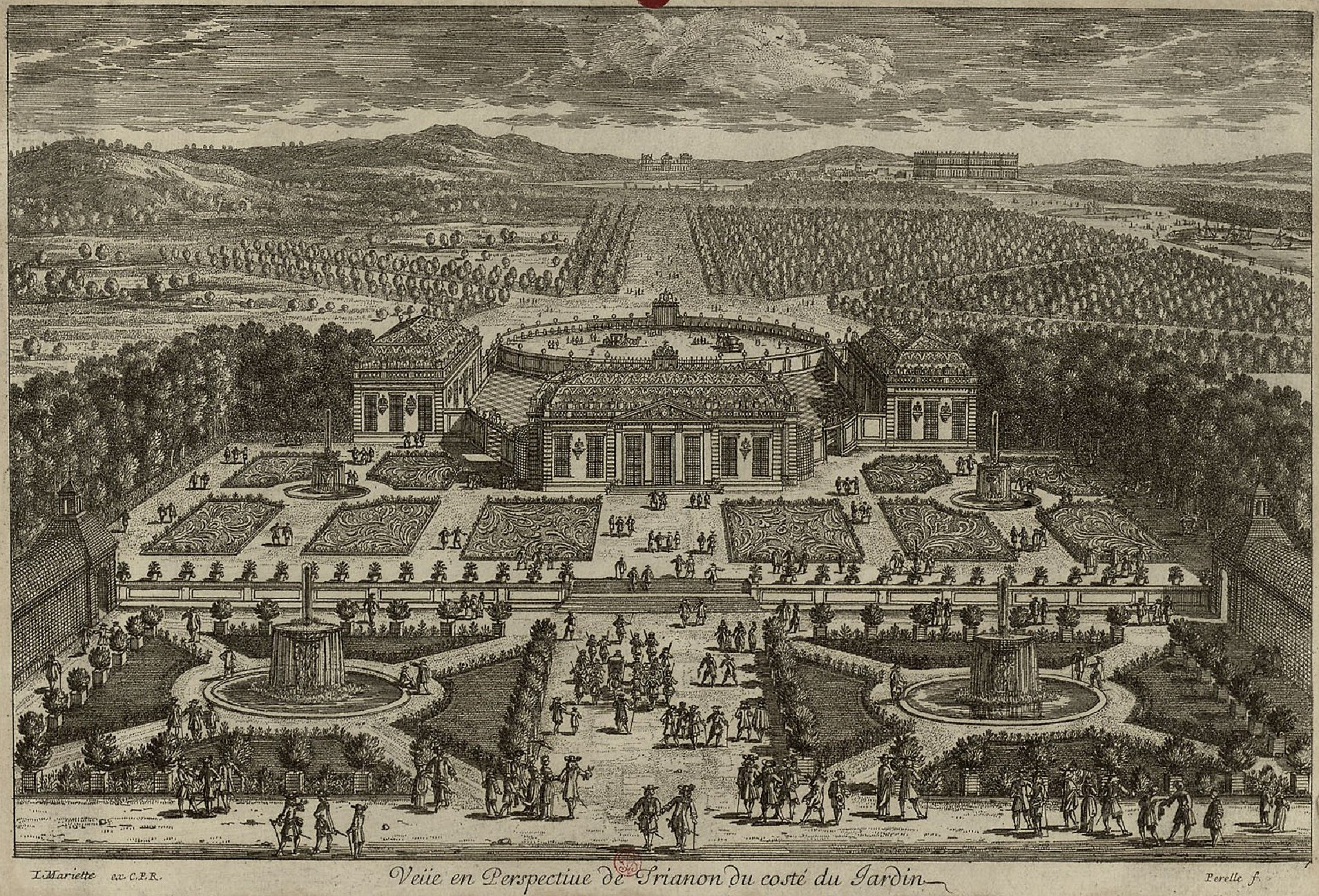
Perspective view of the west side of the Trianon de Porcelaine and its parterre, with the Palace of Versailles in the distance, c.1680

The Trianon de Porcelaine (French pronunciation: [tʁijanɔ̃ də pɔʁsəlɛn]; French for Porcelain Trianon) was a short-lived structure constructed near the Palace of Versailles in the Kingdom of France, and is considered to be the first Chinoiserie building in Europe. It was built in 1670 on the former site of the village of Trianon which Louis XIV had acquired in the 1660s to enlarge the grounds of his expanding palace. The structure comprised five wood-framed pavilions, decorated with blue and white ceramic tiles, and surrounded by formal gardens with extravagant displays of perfumed flowers.

The Trianon de Porcelaine was demolished in 1687 and replaced by the more permanent Grand Trianon, which was constructed from stone and so is sometimes known as the Trianon de Marbre (Marble Trianon).

== Background ==
The small village of Trianon was situated to the northwest of Versailles. As Louis XIV developed the former hunting lodge at Versailles into a royal palace, he also expanded its gardens and grounds, acquiring the land around Trianon between 1662 and 1665. He had the rural buildings of the village removed, and a new building was designed for the king by his architect, Louis Le Vau, with the construction was completed by Le Vau's assistant François d'Orbay.

== Description ==
The new structure comprised five wood-framed pavilions decorated with blue and white ceramic tiles, in what was considered to be a Chinese style, emulating accounts that had been received of the Porcelain Tower of Nanjing. In the absence of a European source of true porcelain, the tiles were made of faience (tin-glazed earthenware) produced by potteries in the Netherlands (Delftware) and France, mostly decorated with blue glazes but also including some with green or yellow. The decorative scheme included pottery vases arranged along the ridge of the main building. The interior decoration - ceramic tiles, woodwork, stucco, other surfaces, and furniture - were all painted white and blue, "à la chinoise", with ceilings painted by François Francart, a painter at the Gobelins Manufactory, and his brother Gilbert Francart.

The structure was used as a banqueting house, and as a meeting place for Louis XIV and his mistress Madame de Montespan from 1671. The king was entertained in the main central pavilion, which had one main storey with high attics above, and three main rooms: a central living room of 22 ft × 19 ft (6.7 m × 5.8 m) and two apartments: the Appartement de Diane ("Apartment of Diana") and the Appartement des Amours ("Apartment of Love"), each with a gilded bed. Other guest and service functions were relegated to the other four pavilions, two large and two small, arranged around two oval courtyards.

The Trianon de Porcelaine was surrounded by formal gardens divided into three parts. A parterre behind the central pavilion contained fountains and flowerbeds, using an innovative system of flowers buried in pots which could be replaced very quickly, allowing fresh flowers grown in hothouses to be put out at any time including the middle of winter, and enabling the decorative scheme of perfumed and exotic flowers to be changed during the course of a single day. A south facing slope was planted with fragrant orange trees, which were protected by temporary greenhouses in the winter, overlooking the north end of the Grand Canal, which had been constructed between 1668 and 1671. There was also walled lower garden with a perfumery.

One of the main purposes of the new structure was to allow the king and his guests to enjoy the sight and perfume of the flower displays in the garden, and for that reason it was sometimes known as the "pavillon de Flore". The collection of flowers at the north end of the Grand Canal's transverse arm balanced the collection of animals in the royal menagerie at the south end, completed in 1664.

== Legacy ==
By 1687, the king's affair with Madame de Montespan had ended. Louis XIV's new mistress, Madame de Maintenon, disliked the building, and the exterior decorative tiles were becoming cracked and badly weathered, so he ordered the demolition of the Trianon de Porcelaine and replacement by a more permanent structure, designed by Jules Hardouin-Mansart. The Grand Trianon was constructed from stone masonry, and so is sometimes known as the Trianon de marbre ("Trianon of marble").

Few traces of the Trianon de Porcelaine survive, save for the layout of its garden, some vases, some painted wall panels, and some furniture attributed to the cabinetmaker Pierre Gole, including a writing table held by the Getty Museum.

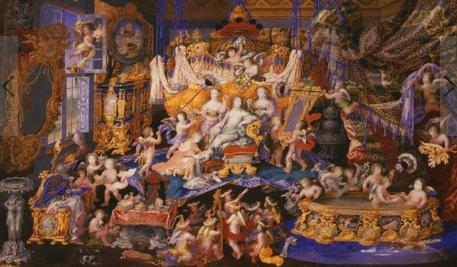
Madame de Montespan at the Trianon de Porcelaine in 1674

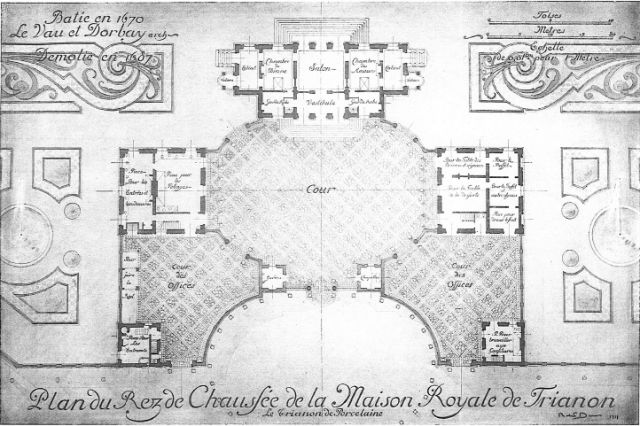
Plan of the Trianon de Porcelaine

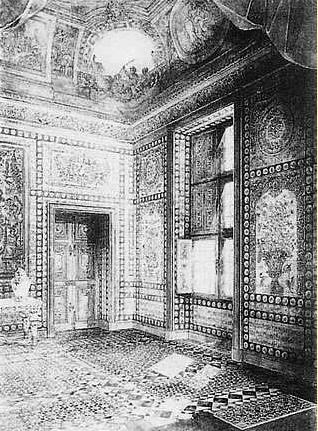
Artist's impression of the Chambre de Diane

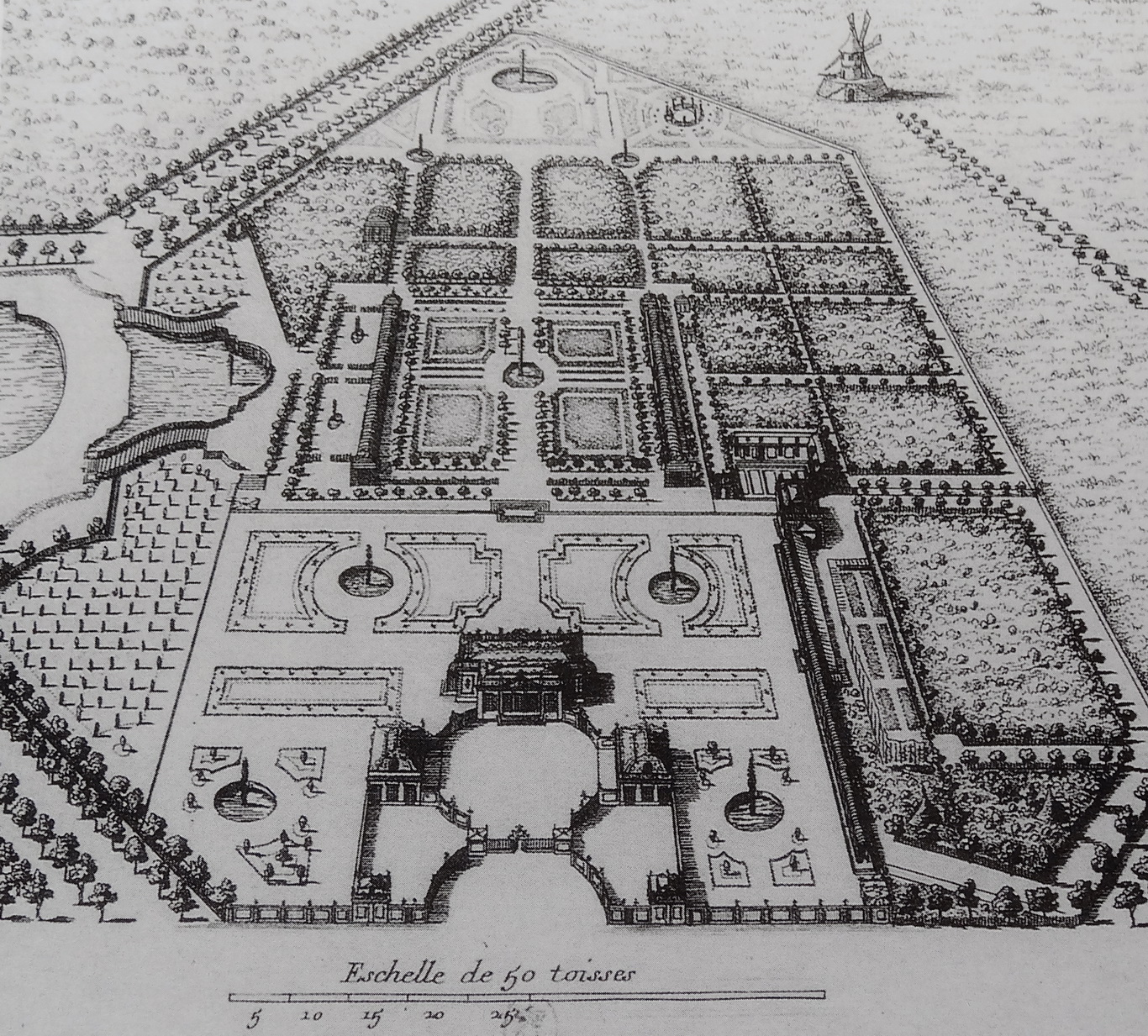
Aerial view of the Trianon de Porcelaine, from the east, 17th century

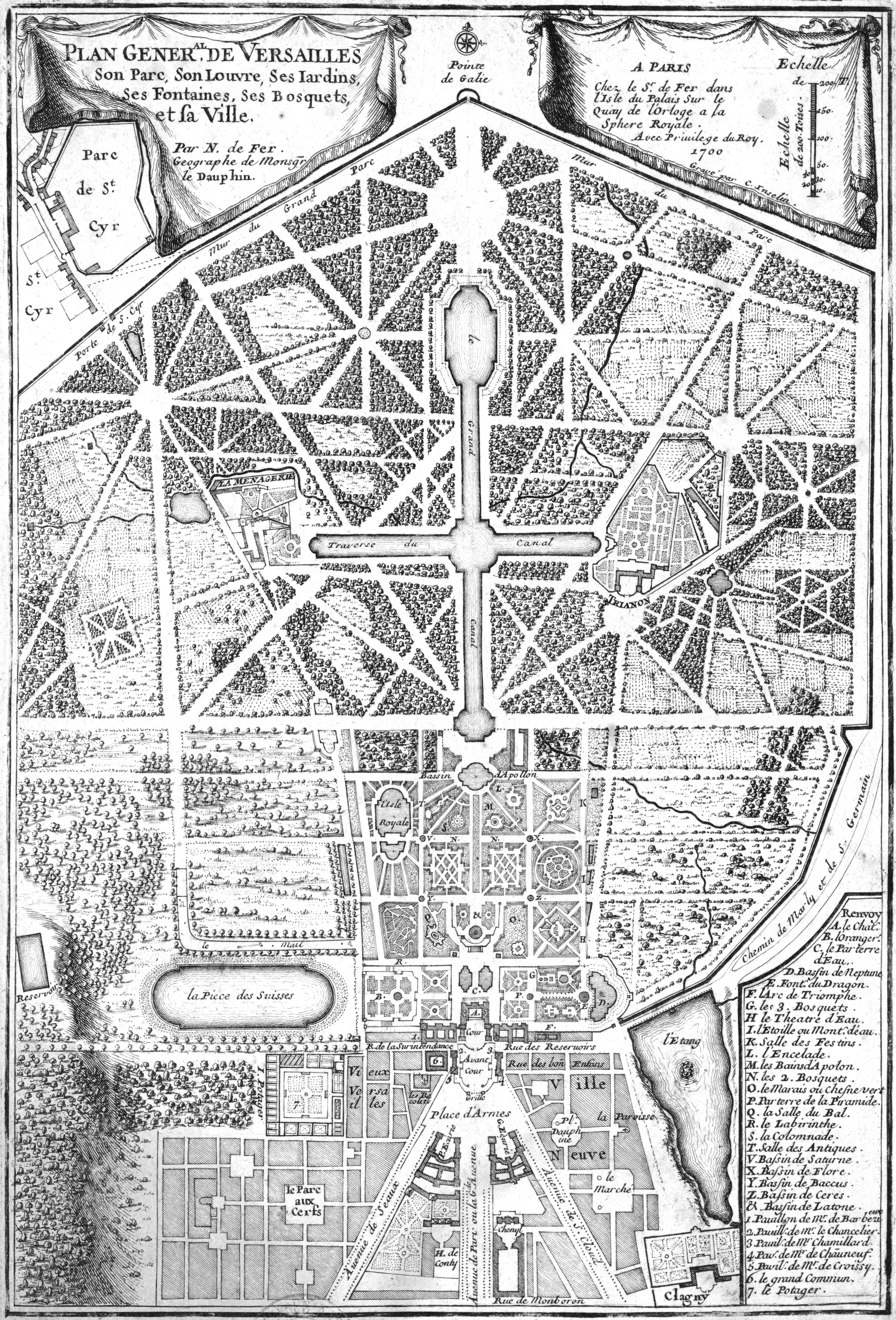
Plan of the Palace of Versailles and its gardens, c.1700

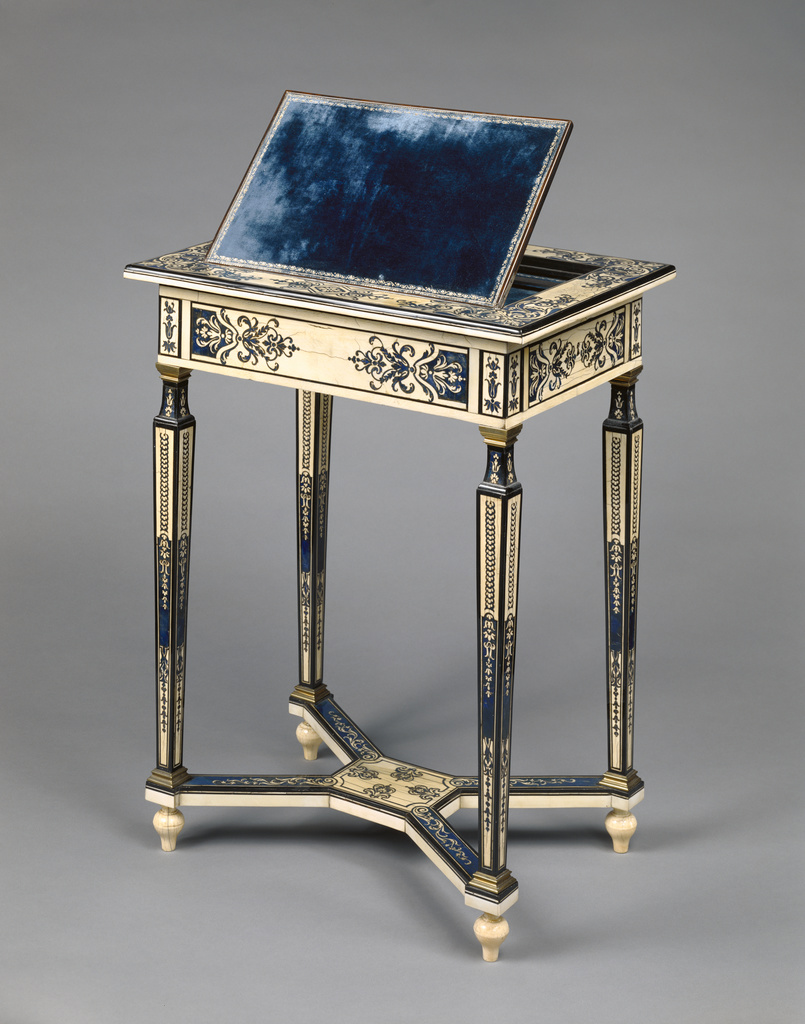
Writing table from the Trianon de Porcelaine, Getty Museum

== See also ==
- Subsidiary structures of the Palace of Versailles
