= Bourbon-l'Archambault =

- Commune
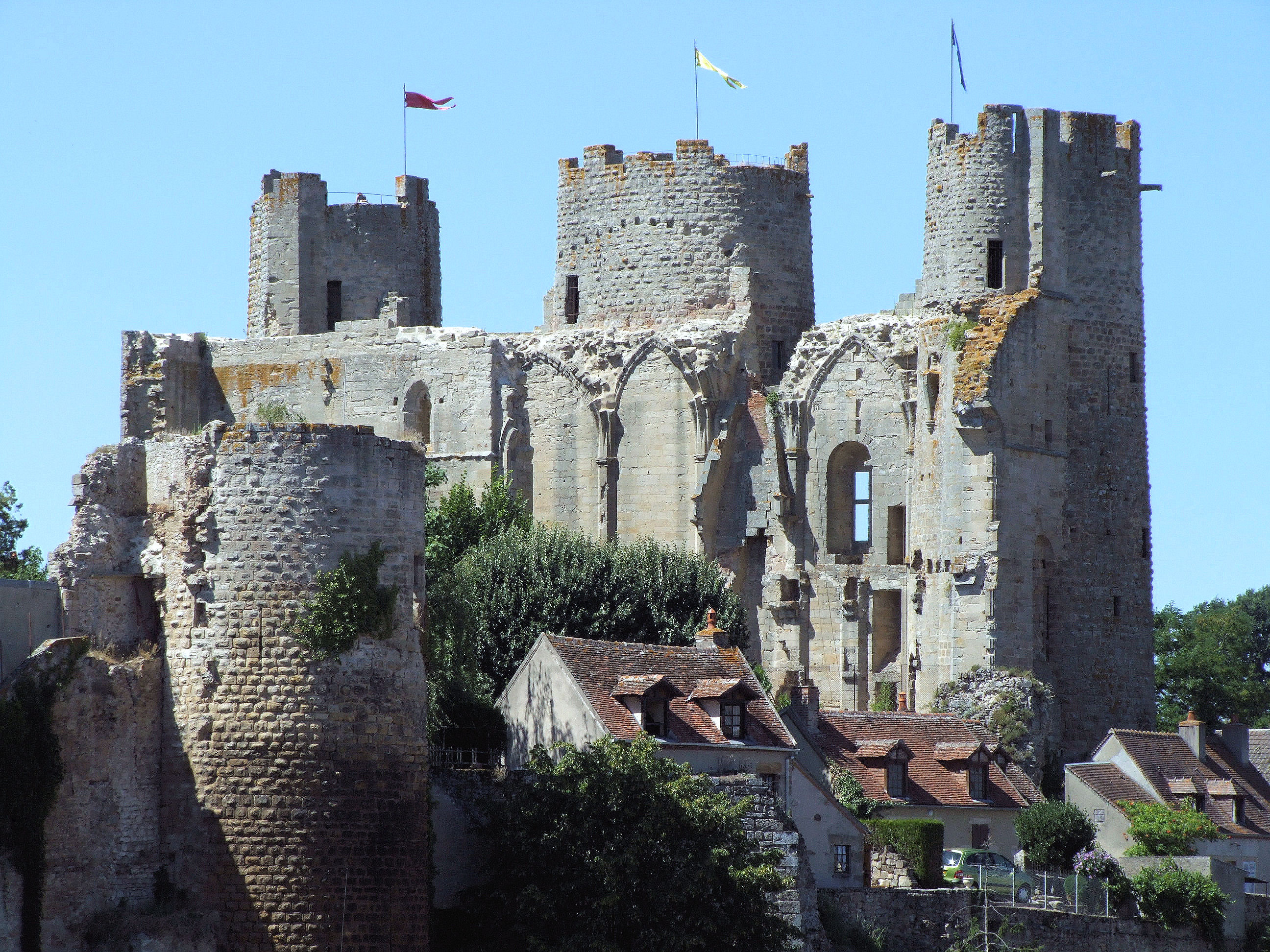
- The chateau in Bourbon-l'Archambault

- Coat of arms
- Location of Bourbon-l'Archambault
- Location within France Location within Auvergne-Rhône-Alpes
- Coordinates: 46°35′03″N 3°03′26″E
- Country: France
- Region: Auvergne-Rhône-Alpes
- Department: Allier
- Arrondissement: Moulins
- Canton: Bourbon-l'Archambault
- Intercommunality: Bocage Bourbonnais (seat)

Government
  - Mayor (2026–32): Ludovic Chaput
- Area^{1}: 54.84 km^{2} (21.17 sq mi)
- Elevation: 260 m (850 ft)
- Highest elevation: 321 m (1,053 ft)
- Lowest elevation: 215 m (705 ft)
- Population (2023): 2,494
  - Density: 45.48/km^{2} (117.8/sq mi)
- Time zone: UTC+01:00 (CET)
  - Summer (DST): UTC+02:00 (CEST)
- INSEE/Postal code: 03036 /03160
- ^{1} French Land Register data, which excludes lakes, ponds, glaciers > 1 km^{2} (0.386 sq mi or 247 acres) and river estuaries.

Bourbon-l'Archambault (French pronunciation: [buʁbɔ̃ laʁʃɑ̃bo]) is a spa town and a commune in the Allier department in Auvergne-Rhône-Alpes region in central France. It is the place of origin of the House of Bourbon.

== Population ==
Historical population
Year	Pop.	±% p.a.
1968	2,607	—
1975	2,598	−0.05%
1982	2,550	−0.27%
1990	2,630	+0.39%
1999	2,564	−0.28%
2007	2,604	+0.19%
2012	2,561	−0.33%
2017	2,559	−0.02%
2023	2,494	−0.43%
Source: INSEE

== Personalities ==
In 1681, Louise Marie Anne de Bourbon, Mademoiselle de Tours - the third daughter of Louis XIV and his mistress Françoise-Athénaïs de Rochechouart de Mortemart, marquise de Montespan - died there at the age of six. On 27 May 1707, Madame de Montespan herself also died at the chateau.

The town was Charles Maurice de Talleyrand-Périgord's favorite vacation spot.

In 1915, mathematician André Lichnerowicz was born here (died 1998).

== See also ==
- Communes of the Allier department
- Bourbonnais
- Borvo
- House of Bourbon

== Sources ==
- Gouhot, Pierre (1988). Bourbon-l'Archambault: Station thermale du rhumatisme (in French). Expansion scientifique française.
- Schofield, Hugh (26 December 2014). "The link between bourbon biscuits and bourbon whiskey". BBC News.
