= Madame de Montespan =

Most celebrated maîtresse-en-titre of Louis XIV

Françoise-Athenaïs
- Marquise de Montespan
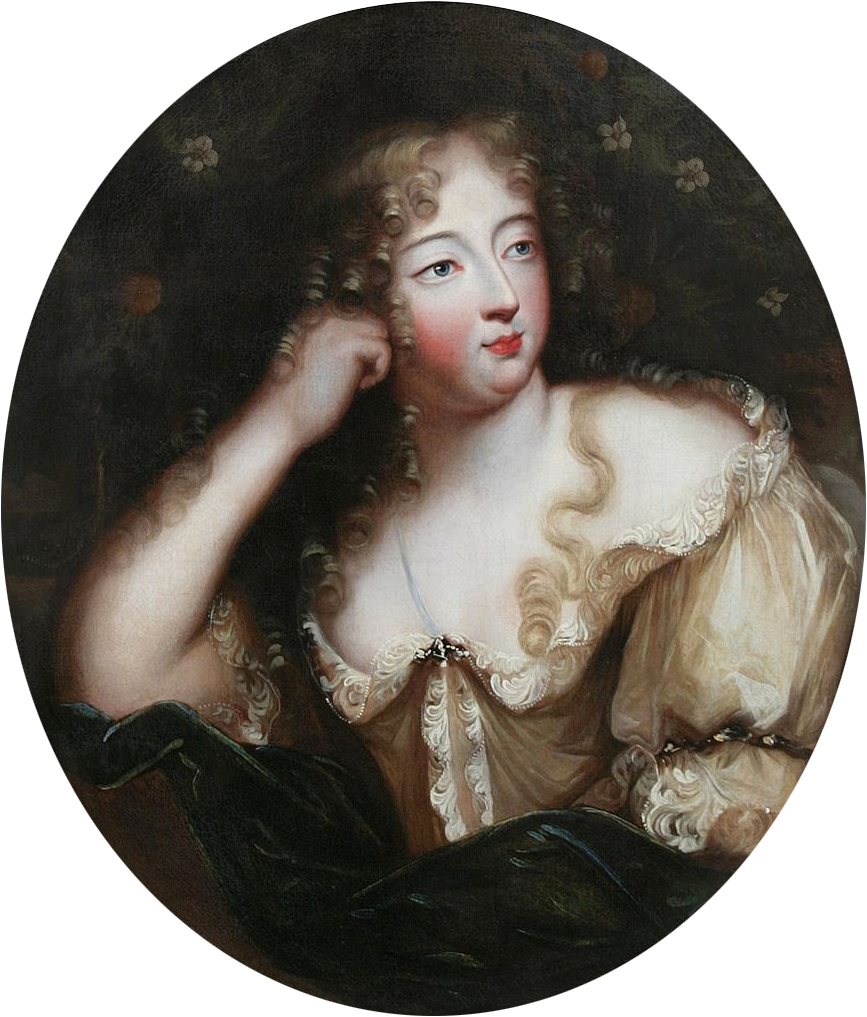
- Portrait c. 1670
- Full name: Françoise Athénaïs de Rochechouart de Mortemart
- Born: October 1640; Lussac-les-Châteaux, Poitou, France
- Baptised: 5 October 1640; Lussac-les-Châteaux, France
- Died: 27 May 1707 (aged 66); Bourbon-l'Archambault, France
- Noble family: Rochechouart (by birth); Pardaillan de Gondrin (by marriage)
- Spouse: Louis Henri de Pardaillan de Gondrin (m. 1663; died 1691)
- Issue Detail: Marie Christine de Pardaillan de Gondrin; Louis Antoine, Duke of Antin; Louis Auguste, Duke of Maine; Louis César, Count of Vexin; Louise Françoise, Duchess of Bourbon; Louise Marie Anne, Mademoiselle de Tours; Françoise Marie, Duchess of Orléans; Louis Alexandre, Count of Toulouse
- Father: Gabriel de Rochechouart de Mortemart
- Mother: Diane de Grandseigne
- Occupation: Maîtresse-en-titre

Françoise-Athénaïs de Rochechouart de Mortemart, Marquise of Montespan (5 October 1640 – 27 May 1707), commonly known as Madame de Montespan (French: [madam də mɔ̃tɛspɑ̃]), was a French noblewoman and the most celebrated royal mistress of King Louis XIV. During their romantic relationship, which lasted from the late 1660s to the late 1670s, she was sometimes referred to by contemporaries as the "true Queen of France" due to the pervasiveness of her influence at court.

Born into the House of Rochechouart, one of the oldest noble families of France, Françoise-Athénaïs married the Marquis of Montespan in 1663. She then became a maid of honour to Princess Henrietta, Duchess of Orléans, and later a lady-in-waiting to Queen Maria Theresa. Noted for her great beauty and wit, she carefully cultivated a relationship with Louis XIV and eventually supplanted Louise de La Vallière as his favourite. She had seven children by the king, six of them later legitimised but only four survived infancy. She mostly entrusted her children to Madame Scarron, who as the Marquise de Maintenon was later to replace her in the king's affections.

Madame de Montespan's alleged involvement in the Affair of the Poisons, which began in 1677, severely damaged her reputation and resulted in her fall from royal favour. In 1691, she withdrew to the convent of Filles de Saint-Joseph in Paris, but left thirteen years later when she relocated to the Château d'Oiron. She devoted the rest of her life to charity, patronage and penance until her death in 1707 at the age of 66. She is an ancestress of several royal houses in Europe, including those of Spain, Italy, Bulgaria, Portugal, Belgium and Luxembourg.

== Early life ==
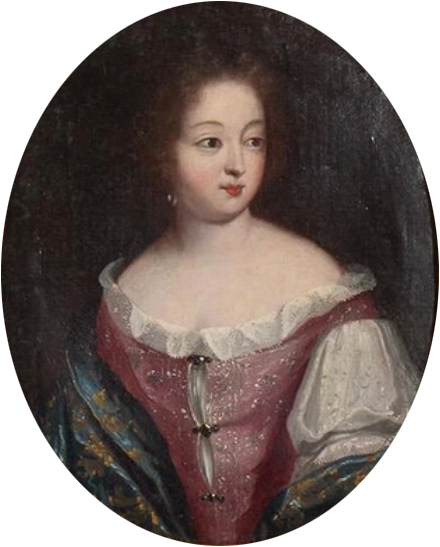
Françoise-Athénaïs as a child, by an unknown painter

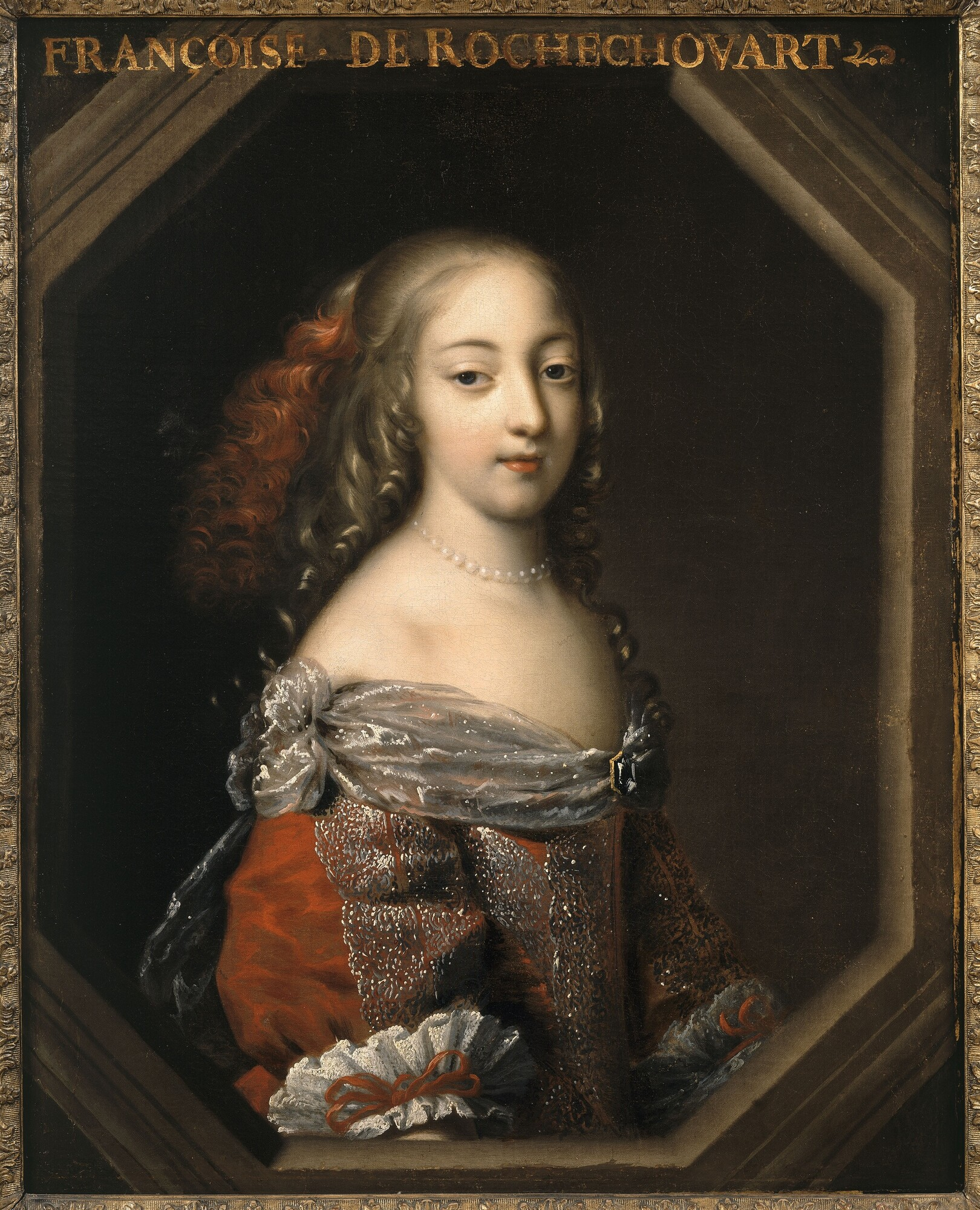
Portrait of Françoise-Athénaïs, c. 1660, when Mademoiselle de Tonnay-Charente

Françoise-Athénaïs was born in October 1640 and was baptised on 5 October 1640 at the Château of Lussac-les-Châteaux, today's Vienne department, in the Nouvelle-Aquitaine region in France. Françoise (as a précieuse, she later adopted the name "Athénaïs"), or more formally, Mademoiselle de Tonnay-Charente, possessed the blood of two of the oldest noble families of France through her parents, Gabriel de Rochechouart, the Duke of Mortemart and the Prince of Tonnay-Charente, and Diane de Grandseigne, a lady-in-waiting to Anne of Austria, queen consort of France.

From her father, she inherited the famous Mortemart esprit ("wit"). As a young girl, she often travelled with her mother between the family estates and the court at the Louvre in Paris. At the age of 12, she began her formal education at the Convent of St Mary at Saintes, where her sister Gabrielle had started hers almost a decade earlier. She was very religious and took Communion once a week, a practice that she would continue as a young woman.

At the age of 20, Françoise-Athénaïs became a maid-of-honour to the king's sister-in-law, Princess Henrietta, Duchess of Orléans, who was known at court by the traditional honorific of Madame. Later, because of the relationship between her mother and the queen dowager, Anne of Austria, Françoise-Athénaïs was appointed to be a lady-in-waiting to the king's wife, Maria Theresa of Spain.

=== Marriage ===
On 28 January 1663, Françoise-Athénaïs married Louis Henri de Pardaillan de Gondrin, Marquis of Montespan, who was one year her junior. Madame de La Fayette says in her Histoire de madame Henriette d'Angleterre that Françoise-Athénaïs was in love with another young man, Louis de La Trémoille, who was the elder son and heir to the Duc de Noirmoutier (one of the leaders of the Fronde). However, La Trémoille had to flee to Spain after a disastrous duel, and Françoise-Athénaïs was betrothed to Montespan. The wedding ceremony took place in a chapel at the Église Saint-Eustache, Paris. Françoise later recounted that as she had neglected to bring along the proper kneeling cushions for the ceremony, the couple had to kneel on dog cushions. She and her new husband eventually fell in love and soon became pregnant with their first child, Christine. Two weeks after her daughter's birth she danced in a Court Ballet, and less than a year later her second child was born.

The couple lived in a small house close to the Louvre, which allowed Madame de Montespan to attend court and carry out her duties there as a lady-in-waiting to the Duchess of Orléans. She quickly established herself as the "reigning beauty of the court". Beauty, however, was only one of Madame de Montespan's many charms. She was a cultured and amusing conversationalist, who won the admiration of such literary figures as letter-writer Madame de Sévigné and diarist Saint-Simon. In addition, she kept abreast of political events. This had the effect of making her even more appealing to men of intellect and power. She was courted by a number of suitors including Louis de Buade de Frontenac and Charles Auguste de la Fare.

== Rise as Maîtresse-en-titre ==
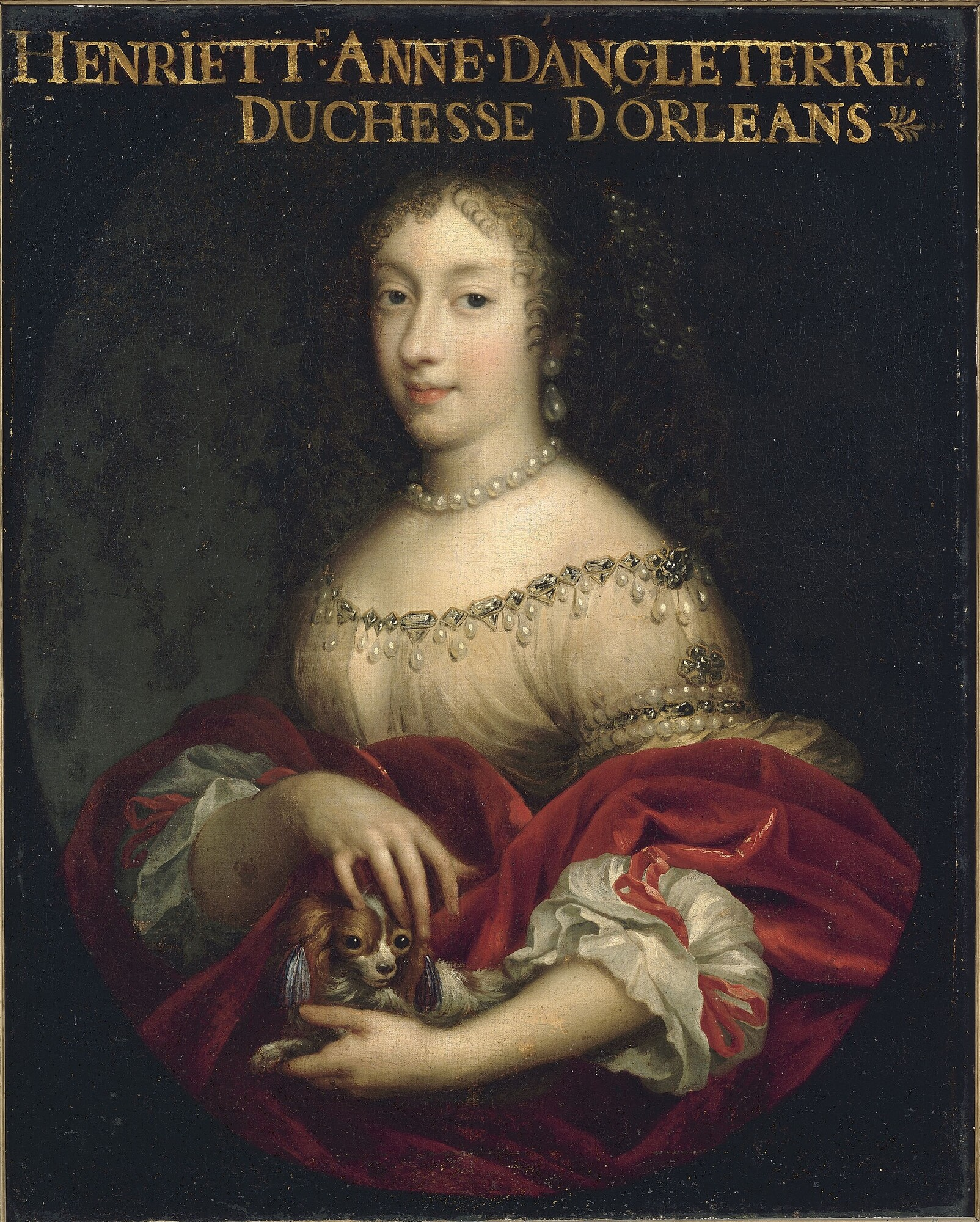
Henrietta Anne of England, to whom Madame de Montespan was a lady-in-waiting

Madame de Montespan astounded the court by openly resenting the position of Queen Maria Theresa of Spain. The daughter of King Philip IV of Spain and Elisabeth de France, the Queen's Spanish title, before her marriage, was Infanta María Teresa de Austria. In France, she was known as Marie-Thérèse d'Autriche. A scandal arose when the Duchess of Montausier, Governess of the Children of France and lady-in-waiting to the Queen, was accused of acting as a go-between in order to secure the governorship of the Dauphin for her husband, the Duke of Montausier.

By 1666, Madame de Montespan was trying to take the place of Louis XIV's current mistress, Louise de La Vallière. Using her wit and charm, she sought to ingratiate herself with the king. She also became close to the Dauphin, whose affection for her never wavered. Even though Louise de La Vallière knew that Montespan was trying to conquer the King's heart and reportedly laughed at her miserable efforts, she definitely underestimated her new rival. Montespan cleverly cultivated friendships with both Louise and Queen Maria Theresa and when both ladies were pregnant, Madame de Montespan was asked to help them entertain the King during private dinners. Soon they regretted their decision, for Montespan now cultivated an intimate relationship with the King. Madame de Montespan was also said to have seduced the King by dropping her towel obligingly when she spotted Louis spying on her while she showered. Shortly after, Louise's position was diminished to second place. To conceal his new relationship, the King placed the ladies in connected rooms so he could have access to both. Louise left court and joined a convent perhaps through regret and religiosity or because she had no other option. The spotlight belonged now to the twenty-five-year-old Athénaïs de Montespan.

She also became friends at court with another lady-in-waiting to the queen, Louise Boyer, the wife of Anne Jules de Noailles. Montespan's youngest son, the Count of Toulouse, would later marry one of Boyer's granddaughters.

=== Illegitimate children ===
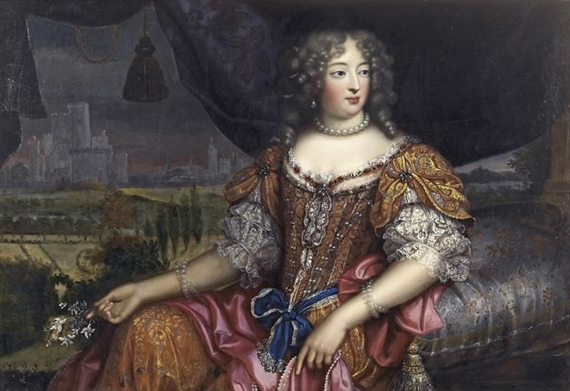
Mme de Montespan, by Pierre Mignard, c.1670

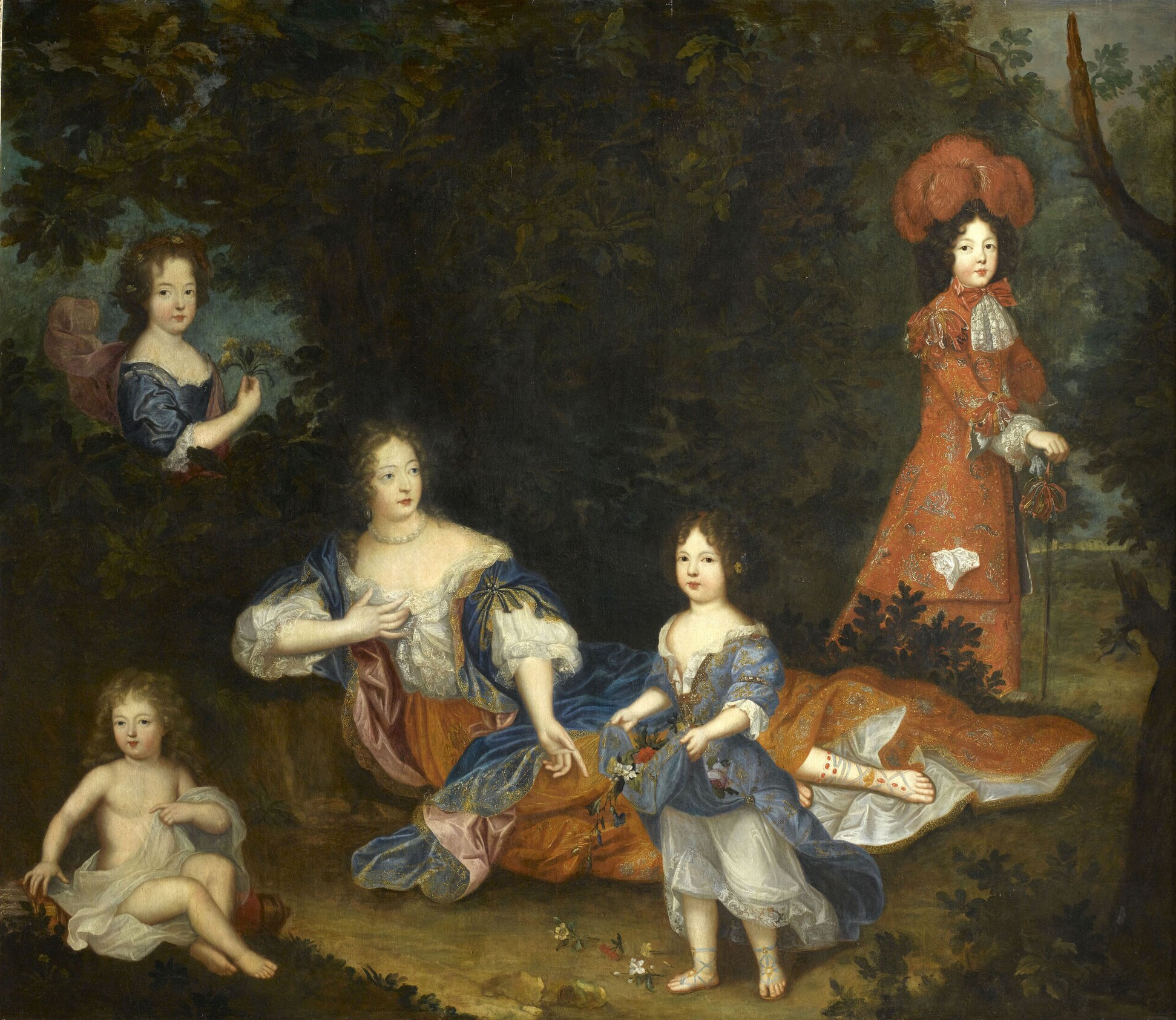
Madame de Montespan and four of her children: Mademoiselle de Nantes; Count of Vexin; Mademoiselle de Tours; Duke of Maine

The first of Madame de Montespan's seven children with the king was born in 1669. The newborn child, a girl, is thought to have been named Louise-Françoise. The upbringing of this first child (and subsequent children) was entrusted to one of Madame de Montespan's friends, Madame Scarron (the future marquise de Maintenon). A son, Louis-Auguste, was born in 1670. When the third child, Louis-César, was born in 1672, a house was purchased for Scarron and the children on the Rue Vaugirard.

In 1673, the couple's three living illegitimate children were legitimised by Louis XIV and given the royal surname of de Bourbon. The eldest, a son, Louis-Auguste de Bourbon, became the duc du Maine; the second child, a son, Louis-César de Bourbon, became the comte de Vexin; and the third, a daughter, Louise-Françoise de Bourbon, became Mademoiselle de Nantes and, in 1685, married the son of the head of the House of Condé, a cadet branch of the reigning House of Bourbon. As Madame de Montespan spent most of her time immersed in the social whirl of the court, the three had little contact with their busy mother and spent most of their childhood with their governess, Madame Scarron.

In 1674, an official separation with her husband was declared by the Procureur général Achille de Harlay, assisted by six judges at the Châtelet.

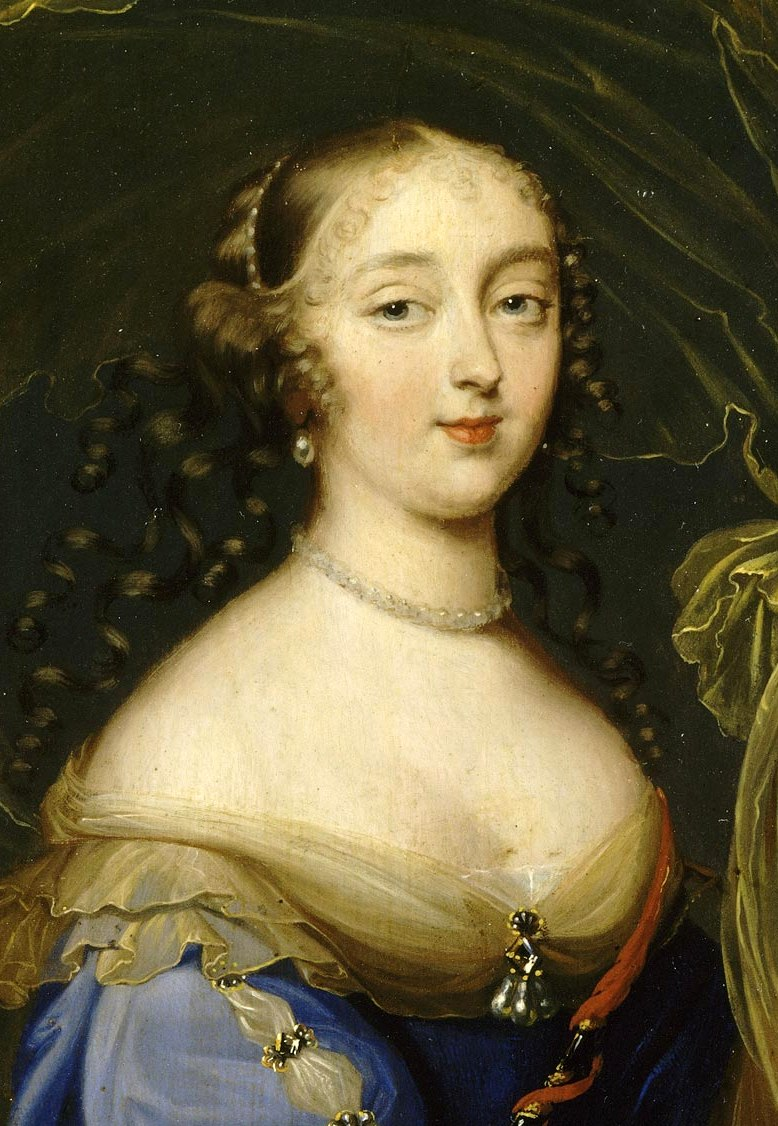
Madame de Montespan by unknown artist, c. 1675

Due to her role in royal adultery, the Roman Catholic Church soon became her adversary. In 1675, the priest Lécuyer refused to give her absolution, which was necessary for her to take Easter communion, a requisite for all Catholics. Father Lécuyer raged,

Is this the Madame that scandalises all France? Go abandon your shocking life and then come throw yourself at the feet of the ministers of Jesus Christ.

The King appealed to the priest's superiors, but the Church refused to yield to the king's demands. After a short separation, the King and Madame de Montespan resumed their relationship, resulting in the birth of two more children, Françoise Marie de Bourbon, Mademoiselle de Blois, in 1677, and Louis-Alexandre de Bourbon, comte de Toulouse, in 1678. Both were to be legitimised in 1681.

== Royal scandal and fall ==
=== Affaire des Poisons ===
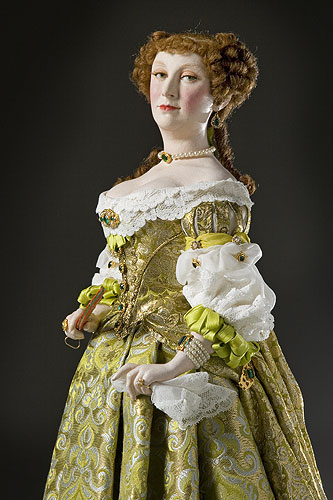
Marquise de Montespan from the George S. Stuart Gallery of Historical Figures

Louis XIV. He first met Madame de Montespan at the Palais du Louvre.

The Affaire des Poisons, which erupted in September 1677, was to be the beginning of the end of the reign of La Montespan. Suspicion that Montespan might be capable of murder began when the King's eye strayed to another beauty, Marie Angélique de Scorailles. Before any further developments in her romance with the King could occur, Marie Angélique died in 1681 from natural causes. Nevertheless, numerous rumors began circulating that she had been poisoned by her rival.

Long assumed to have been involved in the infamous Affaire des Poisons, Madame de Montespan has never been conclusively implicated. Gabriel Nicolas de la Reynie, Paris' first Lieutenant General of Police and the chief judge of the court, before whom the famous poisoning cases were brought, heard testimony that placed Madame de Montespan's first visits to the so-called witch Catherine Monvoisin, known as La Voisin, in 1665. In 1666, Madame de Montespan supposedly went so far as to allow a priest, Étienne Guibourg, to perform a black mass over her nude body in a blood-soaked ceremony, which also, allegedly, included infant sacrifice. Whatever the truth in these allegations, in July 1667, Madame de Montespan became the king's new mistress even though Louise de La Vallière was carrying his child, Louis de Bourbon, comte de Vermandois.

In addition to seeking Louis' love, court gossip accused Madame de Montespan with also conspiring to kill him, but inconsistencies in this testimony suggest that the royal mistress was innocent of these charges. However, suspicion was thrown onto Madame de Montespan because the name of her maid, Mlle Desœillets, was frequently mentioned in connection with La Voisin in the evidence brought before the Chambre Ardente.

From the end of 1680 onwards, Louvois, Jean-Baptiste Colbert, and Madame de Maintenon all helped to hush up the affair in order to prevent further scandal about the mother of the king's legitimised children. Concerning the king's need to avoid scandal, Police Chief La Reynie said:

the enormity of their crimes proved their safeguard.

=== Exile ===
In 1691, no longer in royal favour, Madame de Montespan retired to the Filles de Saint-Joseph convent, in the rue Saint-Dominique in Paris, with a pension of half a million francs. In gratitude for her departure, the king made her brother the duc de Vivonne, a marshal of France.

In 1700, Madame de Montespan acquired the Château d'Oiron, thereby abandoning the hospice of Fontevraud from 1703 and moved there in 1704 after the death of her sister Gabrielle. In her long retirement, Madame de Montespan donated vast sums to hospitals and charities. She was also a generous patron of the arts and letters and befriended Corneille, Racine, and La Fontaine.

== Death ==
In her later years, Madame de Montespan withdrew from court life and devoted herself increasingly to religious observance and charitable works. In May 1707, she traveled to Bourbon-l’Archambault for treatment of an illness and died there on 27 May 1707 at the age of sixty-six. Following her death, Louis XIV reportedly forbade their children from wearing mourning for her.

== Appearance and personality ==
Athénaïs was considered "astonishingly beautiful" by the standards of her time. She had large blue eyes, long, thick, corn-coloured hair that fell in curls about her shoulders, and a curvaceous, voluptuous body. She was droll, amusing and used her considerable wit to mock others.

She also had an extravagant and demanding nature and possessed enough charm to get what she wanted. She was expensive and glorious, like the Palace of Versailles itself. Her apartments were filled with pet animals and thousands of flowers and she had a private gallery. Costly jewels were showered upon her and she was highly discriminating regarding the quality of the gems, returning them if they did not meet her exacting standards. She was given the nickname Quanto ("How much", in Italian). Her love for food and her numerous pregnancies caused her to gain weight in her late thirties.

== Children by Louis XIV ==
Name	Birth	Death	Notes
Louise Françoise de Bourbon	at the end of March 1669	23 February 1672 (aged 2)	
Louis Auguste, Duke of Maine	31 March 1670	14 May 1736 (aged 66)	Legitimised on 20 December 1673. Held numerous offices, of which: Colonel General of the Suisses et Grisons, Governor of Languedoc, General of the Galleys, and Grand Master of Artillery. Also Duke of Aumale, Count of Eu and Prince of Dombes. Had issue. Founder of the Maine Line.
Louis César, Count of Vexin	20 June 1672	10 January 1683 (aged 10)	Legitimised on 20 December 1673.
Louise Françoise de Bourbon	1 June 1673	16 June 1743 (aged 70)	Legitimised on 20 December 1673. Married Louis III, Prince of Condé.
Louise Marie Anne de Bourbon	12 November 1674	15 September 1681 (aged 6)	Legitimised in January 1676.
Françoise Marie de Bourbon	9 February 1677	1 February 1749 (aged 72)	Legitimised in November 1681. Married Philippe II, Duke of Orléans, the Regent of France under Louis XV.
Louis Alexandre, Count of Toulouse	6 June 1678	1 December 1737 (aged 59)	Legitimised on 22 November 1681. Held numerous offices, of which: Admiral of France, Governor of Guyenne, Governor of Brittany, and Grand Huntsman of France. Also Duke of Damville, of Rambouillet and of Penthièvre.

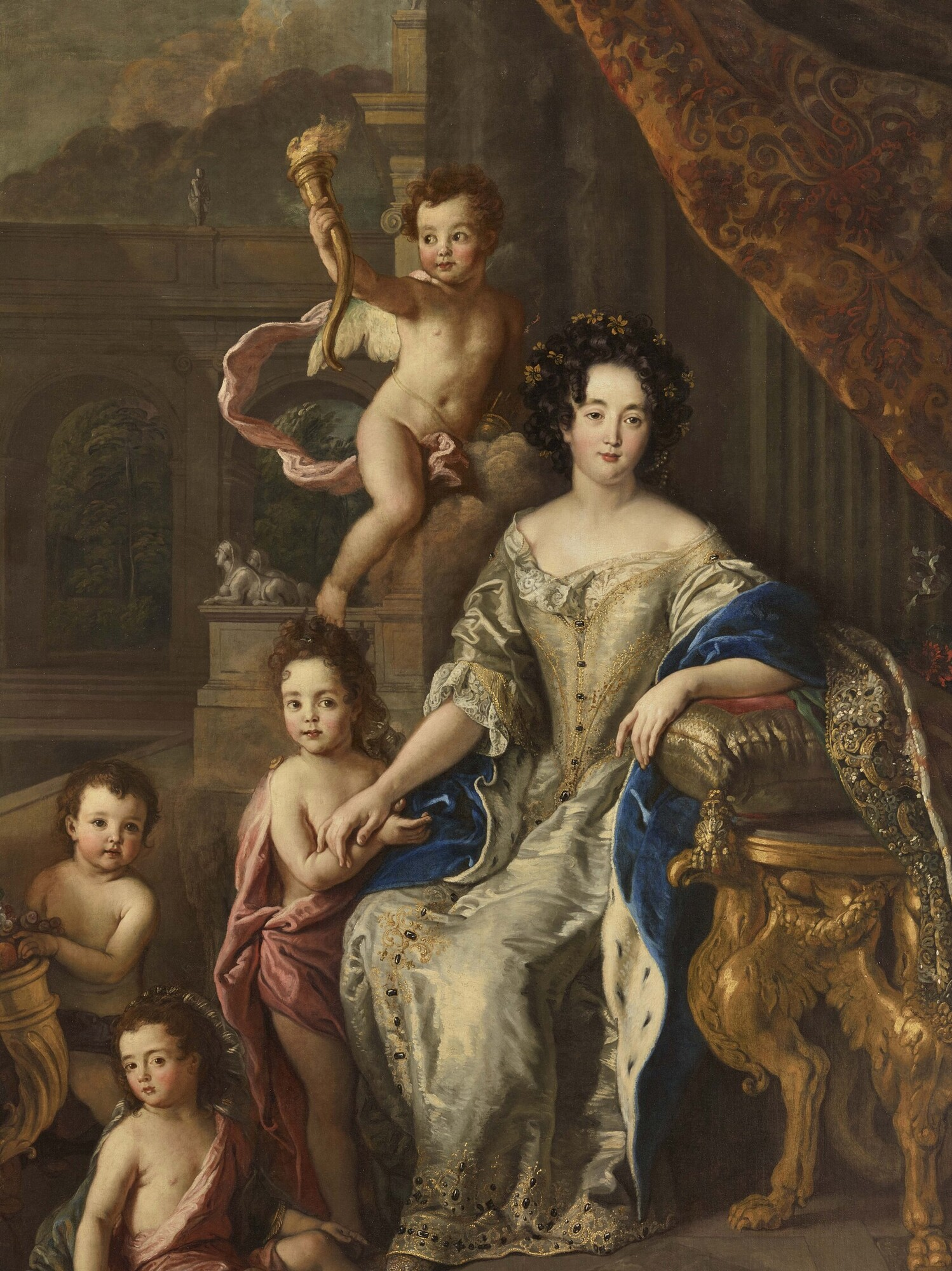
With her children, about 1677

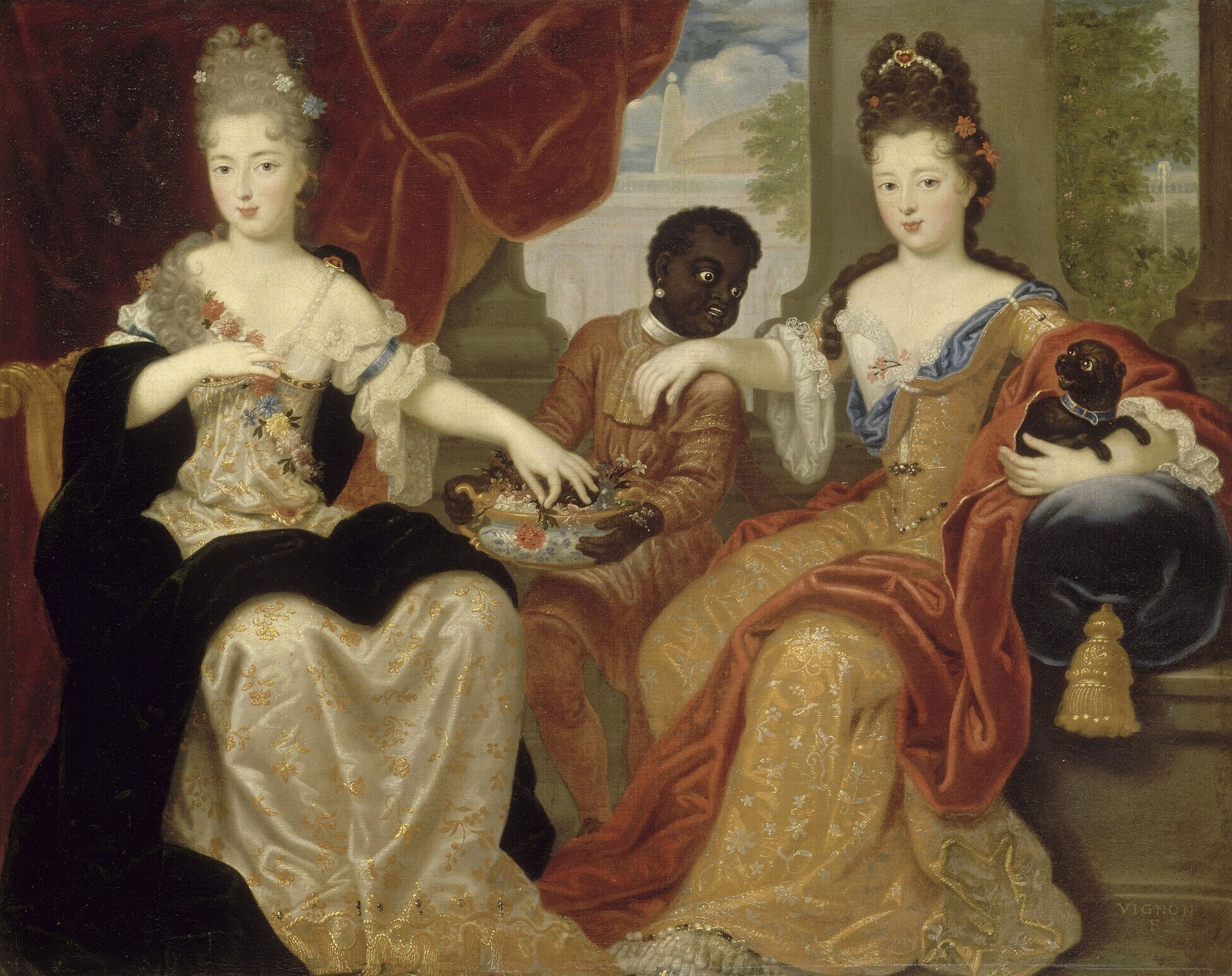
Madame de Montespan's two surviving daughters with an enslaved Black attendant: the blonde Mademoiselle de Blois, with her older brunette sister, the Mademoiselle de Nantes

Louise Françoise some time after her marriage to Louis III, Prince of Condé

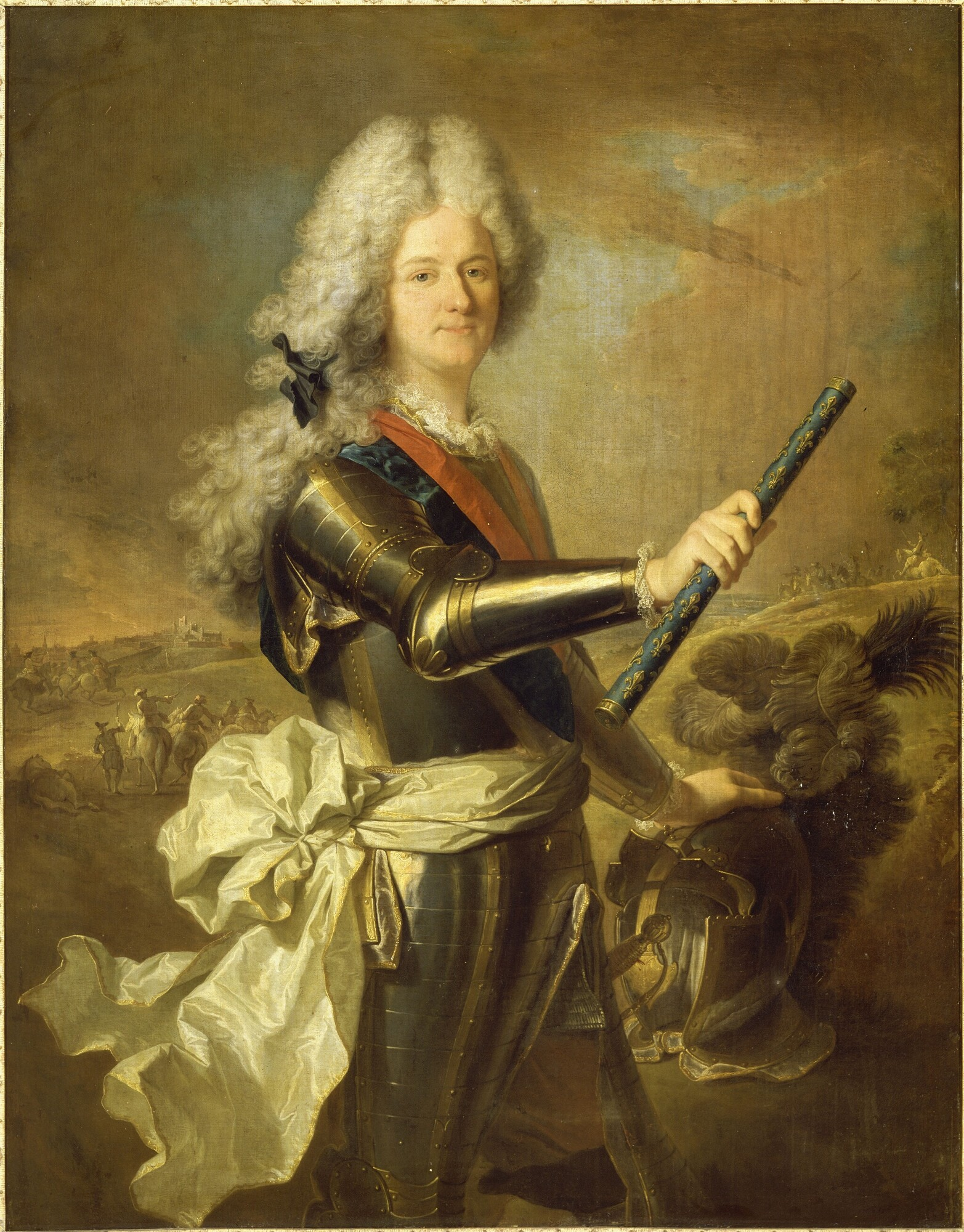
The Count of Toulouse, Madame de Montespan's youngest child

== Legacy ==
=== Château de Clagny ===
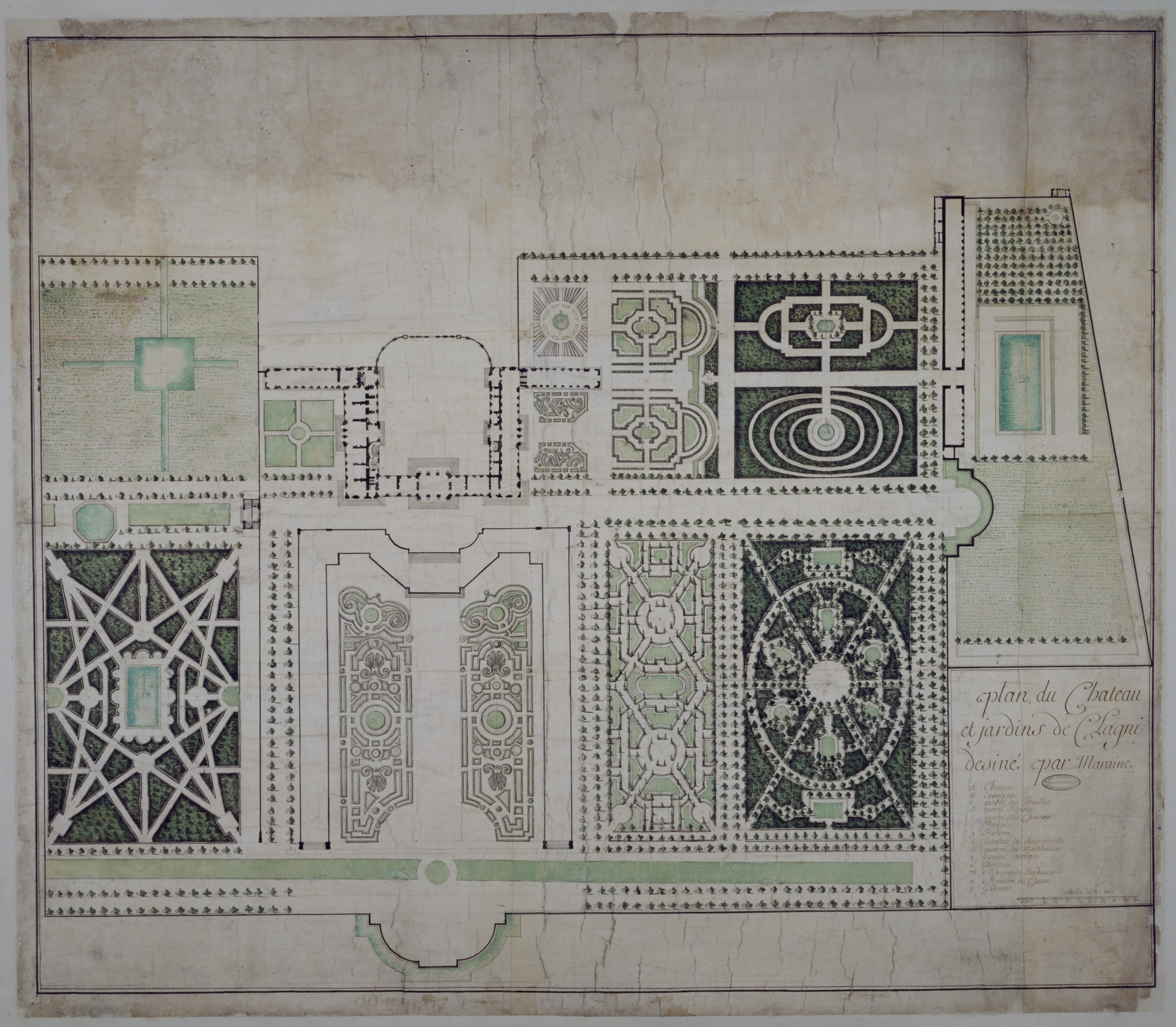
A plan of the Château de Clagny and its gardens

The Château de Clagny in Versailles was built between 1674 and 1680 from the drawings of Jules Hardouin-Mansart, Premier architecte du Roi, (First architect of the King), on land bought by Louis XIV in 1665. Madame de Sévigné wrote that its construction employed 1,200 workers and the cost was no less than 2 million livres. The royal gardener André Le Nôtre created the gardens, which looked west toward the much larger palace of Versailles, of which Clagny was a smaller version. The Château de Clagny was also famed for its gallery. In 1685, Louis XIV gave the magnificent palace to Madame de Montespan. At her death, her oldest son, the duc du Maine, inherited Clagny and, in turn, passed it on to his son, Louis-Auguste de Bourbon, prince de Dombes. The château reverted to the French crown in 1766 and was demolished in 1769.

=== Trianon de porcelaine ===
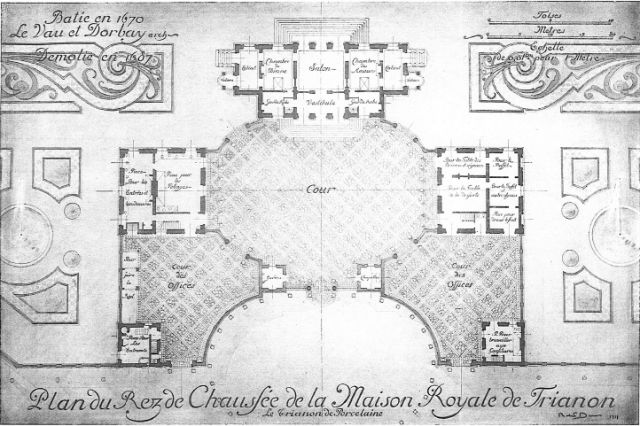
A plan of the Trianon de Porcelaine

Louis XIV also had a pleasure pavilion, called the Trianon de Porcelaine near Versailles, purchased and built for Madame de Montespan, surrounded by gardens, on the site of the former hamlet of Trianon. It was meant as a hideaway for the couple, and also where she sought to escape from court life.

Because of the fragility of the earthenware tiles used in its construction, the Trianon de porcelaine was demolished in 1687 and replaced by the Grand Trianon of pink marble (marbre rose des Pyrénées).

== In popular culture ==
In the 1979 comedy movie Love at First Bite, Dracula's servant Renfield mentions one of his master's past loves, the Countess de Montespan.

In the 2000 film, Vatel, Madame de Montespan is portrayed by Marine Delterme.

Anna Brewster portrayed Madame de Montespan in the Canal+ series Versailles from 2015 to 2018.

"Athénaïs" appears in Clare Pollard's novel "The Modern Fairies".

In the 2014 movie A Little Chaos, Madame de Montespan is portrayed by actress Jennifer Ehle.

== Notes ==
Court offices
Preceded by Olympia Mancini, Countess of Soissons	Surintendante de la Maison de la Reine to the Queen of France; 1679–1683	Succeeded by Marie Anne de Bourbon (1697–1741)
