= Louise Marie Anne de Bourbon =

- Légitimée de France; Mademoiselle de Tours
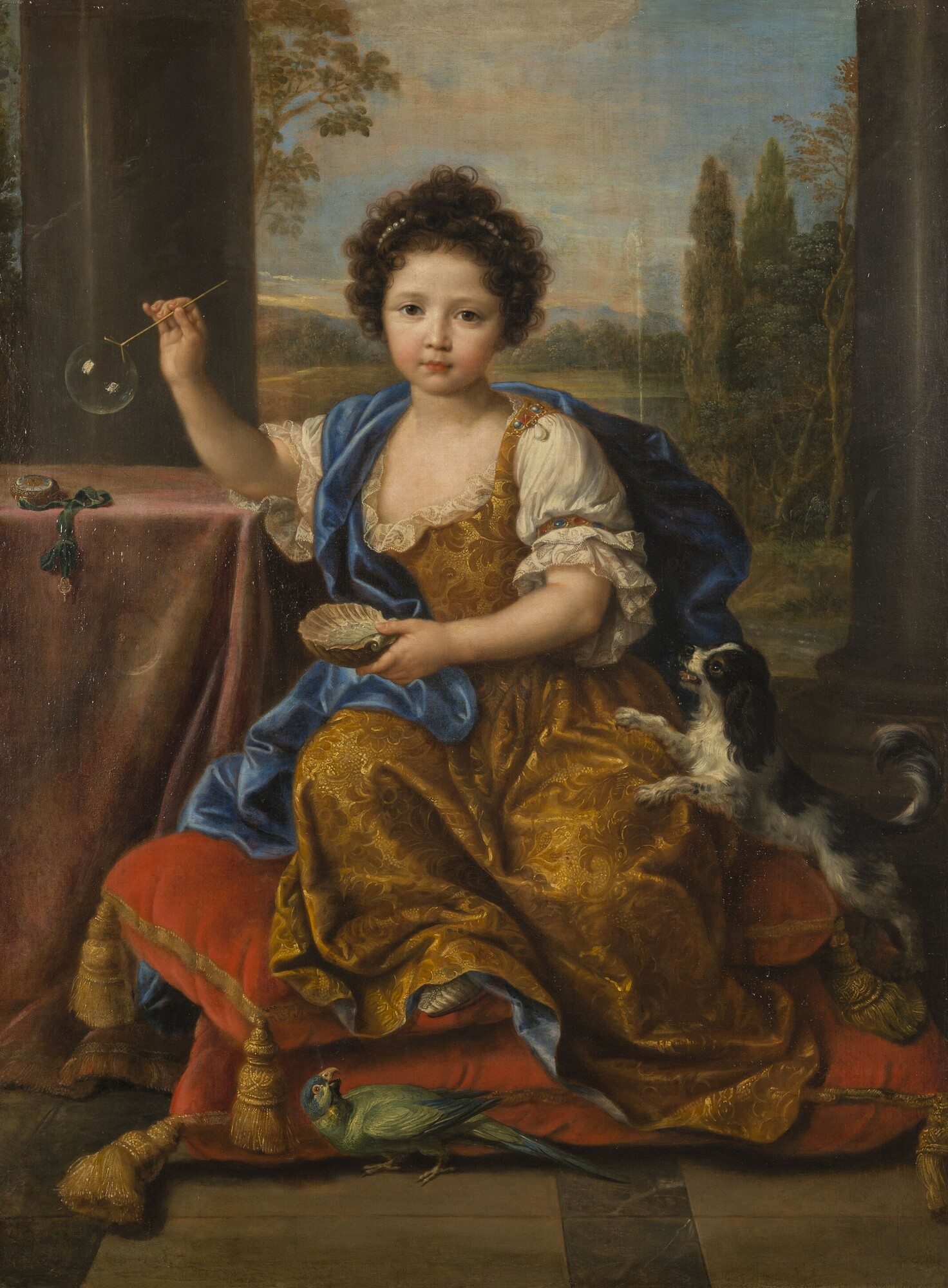
- Posthumous painting by Pierre Mignard
- Born: 18 November 1674; Saint-Germain-en-Laye, France
- Died: 15 September 1681 (aged 6); Bourbon-l'Archambault, France
- Father: Louis XIV, King of France
- Mother: Athénaïs, Marquise de Montespan

Louise Marie Anne de Bourbon, Légitimée de France, Mademoiselle de Tours (Saint-Germaine-en-Laye, 18 November 1674 – Bourbon, 15 September 1681) was the illegitimate daughter of Louis XIV and his most famous maîtresse-en-titre, Madame de Montespan. She died in early childhood.

== Biography ==
Louise Marie Anne de Bourbon was born at the Château de Saint-Germain-en-Laye on 18 November 1674. She was the couple's third daughter and their fifth child. She was legitimised by her father Louis XIV in January 1676 at the age of almost two. Her parents affectionately dubbed her Toutou after her title.

After her birth, her care was entrusted into the hands of Madame Scarron who had taken care of her older siblings in a house bought for them by their father on the Rue de Vaugirard, then in the suburbs of Paris. Known as Louise Marie, she was born after the official separation of Madame de Montespan and her legal husband.

After her legitimisation in 1676, she gained the style of Mademoiselle de Tours from the town of Tours in France. Growing up in Paris, she was adored by her oldest sister Louise-Françoise de Bourbon, who was known as Mademoiselle de Nantes. Some three years after her birth, she was joined by another sister, Françoise-Marie de Bourbon – future wife of Philippe d'Orléans Régent of France. Then in 1678 her last full brother was born at Clagny, Louis-Alexandre de Bourbon. The latter two were made legitimate in November 1681.

She was known as Mademoiselle de Tours until her premature death in 1681, at the age of six of Tuberculosis

She died at Bourbon-l'Archambault. Her father, who was at Fontainebleau, ordered that his beloved daughter be buried at the tomb of the Dukes of Bourbon.

After her death, writing to the duc du Maine, her mother said:

I do not speak to you of my grief, you are naturally too good not to have experienced it for yourself. As for Mademoiselle de Nantes, she has felt it as deeply as if she were twenty and has received the visits of the Queen and Madame la Dauphine.

Her mother was said to have been badly affected by her death but was unable to attend the child's funeral, which occurred four days after her death, as a result of being otherwise engaged with the incarceration of the duc de Lauzun.

== Ancestry ==
Ancestors of Louise Marie Anne de Bourbon

8. Henry IV of France
4. Louis XIII of France
9. Marie de' Medici
2. Louis XIV of France
10. Philip III of Spain
5. Anne of Austria
11. Margaret of Austria
1. Louise Marie Anne de Bourbon
12. Gaspard de Rochechouart, marquis de Mortemart
6. Gabriel de Rochechouart, duc de Mortemart
13. Louise de Maure, comtesse de Maure
3. Madame de Montespan
14. Jean de Grandseigne, marquis de Marsillac
7. Diane de Grandseigne
15. Catherine de La Béraudière, dame de Villenon
