= Diane Gabrielle Damas =

French aristocrat (1656–1715)

- Mademoiselle de Thianges
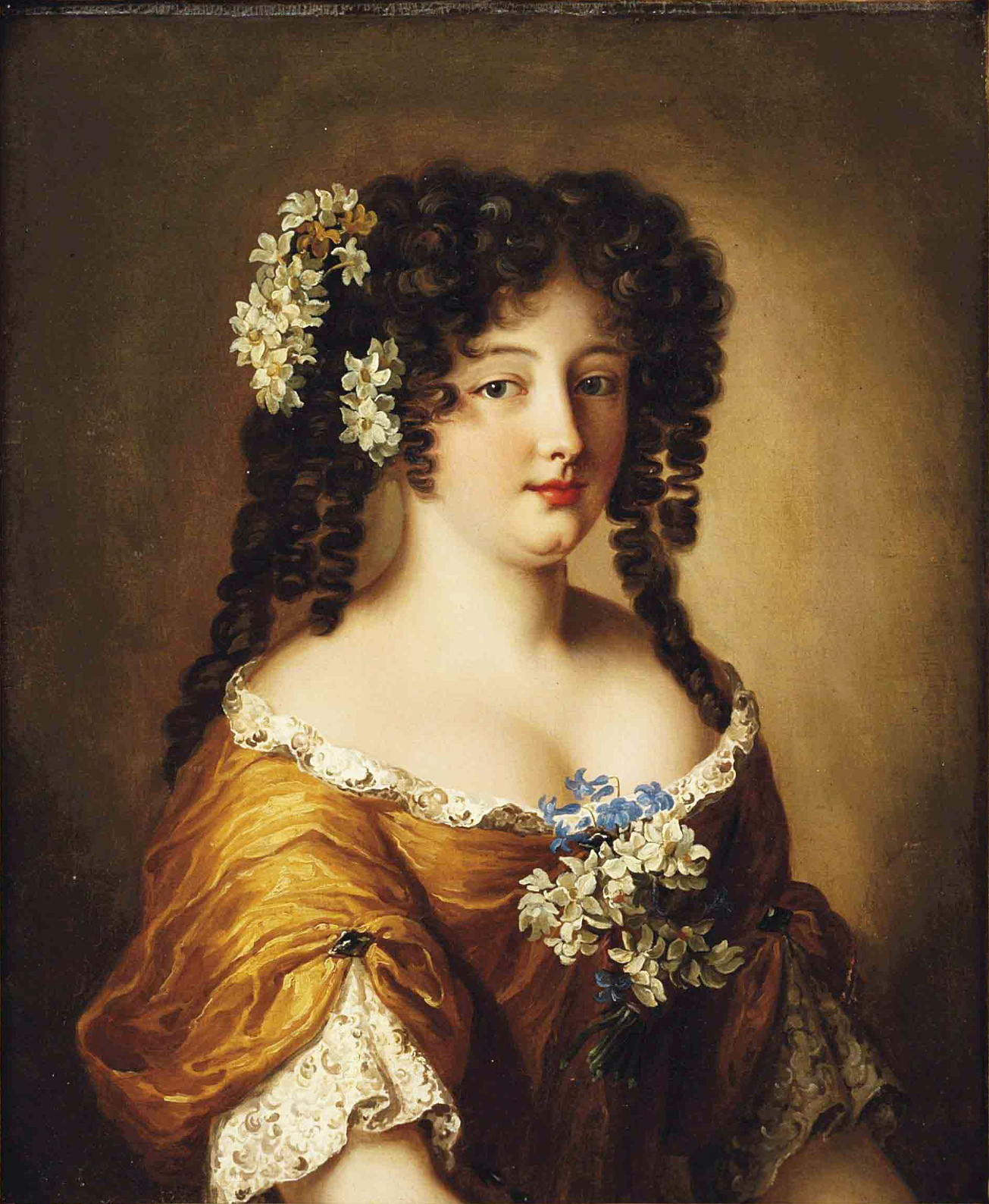
- Portrait by Jacob Ferdinand Voet

Duchess of Nevers
- Reign: December 15, 1670 – May 8, 1707
- Predecessor: Diane de La Marck
- Successor: Marianna Spinola
- Born: 1656
- Died: 11 January 1715 (aged 58); Paris, France
- Noble family: Damas
- Spouse: Philippe Jules Mancini, Duke of Nevers (m. 1670; died 1707)
- Issue: Diane Gabrielle Victoire Mancini; Philippe Jules François Mancini; Diane Adélaïde Philippe Mancini; Jacques Hippolyte Mancini
- Father: Claude Leonor Damas, Marquis of Thianges
- Mother: Gabrielle de Rochechouart de Mortemart

Diane Gabrielle Damas (1656 – 11 January 1715) was a French noblewoman and aristocrat. She was born into the House of Damas as the daughter of Claude Leonor Damas, the Marquis of Thianges. Diane was also thought to have been a mistress of Louis XIV and a member of the Order of the Honey Bee.

== Early life ==
Born in 1656, Diane Gabrielle Damas was the daughter of Claude Leonor Damas, Marquis of Thianges and his wife; Gabrielle de Rochechouart de Mortemart, who was the sister to Madame de Montespan. Through her mother, she was the granddaughter of Gabriel de Rochechouart de Mortemart, the 1st Duke of Mortemart.

Growing up, Diane was educated in the Abbaye-aux-Bois, a convent founded in Ognolles. Diane was often noted for her beauty; according to Madame de Sévigné, Mademoiselle de Thianges was "young, pretty, and modest." Diane was also mentioned occasionally in the Memoirs of the Duc de Saint-Simon.

Louis de Rouvroy, duc de Saint-Simon, once wrote how Diane often outshone her sisters:

"Mrs. de Thianges dominated her two sisters, and even the king, whom she amused more than they did. As long as she lived, she dominated him, and retained, even after the expulsion of Mrs. de Montespan from the court, the greatest privations and unique distinctions [...]. Mrs. de Montespan since her love life, and even Mrs. de Thianges [...], during the lifetime of their husbands, gave up their arms and their livery which they never took back, and always wore those of Rochechouart alone."

== Marriage ==
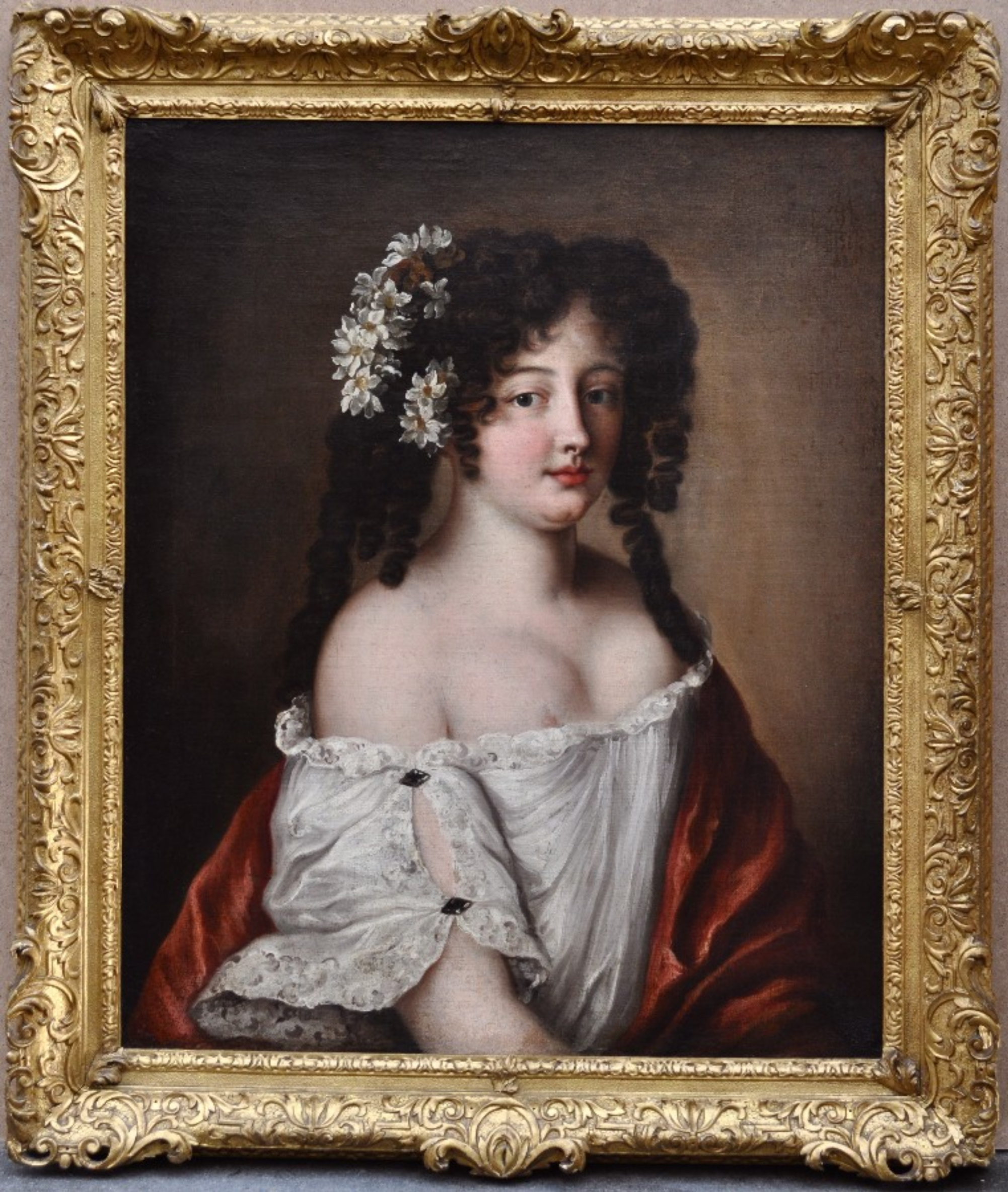
Portrait by Jacob Ferdinand Voet c. 1670s

Portrait by Jacob Ferdinand Voet c. 1672

On December 14, 1670, Diane married into the family of Mancini-Mazarini, via Philippe Jules Mancini, a nephew of Cardinal Mazarin. The wedding took place in the Tuileries Palace, Paris. Following the marriage, Diane by marriage was deemed the Duchess consort of Nevers. Diane was also sister-in-law to the infamous Mazarinettes. The marriage produced four children: Diane Gabrielle Victoire Mancini (1672–1716), Philippe Jules François Mancini (1676–1768), Diane Adélaïde Philippe Mancini (1687–1747), and lastly, Jacques Hippolyte Mancini (1690–1759).

== Death ==
On May 8, 1707, Diane received the news of her husband's death. Although the relationship was rocky, the death of her spouse still managed to affect her deeply in a way. Finally, on January 11, 1715, aged 58, Diane died peacefully in Paris, France.

== Titles, Honors, Coat of Arms ==
- 1656 – 15 December 1670 Mademoiselle de Thianges
- 15 December 1670 – 8 May 1707 Duchess of Nevers
- 8 May 1707 – 11 January 1715 Dowager Duchess of Nevers

Member of the Order of the Honey Bee.

Coats of arms of the House of Damas

Coat of arms of House of Rochechouart

Coat of arms of the House of Mancini-Mazarini

== Ancestry ==
Ancestors of Diane Gabrielle Damas

8. François Damas, Baron de Thianges
4. Charles Damas, Comte de Thianges et de Chalencey
2. Claude Leonor Damas, Marquis of Thianges
10. Urbain de la Chambre
5. Jeanne de La Chambre
11. Aimée de Corgenon
1. Diane Gabrielle Damas
12. Gaspard de Rochechouart de Mortemart
6. Gabriel de Rochechouart de Mortemart
13. Louise de Maure
3. Gabrielle de Rochechouart de Mortemart
14. Jean de Grandseigne
7. Diane de Grandseigne
15. Catherine de la Béraudière

=== Issue ===
By Philippe Jules Mancini, Duke of Nevers

Name	Portrait	Lifespan	Age	Notes
Diane Gabrielle Victoire Mancini; Princess of Chimay		1672 – 12 September 1716	44 years	Diane was the wife of Charles Louis Henin-Liétard, 2nd Prince of Chimay. Prior to her engagement, she was known as "Mademoiselle de Nevers". On 12 September 1616, Diane died at age 44. The marriage was childless and resulted in no issue.
Philippe Jules François Mancini; 3rd Duke of Nevers		1676 – 1768	96 years	Philippe was the husband of Marianna Spinola, Legally he wasn't Duke of Nevers until the law of "Parlement of Paris". By his father-in-law, He was granted the following titles; Prince of Vergagne, Grandee of Spain etc. The marriage had issue.
Diane Adélaïde Philippe Mancini; Duchess of Estrées		1687 – 1747	60 years	Diane was the wife of Louis Armand d'Estrées, Duke of Estrées. The marriage was childless and resulted in no issue.
Jacques Hippolyte Mancini; Marquis of Mancini		2 March 1690 – 1759	69 years	Jacques was the husband of Anne Louise de Noailles, He was styled Marquis of Mancini as a member of the Mancini family. The marriage had issue. Ancestor of Jules de Polignac

=== Descendants ===
Diane was an ancestor of Jules de Polignac, 1st Duke of Polignac and his spouse; Yolande de Polastron including their children as well; Aglaé de Polignac (1768–1803), Armand de Polignac (1777–1847), Jules de Polignac, 3rd Duke of Polignac (1780–1847), and Melchior de Polignac (1781–1855). She was also ancestor to his grandchildren, Prince Edmond de Polignac, Camille Armand Jules Marie, Prince de Polignac, Aglaé de Gramont, Alphonse de Polignac, Ludovic de Polignac, Héraclius de Gramont, 9th Duke of Gramont, Corisande de Gramont, Jules-Armand de Polignac, Yolande de Polignac, Charles de Polignac.

=== 21st-century ===
Through Prince Pierre, Duke of Valentinois, she is a direct ancestor of Albert II of Monaco, in other words, the current or present Prince of Monaco.
