= House of Damas =

Coats of arms of the House of Damas

The House of Damas is one of France's oldest noble families, recorded since the 9th century and including lords of Vergy, counts of Vermandois and barons of Semur.

== Notable members ==
- Sybille of Bâgé, daughter of Guy I Damas de Baugé, Baron of Couzan, wife of Amadeus V, Count of Savoy.
- Hugh of Cluny, abbot of Cluny Abbey and builder of the 'Cluny III' phase there.
- Gabrielle de Rochechouart de Mortemart (1633–1693), she married Claude Leonor de Damas Marquis de Thianges (House of Damas).
- Étienne-Charles de Damas-Crux (1754-1846), he was a French soldier and politician.
- Joseph-François-Louis-Charles de Damas (1758-1829), he was a French general.
- François-Étienne de Damas (1764-1828), he was a French general.
- Roger de Damas (1765-1823), he was a French Army officer and Royalist general.
- Ange Hyacinthe Maxence, baron de Damas (1785–1862), he was a French Duke and a Minister.
- Diane Gabrielle Damas (1656–1715), she was Duchess of Nevers, through marriage into the House of Mancini-Mazarin via Philippe Jules Mancini, Duke of Nevers.
