= Thianges =

- Commune
- Location of Thianges
- Location within France Location within Bourgogne-Franche-Comté
- Coordinates: 46°54′41″N 3°30′00″E
- Country: France
- Region: Bourgogne-Franche-Comté
- Department: Nièvre
- Arrondissement: Nevers
- Canton: Imphy
- Intercommunality: Sud Nivernais

Government
  - Mayor (2020–2026): Roger Barbier
- Area^{1}: 12.80 km^{2} (4.94 sq mi)
- Highest elevation: 281 m (922 ft)
- Lowest elevation: 197 m (646 ft)
- Population (2023): 165
  - Density: 12.9/km^{2} (33.4/sq mi)
- Time zone: UTC+01:00 (CET)
  - Summer (DST): UTC+02:00 (CEST)
- INSEE/Postal code: 58291 /58260
- ^{1} French Land Register data, which excludes lakes, ponds, glaciers > 1 km^{2} (0.386 sq mi or 247 acres) and river estuaries.

Thianges (French pronunciation: [tjɑ̃ʒ]) is a commune in the Nièvre department in central France.

== See also ==
- Communes of the Nièvre department
- Gabrièlle de Rochechouart de Mortemart, Marquise de Thianges
- Diane Gabrielle Damas, Mademoiselle de Thianges
