= Palazzo Mancini =

Coordinates: 41°53′51″N 12°28′55″E

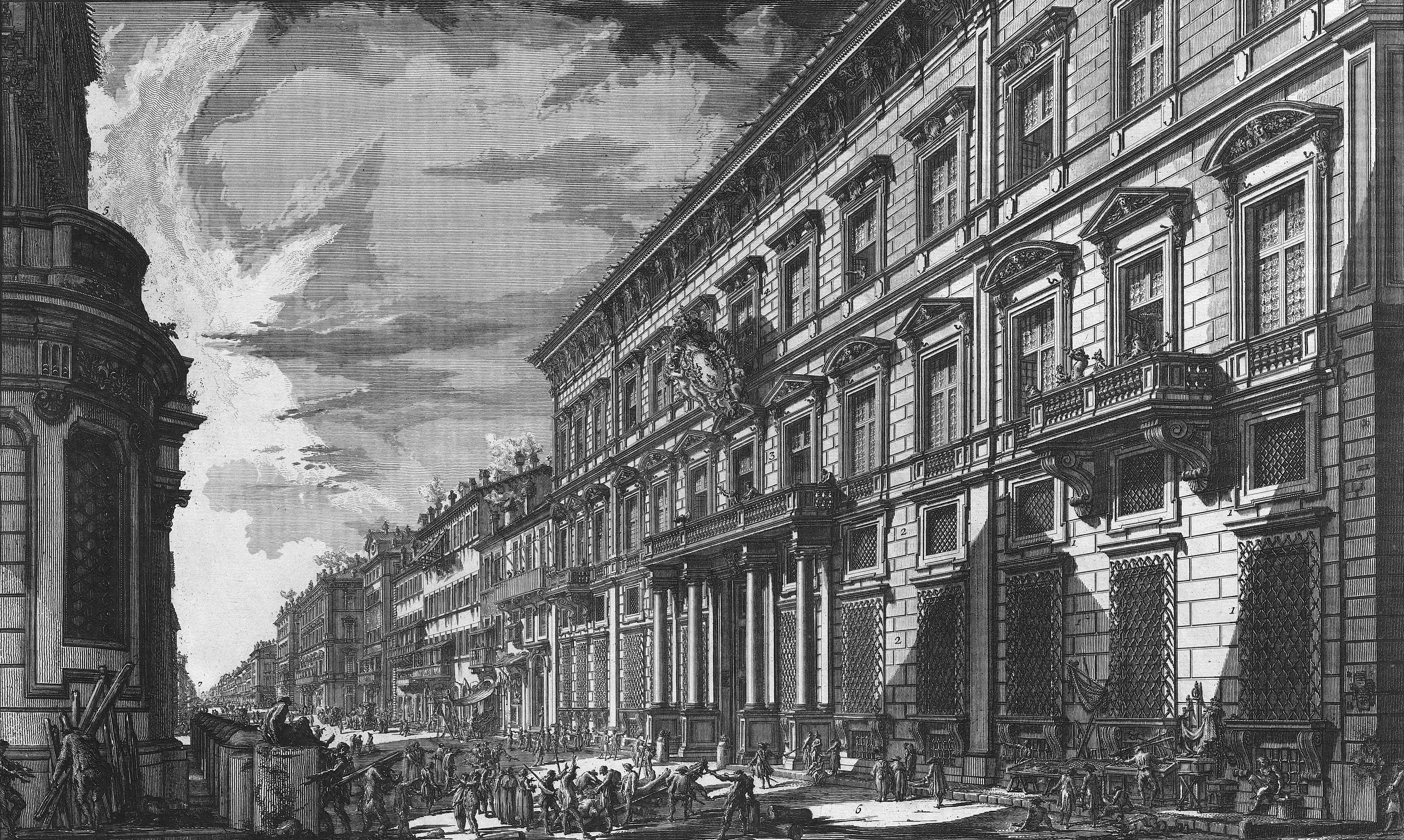
- Palazzo Mancini, Rome. Etching by Giovanni Battista Piranesi, 1752.
- Interactive map of the Palazzo Mancini area

General information
- Location: Rome, Italy

The Palazzo Mancini is a palazzo in Rome, Italy. From 1737 to 1793 it was the second home of the French Academy in Rome. It is located on Via del Corso, about a block north of Piazza Venezia.

== History ==
In 1634 Lorenzo Mancini, brother of cardinal Francesco Maria Mancini, married Geronima Mazzarino, sister of cardinal Mazarin. For their wedding celebrations, the old residence of the Mancini family was enlarged by the acquisition of four adjoining houses and a new building designed by the architect Carlo Rainaldi. The work was begun by Lorenzo and completed by Filippo Mancini, duke of Nevers, between 1687 and 1689.

The building features a facade with "bugne lisce", or 'fishbone'-style ashlar, with the central door surmounted by a rich balcony supported by brackets decorated from Cupids. Inside are preserved a painted frieze in the "salone di rappresentanza" or state room (the "Salone Rosso") and fragments of seventeenth-century friezes in other rooms with "Stories of David and Jacob". Another room houses a fresco collection of "vedute" of Rome by Bartolomeo Pinelli.

The Palazzo was leased to the French Academy in Rome in 1725, which was previously housed at the Palazzo Capranica. The Palazzo was eventually acquired in 1737 by order of Louis XV and adapted to its new function. One second floor room is still frescoed with scenes copied from the Raphael Rooms at the Vatican Palace, produced by the artists accommodated by the Palazzo during its time as the academy. After the anti-French riots of 1793 and the assassination of Bassville, the academy left the palace. After the French Revolution the building became the French Embassy to the Holy See. In 1798 the academy returned to the Palazzo, but after the French defeat by Suvorov in 1799 the building was occupied and pillaged.

In 1803 the academy was moved to the Villa Medici and in 1818 the Palazzo was bought by Louis Bonaparte, who ten years' later ceded it to Maria Theresia of Austria-Este, the widow of Victor Emmanuel I of Sardinia. It passed to her daughter Maria Christina of Savoy and, when Maria Christina became queen of Naples, it passed in 1831 to the Bourbons of Naples and in 1853 to Scipion Salviati. In 1919 the Banco di Sicilia acquired it.

== See also ==
- Mancini family
