= Maurice Rousseau =

French artistic gymnast

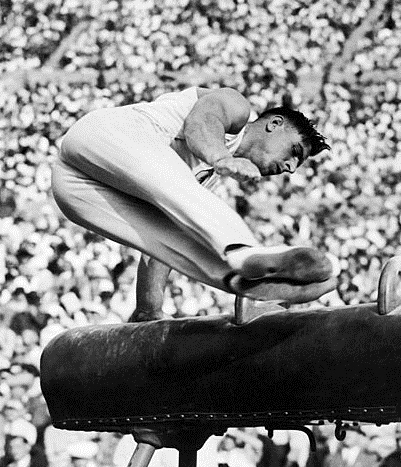
- Rousseau at the 1936 Summer Olympics

Personal information
- Full name: Louis Maurice Rousseau
- Born: 28 September 1906 La Machine, Nièvre, France
- Died: 22 August 1977 (aged 70) La Machine, Nièvre, France

Gymnastics career
- Discipline: Men's artistic gymnastics
- Country represented: France
- Gym: Saint-Ouen
Medal record
Men's artistic gymnastics
Representing France
World Championships
Silver medal – second place	1930 Luxembourg	Team

Louis Maurice Rousseau (28 September 1906 – 22 August 1977) was a French artistic gymnast. He competed at the 1936 Summer Olympics and finished eighth with the French team. His best individual result was 32nd place on the rings.
