= Diane de Grandseigne =

French noble (c. 1610–1666)

- Duchess of Mortemart
- Born: 1610; Lussac-les-Châteaux, Poitou, Kingdom of France
- Died: 11 February 1666 (aged 55–56); Poitiers, Kingdom of France
- Noble family: Rochechouart (by marriage)
- Spouse: Gabriel de Rochechouart, Duke of Mortemart (m. 1632)
- Issue: Gabrielle de Rochechouart de Mortemart, Louis Victor de Rochechouart de Mortemart, Madame de Montespan, Marie-Madeleine de Rochechouart
- Father: Jean de Grandseigne
- Mother: Catherine de La Béraudière
- Occupation: Lady-in-waiting

Diane de Grandseigne (c. 1610 – 11 February 1666), sometimes spelled as de Grandsaigne, was a French noblewoman and mother of Madame de Montespan.

== Biography ==
Diane was born sometime around 1610, she was the daughter of Jean de Grandseigne, Marquis of Marsillac, and Catherine de La Béraudière, Lady of Villenon. She was titled as Marquise of Grandseigne and was lady-in-waiting to Queen Anne of Austria. Diane was described to have been a pious and gentle woman.

=== Marriage and issue ===
In 1632, she married Gabriel de Rochechouart, a childhood friend of Louis XIII. The marriage was characterised by their opposite personalities. While Gabriel was a womanizer, Diane was a pious woman. An anecdote from the time is often used to summarize their relationship:

One evening, when he had come home very late as was his habit, she, who was waiting up for him, could not help but ask in a vexed tone:

"Where have you been? Will you spend your whole life like this with devils?"

To which M. de Mortemart replied:

"I do not know where I come from, but I do know that my devils are in a much better mood than your good angel." (Note: « Un soir qu'il était rentré fort tard à son ordinaire, elle, qui l'attendait, ne put s'empêcher de lui demander d'un ton chagrin : - D'où venez-vous ? Passerez-vous ainsi votre vie avec des diables ? À quoi M. de Mortemart répondit : - Je ne sais d'où je viens, mais je sais que mes diables sont de meilleure humeur que votre bon ange. »)

Despite the nature of the marriage, the couple had 5 children. Diane was reportedly a woman with a strong sense of maternal duty who raised her children with deep faith in God.

Name	Portrait	Lifespan	Notes
Louis Victor de Rochechouart; 2nd Duke of Mortemart		25 August 1636 - 15 December 1688	Born in Paris, he died at Chaillot; married and had 6 children; current descendants include the Dukes of Noailles;
Gabrielle de Rochechouart marquise of Thianges		1634- 12 September 1693	Married Claude Leonor Damas, Marquis of Thianges and had issue; her daughter Diane Gabrielle Damas de Thianges married Philippe Jules Mancini and had issue; current descendants include the Prince of Monaco through Prince Pierre, Duke of Valentinois, also a descendant of the duchesse de Polignac;
Françoise de Rochechouart; Athénaïs de Montespan; Madame de Montespan; Marquise of Montepsan		5 October 1641 – 27 May 1707	Born at the Château of Lussac-les-Châteaux, she married Louis Henri de Pardaillan de Gondrin and had issue; was King Louis XIV's maîtresse-en-titre and had issue including the future duc du Maine, Madame la Duchesse, Duchess of Orléans and Count of Toulouse;
Marie Christine de Rochechouart		?	Little is known of her;
Marie Madeleine de Rochechouart; Abbess of Fontevrault		1645 - 15 August 1704	Never married, entered the Abbey of Fontevraud as a nun, where she eventually became the abbess; known as the Reine des abbesses; through her writings, she is known as Gabrielle de Rochechouart.

=== Death ===
Diane died on 11 February 1666 in Poitiers.
