= Gabrielle de Rochechouart de Mortemart (nun) =

French Abbess (1645–1704)

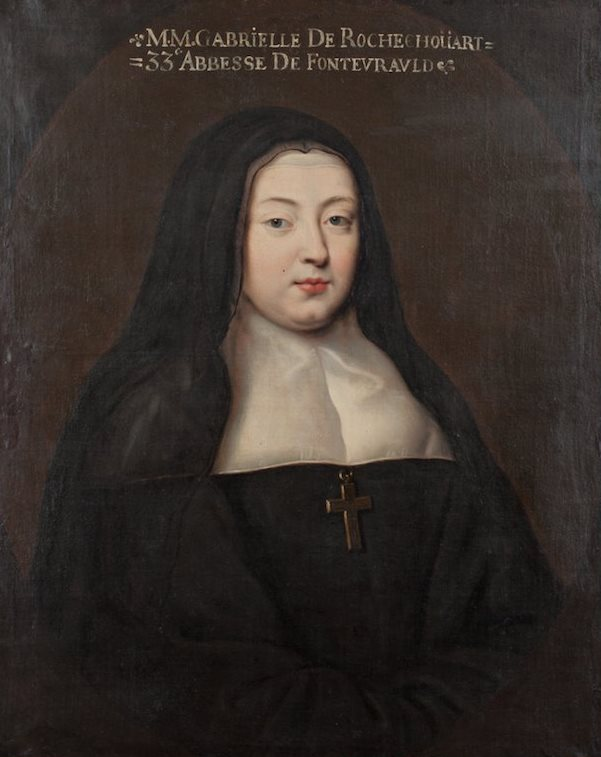
Gabrielle de Rochechouart, "queen of abbesses"

Marie-Madeleine Gabrielle Adélaïde de Rochechouart de Mortemart (1645 – 15 August 1704) was a French nun from the House of Rochechouart. The abbess of Fontevraud Abbey, she was an influential figure in the 17th century French intellectual community. She was the daughter of Gabriel de Rochechouart, duc de Mortemart, and thus sister to Madame de Montespan.

== Life ==
Gabrielle de Rochechouart was endowed with great beauty. In her childhood, she devoted herself to studying philosophy and languages, living and dead. Upon submitting to Maria Theresa of Spain, it was an astonishment to the new queen, unaccustomed as she was to hear a young person from the court speak languages other than French with ease. Introduced to various schools, who shared opinions, she turned to theology and doctrine of the Holy Fathers and Councils. In 1664, she joined the monastery of Abbaye-aux-Bois in 1664, in Poissy.

== Queen of abbesses ==
On 16 August 1670, Louis XIV appointed her Superior General of the Fontevraud Abbey, where she led the monks along with the nuns. Due to her relatively young age and other circumstances, this appointment required a Papal Dispensation. Along with the duties of Abbess, she continued her studies and turned Fontevraud into an intellectual and cultural centre. She also renovated the abbey palace and extended the land holdings. She translated the first three books of The Iliad of Homer, and with Racine, Plato's Symposium. She met the best writers of the day, asking for their opinions and advice. Under her administration, the order was thriving. Authority over the abbey, which was the mother-house of 50 dependent priories, earned her the title of queen of Abbesses, as reported by Saint-Simon, that

her spirit surpassed that of her sisters, and she joined them with a knowledge strong and extensive.

Victor Cousin says:

She had the spirit of Mortemart, and something of the beauty of her sisters, with the most noble traits and an air of majesty and mildness.

Louis XIV, with whom she corresponded regularly, tried to appoint her to the court, but she refused, preferring to remain in Fontevraud. After losing the King's favor due to her connection to the Affair of Poisons, Madame de Montespan had frequent stays in the abbey of her sister, as they remained close. Gabrielle de Rochechouart Mortemart died on 15 August 1704, leaving several pamphlets of various kinds. On hearing the news, Louis XIV pronounced during his dinner a thought for the great abbess.

He had preserved, wrote Saint-Simon, esteem and friendship which neither the expulsion of Madame de Montespan, or extreme for Madame de Maintenon could not dull.

She was replaced as head of the abbey by her niece, Louise-Françoise de Mortemart.

== Sources ==
- Général de Rochechouart, Histoire de la Maison de Rochechouart (Paris, 1859)
- Bouillet, Marie-Nicolas; Chassang, Alexis, eds. (1878). "Marie-Madeleine de Rochechouart" . Dictionnaire Bouillet (in French).
- Georges Martin, Histoire et généalogie de la Maison de Rochechouart (Mathias, 1990)
