= Béard =

- Commune
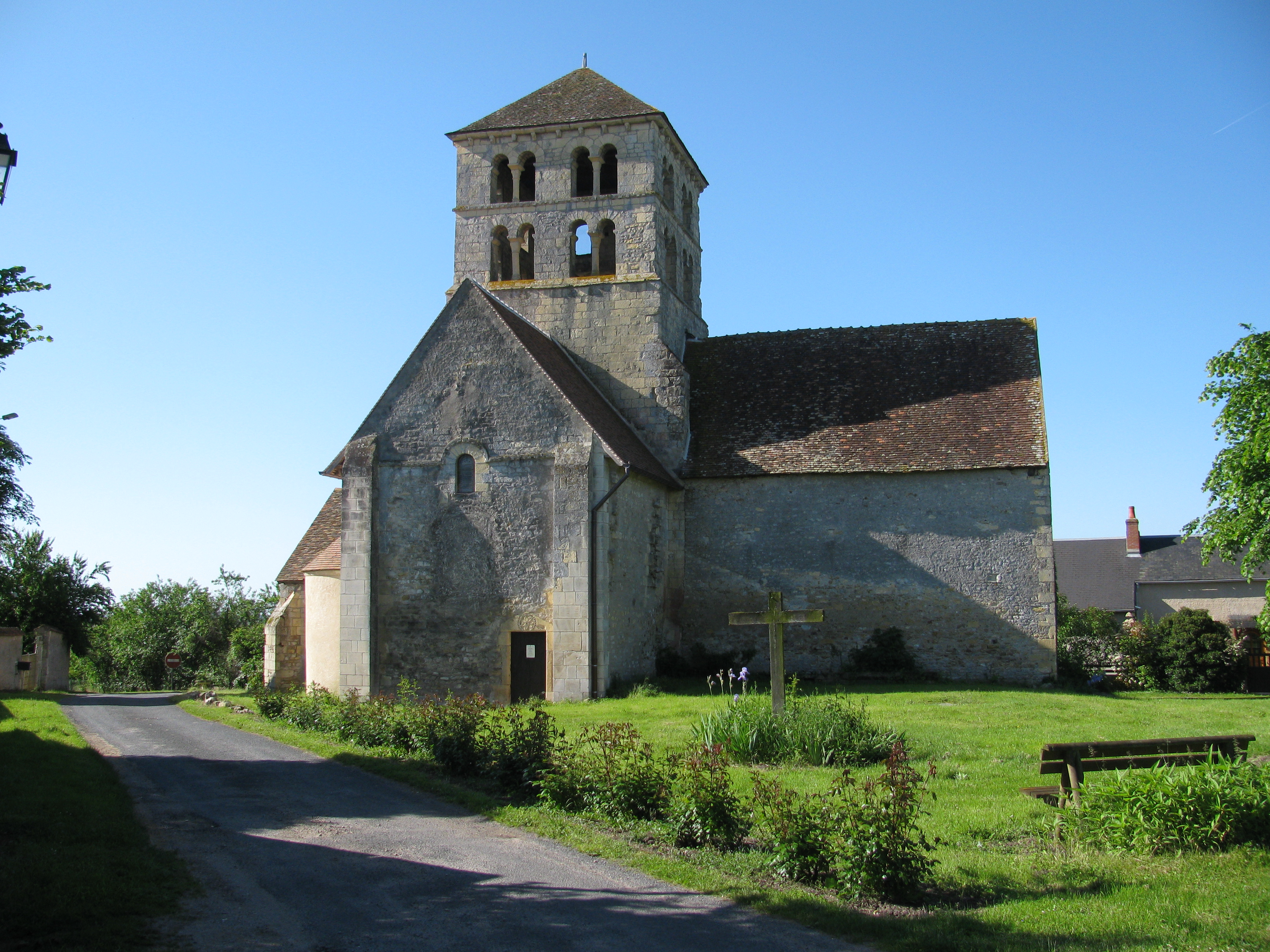
- The church of Saint-Laurent, in Béard
- Location of Béard
- Location within France Location within Bourgogne-Franche-Comté
- Coordinates: 46°51′48″N 3°19′42″E
- Country: France
- Region: Bourgogne-Franche-Comté
- Department: Nièvre
- Arrondissement: Nevers
- Canton: Imphy

Government
  - Mayor (2020–2026): Michel Vincent
- Area^{1}: 7.71 km^{2} (2.98 sq mi)
- Highest elevation: 252 m (827 ft)
- Lowest elevation: 177 m (581 ft)
- Population (2023): 160
  - Density: 21/km^{2} (54/sq mi)
- Time zone: UTC+01:00 (CET)
  - Summer (DST): UTC+02:00 (CEST)
- INSEE/Postal code: 58025 /58160
- ^{1} French Land Register data, which excludes lakes, ponds, glaciers > 1 km^{2} (0.386 sq mi or 247 acres) and river estuaries.

Béard (French pronunciation: [beaʁ]) is a commune in the Nièvre department in central France.

== Population ==
Historical population
Year	Pop.	±% p.a.
1968	165	—
1975	168	+0.26%
1982	149	−1.70%
1990	155	+0.49%
1999	174	+1.29%
2007	167	−0.51%
2012	162	−0.61%
2017	172	+1.21%
2023	160	−1.20%
Source: INSEE

== See also ==
- Communes of the Nièvre department
