= Trois-Vèvres =

- Commune
- Location of Trois-Vèvres
- Location within France Location within Bourgogne-Franche-Comté
- Coordinates: 46°54′47″N 3°25′11″E
- Country: France
- Region: Bourgogne-Franche-Comté
- Department: Nièvre
- Arrondissement: Nevers
- Canton: Imphy

Government
  - Mayor (2020–2026): Jacques Pouzet
- Area^{1}: 7.65 km^{2} (2.95 sq mi)
- Highest elevation: 296 m (971 ft)
- Lowest elevation: 222 m (728 ft)
- Population (2023): 241
  - Density: 31.5/km^{2} (81.6/sq mi)
- Time zone: UTC+01:00 (CET)
  - Summer (DST): UTC+02:00 (CEST)
- INSEE/Postal code: 58297 /58260
- ^{1} French Land Register data, which excludes lakes, ponds, glaciers > 1 km^{2} (0.386 sq mi or 247 acres) and river estuaries.

Trois-Vèvres (French pronunciation: [tʁwɑ vɛvʁ]) is a commune in the Nièvre department in central France.

== See also ==
- Communes of the Nièvre department
