= Gabriel de Rochechouart, 1st Duke of Mortemart =

17th Century Duke of Mortemart

Gabriel de Rochechouart
- 1st Duke of Mortemart
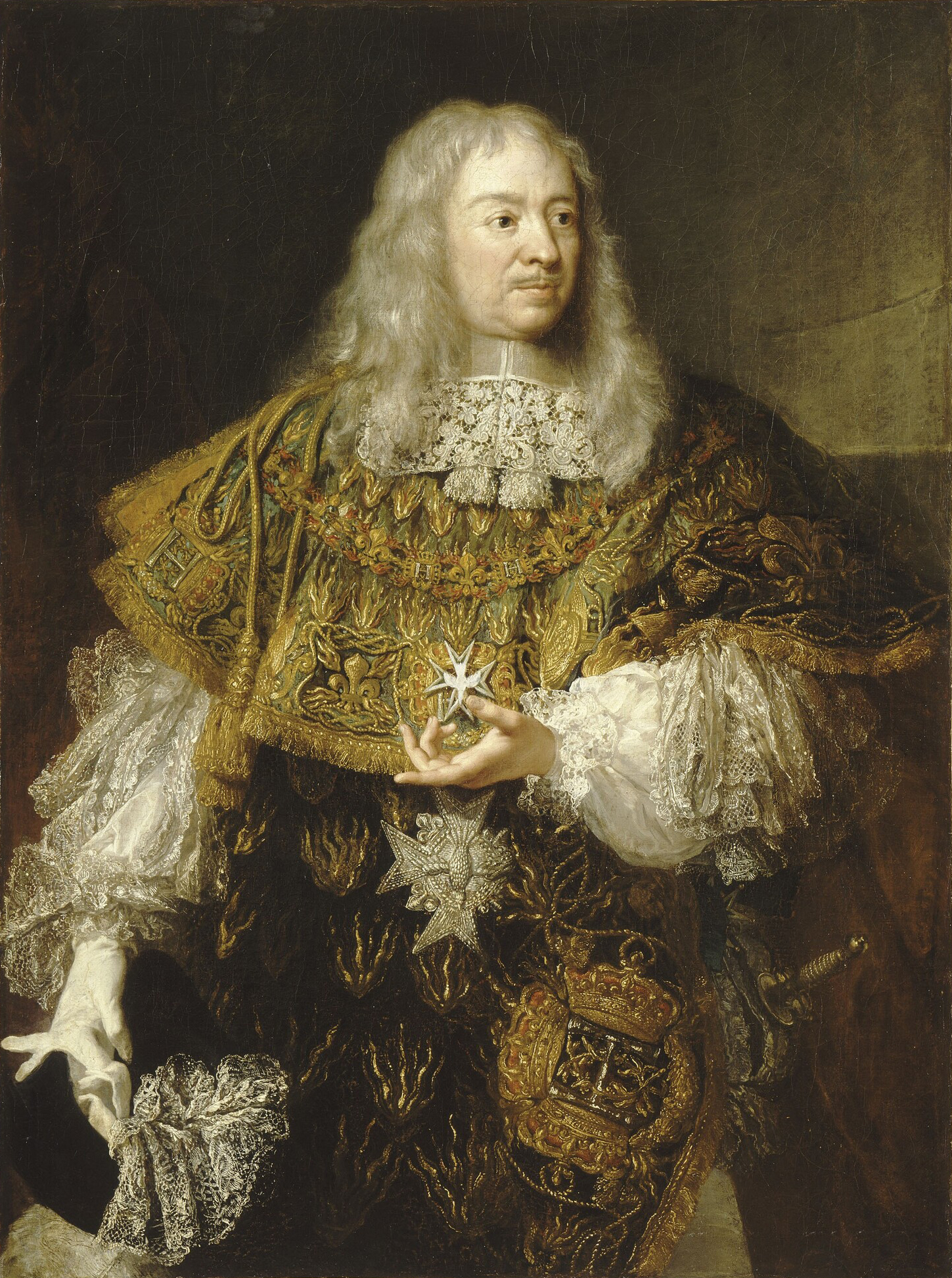
- Portrait of Gabriel de Rochechouart, 1st Duke of Mortemart wearing the Order of the Holy Spirit by an unknown artist.
- Born: 1600
- Died: 26 December 1675 (aged 74–75); Paris, France
- Noble family: Rochechouart
- Spouse: Diane de Grandseigne (m. 1632–1666)
- Issue Detail: Gabrielle, Marquise of Thianges; Louis Victor, 2nd Duke of Mortemart; Françoise, Marquise of Montespan; Marie Christine de Rochechouart; Marie Madeleine, Abbess of Fontevraud
- Father: Gaspard de Rochechouart, Marquis of Mortemart
- Mother: Louise de Maure

Gabriel de Rochechouart, 1st Duke of Mortemart (1600 – 26 December 1675) was a French nobleman and father of the Marquise de Montespan, mistress of King Louis XIV. He was a friend of Louis' father Louis XIII.

== Biography ==
Gabriel de Rochechouart was the son of Gaspard de Rochechouart, Marquis of Mortemart, and of Louise de Maure, suo jure Countess of Maure. His younger brother, Louis de Rochechouart de Mortemart, died without children in 1669.

He spent a great part of his childhood with the future Louis XIII, until the assassination of the latter's father, Henry IV, in 1610. In 1630, he was named the First Gentleman of the Chamber to Louis XIII, which entitled him to a pension of 6000 livres. He also maintained the confidence of the powerful Cardinal Richelieu and was an intimate of the Spanish-born queen, Anne of Austria.

He and his some of his descendants cultivated what became known as the esprit Mortemart, a particular type of wit which allowed impossible things to be said.

He was popular at the royal court, although his brother Louis and his cousin François de Rochechouart had been banished for their involvement in the Day of the Dupes in November 1630, when the enemies of Cardinal Richelieu mistakenly believed that they had succeeded in persuading Louis XIII to dismiss Richelieu from power.

In 1632, he married Diane de Grandseigne (1615 – 11 February 1666), the daughter of Jean de Grandseigne, Marquis de Marsillac, and of Catherine de La Béraudière, dame de Villenon.

A year after his marriage, he was created a Knight of the Orders of the King.

During his infancy, till he succeeded his father, he was known as the Marquis de Vivonne, a subsidiary title which was raised to a duchy in 1668.

When his father died in 1643, he took the title of Marquis de Mortemart.

On 23 December 1663, Louis XIV raised the Marquisate of Mortemart, to a duchy. The same day, Anne de Noailles became Duke of Noailles; the two families were united in 1723 when Gabriel's grandson, Louis Alexandre de Bourbon, Count of Toulouse, the son of Madame de Montespan, married a granddaughter of Anne, Marie Victoire de Noailles.

In 1669, he was named Governor of Paris.

Gabriel de Rochechouart de Mortemart died in Paris on 26 December 1675.

== Arms ==
Parti de trois et coupé de un, qui font huit quartiers: 1, de gueules au croissant de vair (Maure); 2, d'azur à trois fleurs de lys d;or au bâton de gueules (Bourbon); 3, de gueules a neuf mâcles d'or (Rohan); 4, burelé d'argent et d'azur à trois chevrons de gueules (La Rochefoucauld); 5, d'argent à la guivre d'azure engoulant un enfant au naturel (Milan); 6, de gueules aux chaînes posées en croix, sautoir et orle d'or (Navarre); 7, de gueules au pal de vair (des Cars); 8, d'hermine plain (Bretagne); sur le tout, fascé-ondé-enté d'argent et de gueules (Rochechouart).

== Issue ==
Name	Portrait	Lifespan	Notes
Louis Victor de Rochechouart; 2nd Duke of Mortemart		25 August 1636 - 15 December 1688	Born in Paris, he died at Chaillot; married and had 6 children; current descendants include the Dukes of Noailles;
Gabrielle de Rochechouart marquise of Thianges		1634- 12 September 1693	Married Claude Leonor Damas, Marquis of Thianges and had issue; her daughter Diane Gabrielle Damas de Thianges married Philippe Jules Mancini and had issue; current descendants include the Prince of Monaco through Prince Pierre, Duke of Valentinois, also a descendant of the duchesse de Polignac;
Françoise de Rochechouart; Athénaïs de Montespan; Madame de Montespan; Marquise of Montepsan		5 October 1641 – 27 May 1707	Born at the Château of Lussac-les-Châteaux, she married Louis Henri de Pardaillan de Gondrin and had issue; was King Louis XIV's maîtresse-en-titre and had issue including the future duc du Maine, Madame la Duchesse, Duchess of Orléans and Count of Toulouse;
Marie Christine de Rochechouart		?	Abbess. Little is known of her;
Marie Madeleine de Rochechouart; Abbess of Fontevrault		1645 - 15 August 1704	Never married, entered the Abbey of Fontevraud as a nun, where she eventually became the abbess; known as the Reine des abbesses; through her writings, she is known as Gabrielle de Rochechouart.
