= Druy-Parigny =

- Commune
- Location of Druy-Parigny
- Location within France Location within Bourgogne-Franche-Comté
- Coordinates: 46°52′10″N 3°22′02″E
- Country: France
- Region: Bourgogne-Franche-Comté
- Department: Nièvre
- Arrondissement: Nevers
- Canton: Imphy
- Intercommunality: Sud Nivernais

Government
  - Mayor (2020–2026): Pierre Thevenard
- Area^{1}: 25.12 km^{2} (9.70 sq mi)
- Highest elevation: 287 m (942 ft)
- Lowest elevation: 177 m (581 ft)
- Population (2023): 298
  - Density: 11.9/km^{2} (30.7/sq mi)
- Time zone: UTC+01:00 (CET)
  - Summer (DST): UTC+02:00 (CEST)
- INSEE/Postal code: 58105 /58160
- ^{1} French Land Register data, which excludes lakes, ponds, glaciers > 1 km^{2} (0.386 sq mi or 247 acres) and river estuaries.

Druy-Parigny is a commune in the Nièvre department in central France.

== See also ==
- Communes of the Nièvre department
