= Sauvigny-les-Bois =

- Commune
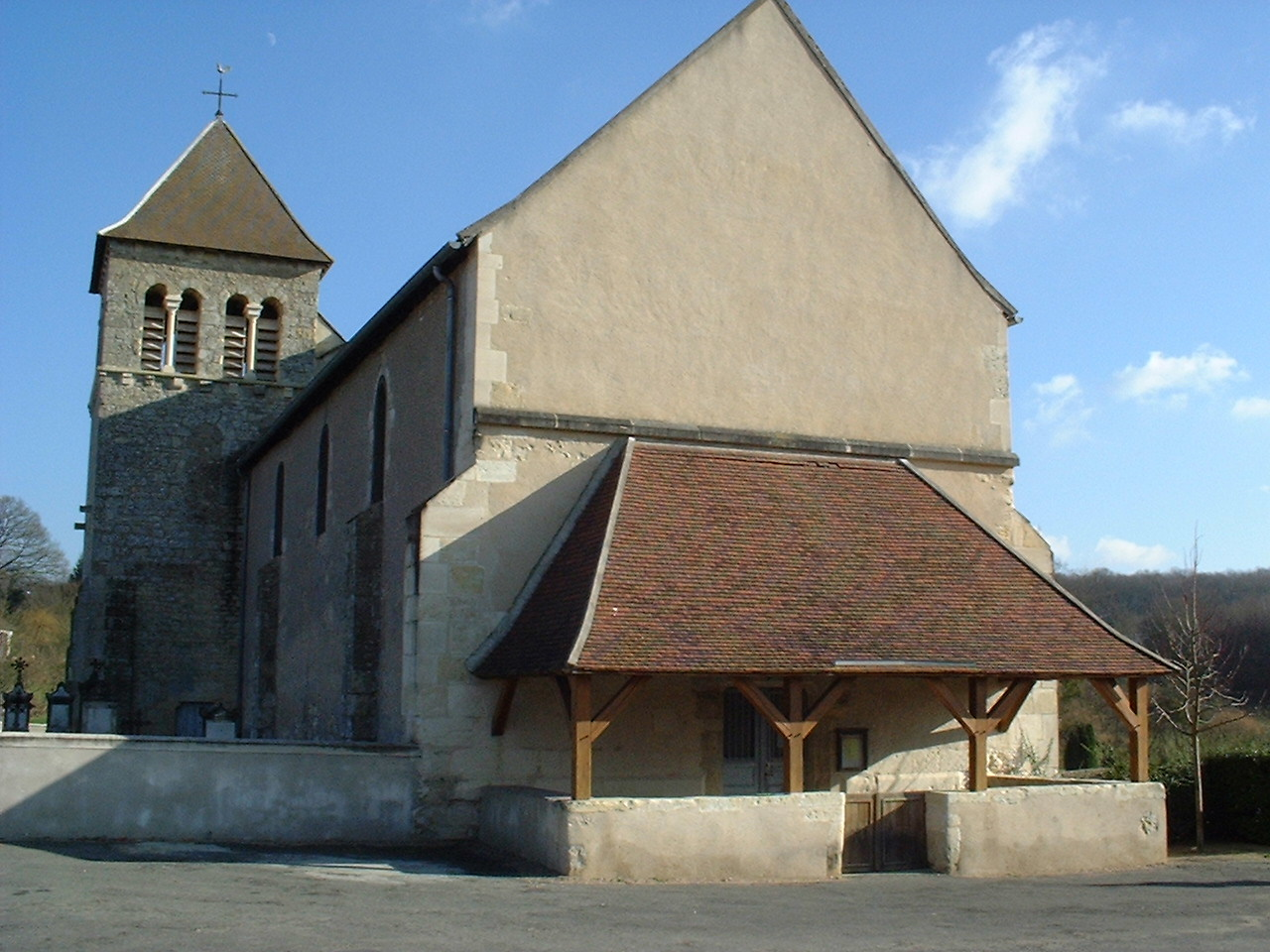
- The church in Sauvigny-les-Bois
- Location of Sauvigny-les-Bois
- Location within France Location within Bourgogne-Franche-Comté
- Coordinates: 46°58′10″N 3°16′24″E
- Country: France
- Region: Bourgogne-Franche-Comté
- Department: Nièvre
- Arrondissement: Nevers
- Canton: Imphy
- Intercommunality: Loire et Allier

Government
  - Mayor (2020–2026): Alain Lecour
- Area^{1}: 29.64 km^{2} (11.44 sq mi)
- Highest elevation: 297 m (974 ft)
- Lowest elevation: 172 m (564 ft)
- Population (2023): 1,409
  - Density: 47.54/km^{2} (123.1/sq mi)
- Time zone: UTC+01:00 (CET)
  - Summer (DST): UTC+02:00 (CEST)
- INSEE/Postal code: 58273 /58160
- ^{1} French Land Register data, which excludes lakes, ponds, glaciers > 1 km^{2} (0.386 sq mi or 247 acres) and river estuaries.

Sauvigny-les-Bois (French pronunciation: [soviɲi le bwa]) is a commune in the Nièvre department in central France. It is located on the junction of the main D18 road with the D209, 9 km south east of Nevers.

== See also ==
- Communes of the Nièvre department
