= Philippe Jules François Mancini, Duke of Nevers =

French aristocrat

Philippe Jules François Mancini
- Duke of Nevers
- Full name: Philippe Jules François Mancini
- Born: 1676; Paris, France
- Died: 1768 (aged 92); Paris, France
- Noble family: Mancini family
- Spouse: Marianna Spinola
- Issue: Louis Jules, Duke of Nevers
- Father: Philippe Jules Mancini
- Mother: Diane Gabrielle Damas

Philippe Jules François Mancini, 3rd Duke of Nevers (Paris, 1676 – Paris, 1768) was a French aristocrat and member of the Mancini family.

== Early life ==
He was born as the son of Philippe Jules Mancini, 8th Duke of Nevers and Diane Gabrielle Damas (1656-1715), he was the great-nephew of both King Louis XIV of France's mistress, Madame de Montespan, and his first chief minister, Cardinal Mazarin.

== Marriage and issue ==
In 1709 he married Maria Anna Spinola (1678–1718), daughter of Juan Bautista Spinola, Marchese of Vergagna and Marie Françoise du Bois. Their only child was the academician Louis Jules Mancini, the final Duke of Nevers.

== Titles ==
He could not inherit the title of Duke of Nevers from his father in 1707, because the duchy had not been properly registered at the Parlement of Paris. In 1709, he inherited the titles of prince of Vergagne, grandee of Spain and Prince of the Holy Roman Empire from his father-in-law. In 1720 he received letters of confirmation for the duchy of Nevers from the Parlement. In 1730, he abdicated as duke in his son's favour.
