= Saint-Ouen-sur-Loire =

- Commune
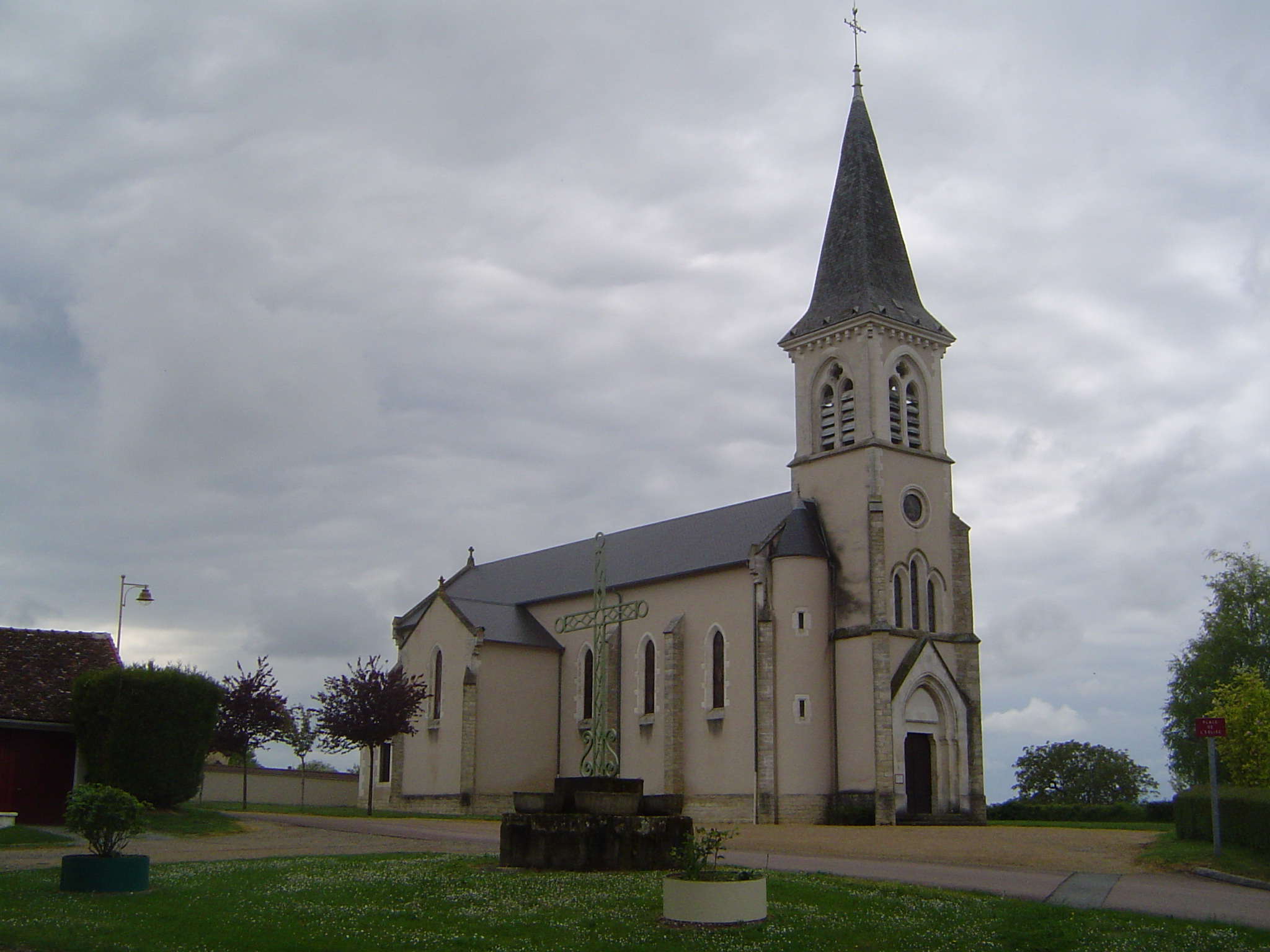
- The church in Saint-Ouen-sur-Loire
- Location of Saint-Ouen-sur-Loire
- Location within France Location within Bourgogne-Franche-Comté
- Coordinates: 46°53′32″N 3°18′12″E
- Country: France
- Region: Bourgogne-Franche-Comté
- Department: Nièvre
- Arrondissement: Nevers
- Canton: Imphy
- Intercommunality: Sud Nivernais

Government
  - Mayor (2020–2026): Pascale Simonnet
- Area^{1}: 23.71 km^{2} (9.15 sq mi)
- Highest elevation: 287 m (942 ft)
- Lowest elevation: 177 m (581 ft)
- Population (2023): 475
  - Density: 20.0/km^{2} (51.9/sq mi)
- Time zone: UTC+01:00 (CET)
  - Summer (DST): UTC+02:00 (CEST)
- INSEE/Postal code: 58258 /58160
- ^{1} French Land Register data, which excludes lakes, ponds, glaciers > 1 km^{2} (0.386 sq mi or 247 acres) and river estuaries.

Saint-Ouen-sur-Loire (French pronunciation: [sɛ̃.t‿wɛ̃ syʁ lwaʁ], literally Saint-Ouen on Loire) is a commune in the Nièvre department in central France. In 2021, the town had 507 inhabitants.

The commune's landmarks include a neo-gothical church from the early 20th century.

== See also ==
- Communes of the Nièvre department
