= Sougy-sur-Loire =

- Commune
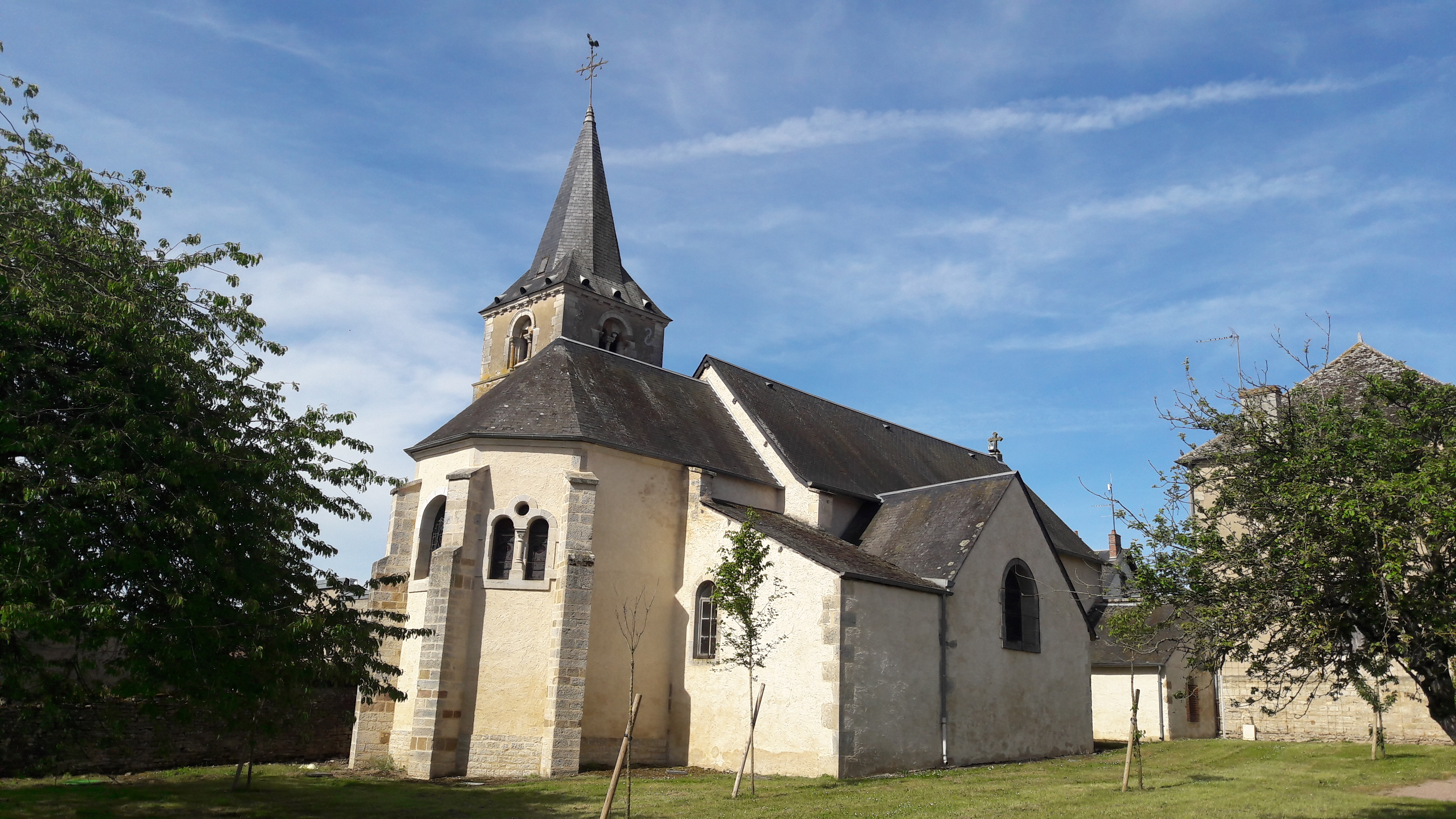
- Église Saint-Bénigne
- Location of Sougy-sur-Loire
- Location within France Location within Bourgogne-Franche-Comté
- Coordinates: 46°51′25″N 3°23′29″E
- Country: France
- Region: Bourgogne-Franche-Comté
- Department: Nièvre
- Arrondissement: Nevers
- Canton: Imphy
- Intercommunality: Sud Nivernais

Government
  - Mayor (2020–2026): François Gautheron
- Area^{1}: 32.92 km^{2} (12.71 sq mi)
- Highest elevation: 297 m (974 ft)
- Lowest elevation: 181 m (594 ft)
- Population (2023): 594
  - Density: 18.0/km^{2} (46.7/sq mi)
- Time zone: UTC+01:00 (CET)
  - Summer (DST): UTC+02:00 (CEST)
- INSEE/Postal code: 58280 /58300
- ^{1} French Land Register data, which excludes lakes, ponds, glaciers > 1 km^{2} (0.386 sq mi or 247 acres) and river estuaries.

Sougy-sur-Loire (French pronunciation: [suʒi syʁ lwaʁ], lit. 'Sougy-on-Loire') is a commune in the Nièvre department in central France.

== See also ==
- Communes of the Nièvre department
