= Liernais =

- Commune
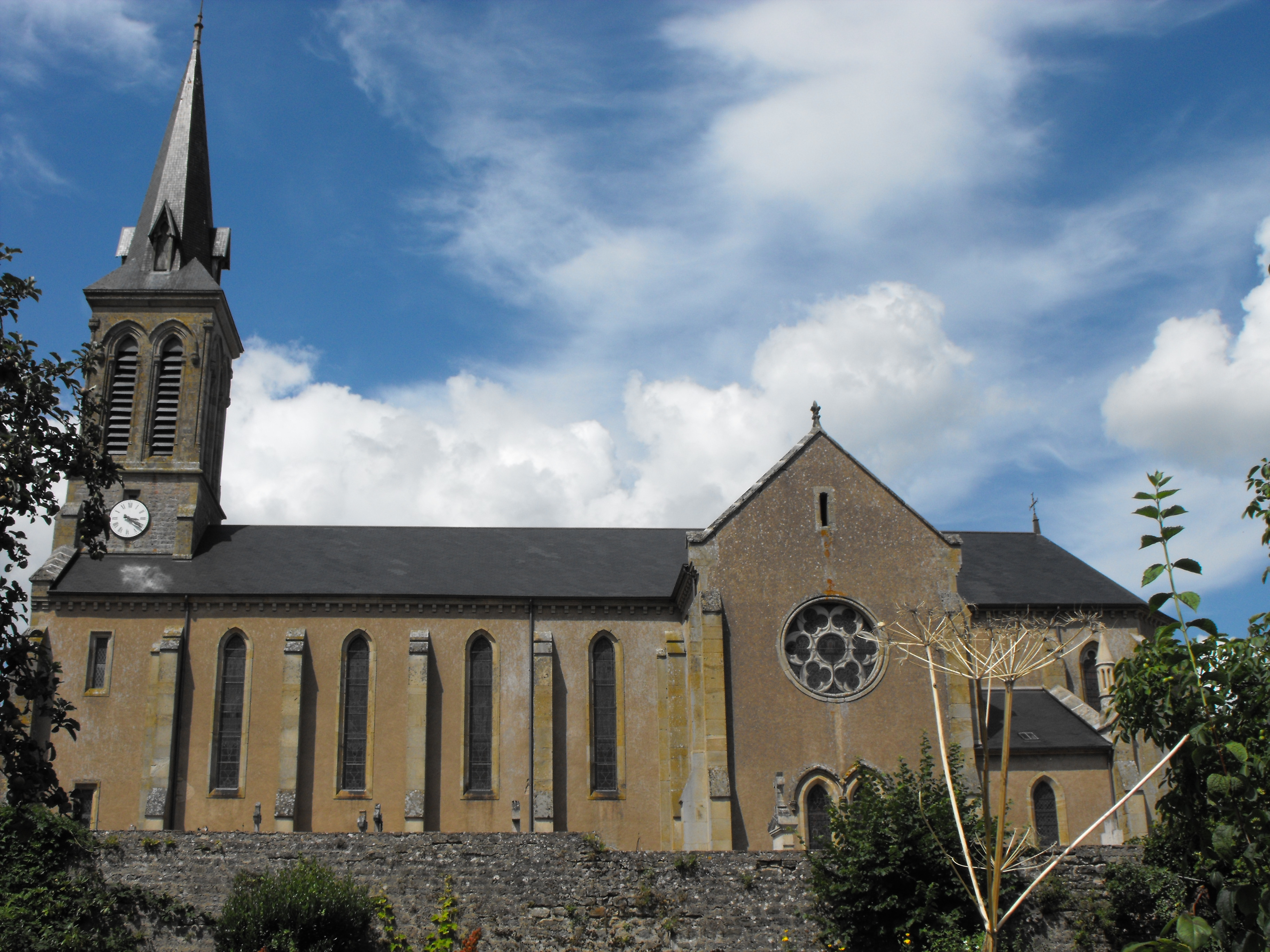
- The church in Liernais

- Coat of arms
- Location of Liernais
- Location within France Location within Bourgogne-Franche-Comté
- Coordinates: 47°12′27″N 4°16′59″E
- Country: France
- Region: Bourgogne-Franche-Comté
- Department: Côte-d'Or
- Arrondissement: Beaune
- Canton: Arnay-le-Duc
- Intercommunality: Pays Arnay Liernais

Government
  - Mayor (2022–2026): Quentin Guenot
- Area^{1}: 28.53 km^{2} (11.02 sq mi)
- Highest elevation: 543 m (1,781 ft)
- Lowest elevation: 424 m (1,391 ft)
- Population (2023): 482
  - Density: 16.9/km^{2} (43.8/sq mi)
- Time zone: UTC+01:00 (CET)
  - Summer (DST): UTC+02:00 (CEST)
- INSEE/Postal code: 21349 /21430
- ^{1} French Land Register data, which excludes lakes, ponds, glaciers > 1 km^{2} (0.386 sq mi or 247 acres) and river estuaries.

Liernais (French pronunciation: [ljɛʁnɛ]) is a commune in the Côte-d'Or department in eastern France. It was the geometric centre of the Eurozone between 2009, when Slovakia joined, and 2011, when Estonia joined.

== Population ==
Historical population
Year	Pop.	±% p.a.
1968	646	—
1975	616	−0.68%
1982	649	+0.75%
1990	628	−0.41%
1999	593	−0.64%
2007	539	−1.19%
2012	606	+2.37%
2017	514	−3.24%
2023	482	−1.07%
Source: INSEE

== See also ==
- Communes of the Côte-d'Or department
- Mancini family
- Parc naturel régional du Morvan
