= Canton of Imphy =

Coordinates: 46.94°N 3.26°E

The canton of Imphy is an administrative division of the Nièvre department in central France. Its borders were modified at the French canton reorganization that came into effect in March 2015. Its seat is in Imphy.

It consists of the following communes:

1. Béard
2. Druy-Parigny
3. Imphy
4. La Machine
5. Saint-Ouen-sur-Loire
6. Sauvigny-les-Bois
7. Sougy-sur-Loire
8. Thianges
9. Trois-Vèvres
