= Gabrielle de Rochechouart de Mortemart =

French noble (1633–1693)

- Marchioness of Thianges
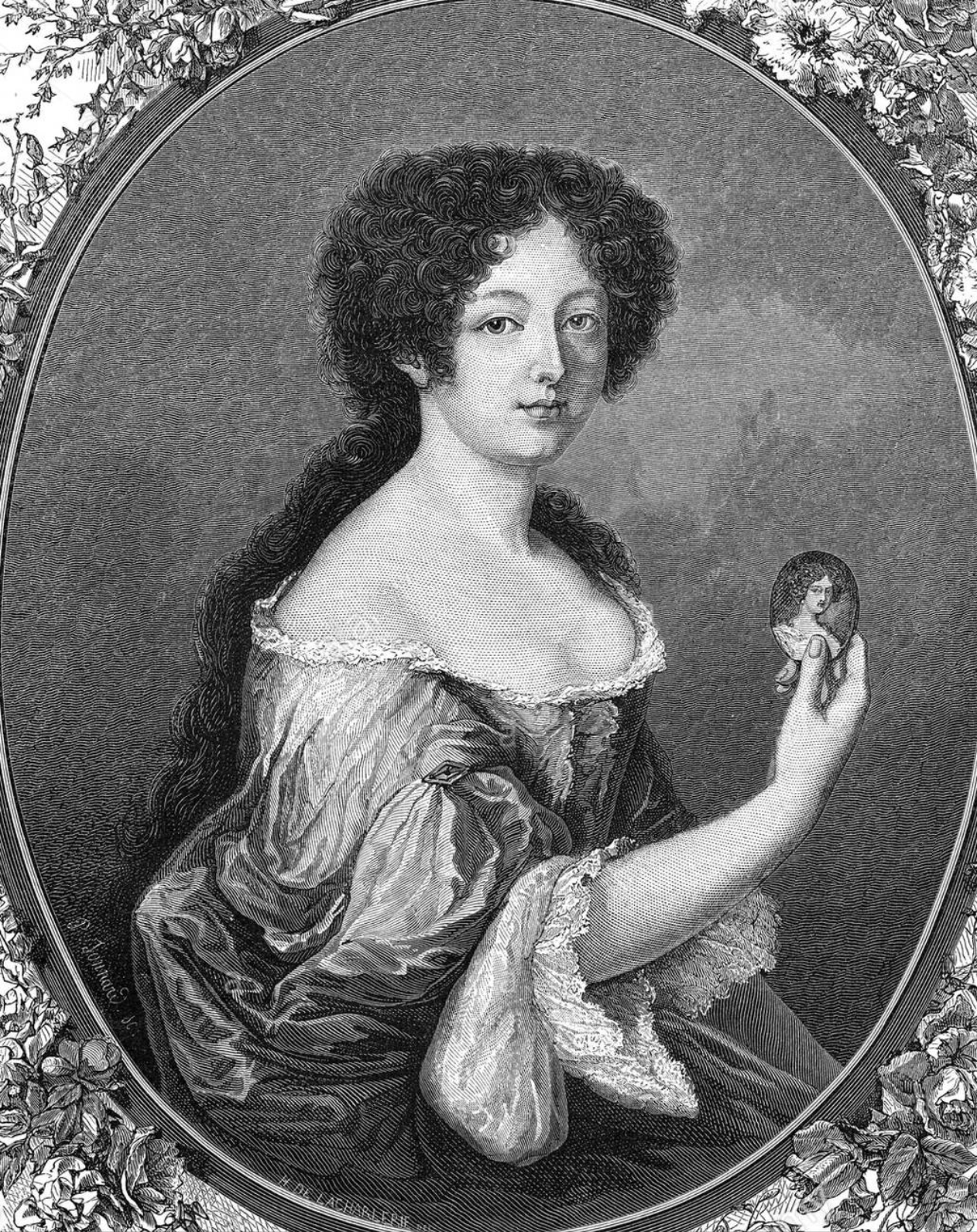
- Portrait by Paul Jonnard-Pacel
- Full name: Gabrielle de Rochechouart de Mortemart
- Born: 1633; Lussac-les-Châteaux, Poitou
- Died: 12 September 1693 (aged 59–60); Paris, France
- Noble family: Rochechouart
- Spouse: Claude Leonor Damas de Thianges
- Issue Detail: Claude Henri, Marquis of Thianges; Diane Gabrielle Damas; Louise Elvide, Duchess of Sforza
- Father: Gabriel de Rochechouart de Mortemart
- Mother: Diane de Grandseigne

Gabrielle de Rochechouart de Mortemart, Marchioness of Thianges (1633 – 12 September 1693) was a French noblewoman, known for her great beauty, wit, and skilled writings. She was the older sister of Françoise de Rochechouart de Mortemart, Madame de Montespan.

== Biography ==
Gabrielle de Rochechouart de Mortemart was born in 1633. She was the eldest child of Gabriel de Rochechouart de Mortemart and his wife; Diane de Grandseigne. She joined the court in 1651 during the Fronde. She originally was placed by her parents in the household of the young king Louis XIV. Later, she joined the household of his younger brother Philippe, duc d'Anjou. Gabrielle and the duc d'Anjou remained close friends for the rest of their lives, even after he succeeded to the duchy of Orléans and became known at court as the notoriously flamboyant homosexual Monsieur.

In 1655 she married Claude Leonor Damas de Thianges, Marquis of Thianges. The couple had four children, the third of whom married and had issue.

Although she may have been a mistress of Louis XIV, she never gained the power and influence over the king exercised by her younger sister, Madame de Montespan who became the king's maîtresse-en-titre in 1668. Gabrièlle was with her sister during the French military tour when Madame de Montespan became Louis XIV's mistress. She was also with the court when La Montespan gave birth to her daughter by Louis XIV, Mademoiselle de Nantes, at Tournai in June 1673.

Her daughter Diane married the homosexual Philippe Jules Mancini, duc de Nevers and nephew of Cardinal Mazarin. Through Diane, Gabrielle was the grandmother of Philippe Jules François Mancini and great-grandmother of Louis Jules Mancini Mazarini, the prominent French diplomat and writer. She was very close to her daughter, Diane, as well as to her sister, La Montespan.

She died in 1693, roughly 60 years of age.

She is also an ancestor of the present Prince of Monaco through Prince Pierre, Duke of Valentinois She was an ancestor of the husband of Marie Antoinette's favourite, the duchesse de Polignac.

She was also known for her writings, on subjects such as the nature of "politesse".

== Issue ==
- Diane Gabrielle Damas de Thianges, Duchess of Nevers (1656-12 January 1715) married Philippe Jules Mancini and had issue
- Claude Henri Philibert Damas de Thianges, Marquis of Thianges (1663-4 January 1708) married twice (1) Anne Claire de La Chapelle and had no issue; (2) married again to Anne Philippe de Harlay and had no issue;
- Louise Elvide Damas de Thianges Duchess of Sforza married Luigi Sforza-Conti, Duca di Ognano & Segni on 30 October 1678 had no issue;
- Gabrielle Damas de Thianges (?-c.1693) never married;

== Ancestry ==
Ancestors of Gabrielle de Rochechouart de Mortemart

8. René de Rochechouart, Lord of Mortemart
4. Gaspard de Rochechouart, Marquess of Mortemart
9. Jeanne de Saulx de Tavannes
2. Gabriel de Rochechouart de Mortemart, Duke of Mortemart
10. Charles de Maure, Count of Maure
5. Louise de Maure, Countess of Maure
11. Diane de Pérusse des Cars, Princess of Carency
1. Gabrielle de Rochechouart de Mortemart
12. Pierre de Grandseigne, Lord of La Flotte
6. Jean de Grandseigne, Marquess of Marsillac
13. Françoise Baillard
3. Diane de Grandseigne
14. François de La Béraudière, Lord of Villechèze
7. Catherine de La Béraudière
15. Anne Adrienne Frotier
