= Louis Jules Mancini, Duke of Nevers =

French diplomat and writer (1716–1798)

Louis Jules Mancini
- 4th Duke of Nevers
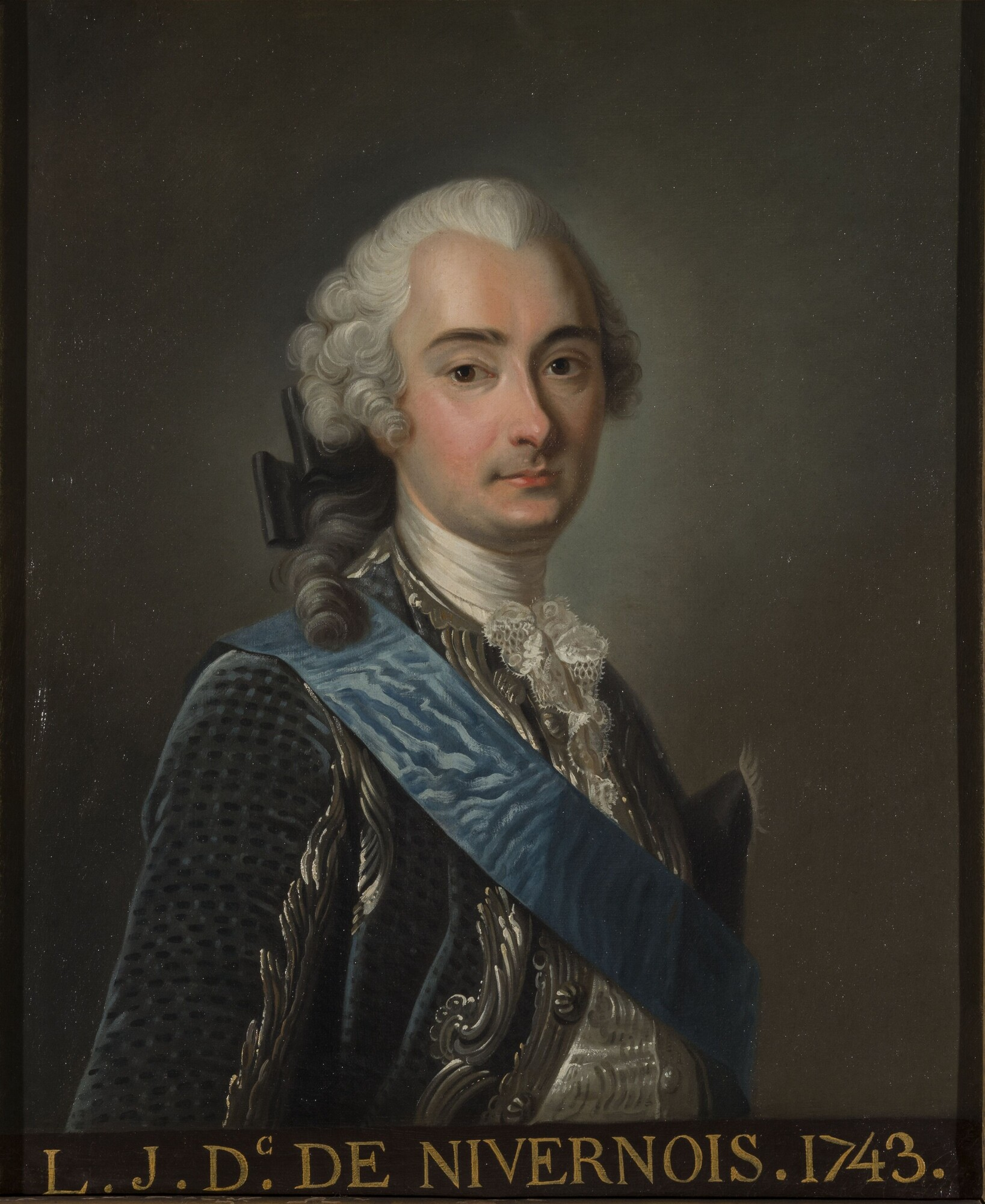
- Full name: Louis Jules Barbon Mancini
- Born: 16 December 1716; Paris, France
- Died: 25 February 1798 (aged 81); Paris, France
- Noble family: Mancini
- Spouses: Hélène Phélypeaux; Marie Thérèse de Brancas
- Issue: Hélène, Countess of Gisors; Adélaïde Diane, Duchess of Brissac
- Father: Philippe Jules François Mancini, 4th 3rd Duke of Nevers
- Mother: Marianna Spinola

Louis Jules Mancini, 4th (and last) Duke of Nevers (Louis Jules Barbon; 16 December 1716 – 25 February 1798) was a French diplomat and writer.

The Duke was the sixth member elected to occupy seat No. 4 of the Académie française in 1742. In England, he was styled Duke of Nivernois.

== Early life ==
Mancini was born in Paris, son of Philippe Jules François Mancini (the 3rd duke of Nevers from 1707 until his death in 1768), and his wife, Anna Maria Spinola, whom he married in 1709. His father, Philippe, was a great-nephew of Cardinal Mazarin and a great-grandson of the famous beauty Gabrièlle de Rochechouart de Mortemart, sister of Madame de Montespan.

Mancini was educated at Lycée Louis le Grand.

== Career ==
The Duke joined the French Army serving in the Italian campaigns (1733) and in Bohemia (1740); but, he had to give up soldiering on account of weak health. In 1738, he sold property including the Château de Druyes to Louis Damas, Marquis of Anlezy.

He was subsequently French Ambassador to Rome from 1748 to 1752, to Berlin from 1755 to 1756, and London, where he negotiated the Treaty of Paris, signed on 10 February 1763. From 1787 to 1789 he was a member of the Council of State. He chose not to emigrate during the Revolution, which led to the loss of all his money and he was imprisoned in 1793. He regained his liberty after the fall of Maximilien Robespierre, and died in Paris on 25 February 1798.

In 1743, the Duke was elected to the Académie française for a poem entitled Délie, and from 1763 he devoted the greater part of his time to the administration of his Burgundian estates in Nevers as well as to Belles-lettres. He wrote a great deal and with great facility; but his writings nowadays are generally considered to be of little value, his Fables being his best work. His Œuvres complètes were published in Paris in 1796; an edition of his Œuvres posthumes was brought out in Paris by Nicolas-Louis François de Neufchâteau in 1807, and his Correspondance secrète was published in Paris by De Lescure in 1866.

== Personal life ==
At the age of fourteen, he was married to Hélène Phélypeaux de Pontchartrain (1715–1781), daughter of Jérôme Phélypeaux, Count of Pontchartrain. Together, they were the parents of:

1. unnamed Mancini (1737–1737), who died at birth.
2. Princess Hélène Mancini (1740–1780), who married Louis Marie Foucquet de Belle-Isle, Count of Gisors (1732–1758), son of the Duke of Belle-Isle, himself son of Nicolas Fouquet who purchased Belle-Isle; married again to Camille, Prince of Marsan, brother of the Duchess of Bouillon without issue;
3. Princess Adélaïde Diane Mancini (1742–1808), who married Louis Hercule Timoléon de Cossé, Duke of Brissac.
4. Prince Jules Frédéric Mancini, styled Count of Nevers (1745–1753), who died in infancy.
5. Prince Louis Mancini (1748–1748), who died in infancy.

On 14 October 1782, he remarried Marie-Thérèse de Brancas. She was the daughter of Louis de Brancas, Marshal of France and Ambassador to Spain.

Styled Prince de Vergagne while heir to his father's titles, he was also a Prince of the Holy Roman Empire and a Knight of the Golden Fleece and of the Holy Spirit. The dukedom became extinct upon his death.

== See also ==
- Mancini family
- List of Ambassadors of France to the United Kingdom
