= Francesco Maria Mancini =

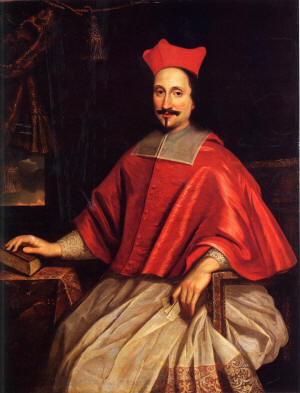
Francesco Maria Mancini

Francesco Maria Mancini (20 October 1606, Rome – 1672) was an Italian cardinal of the Mancini family. He was made a cardinal by Pope Alexander VII, in reward for contributing to Alexander's election as pope.

== Life ==
He was the son of Paolo, Signore Illustrissimo, and of the noblewoman Vittoria Capocci. Made a deacon of Santi Vito e Modesto, then a cardinal in 1660, holding the titulus of San Matteo in Merulana. His older brother, Baron Lorenzo Mancini, married Geronima Mazzarini, the sister of Cardinal Jules Mazarin, the chief minister to King Louis XIV. Upon Lorenzo's death in 1650, his widow took her family to France in the hope that her brother could arrange advantageous marriages for them. Lorenzo's five daughters became famous at the French court for their beauty and wit. They were known as the Mazarinettes. Later, one of his nieces, Marie, returned to Rome in 1661 and married Prince Lorenzo Colonna. She was followed by her sister, Hortense, in 1668. Hortense, who was fleeing her abusive husband, Charles de La Porte, duc de La Meilleraye, scandalized her uncle with her libertine ways.

== Sources ==
- This page is a translation of its Italian equivalent.
