= La Machine =

- Commune
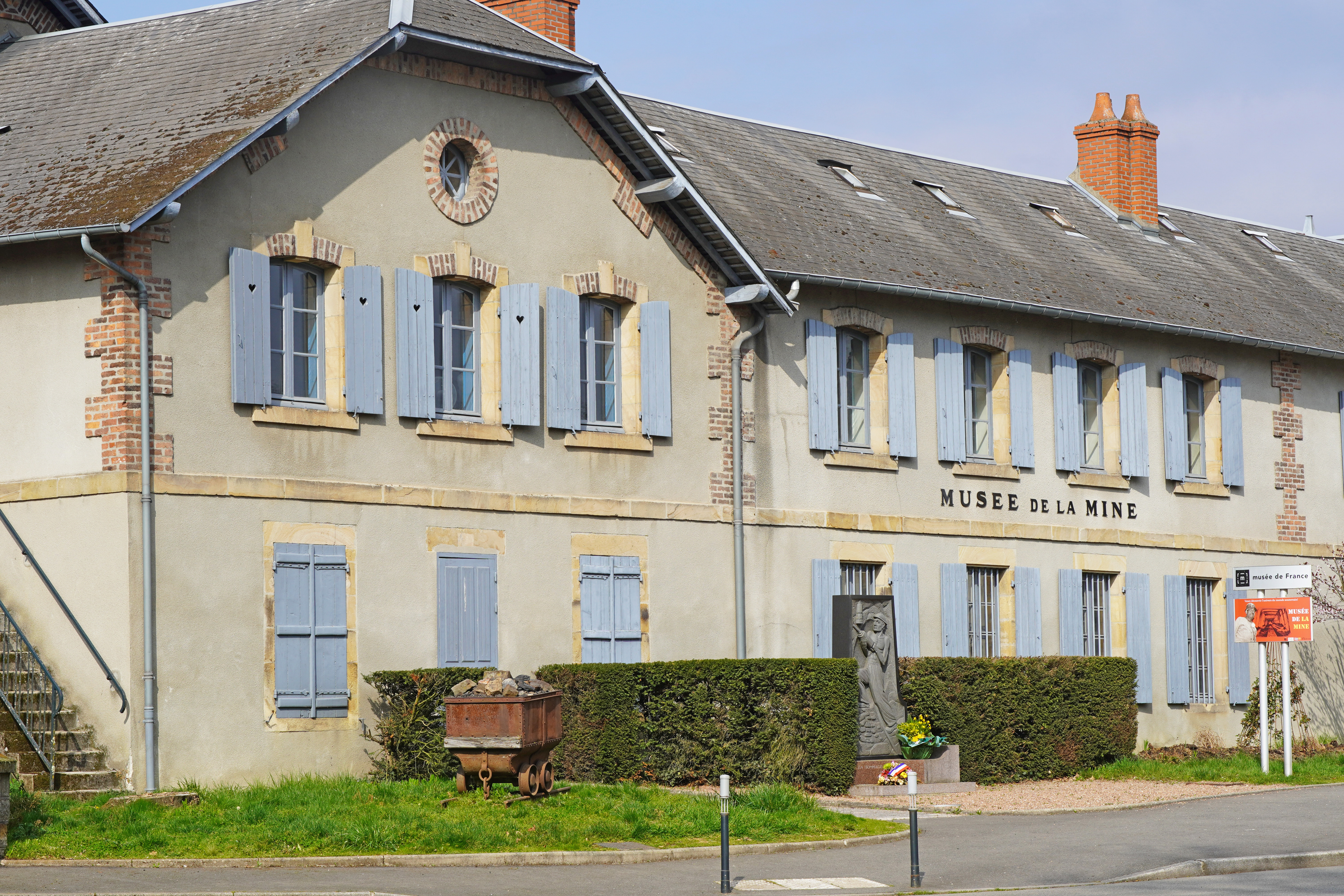
- Mine museum

- Coat of arms
- Location of La Machine
- Location within France Location within Bourgogne-Franche-Comté
- Coordinates: 46°53′24″N 3°28′01″E
- Country: France
- Region: Bourgogne-Franche-Comté
- Department: Nièvre
- Arrondissement: Nevers
- Canton: Imphy

Government
  - Mayor (2020–2026): Daniel Barbier
- Area^{1}: 17.95 km^{2} (6.93 sq mi)
- Highest elevation: 283 m (928 ft)
- Lowest elevation: 202 m (663 ft)
- Population (2023): 3,192
  - Density: 177.8/km^{2} (460.6/sq mi)
- Time zone: UTC+01:00 (CET)
  - Summer (DST): UTC+02:00 (CEST)
- INSEE/Postal code: 58151 /58260
- ^{1} French Land Register data, which excludes lakes, ponds, glaciers > 1 km^{2} (0.386 sq mi or 247 acres) and river estuaries.

La Machine (French pronunciation: [la maʃin]) is a commune in the Nièvre department in central France.

== Mining city ==
Mining marked its history. Coal was extracted beginning in the fifteenth century. The hamlet took the name of "La Machine" in reference to a machine which was used to extract the coal. Production stopped in 1974.

The coal mines attracted many workers and made the village and an economic engine for the region. From 1869 to 1946, the mines of La Machine, under the control of the Schneider Company, enjoyed a great prosperity and the development of the city accelerated. At the time of nationalization, the city had more than 6,000 inhabitants, with a quarter of them employed in the mine. Most are housed in housing estates built by the Company near the mines: Sainte-Marie (1856-1857), Sainte-Eudoxie (1878), Les Zagots (1917-1918) and Les Minimes (1922-1938).

Between 1917 and 1927, about 300 employees at the mines were Chinese. They were a part of the 140,000 Chinese that France and Britain had used to work in the back of the front during the First World War. Before their arrival in the village, some worked had already worked in the munitions factories also owned by the Schneider company. Only twenty stayed after the 1930s. They were to be followed by the Poles, Italians, Yugoslavs and North Africans. In 1936, 30% of the population of the village was of foreign origin.

The city reached its maximum population in the 1950s and became the fourth agglomeration of the department behind Nevers, Cosne-sur-Loire and Decize.

After a modernization of the mines and the centralization of coal mining at the mines of Les Minimes, La Machine had to cease trading because of the coal crisis in France. In the final years, coal was intended only for local businesses when it was still more or less profitable due to the low cost of transportation. Nevertheless, the last miner came up in 1975 after three centuries of coal mining.

== Demographics ==
Historical population
Year	Pop.	±% p.a.
1968	5,749	—
1975	4,999	−1.98%
1982	4,627	−1.10%
1990	4,192	−1.23%
1999	3,735	−1.27%
2007	3,556	−0.61%
2012	3,472	−0.48%
2017	3,343	−0.75%
2023	3,192	−0.77%
Source: INSEE

== See also ==
- Communes of the Nièvre department
