= Abbaye-aux-Bois =

Former abbey in Paris, France

Coordinates: 48.8522°N 2.3276°E

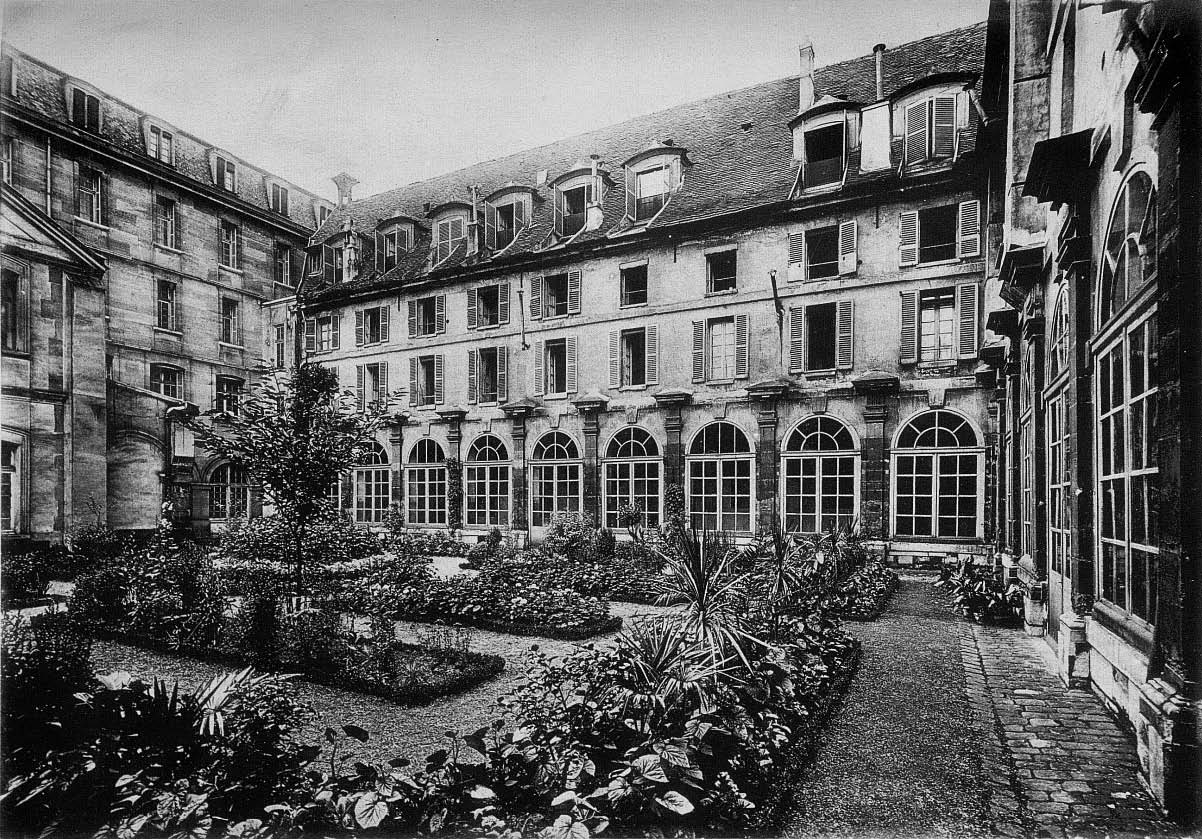
The courtyard garden at Abbaye-aux-Bois. (1905)

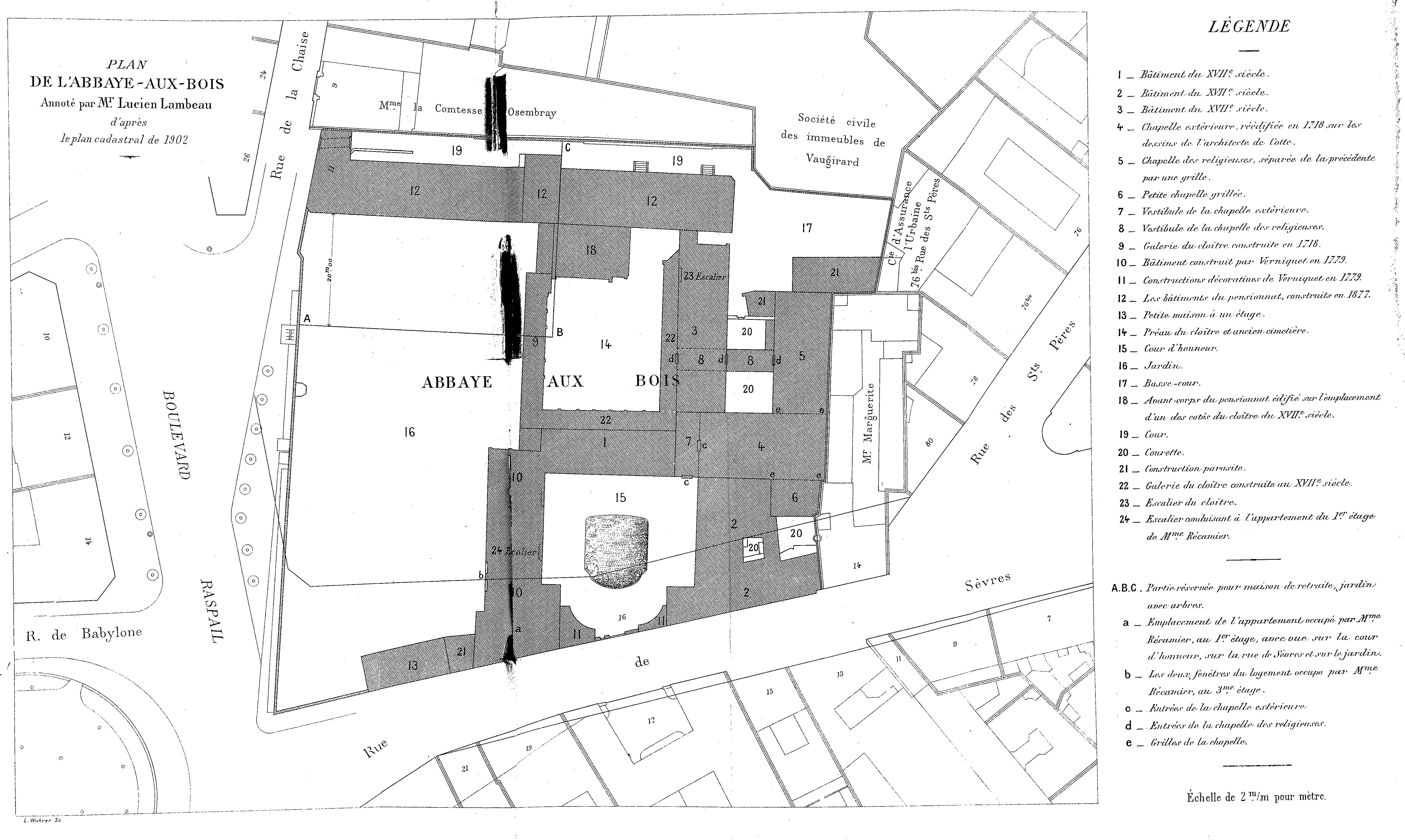
1905 architectural plan of Abbaye-aux-Bois, archived by the Municipal Commission of Old Paris.

The Abbey of the Woods (French: Abbaye-aux-Bois) was a Bernardine (i.e., Cistercian) convent in Paris, with buildings at 16 rue de Sèvres and at 11 rue de la Chaise in the 7th arrondissement. The buildings used by the convent were repurposed several times before their destruction in 1907.

== History ==
The abbey was founded in Ognolles in the Diocese of Noyon by Jean II, Lord of Nesle, in 1202, before his departure for the Fourth Crusade. The abbey was at that time named Notre-Dame-aux-Bois ("Our Lady of the Woods"). It was probably Cistercian since its foundation.

With support from French nobility and the local bourgeoisie, the convent grew rapidly. For generations it was protected by popes and kings; in the 14th century, a shift in the Hundred Years' War obliged the nuns to relocate. When later wars threatened the convent, it moved several times before settling in Paris in 1654. There, Anne of Austria installed the nuns in their new site: buildings formerly tenanted by the Sisters of the Annunciation of Mary. The convent adopted its present name in 1667. In 1718, the nuns rebuilt the church under the invocation of Notre-Dame and of Saint Anthony. It is for these nuns that Marc-Antoine Charpentier composed his Leçons de ténèbres in 1680. Wealthy, aristocratic families paid up to 400 livres a year for their daughters to be educated at the convent.

=== The abbey changes hands ===
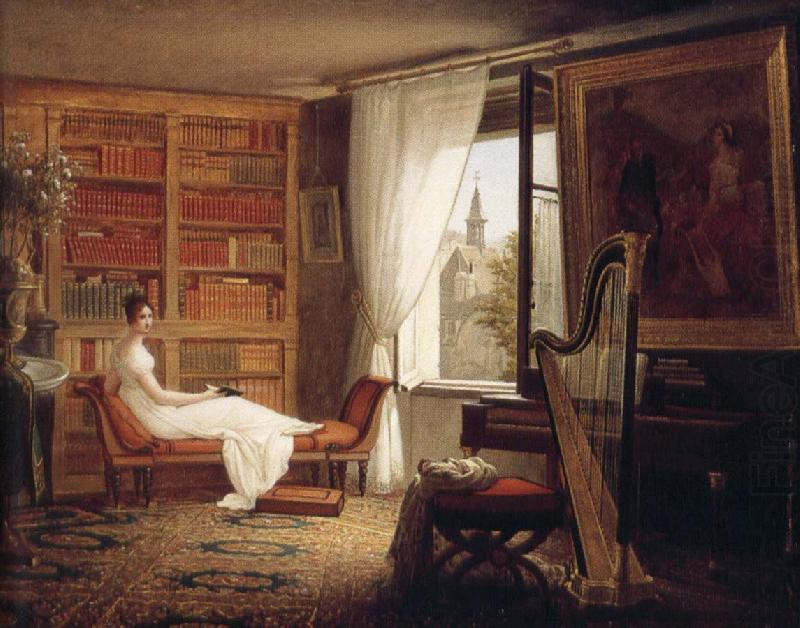
François-Louis Dejuinne's 1826 rendering of Juliette Récamier in her fourth-floor chambers at Abbaye-aux-Bois.

The convent's buildings were expropriated in 1792. As national property (biens nationaux), they became a prison during the Reign of Terror, and then were sold for private residence. Only the church was preserved, annexed to the parish of Saint Thomas Aquinas in 1802. In 1831 it was the site of the requiem (funeral Mass) for Father Henri Grégoire. A royal decree of 18 November 1827 permitted a religious order called the Chanoinesses de Saint-Augustin de la Congrégation Notre-Dame ("Saint Augustine's Canons of the Congregation of Our Lady") to use the buildings of the rue de Sèvres. They tutored students, and sublet rooms in one part of the abbey to ladies of high society.

One wing of the abbey was converted to a nursing home. There, socialite Juliette Récamier, affected by a reversal of fortune, lived for 30 years—from 1819 until her death in 1849 at age 71. She first occupied a small, two-room apartment on the fourth floor before moving to a larger first-floor unit (where she could entertain guests) in 1829. This had been sub-let to Mary Clarke and her mother and they had entertained there. In this larger space, she and François-René de Chateaubriand hosted a salon that became one of the largest in the world of European literature. It bolstered the recognition of a number of the young writers who attended, including Alphonse de Lamartine, Charles Augustin Sainte-Beuve, and Honoré de Balzac.

Chateaubriand, Récamier's friend and former landlord, described his first visit to her fourth-floor quarters in his autobiography, Mémoires d'Outre-Tombe:

A dark corridor connected two little rooms; I maintained that this hallway was lit by a gentle light. The bedroom was furnished with a bookcase, a harp, a piano, a portrait of Madame de Staël, and a view of Coppet by moonlight. On the window sills were pots of flowers. When, breathless after climbing three flights of stairs, I entered this little cell as dusk was falling, I was entranced. The windows looked out over the Abbaye garden, around the green enclosure of which the nuns made circuits, and in which the schoolgirls ran about. The summit of an acacia tree reached to eye-level and the hills of Sèvres could be seen on the horizon. The setting sun gilded the picture and entered through the open windows. Madame Récamier would be at the piano; the Angelus would toll; the notes of the bell, which seemed to mourn the dying day: ‘il giorno pianger che si more’, mingled with the final accents of the invocation to the night from Steibelt’s Romeo and Juliet. A few birds would come and settle on the raised window-blinds. I would merge with the distant silence and solitude, above the noise and tumult of a great city.

— François-René de Chateaubriand, book 29, chapter 1: "Madame Récamier", section 4. Translated by A. S. Kline.

Antoinette Henriette Clémence Robert's brief stay at the abbey in 1845 also occurred during this period. Clémence Robert, a writer then in her late forties, had recently published two books.

=== The end of the abbey ===
In 1904, French legislation outlawed religious education such as that conducted at abbeys. What remained of Abbaye-aux-Bois was destroyed in 1907 during the expansion of the rue de Sèvres. Parts of the abbey site were later converted to a new street (rue Récamier); the site of the nursing home became Roger Stéphane Square.

Parisian novelist Joris-Karl Huysmans, too, died in 1907. In an article he wrote about the abbey's impending destruction, he summarizes its history and reminisces nostalgically about a nun he once heard singing the Kyrie eleison a cappella in the chapel there. He contrasts the starkness of her lone, echoing voice with the crowds and activity of Paris near the end of the Belle Époque. Huysmans felt a personal significance in the demolition of the abbey. He was born in Paris and lived there for most of his life. He rejected the Church at a young age, but in middle age he retired from the Ministry of the Interior and became a novice at Ligugé Abbey. When new association laws dispersed the monks in 1902, Huysmans returned to Paris. Five years later, he sentimentalized the loss of the familiar Abbaye-aux-Bois.

In 1919, the Théâtre Récamier was erected on the site of the chapel on rue Récamier. Actor/director Jean Vilar and the Renaud-Barrault Company took up residence there after they were expelled from the Odéon-Théâtre de l'Europe in May 1968; they stayed until 1975. In 1978, public performances at the theatre ceased and it became a rehearsal venue for the Comédie-Française. It shut in 2008 for renovation.

== See also ==
- List of Cistercian monasteries in France
