= Mancini family =

Family of Roman nobility

Coat of arms of the Mancini family

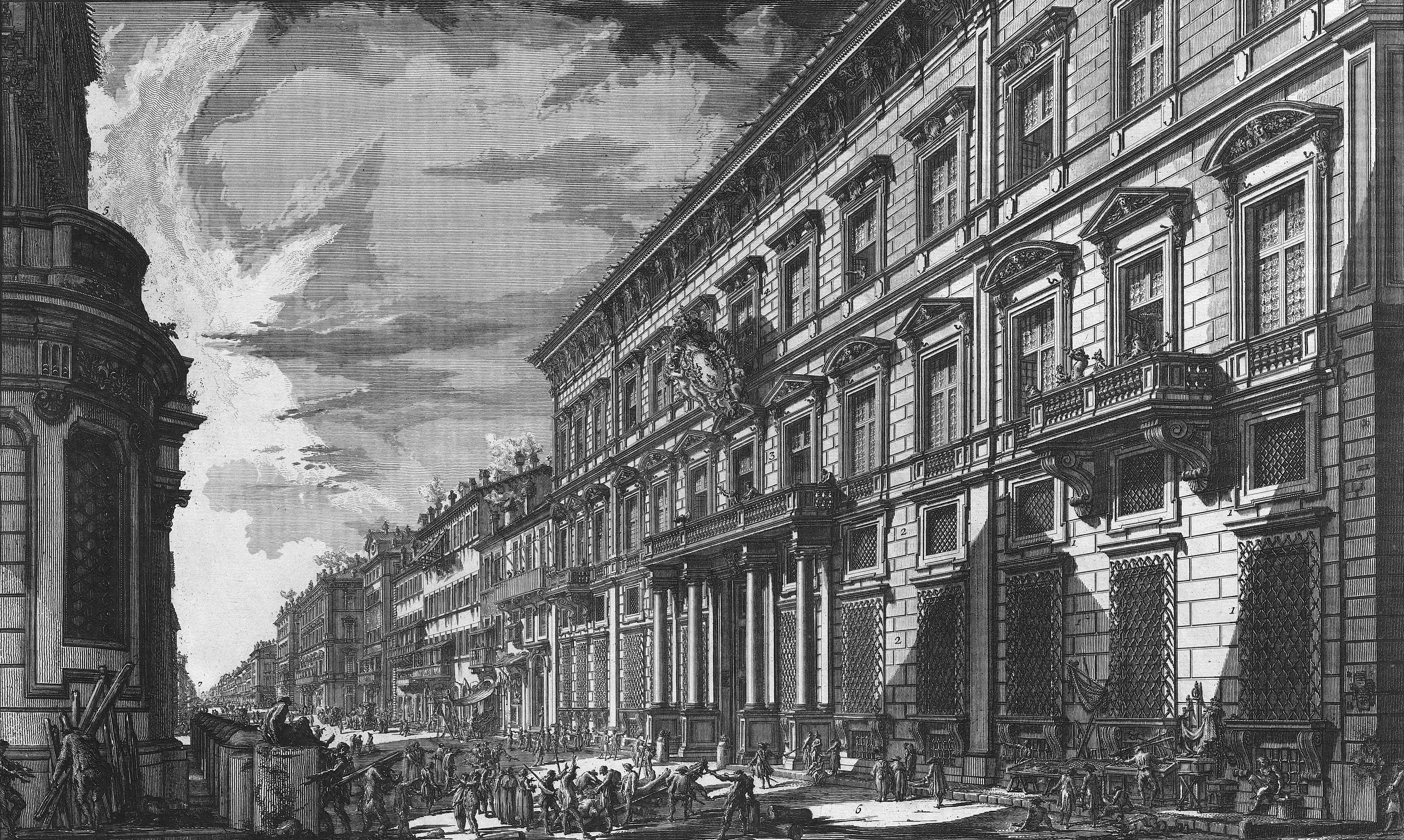
Palazzo Mancini, Rome. Etching by Giovanni Battista Piranesi, 1752.

The House of Mancini was the name of one of the oldest families of Roman nobility. Their titles and fiefs were numerous: Duke of Nevers and Donzy, Prince of Vergagne and of the Holy Roman Empire with the style of Serene Highness, French Peer, Spanish Grandee, Marquis of Fusignano, Count of Montefortino, Viscount of Clamecy, Baron of Tardello, Tumminii and Ogliastro, Lord of Claye-Souilly, Roman noble and Venetian patrician. They were knights of the Order of the Golden Fleece, of the Order of the Holy Spirit, of the Order of Saint Michael, of the Sovereign Order of Saint John of Jerusalem and many more. The humanist Marco Antonio Altieri (1457–1537) includes them in Li Nuptiali, an important collection of news about Rome in the 16th century. The family was granted the Honneurs de la Cour of France.

== Origins ==
Of Roman origin, the family has a thousand-year roots in Italy, and traditionally asserts a line of descent from the gens Hostilia, whose line took the surname Mancinus, all the way back to Lucius Hostilius Mancinus, who was consul in 145 BC and a commander of the Roman fleet during the Third Punic War.

== History ==
The coat of arms of the House of Mancini de Lucij

The coat of arms of the House of Mancini-Mazarini

=== Naples line ===
The Naples line was descended from Domenico Nicola Mancini who was nominated Marquis of Fusignano by the Prince Francesco of Este, son of the Duke Alfonso of Este, and he moved to the Kingdom of Naples in 1527; Domenico Nicola III, 5th Marquis of Fusignano gained the title of Count Mancini in 1745 by the Pope Benedict XIV; it had as most important member the Count Pasquale Stanislao Mancini (1817–1888), 8th Marquis of Fusignano, illustrious jurist, writer and three times Minister of The Kingdom of Italy (public education, justice and foreign affairs).

Various lines derive from the Naples line, among which the noble Federico Mancini (London 1951), Aldo Mancini (Foggia 1938), Count of Montefortino and knight of the Sovereign Order of Saint John of Jerusalem, and of the Teutonic Order, and the son Giorgio Mancini (Rome 1974), and the San Vittore line (from the hamlet of San Vittore del Lazio where the family got wide terrains and properties) founded by the Count Antonio Mancini in 1800 with his representative Count Adriano Fulvio Mario Mancini (Rome 1952) and the son Count Federico Adriano Mario La Longa Mancini (Rome 1979).

=== Mancini of Rome ===
The Mancini family was called de Lucij (or simply Lucij) in Rome for the fish on its coat of arms. Many of the members were "Conservatori all'Urbe". The first known member of the family is Lucio Mancini, who lived in 990. In the centuries, the family had various lines that thrived with nobility everywhere, particularly at Fermo, where the first memories go back to 1160, giving to the city Priori, Consoli, Gonfalonieri and Dottori, but the most important are the Sicily line and the Nevers line.

==== Sicily line ====
The Sicily line: a) was descended from Giacomo Mancini, who moved to Sicily in 1256 to escape Vitelleschi's persecutions; the Barons of Tardello, Tumminii and Ogliastro were descended from him. This line was extinguished in the 17th century. b) was descended from Francesco Mancini, consanguineous of the Cardinal Giulio Mazzarino, who moved to Catania in the 17th century as Attorney-General of the Prince Marco Antonio Colonna and his wife Isabella Gioeni. Mancini family flourished in Catania in the following centuries, so that the Town-Council dedicated streets and squares to Mancini's family. At present, the surname of the family is Mancini de Lucij.

==== Nevers Line ====
The Nevers Line was illustrated by many eminent people:

- A. Paolo (1580–1637), founder of the "Accademia degli Umoristi", which was attended by such literary men as Giovanni Battista Guarini, Gian Battista Marino and Alessandro Tassoni; he was the father of:
  - 1. Lorenzo (1602–1650), Roman baron, necromancer and astrologer, married Girolama Mazzarini, Cardinal Mazarin's sister. After his death, his widow took their children to Paris in the hope of using her famous brother's influence to gain advantageous marriages for them, a goal which was quite successful. Lorenzo was the father of:
    - a. Laura Mancini (1636–1657), who married Louis de Bourbon, duc de Vendôme and became the mother of the famous French general Louis Joseph de Bourbon, duc de Vendôme,
    - b. Olympia Mancini (1638–1708), who married Eugène-Maurice of Savoy-Carignano and became the mother of the famous Austrian general Prince Eugene of Savoy,
    - c. Marie Mancini (1639–1715), who married Lorenzo Colonna and was the first romantic love of King Louis XIV,
    - d. Philippe Mancini (1641–1707), nominated Duke of Nevers and Donzy by his uncle, Cardinal Mazarin, with the prerogative to strike coins, in 1660. He was a knight of the Order of the Holy Spirit and Lieutenant of the First Company of Musketeers of the King; his successor in the charge was the Count D'Artagnan; he was the grandfather of:
        - i. Louis-Jules Mancini-Mazarini, Duc de Nivernais (1716–1798), Prince of Vergagne and Prince of the Holy Roman Empire, and knight of the Order of the Golden Fleece and of the Order of the Holy Spirit, general, diplomat and writer.
    - e. Hortense Mancini (1646–1699), the beauty of the family, who escaped her abusive husband, Armand-Charles de la Porte, duc de La Meilleraye, and went to London, where she became the mistress of King Charles II.
    - f. Marie Anne Mancini (1649–1714), who married Maurice Godefroy de la Tour d'Auvergne, duc de Bouillon, a nephew of the famous field marshal Turenne, and patroness of Racine and La Fontaine;
  - 2. Cardinal Francesco Maria Mancini (1606–1672), who was important in the election of the Pope Alexander VII.

The family coat of arms inspired the heraldry of the French commune of Liernais.

=== San Vittore line ===
Collateral line of the illustrious and old Mancini family, subline of the Naples line, initiated in the 19th century by Count Antonio Filippo Luigi (1824–1890), first lieutenant of the Neapolitan Army. The son Giuseppe Alessandro Luigi (1852–1903), Belle-Epoque dandy, married donna Maria Antonietta Marinelli (1862–1911), daughter of the noble Vittorio Leonardo of the marquesses Marinelli, in 1882; they had seven children along which Carlo Alberto Antonio (1883–1940), horse owner who married a noblewoman of german descent, Maria Concetta Cassone Simeoni-Wrbna, patrician of Benevento (1886–1965) in 1911.

They had Antonio Eugenio Andrea (1915–1990), officer of the Italian Army, he was aide-de-camp of Marshal Rodolfo Graziani in 1938, and during the Second World War fought in the VIII Army Corps on the Greek-Albanian battlefront; in 1943 he was caught by the Germans in Yugoslavia and he was confined at Hohenstein in Saxony, but he escaped; then he got the Military Cross.

In 1951, he married noble Giulia de Dominicis (1930–1988), daughter of the noble Michele Alfonso de Dominicis (1907–1960), Commander of the Order of Merit of the Republic. His son Count Adriano Fulvio Mario Mancini (1952) is an Arabian horse breeder and entrepreneur in the advertising industry, member of the Società Genealogica Italiana, Commander of the Sovereign Order of Saint John of Jerusalem.

== Notable buildings ==
- Mancini Palace in Rome
- Mancini de Lucij Palace also in Rome

== Sources ==
- T. Amayden, La Storia delle Famiglie Romane ( con note ed aggiunte di C. A. Bertini ), Roma 1907
- Giovan Battista di Crollalanza, Dizionario storico-blasonico delle famiglie nobili e notabili italiane estinte e fiorenti, vol. II, ed. A. Forni, Bologna 1886-1890
- Claudio Rendina, Le Grandi Famiglie di Roma, Newton & Compton Editori, 2004
- De la Chenaye-Desbois,Dictionnaire de la Noblesse seconde edition Tome 9, Paris 1775, p. 468,469,672,673
- Pompilio Dottore, Mariano Bocchini, "I Conti Mancini di San Vittore", Delta3 Edizioni, 2020
- Pompilio Dottore, "Il Casato Mancini", Delta3 Edizioni, 2022
- Pompilio Dottore, "I Mancini e il Castello di San Vittore (Album fotografico)", Delta3 Edizioni, 2024
- Giuseppe TricoliLa Deputazione degli Stati e la crisi del Baronaggio Siciliano Fondazione Culturale <<Lauro Chiazzese>> della Cassa di Risparmio V.E. per le Province Siciliane, Palermo 1966, p. 299
- Mariano Foti Ognina, storia ricerche impressioni, Edizioni Chiesa-Mondo, Catania 1996, p. 191-194
