= Philippe Jules Mancini, Duke of Nevers =

Italian noble

Philippe Jules Mancini
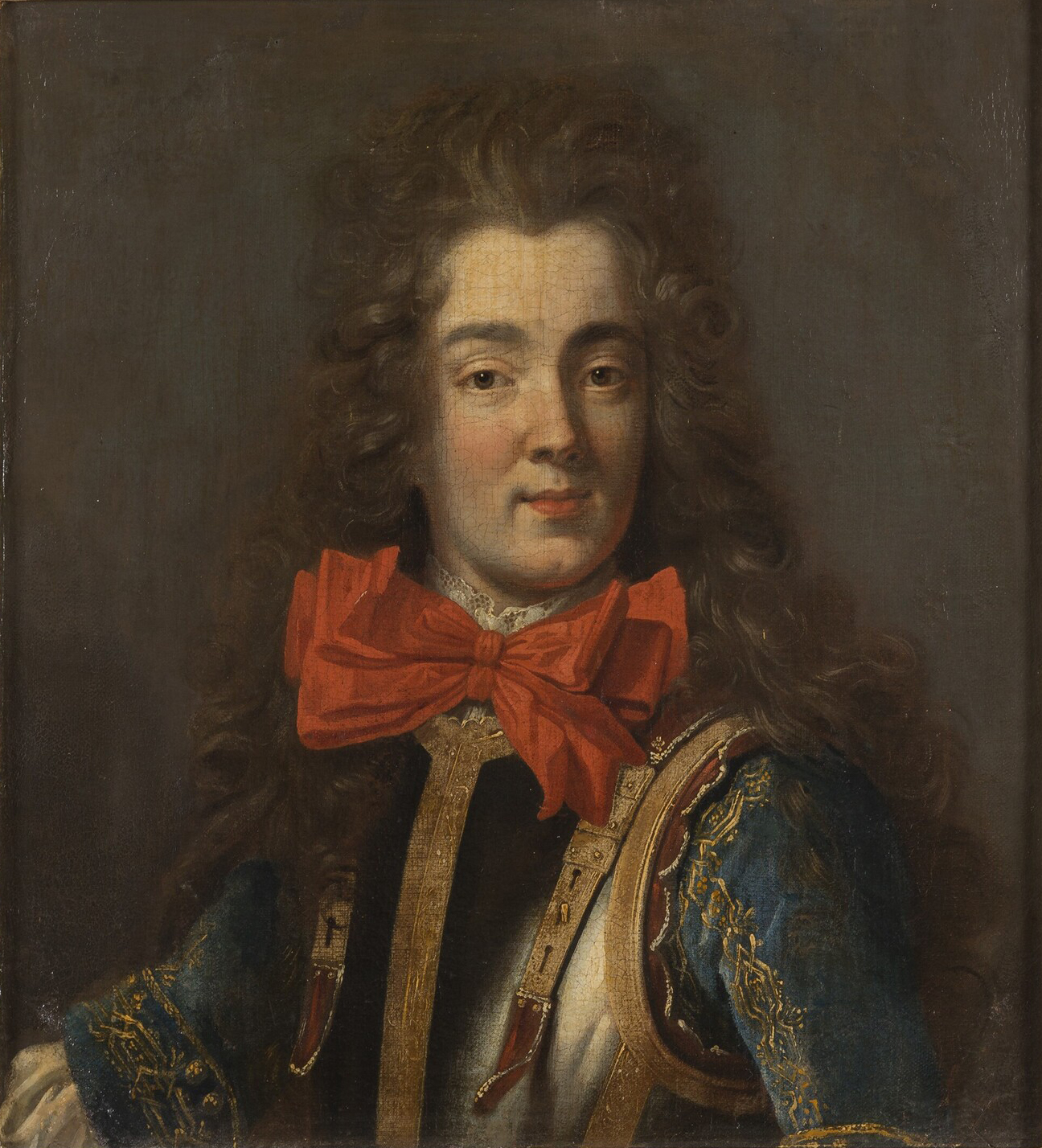

Duke of Nevers
- Coat of arms
- Tenure: 1661 – 1707
- Predecessor: Cardinal Mazarin
- Successor: Philippe Jules François
- Born: May 26, 1641; Rome, Papal States
- Died: May 8, 1707 (aged 65); Paris, France
- Noble family: House of Mancini
- Spouse: Diane-Gabrielle de Damas de Thianges
- Issue: Diane Gabrielle; Philippe Jules; Diane Adélaïde; Jacques Hippolyte
- Father: Lorenzo Mancini
- Mother: Girolama Mazzarini

4th Captain of the King's Musketeers
- In office 1657–1667
- Monarch: Louis XIV
- Chief Minister: Cardinal Mazarin; Jean-Baptiste Colbert
- Secretary of State of the Maison du Roi (Note: Under the authority of Maison militaire du roi de France): Henri de Guénégaud
- Secretary of State for War: Michel Le Tellier
- Preceded by: Comte de Troisville (1634); Position abolished
- Succeeded by: D'Artagnan

Personal details
- Relatives: Cardinal Mazarin (uncle)

Philippe Jules Mancini, 8th Duke of Nevers (1641–1707) was the nephew of Cardinal Mazarin, chief minister of France immediately after the death of King Louis XIII. He was the brother of the five famous Mancini sisters, who, along with two of their female Martinozzi cousins, were known at the court of King Louis XIV as the Mazarinettes.

== Family ==
Philippe was born in Rome in 1641. He was the son of Baron Lorenzo Mancini, an Italian aristocrat who was also a necromancer and astrologer. After his father's death in 1650, his mother, Geronima, brought her family from Rome to Paris in the hope of using the influence of her brother, Cardinal Mazarin, to gain them advantageous marriages. Philippe's five famous sisters were:

- Laure (1636–1657), who married Louis de Bourbon, duc de Vendôme and became the mother of the famous French general Louis Joseph, Duke of Vendôme,
- Olympe (1638–1708), who married Eugene Maurice, Count of Soissons and became the mother of the famous Austrian general Prince Eugene of Savoy,
- Marie (1639–1715), who married Lorenzo Colonna and was the first romantic love of King Louis XIV,
- Hortense (1646–1699), the beauty of the family, who escaped her abusive husband, Armand Charles de La Porte, 2nd Duke of La Meilleraye, and went to London, where she became the mistress of King Charles II.
- Marie Anne (1649–1714), who married Maurice Godefroy de la Tour d'Auvergne, duc de Bouillon, a nephew of the famous field marshal Turenne.

Philippe's cousins, the Martinozzis, also moved to France at the same time, for the same goal (to marry well). The elder, Laura, married Alfonso IV d'Este, duke of Modena and became the mother of Mary of Modena, second wife of James II of England. The younger, Anne Marie Martinozzi, married Armand de Bourbon, prince de Conti.

He also had two brothers: Paul and Alphonse.

== Early life ==
Soon after his arrival in France, his uncle, Cardinal Mazarin, decided to use him as a tool to avert future warfare in the kingdom. Upon the death of King Louis XIII in 1643, the older of his two sons succeeded to the throne of France as King Louis XIV. In order to discourage the type of tempestuous relationship that had developed between Louis XIII and his younger brother Gaston, the young king's mother, Anne of Austria, and chief minister, Cardinal Mazarin, decided to protect the future king by making sure that his younger brother, the duc d'Anjou, had no part in any political or military office. During his youth, Anjou's behavior was closely watched by dowager queen and her advisor, who made sure that the young duke had no meaningful financial freedom from the Crown. His income was to be derived solely from his appanage.

The queen and Mazarin discouraged the duc d'Anjou from traditional manly pursuits such as arms and politics, and encouraged him to wear dresses, makeup, and to enjoy feminine behaviour. His inclination toward homosexuality was not discouraged, with the hope of reducing any threat he may have posed to his older brother. Reportedly, Cardinal Mazarin even commanded his nephew, Philippe, to de-flower the king's younger brother.

In 1657, Cardinal Mazarin re-established the Mousquetaires du Roi, a military unit later immortalized by Alexandre Dumas in his story of The Three Musketeers. Philippe was awarded the position of leader of the corps as a captain-lieutenant. In 1661, after the Cardinal's death, jurisdiction over the musketeers passed to Louis XIV. He replaced Philippe in 1667 with Charles de Batz-Castelmore, comte d'Artagnan. The comte had been in actual control of the unit since joining in 1658, as Philippe was not interested in war and rarely accompanied the musketeers in battle.

As a young man, Philippe frequented the salon of Paul Scarron. Scarron's young wife, the future Madame de Maintenon, became friends with Philippe's sister Marie Mancini. In 1660, Philippe was nominated to be duc de Nevers and Donzy by his uncle, Cardinal Mazarin, with the prerogative to strike coins. The Parlement of Paris, however, refused to register this new creation. Another creation in 1676 was no more successful. In 1661, Philippe inherited part of his uncle's colossal wealth, the majority of which went to his younger sister, Hortense, who was their uncle's favourite.

In 1668, Philippe helped Hortense escape her abusive husband by procuring horses and an escort to help her travel to Rome, where she took refuge with their sister, Marie, now the Princess Colonna.

He was a knight of the Order of the Holy Spirit.

== Marriage and children ==
In 1670 he married Diane Gabrielle Damas de Thianges (1656–1715), daughter of Gabrielle de Rochechouart de Mortemart and niece of Louis XIV's mistress, Madame de Montespan. They had six children, including:

- Diane Gabrielle Victoire Mancini (1672–1716), who married Charles Louis Antoine de Hénin-Liénard, prince de Chimay
- Philippe Jules François Mancini (1676–1769), prince de Vergagne et du Saint Empire, then duke of Nevers
- Diane Adélaïde Philippe Mancini (1687–1747), who married Louis-Armand, duc d'Estrées
- Jacques Hippolyte Mancini (1690–1759), who in 1719 married Anne-Louise de Noailles (daughter of Anne Jules de Noailles), with their only child being Marie Diane Zéphirine (1726–1755), who married Louis-Héracle de Polignac. They are ancestors of Albert II of Monaco through their grandson, Jules François Armand de Polignac.
