= Natchez =

Natchez may refer to:

== Peoples and cultures ==
- Natchez people, a historical Native American tribe, namesake of the Mississippi city

- Natchez language, the language of the Natchez people

== Places ==
- Natchez, Alabama, United States
- Natchez, Indiana, United States
- Natchez, Louisiana, United States
- Natchez, Mississippi, a city in southwestern Mississippi, United States
  - Natchez slave market, Mississippi, United States
- Grand Village of the Natchez, a Plaquemine cultural site in Adams County, Mississippi
- Natchez Trace, a historic trail from Natchez, Mississippi to Nashville, Tennessee
- Natchez Trace Parkway, a United States National Parkway
- Natchez Bluffs and Under-the-Hill Historic District

== Arts, entertainment, and media ==
- Les Natchez, a novel by French author François-René de Chateaubriand
- The Natchez, an 1834–35 painting by Eugène Delacroix
- Natchez (film), a 2025 American documentary film about Natchez, Mississippi
- Natchez (Playhouse 90), an American television play

== Ships ==
- Natchez (boat), several vessels of the same name
- USS Natchez, three U.S. Navy ships of the same name

== Other uses ==
- 1840 Natchez tornado which hit Natchez, Mississippi
- Natchez (horse), American racehorse
- Natchez revolt, 1729 attack on French colonists

== See also ==
- Naches (disambiguation)
- Naiche, also known as Natchez, the son of Cochise and last hereditary ruler of the Chiricahua Apaches
