= Pierre-Simon Ballanche =

French writer and counterrevolutionary philosopher

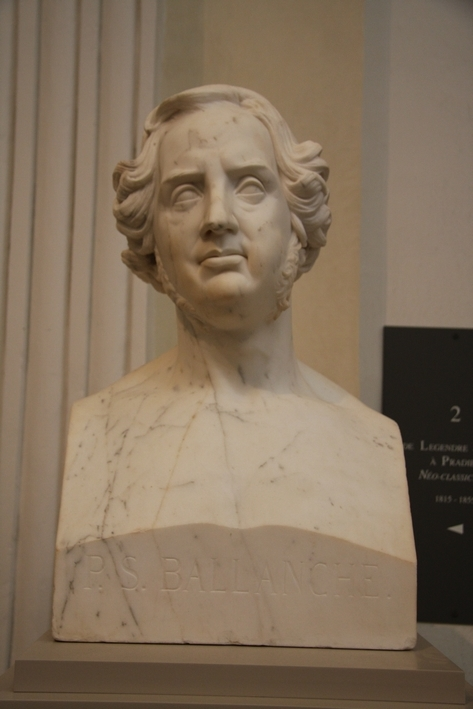
Buste de Pierre-Simon Ballanche par Jean-Marie Bonnassieux, musée des Beaux-Arts de Lyon

Pierre-Simon Ballanche (4 August 1776 – 12 June 1847) was a French writer and counterrevolutionary philosopher, who elaborated a theology of progress that possessed considerable influence in French literary circles in the beginning of the nineteenth century. He was the ninth member elected to occupy seat 4 of the Académie française in 1842.

== Life and career ==
=== Early years ===
Born in Lyon, Ballanche was seventeen when his imagination was marked for life by the horrors of the French Revolution. In 1793, the city's royalist revolt against the authority of the revolutionary Convention ended with guillotining or summary execution of about 700 people. This, and an unhappy love affair early in life, left him with an abidingly tragic view of life as sanctified suffering, a view that he embodied in his works, of which the best known was an unfinished multi-part work entitled Essais de palingénésie sociale ("Essays on Social Palingenesis"). "Palingenesis" was a term by which Ballanche referred to the successive regenerations of the society, and he incorporated a progressive vision of Christianity in his work even as he insisted reverently that Christianity was forever immutable.

=== Career ===
Ballanche first earned his living as a printer. His first published work was Du sentiment considéré dans son rapport avec la littérature (1802), a work in the vein of Chateaubriand's recently published Génie du christianisme. He made the acquaintance of Julie Récamier in 1812, and moved to Paris shortly thereafter, where he attended regularly her salon at l'Abbaye-aux-Bois.

In works like Antigone (1814), Essais sur les institutions sociales ("Essay on Social Institutions", 1818), Le Vieillard et le jeune homme ("The Old Man and the Youth", 1819), L'Homme sans nom ("The Man without a Name", 1820) and Élégie ("Elegy", 1820), he developed the idea that the French Revolution was endowed with a divine significance. Such a view was common enough in counterrevolutionary circles. But unlike religious thinkers who conferred upon the Church the task of interpreting this significance, Ballanche developed a theory of language. In Ballanche's view, to name something was in some way to participate in creation. For Ballanche, this creative power of speech had the same essence as poetry, and he developed a poetics of the symbol that played a role in the thinking of those who gave birth to a new vision of the poet and of poetry that soon came to be known as romanticism.

Ballanche's life work, never finished, is generally known as Palingénésie. The idea of this "great work" germinated in him in the 1820s, and he announced what was intended to be a vast philosophico-poetic epic of the past, present and future in its opening volume, Prolégomènes, published in 1827. There he described his ambition to write "the true history of the human race". The first volume dealt with Greece in Orphée ("Orpheus", 1829), and the second, never finished, with the Roman Republic in Formule générale de l'histoire de tous les peuples appliquée à l'histoire du peuple romain ("General Formula of the History of All Peoples Applied to the History of the Roman People"), fragments of which were published in reviews from 1829 to 1834. The third and final volume, which was never finished, was first announced to be La Ville des expiations ("The City of Expiations"), though Ballanche published La Vision d'Hébal ("Hébal's Vision", 1831). Because Ballanche's thought continued to develop in the 1830s and 1840s he changed plans for the work many times, and the history of his works is enormously complicated and confusing.

In a sense, this was because of Ballanche's awareness of the difficulty of the task he had set himself. He never worked out his system to his own satisfaction. The turbulence of nineteenth-century French history constantly gave him new food for thought. It is possible, however, to sketch the elements of his fundamental vision.

=== Philosophy ===
Ballanche's highly original system was a working out of the notion of progress through ordeals. In a sense, his thought is a secular version of Fall and Redemption, adapted to a theological progressivism – an "optimistic theory of original sin and its consequences", in the words of Paul Bénichou, who has written extensively on Ballanche's historical importance in Le Sacre de l'écrivain (1973), Le Temps des prophètes (1977) and "Le Grand Œuvre de Ballanche", Revue d'histoire littéraire de la France (Sept.-Oct. 1975), collected in Variétés critiques (1996).

For Ballanche, a particular form of political authority – Louis XVI, for example – could be doomed to fall without being contemptible. The historical vision that he was developing, and which he expressed in a symbolic language that many found difficult, was one in which a past epoch could possess its own rightness and legitimacy, even as it had lost the right to continue.

Ballanche compared himself to Janus, the two-headed god of mythology, because he looked simultaneously in two different directions. His tragic view of history embraced change, while regarding the means by which it was accomplished as the source of an endless need for future expiation.

== Legacy ==
Ballanche occupied – and continues to occupy – an uneasy borderland between progressive and counterrevolutionary camps. He dreamed of himself, timidly, as the one who could reconcile them. But this was not to be: his view of the social order as supernatural in character was not intelligible (or not acceptable) to those on the left, and his willingness to acknowledge the legitimacy of radical change did not endear him to those on the right.
