= The Natchez =

Painting by Eugène Delacroix

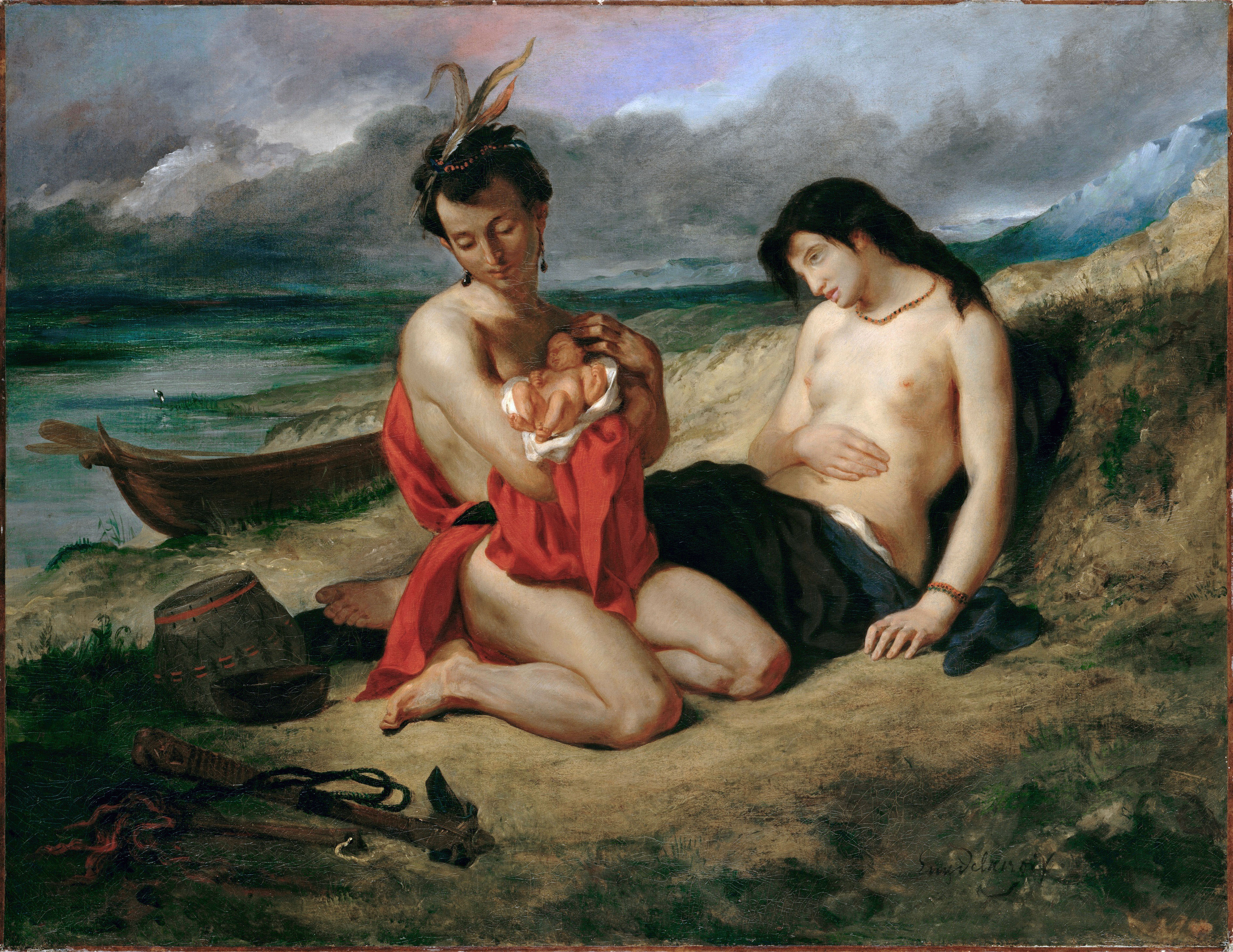
- Artist: Eugène Delacroix
- Year: 1834–35
- Location: Metropolitan Museum of Art

The Natchez is an oil-on-canvas painting executed ca. 1834–35 by the French Romantic artist Eugène Delacroix. It depicts a Native American couple with their newborn child. The painting was inspired by a passage in Chateaubriand's Atala, which describes the family as the last members of the Natchez tribe after a massacre committed by the French. Delacroix referred to the figures in the painting as "savages", yet he also showed an admiration for the beauty of the cultural objects surrounding them, such as jewelry, tools, and clothing. The painting reflects Delacroix's recurring fascination with the persecution of the innocent, a theme he had previously explored in The Massacre at Chios.
