= Paul Bénichou =

French/Algerian literary historian & writer (1908-2001)

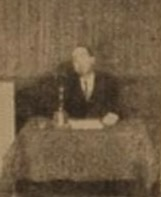
- Bénichou in 1945
- Born: September 19, 1908; Tlemcen, French Algeria
- Died: May 14, 2001
- Occupation: Writer

Paul Bénichou (French: [beniʃu]; 19 September 1908 – 14 May 2001) was a French/Algerian writer, intellectual, critic, and literary historian.

Bénichou first achieved prominence in 1948 with Morales du grand siècle, his work on the social context of the French seventeenth-century classics. Later Bénichou undertook a prodigious research program, seeking to understand the radical pessimism and disappointment expressed by mid-nineteenth writers. This project resulted in a series of major works, beginning with Le Sacre de l’écrivain, 1750-1830 (1973; Eng. trans. 1999 [The Consecration of the Writer, 1750-1830]). A 1995 volume, Selon Mallarmé, may be considered an extension of this series. Together, these works amount to an important reinterpretation of French romanticism. Critic Tzvetan Todorov described Bénichou’s special interest as “the thought of poets.” More generally, though, Paul Bénichou’s work contributed to the understanding of the creative writer's place in modernity, and illuminated the role of writers in legitimating the institutions and values of modern society.

== Early years ==
Bénichou was born in Tlemcen, French Algeria (now Tlemcen, Algeria), to an Algerian Jewish family. His intellectual brilliance soon called him to Paris. He had won the annual concours général des lycées for best thème latin in his final year of secondary school at the lycée d'Oran. After the baccalauréat (1924), he came to the Lycée Louis-le-Grand in Paris to prepare the École Normale Supérieure at the time a school of the University of Paris; he was successful in 1926 and studied there, where Jean-Paul Sartre, Raymond Aron, Paul Nizan and Maurice Merleau-Ponty were among his fellow students. He obtained his license in 1927 and his agrégation in 1930, then becoming a secondary teacher.

During his student years Bénichou was active in radical politics and literary surrealism, writing poetry; his name is mentioned in Maurice Nadeau’s Histoire du surréalisme. But it was as a scholar and a teacher that Bénichou made his mark. While teaching in French secondary schools he had all but completed his first major work, Morales du grand siècle, when Hitler unleashed his blitzkrieg. After the disaster of 1940 and the installation of the virulently anti-Semitic Vichy regime, Bénichou, as a Jew, was denied the right to earn his livelihood by teaching in French schools, and as an Algerian Jew, found himself stripped of French nationality.

After living in the French unoccupied zone, Bénichou could leave in 1942 with his family to Argentina, where he had been offered a teaching position in the university of Mendoza; afterwards, he taught in Buenos Aires, at the Institut Français (co-founded by Roger Caillois). While in the Argentine capital he participated in literary circles and met Jorge Luis Borges, whom he and his daughter, Sylvia Roubaud, would later translate; he also developed a scholarly interest in medieval Spanish literature and published groundbreaking work on the Spanish romancero.

The publication and critical success of Morales du grand siècle (1948; Eng. trans. 1971 [Man and Ethics]) established his scholarly reputation; the volume has never gone out of print and has sold more than 100,000 copies. But it had been refused as a doctoral work and Paul Bénichou could therefore not become a University teacher in France. Returned to Paris in 1949, he got a position at the prestigious Lycée Condorcet, where Marcel Proust studied in the 1880s; he continued to teach there until 1958.

== "The Consecration of the Writer" ==
It was in the early 1950s that Bénichou undertook his most ambitious and important scholarly project. He had always been struck by the pessimism of the great French writers of the mid-nineteenth century—that of Charles Baudelaire in particular. What could account for Baudelaire’s radical pessimism, shared by writers like Gustave Flaubert, in an era of general confidence, progress, and hope? For twenty years, Bénichou researched the history of ideas about creative writers’ relation to society. This research culminated in a series of major works that purport to solve this problem. (Ironically, Bénichou never wrote a major work on Baudelaire, though he published a number of significant essays on the author of Les Fleurs du mal.) Taken together, these works constitute a coherent study of French literature and thought from 1750 to 1898, analyzing the spiritual predicament of modern France and shedding light on the literature of other Western nations as well as on contemporary problems of global civilization. These interrelated works, which Bénichou began to publish only at the age of 65, are:

- Le Sacre de l'écrivain (1973; English translation 1999 [’’The Consecration of the Writer’’])
- Le Temps des prophètes (1977)
- Les Mages romantiques (1988)
- L'École du désenchantement (1992)
- Selon Mallarmé (1995)

The first four works were republished posthumously by Gallimard in a two-volume set under the title Romantismes français (2004).

Bénichou was invited to teach at Harvard University, where he taught one semester a year from 1959 until his retirement from teaching in 1979. He was elected a Fellow of the American Academy of Arts and Sciences in 1976.

In his later years, Bénichou remained active and in good health, working in his apartment on the rue Notre-Dame-des-Champs in the Montparnasse district of Paris. He continued to write and publish; when he died in Paris, at the age of 92, he was writing a commentary on the haunting, enigmatic poems by Gérard de Nerval known as The Chimeras. He is interred in Paris’s Cimetière du Père-Lachaise, not far from the tomb of Frédéric Chopin.

== Bénichou’s ideas ==
Bénichou considered modernity the product of a religiously grounded society faced with a decline in the credibility of its ideological and religious foundations. This decline occurred at the same time as, and to a large extent as the result of, the rise of a belief in the essential self-sufficiency of human beings, belief in human autonomy being a hallmark of the Enlightenment. The Enlightenment was accompanied by a widespread hope for a regenerating elite that would help usher in a new, more just social order. The “consecration of the writer” emerged from these two complementary though divergent tendencies in the period from 1760 to 1789, during which the writer’s mission was widely believed to be that of guiding humanity to the promised land of the new order.

The traumatic experience of the French Revolution modified this program, bringing about a convergence of two tendencies that had, till then, been divergent. On the one hand, the secular, anti-religious tendencies of the Enlightenment were modified, becoming more accommodating of religious notions, as seen in different ways in the work of Germaine de Staël, Benjamin Constant, and Victor Cousin, among others. On the other hand, the experience of the Revolution and the failure of its initial hopes contributed to a religious revival, seen in the works of Chateaubriand, Balanche, and Lamartine. It is to this "deep convergence," as Bénichou put it, that the consecration of the poet-thinker is due, in the heyday of French romanticism in the years after 1820.

The changes Bénichou describes were brought about by "the rise of an intellectual corps possessing new prestige and a new social make-up," a "corps" that emerged transfigured after the Revolution to lay claim to "spiritual authority" (The Consecration of the Writer, p. 339). In Bénichou's work, "spiritual authority" is a key concept, though he never defines it concisely. From the body of Bénichou's writing, however, emerges a vision of humanity with deep-rooted needs both for belief and a social doctrine of legitimation capable of enlisting the support of society generally. In France, the Roman Catholic Church traditionally fulfilled this role, but a "new spiritual power [was] born in the eighteenth century from the disrepute of the old Church" (ibid., p. 331). It was the rise of this "philosophic faith" (which Bénichou also calls the "faith of the eighteenth century," the "modern faith," the "new faith," "philosophical humanism," and the "secular faith") that initiated the crisis of modernity.

== Bénichou and the problem of modernity ==
For Bénichou, then, the problem of modernity is essentially that of belief. Romanticism is "the vast prologue or first important act of a longer history that continues in our own time" (The Consecration of the Writer, p. 9), or, intellectually, as "the general debate, which still goes on, between the freedom of thought and expression [la liberté critique] and dogma" (Le Temps des prophètes, p. 11). Historically, this debate first emerges in earnest in the 16th century.

The key to the drama, in Bénichou's view, is the weakening of the West's traditional "spiritual power." Modernity appears as an extended period of conflict among various efforts to redefine what such a power might be in the future. Independent writers have, in these circumstances, offered a social location for a secular version of "spiritual authority"—the pouvoir spiritual laïque of the subtitle to Le Sacre de l'écrivain. Historians who ignore this issue in favor of dimensions that are exclusively social, economic, or political are missing something essential, in Bénichou's view. "The Romantic period, in the final analysis, corresponds to an enormous effort to give a corrected edition of the system of the Enlightenment that would be free of the unfortunate aspects that the Terror had caused to stand out so strikingly," Bénichou said in a late interview ("Parcours de l'écrivain," Le Débat (Mar.-Apr. 1989), p. 25).

But consensus on the role of the writer was short-lived. Already shaken in the aftermath of the July Revolution of 1830, after 1848 the poet-thinker ceased to be a credible spiritual authority in the eyes of bourgeois society. In France, the Church resumed its status as the official spiritual power. Modern conservatism began to emerge, as "the eighteenth century begins to be the object of a vast intellectual disapproval" (ibid., p. 28). But poets, writers, and artists, for their part, were unwilling to lay down their claims to spiritual authority. Instead, they became "disenchanted"—a disenchantment that has continued to the present day and that has even been institutionalized in many artistic circles.

== Bénichou's critical method ==
Finally, Paul Bénichou's critical method depends on an interpretive ideal of plausibilité ('plausibility' or 'credibility'), i.e. fidelity to the thought embodied in the work, so that any interpretation of a work ought, at least in principle, to be acceptable to its author. He viewed structuralism, post-structuralism, and enthusiasm for literary theory in literary criticism with skepticism. In his view, these are inherently flawed approaches, in that they tend to reduce the work of literature to one of its modalities. Bénichou insisted, instead, that a work of literature is inherently heterogeneous and multifaceted. His hostility to single-minded approaches to criticism and disdain for popular contemporary critical schools delayed appreciation of his work during his own lifetime, but this neglect seems, paradoxically, to have contributed to its long-term vitality.

== Bibliography ==
- Named link: Bibliography of works by and about Paul Bénichou, with annotations

About Paul Bénichou

- Sylvie Romanowski and Monique Bilezikian, Homage to Paul Bénichou, Birmingham (Alabama), Summa Publications, 1994 ISBN 0-917786-98-X
- "Paul Bénichou Memorial Minute", in the Harvard Gazette, 2005 (contains many biographical informations)
