= Mémoires d'Outre-Tombe =

Autobiography of François-René de Chateaubriand

Memoirs from Beyond the Grave
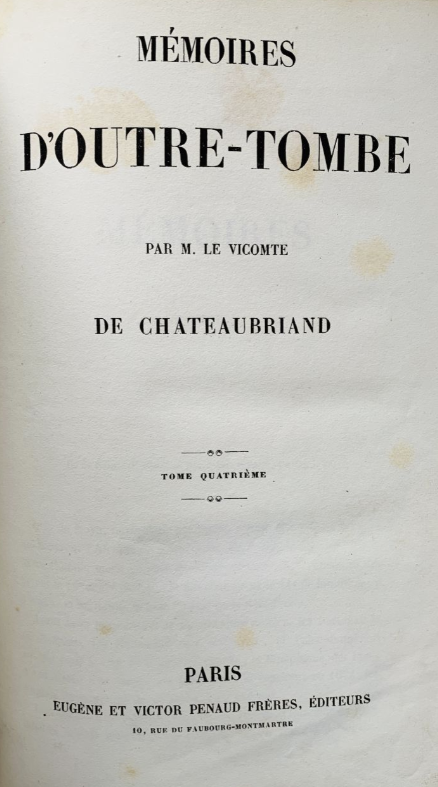
- Title page for Mémoires d'Outre-Tombe (1849)
- Author: François-René de Chateaubriand
- Original title: Mémoires d'Outre-Tombe
- Language: French
- Published: 1849 (Vol. 1); 1850 (Vol. 2)
- Publication place: France
- Media type: Print
- OCLC: 829269852
- LC Class: DC255.C4 A4 1849
- Original text: Mémoires d'Outre-Tombe at French Wikisource

Mémoires d'Outre-Tombe (English: Memoirs from Beyond the Grave) is the memoir of François-René de Chateaubriand (1768–1848), collected and published posthumously in two volumes in 1849 and 1850, respectively. Chateaubriand, a writer, politician, diplomat and historian, remains widely regarded as the founder of French Romanticism.

Although the work shares characteristics with earlier French "memoirs" (like the Memoirs of Saint-Simon), the Mémoires d'Outre-Tombe are also inspired by the Confessions of Jean-Jacques Rousseau: in addition to providing a record of political and historical events, Chateaubriand includes details of his private life and his personal aspirations.

The work abounds in instances of the poetic prose at which Chateaubriand excelled. On the other hand, the melancholy of the autobiography helped establish Chateaubriand as the idol of the young French Romantics; a young Victor Hugo wrote: "I will be Chateaubriand or nothing."

== Genesis of the work ==
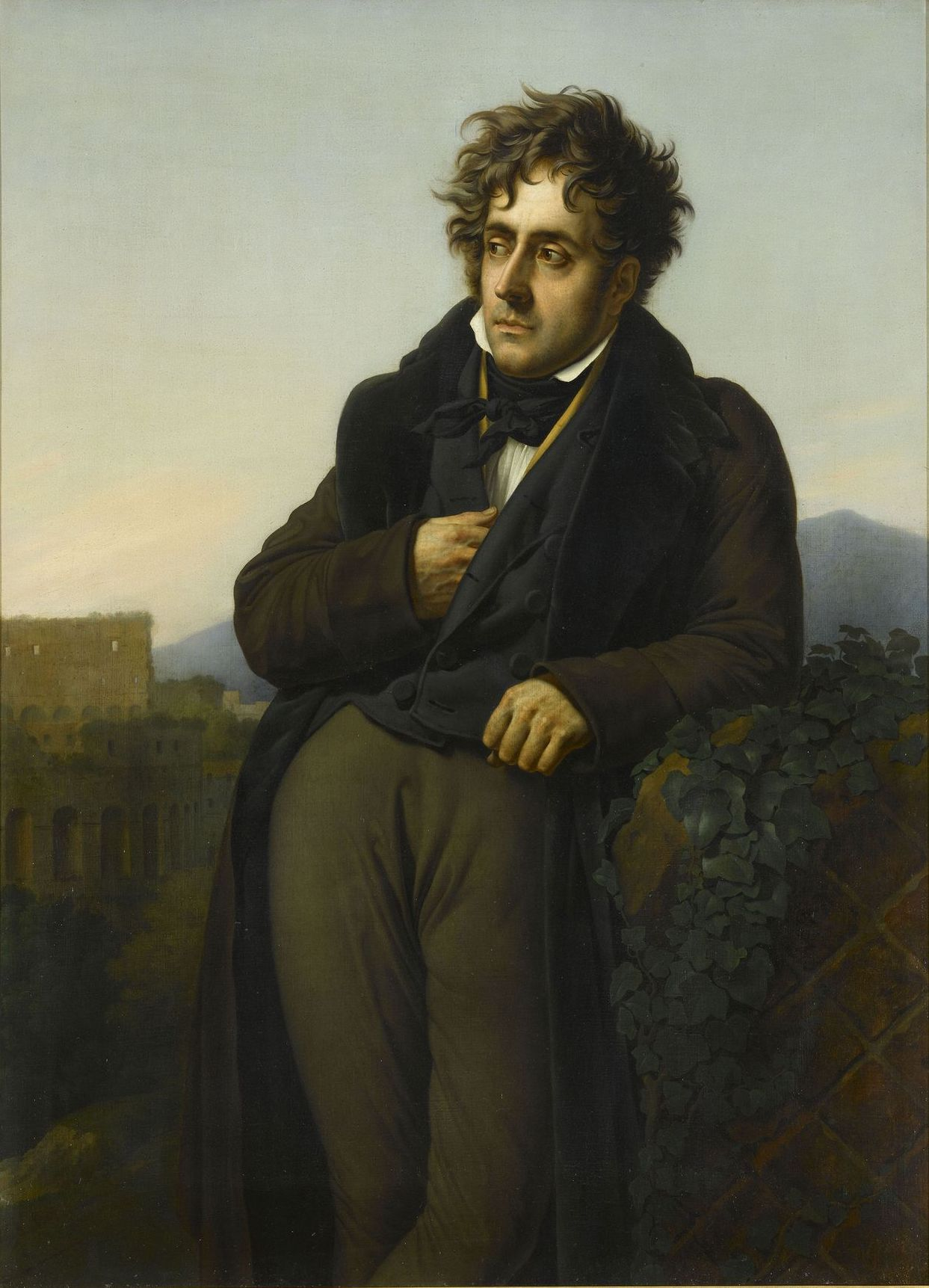
Chateaubriand Meditating on the Ruins of Rome (1809), by Anne-Louis Girodet de Roussy-Trioson. Oil on canvas.

It was while in Rome at the close of 1803 that Chateaubriand decided to write his memoirs; however, he did not begin writing them until 1809, and even then demands from other projects slowed his progress. In 1817 he returned to the memoirs. The first manuscript, probably written while he was serving as ambassador to London, did not reach completion until 1826. At this point, he intended to entitle the book Memories of My Life.

In 1830, however, Chateaubriand decided to change the scope of the work, revising the title to Mémoires d'Outre-Tombe, making a thorough revision of the original text, and writing several new volumes. He divided his life before 1830 into three periods: soldier and traveler, novelist, and statesman. The project had by now become more ambitious; indeed, he tried to reproduce not only his personal exploits, but the epic historical and political events of the era.

== Publication ==
After fragmented public readings of his work in salons, in 1836 Chateaubriand yielded the rights to his work to a society that published it until his death, paying him accordingly. Having obtained this economic stability, he completed the work with a fourth set of volumes. In 1841 he wrote an ample conclusion and kept revising parts of the work until 1847, as evidenced by the revision dates in the manuscript.

Chateaubriand originally intended for the work to be published at least fifty years after his death, but his financial troubles forced him, in his words, "to mortgage [his] tomb".

== English translations ==
There have been a number of English translations. An abridged translation by Robert Baldick was first published by Alfred A. Knopf in 1961, and later, in paperback, by Penguin Books in 1972. British author Anthony Kline published a complete translation in 2005 that is freely available for non-commercial use. A New York Review Books edition translated by Alex Andriesse was published in 2018, covering the years 1768–1800 (first 12 of 42 books), with a second volume, covering 1800–1815 (books 13 to 24), released on September 27, 2022. Volume 3, covering 1815–1830 (books 25 to 34), was published on December 2, 2025.
