= The Genius of Christianity =

1802 book by François-René de Chateaubriand

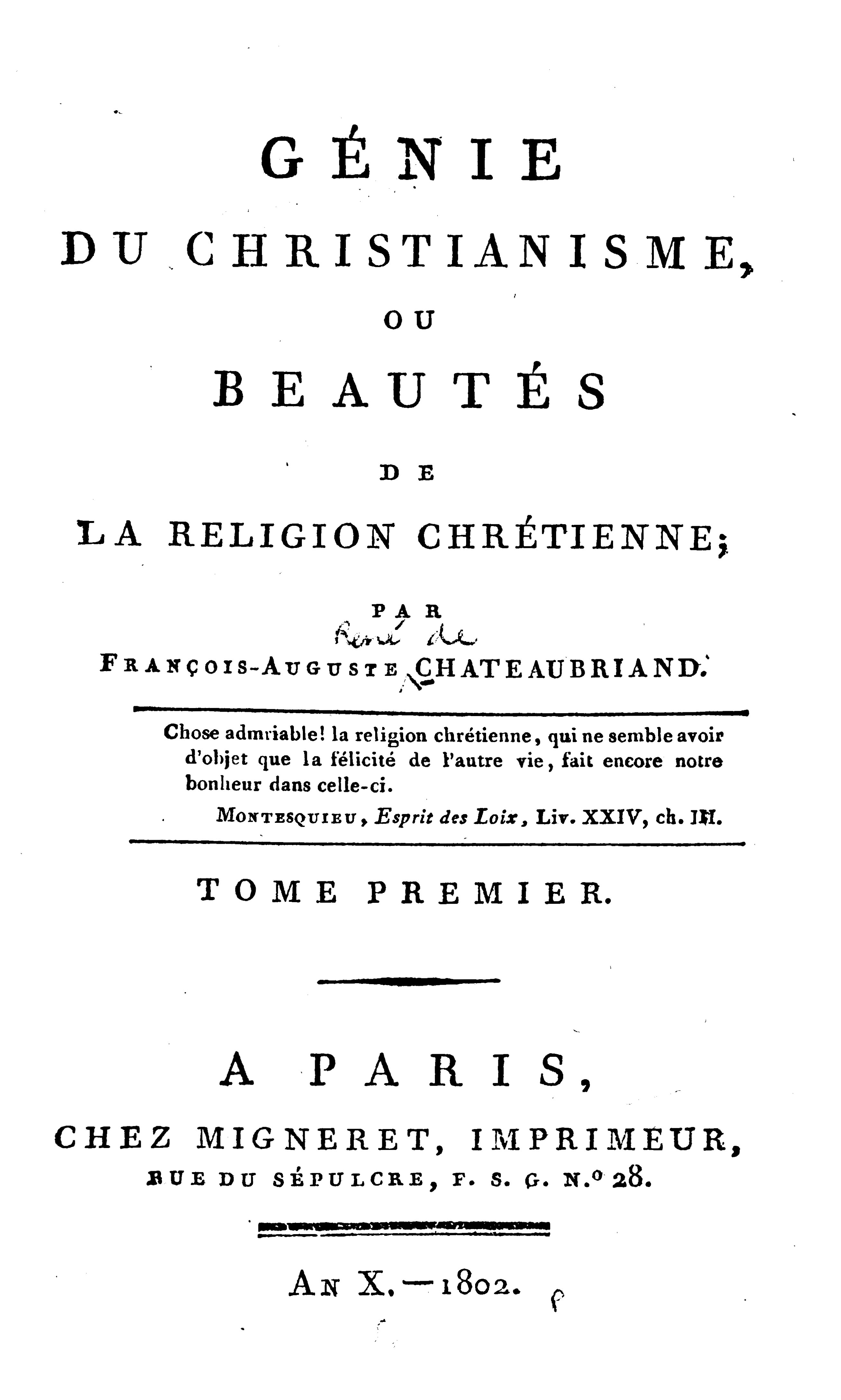
- Title page of the 1802 edition
- Original title: Le Génie du christianisme
- Language: French
- Publication date: 1802
- Text: The Genius of Christianity at Internet Archive

The Genius of Christianity, or Beauties of the Christian Religion (French: Le Génie du christianisme, ou Beautés de la religion chrétienne) is a work by the French author François-René de Chateaubriand, written during his exile in England in the 1790s as a defense of the Catholic faith, then under attack during the French Revolution.

It was first published in France in 1802, after Chateaubriand returned to France following Napoleon's general amnesty for émigrés who had fled the Revolution. Napoleon, who had recently signed the Concordat with the pope, initially made use of Chateaubriand's book as propaganda to win support among French Catholics. Within five years, he would quarrel with the author and send him into internal exile.

In The Genius of Christianity, Chateaubriand defends the wisdom and beauty of Christianity against the attacks on it by French Enlightenment philosophers and revolutionary politicians. The book had an immense influence on nineteenth-century culture and not just on religious life. In fact, it might be said its greatest impact was on art and literature: it was a major inspiration for the Romantic movement.

== Work ==
The book emerged from Chateaubriand's attempt to understand the causes of the French Revolution, which had led to the deaths of many of his friends and family members. Sometime in the late 1790s, Chateaubriand had reverted to the Catholic faith of his childhood. He felt that France had lost its way during the Enlightenment period, when leading intellectuals, such as Voltaire, were hostile to traditional religion. In the work, Chateaubriand aims to prove "Christianity comes from God, because it is excellent". With that objective in mind, he is particularly interested in the artistic contributions of the Christian religion, comparing them with ancient and pagan civilizations. The principal theme of the book is that "only Christianity is able to explain progress in arts and letters".

Chateaubriand accuses the writers of the eighteenth century of misunderstanding God. He makes an exception for Jean-Jacques Rousseau, who had "a shadow of religion". For Chateaubriand, Voltaire is an inferior playwright to Jean Racine because Voltaire was not a Christian.

== Structure and contents ==
Chateaubriand divided Génie du christianisme into four parts:

- Part One: Dogmas and Doctrine. Divided into six books: Mysteries and Sacraments; Virtues and Moral Laws; Truth of the Scriptures, the Fall of Man; Truth of the Scriptures (Continued), Objections against the Moral System of Moses; the Existence of God proved by the Marvels of Nature: Immortality of the Soul, proved by Morals and Sentiments.
- Part Two: The Poetry of Christianity. Divided into five books: General Survey of Christian Epics; Poetry in Relation to Human Characters; Poetry in Relation to Human Passions (Continued); On the Marvellous, or Poetry in Relation to Supernatural Beings; the Bible and Homer.
- Part Three: Fine Arts and Literature. Divided into five books: Fine Arts; Philosophy; History; Eloquence; Harmonies of the Christian Religion with Scenes of Nature and the Passions of the Human Heart.
- Part Four: Ritual. Divided into six books: Churches, Ornaments, Singing, Prayers, Solemnities, etc.; Tombs; General Survey of the Clergy; Missions; Military Orders or Chivalry; Services Rendered to Society by the Clergy and the Christian Religion in General.

The original edition of Génie du christianisme also contained two novellas by Chateaubriand, René and Atala, both of them romantic tales about American Indians. The novellas had already been published separately. Together with the related story Les Natchez, which went unpublished until 1827, these books continued to bring fame to Chateaubriand throughout his life.

== Influence ==
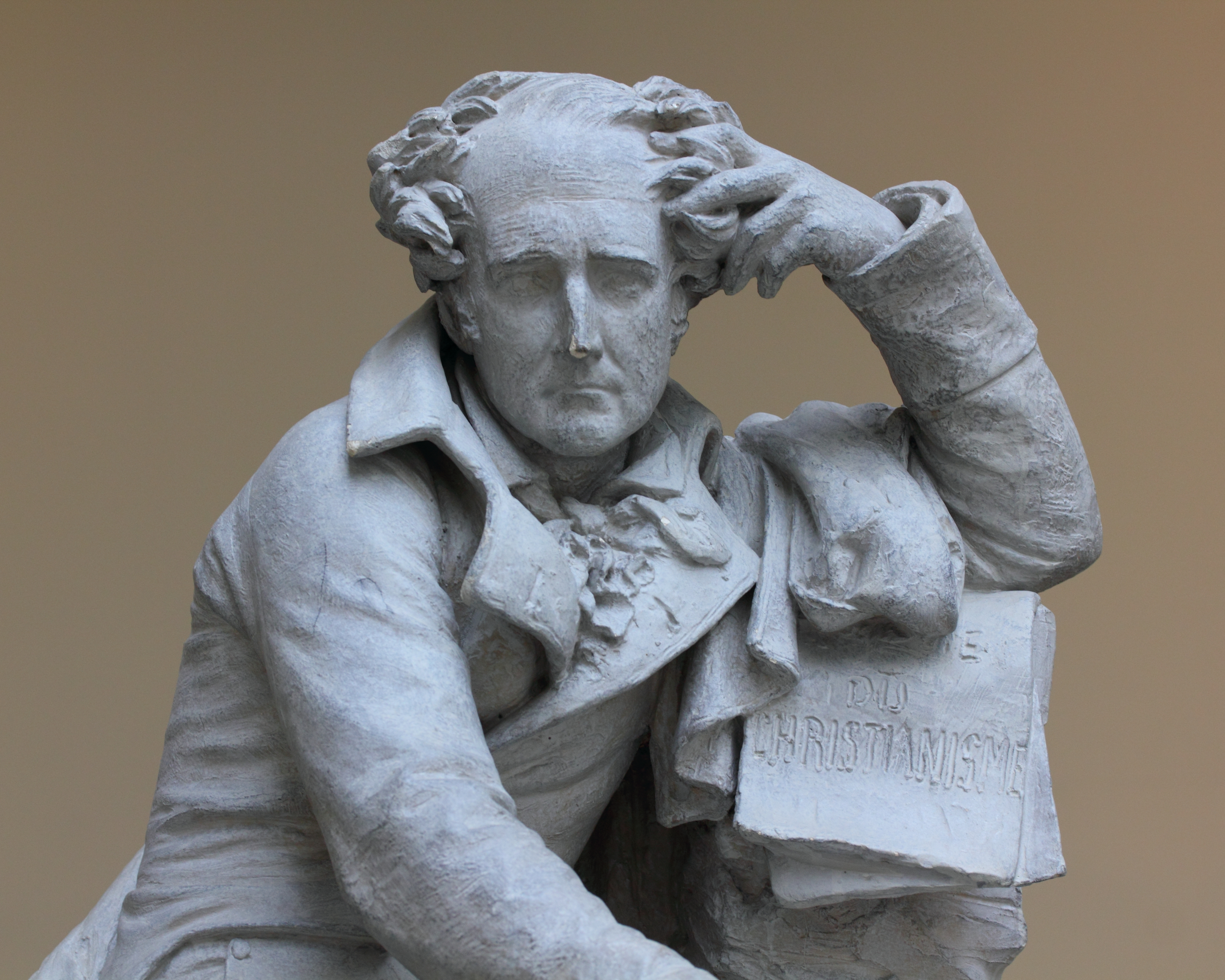
Statue by Aimé Millet depicting François-René de Chateaubriand with The Genius of Christianity

Génie du christianisme had a considerable influence on the history of literary and religious ideas in nineteenth-century France. Written in a Classical style, but early Romantic in sensibility, it glorified new sources of inspiration, such as Gothic architecture and the great epics of the Middle Ages. As David Cairns writes: "Beyond its specific purpose, Génie du christianisme set a current of sympathy flowing between the author and a whole generation of young French men and women, kindling their imaginations over a wide range of feelings and ideas: the power of the great epic writers, Nature in its immense diversity and grandeur, the poetry of ruins, the spell of the distant past, the beauty of immemorial popular rituals and the haunting melancholy of the music accompanying them, the pangs of awakening consciousness and the perils and ardours of the solitary adolescent soul. More than any other work, it was the primer of early French Romanticism". Besides this, the book served as a model for the renewal of French Catholicism, inspiring numerous authors, including Dom Guéranger and Félicité Robert de La Mennais.

== See also ==
- Mandarin paradox
