= Naches =

Naches is a name used in Washington state, United States. The name may refer to:

- Naches, Washington
- Naches River
- Naches Pass
- Naches Peak
- Naches Trail

== See also ==
- Natchez (disambiguation)
- Naches (Yiddish)
