= Atala (novella) =

Early novella by French author François-René de Chateaubriand

Atala, ou les Amours de deux sauvages dans le désert
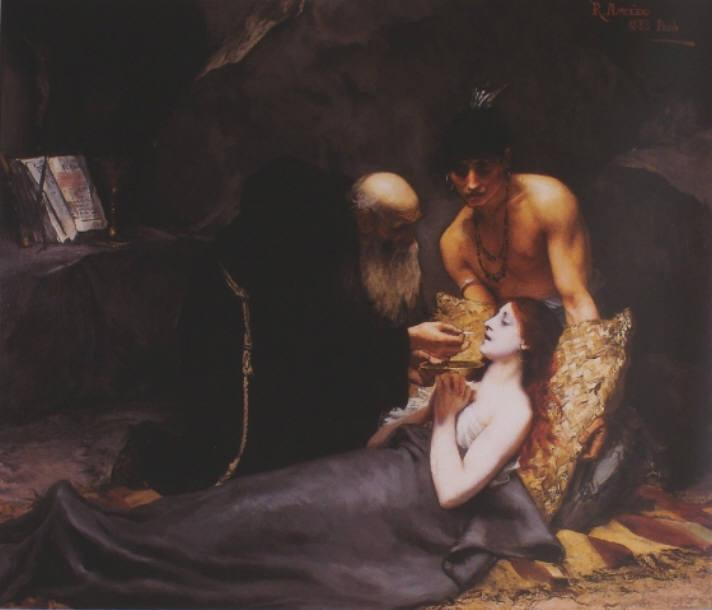
- "The Death of Atala" by Rodolfo Amoedo (1883)
- Author: François-René de Chateaubriand
- Language: French
- Genre: Romanticism, novella
- Publisher: Migneret/Librairie Dupont
- Publication date: April 2, 1801
- Publication place: France
- Media type: Print

Atala, ou Les Amours de deux sauvages dans le désert (English: Atala, or The Loves of two Indian savages in the desert) is an early novella by French author François-René de Chateaubriand, first published on 12 germinal IX (2 April 1801). The story is told from the point of view of the 73-year-old hero, Chactas, whose story is preserved by an oral tradition among the Seminoles. The work, at least partially inspired by his travels in North America, reflects the eighteenth-century French Romanticism and exoticism of its time, and went through five editions in its first year. It was adapted frequently for stage, and translated into many languages.

Along with René, Atala began as a discarded fragment from a long prose epic the author had composed between 1793 and 1799, Les Natchez, which would not be made public until 1826. In 1802, both Atala and René were published as part of Chateaubriand's Génie du christianisme.

== Themes ==
=== Christianity ===
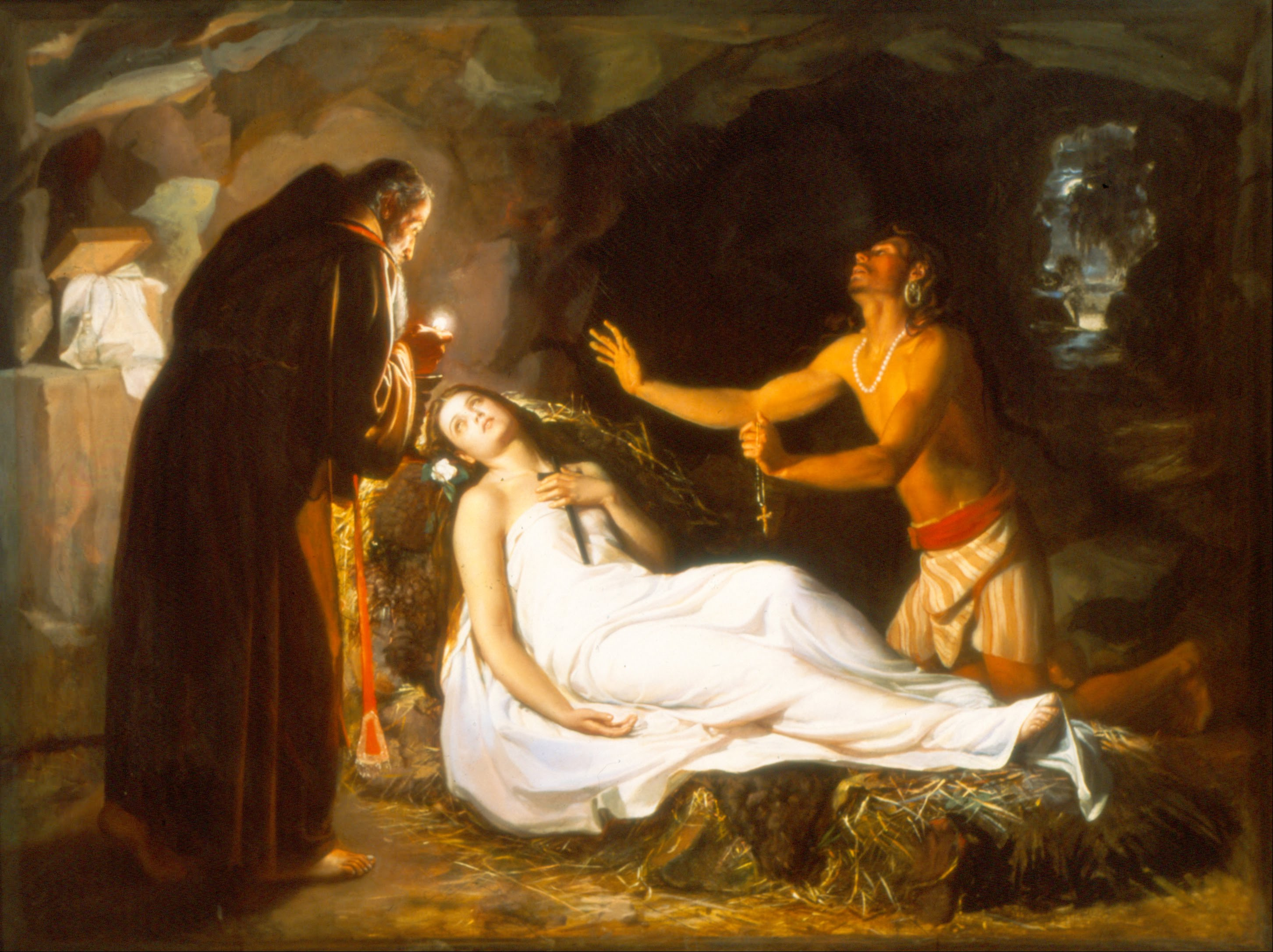
Últimos momentos de Atala by Luis Monroy, 1871

Contrasting the cruelty and warfare of the natives with the saintliness of the missionary, it is intended as a condemnation of the philosophes' praise of the "noble savage"; the author insisted that the Natchez man Chactas was "more than half civilised", and positive values are considered more or less synonymous with Christianity and Europeanisation. Nevertheless, the decision to portray at least two natives sympathetically irked later generations of readers, whose attitudes had been shaped by scientific racism, and even today it is often assumed by casual readers (who do not read the prefaces) that Chateaubriand was a supporter, rather than a denouncer, of the "noble savage" concept. In later writings on native peoples, Chateaubriand conceded a surprising amount of ground to Rousseau, but continued to insist on the primacy of Christianity over all other religions and forms of spirituality.

=== Nature and wilderness ===
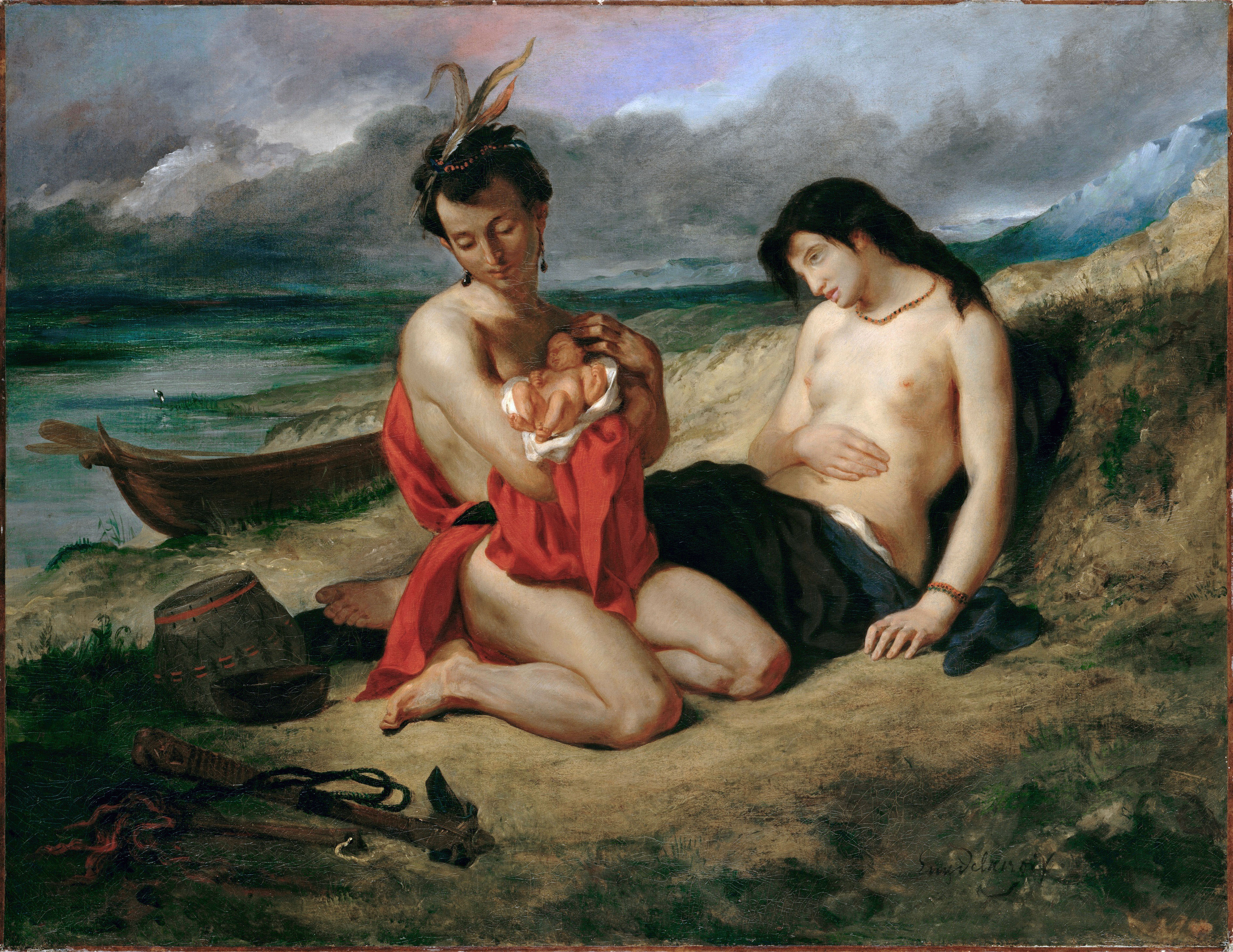
Les Natchez by Eugène Delacroix, 1835

In the prologue, Chateaubriand starts the novella with a vividly detailed description of the natural environment of formerly French North America more than two pages long. The expanse of wilderness is portrayed as empty and its nature as an Eden, referring to the biblical Garden of Eden. Throughout the text, this image of the New World as empty wilderness is also used to overlook the presence of indigenous peoples.

While the book's accuracy on the subject of the North American flora is a controversial matter, it seems to be agreed that Chateaubriand never saw much of the southern territories he describes and his descriptions are based on naturalists' books. Some critics, however, argue that this is a deliberate decision, intended to relate the landscape of America to that of biblical and Miltonesque Eden, creating an extended metaphor of a paradise both post and pre-fall, symbolizing the internal conflict of the character's hearts.

== Characters (in order of appearance) ==
- Chactas: Natchez Native American who serves as the main character and narrator for the whole story except the prologue
- René: Frenchman that was accepted into the Natchez tribe/nation and adopted as a son by Chactas
- Celuta: Native American wife of René
- Outalissi: The father of Chactas
- Lopez: Spanish man who sheltered Chactas in St. Augustine and biological father of Atala; also referred to as Philip
- Simaghan: The head of the group of Muscogee and Seminole natives who captured Chactas after leaving St. Augustine and adopted father of Atala
- Miscou: The grandfather of Chactas and father of Outalissi
- Atala: Love of Chactas, biological daughter of Lopez, adopted daughter of Simaghan; serves as secondary main character
- The Hermit: Christian priest and missionary who lives in a cave and small mission village in the mountains; also referred to as Father Aubry

== Plot summary ==
The frame story: A young disillusioned Frenchman, René, has joined an Indian tribe and married a woman named Céluta. On a hunting expedition, one moonlit night, René asks Chactas, the old man who adopted him, to relate the story of his life.

In the prologue, Chateaubriand describes the territorial landscape of former French-held North America and presents the backstory of Chactas as a transition into the novel and its frame story, handing off the story's narration to Chactas.

At the age of seventeen, the Natchez man Chactas loses his father during a battle against the Muscogees. He flees to St Augustine, Florida, where he is raised in the household of the Spaniard Lopez. After 2½ years ("thirty moons"), he sets out for home, but is captured by the Muscogees and Seminoles. The chief Simagan sentences him to be burnt alive in their village.

The women take pity on him during the weeks of travel, and bring him gifts each night. One woman, Atala (the half-caste Christian daughter of Simagan), tries in vain to help him escape. On arrival at Apalachucla, his bonds are loosened and he is saved from death by her intervention. They run away and roam the wilderness for 27 days before being caught in a huge storm. While they are sheltering, Atala tells Chactas that her father was Lopez, and he realises that she is the daughter of his adoptive father.

Lightning strikes a tree close by, and they run at random before hearing a church bell. Encountering a dog, they are met by its owner, Père Aubry, and he leads them through the storm to his idyllic mission. Aubry's kindness and force of personality impress Chactas greatly.

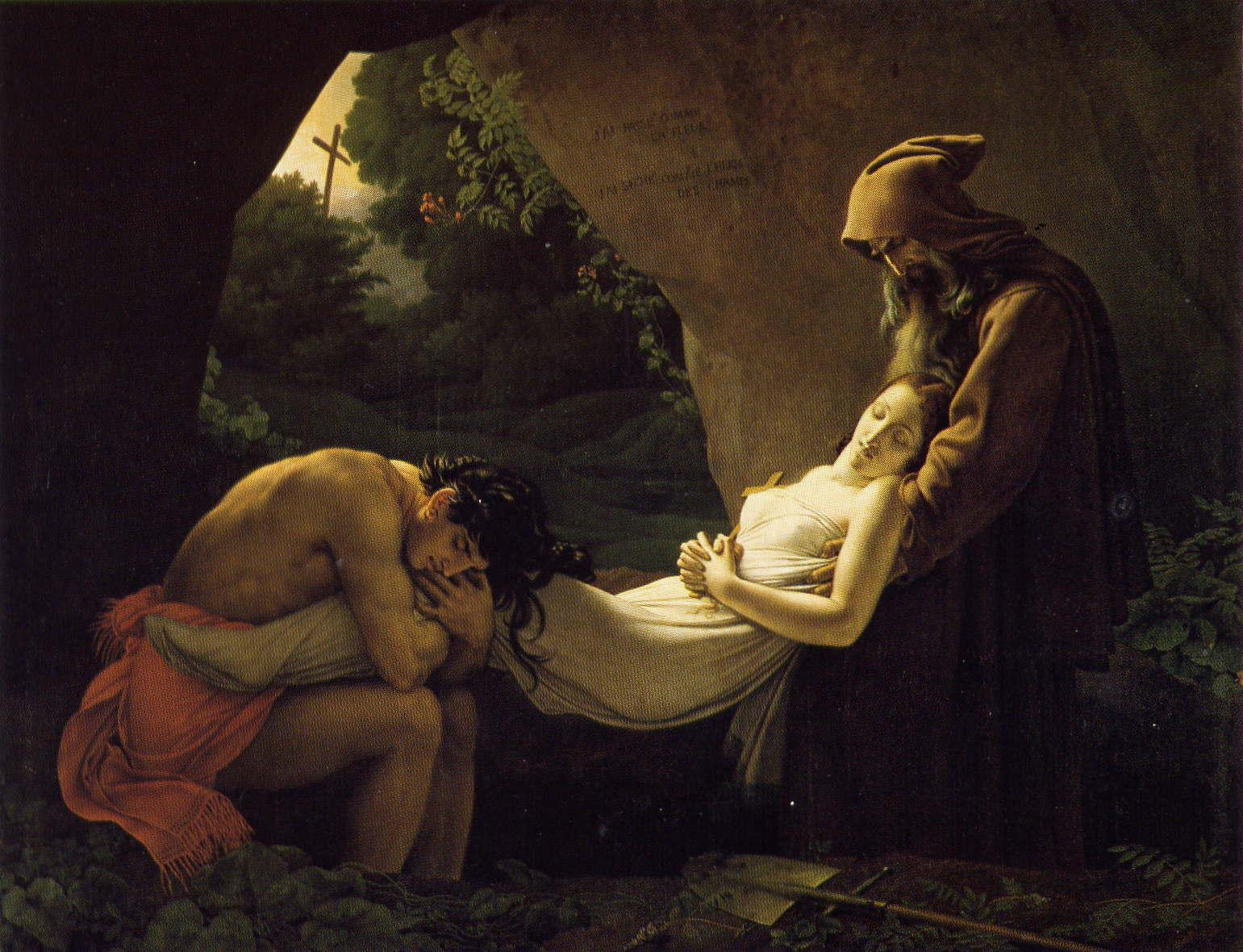
The Funeral of Atala, by Girodet (1808)

Atala falls in love with Chactas, but cannot marry him, as she has taken a vow of chastity. In despair, she takes poison. Aubry assumes that she is merely ill, but in the presence of Chactas, she reveals what she has done, and Chactas is filled with anger until the missionary tells them that Christianity permits the renunciation of vows. They tend to her, but she dies, and the day after the funeral, Chactas takes Aubry's advice and leaves the mission.

In the epilogue, it is revealed that Aubry was later killed by Cherokees, and that, according to Chactas's granddaughter, neither René nor the aged Chactas survived a massacre during an uprising. The full account of Chactas's wanderings after Atala's death, in Les Natchez, gives a somewhat different version of their fates.

== Influence ==
Atala proved very popular. Between 1801 and 1805, at least 11 editions were printed, and imagery from the book became common in the decorative arts with plates, clock faces, and furniture being decorated with scenes and images from the novella. In his memoirs, Chateaubriand mentions roadside inns being decorated with images of Atala, Chactas, and Aubry and wax figurines of the characters being sold at fairs. Among the artists inspired to create works of art based on Atala were Léon Cogniet, Anne-Louis Girodet de Roussy-Trioson, Pierre-Jérôme Lordon, Eugène Delacroix, Natale Carta, Andrea Gastaldi, and Jean-Baptiste-Siméon Chardin.

The novella also inspired at least two operas: Giovanni Pacini's Atala, an opéra seria in three acts, Antonio Peracchi booklet, in 1818, and Andrea Butera's Atala in 1851.

The Atala butterfly (Eumaeus atala) was named after the character of Atala by Cuban zoologist Felipe Poey.
