= USS Natchez =

USS Natchez may refer to the following ships operated by the United States Navy:

- USS Natchez (1827), a sloop-of-war launched in 1827.
- USS Natchez (PG-85), the name and designation of USS Oceanographer (AGS-3) from April to May 1942
- USS Natchez (PF-2), an Asheville-class patrol frigate, launched in 1942, served in World War II; sold to Dominican Republic in 1948 and served as Juan Pablo Duarte (F–102) until she sank in 1957.

== See also ==
- Natchez (boat), civilian vessels named Natchez
