= François-René de Chateaubriand =

French writer, politician and historian (1768–1848)

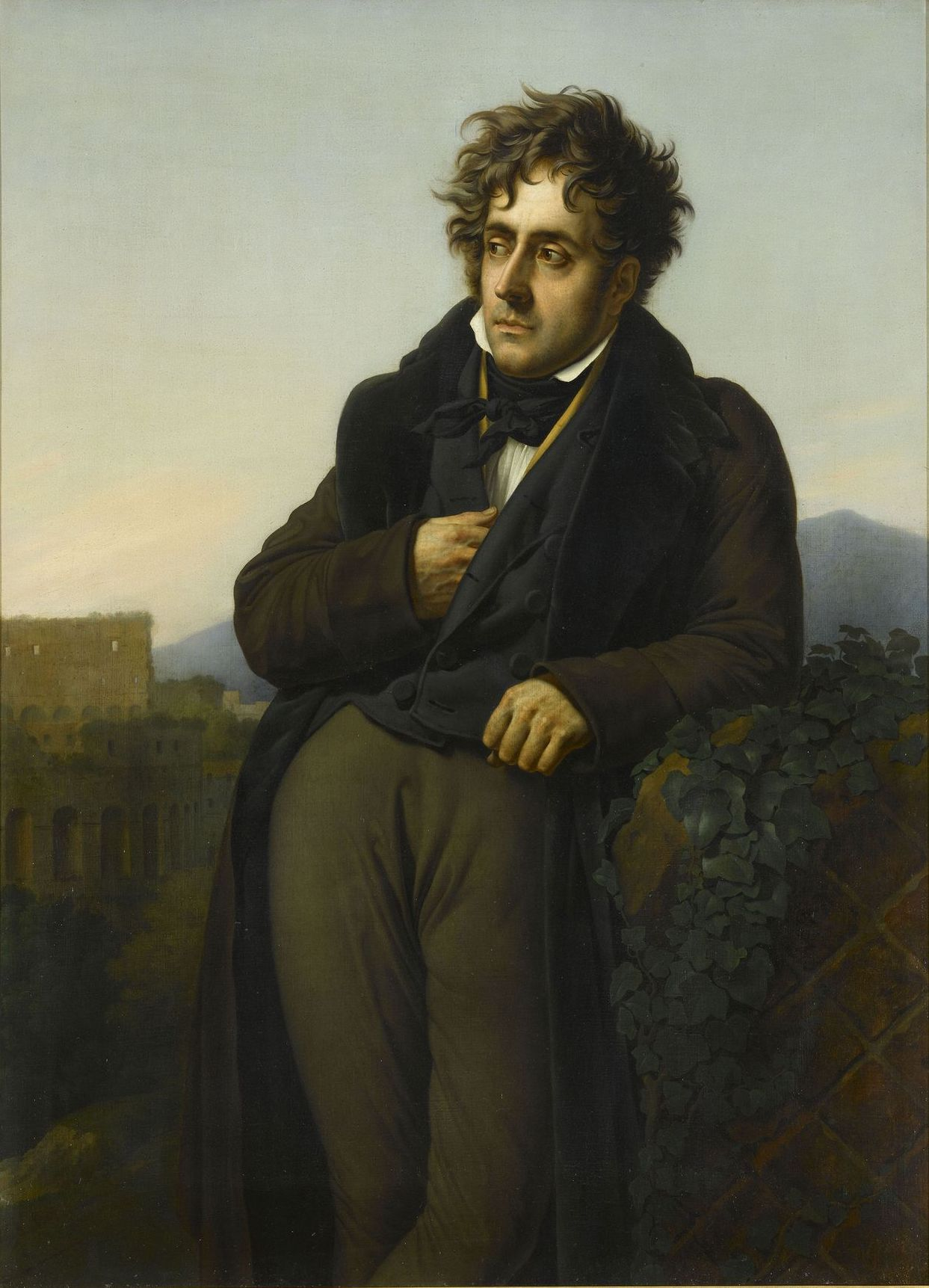
- Portrait of Chateaubriand by Anne-Louis Girodet de Roussy-Trioson, 1809

French Ambassador to the Papal States
- In office 4 January 1828 – 8 August 1829
- Appointed by: Jean-Baptiste de Martignac
- Preceded by: Adrien-Pierre de Montmorency-Laval
- Succeeded by: Auguste de La Ferronays

Minister of Foreign Affairs
- In office 28 December 1822 – 4 August 1824
- Prime Minister: Jean-Baptiste de Villèle
- Preceded by: Mathieu de Montmorency
- Succeeded by: Hyacinthe Maxence de Damas

French Ambassador to the United Kingdom
- In office 22 December 1822 – 28 December 1822
- Appointed by: Jean-Baptiste de Villèle
- Preceded by: Antoine de Gramont
- Succeeded by: Jules de Polignac

French Ambassador to Prussia
- In office 14 December 1821 – 22 December 1822
- Appointed by: Jean-Baptiste de Villèle
- Preceded by: Charles-François de Bonnay
- Succeeded by: Maximilien Gérard de Rayneval

French Ambassador to Sweden
- In office 3 April 1814 – 26 September 1815
- Appointed by: Charles-Maurice de Talleyrand

Member of the Académie française
- In office 1811–1848
- Preceded by: Marie-Joseph Chénier
- Succeeded by: Paul de Noailles

Personal details
- Born: 4 September 1768 Saint-Malo, Brittany, France
- Died: 4 July 1848 (aged 79) Paris, France
- Spouse: Céleste Buisson de la Vigne (m. 1792; died 1847)
- Relatives: Jean-Baptiste de Châteaubriand (brother, 1759 – 1794); Lucile de Chateaubriand (sister, 1764 — 1804)
- Profession: Writer, translator, diplomat
- Awards: Legion of Honour; Order of the Holy Sepulchre; Order of Saint Louis; Order of the Holy Spirit; Order of Saint Michael

Military service
- Allegiance: Kingdom of France
- Branch/service: Armée des Émigrés
- Years of service: 1792
- Rank: Captain
- Battles/wars: French Revolutionary Wars; Siege of Thionville
- Writing career
- Years active: 1793–1848
- Period: 19th century
- Genres: Novel, memoir, essay
- Subjects: Religion, exoticism, existentialism
- Notable works: Atala; Génie du christianisme; René; Mémoires d'Outre-Tombe
- Movements: Romanticism; Conservatism

Signature
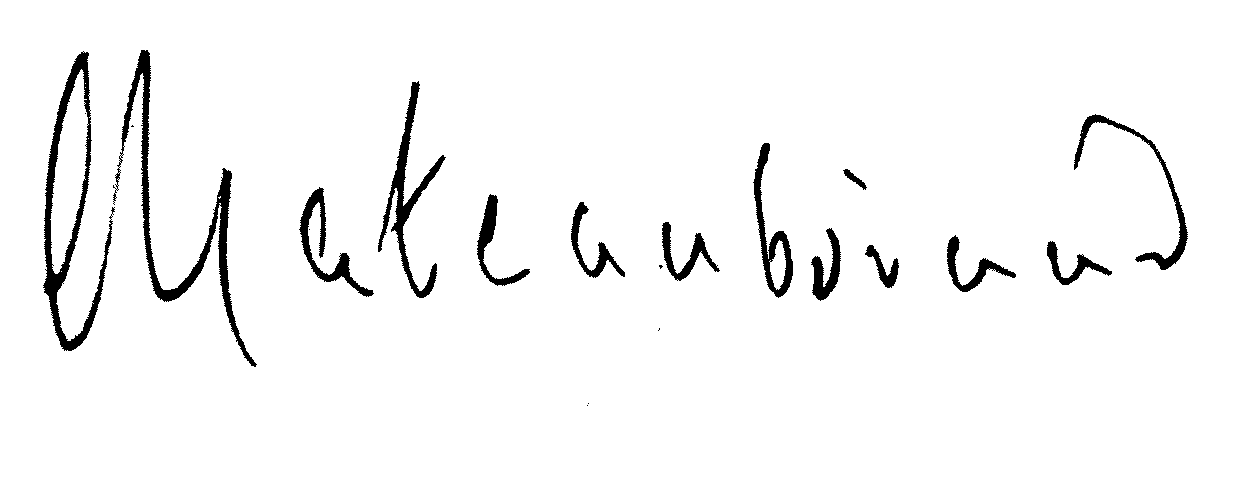

François-René, vicomte de Chateaubriand (Note: English pronunciation: /ʃæˌtoʊbriːˈɑːn/; French pronunciation: [fʁɑ̃swa ʁəne də ʃɑtobʁijɑ̃].) (4 September 1768 – 4 July 1848) was a French writer, politician, diplomat and historian who influenced French literature of the 19th century. Descended from an old aristocratic family from Brittany, Chateaubriand was a royalist. He served as Minister of Foreign Affairs from 1822 to 1824 and as the French ambassador to Sweden, Prussia, the United Kingdom, and the Papal States.

In an age when large numbers of intellectuals turned against the Church, Chateaubriand authored Génie du christianisme (The Genius of Christianity) in defense of the Catholic faith. His works include the autobiography Mémoires d'Outre-Tombe (Memoirs from Beyond the Grave), published posthumously in 1849–1850, now widely regarded as one of the most important works in French literature. In 1811 he was made a member of the Académie Française. Historian Peter Gay said that Chateaubriand saw himself as the greatest lover, the greatest writer, and the greatest philosopher of his age. Gay states that Chateaubriand "dominated the literary scene in France in the first half of the nineteenth century".

== Biography ==
=== Early years and exile ===
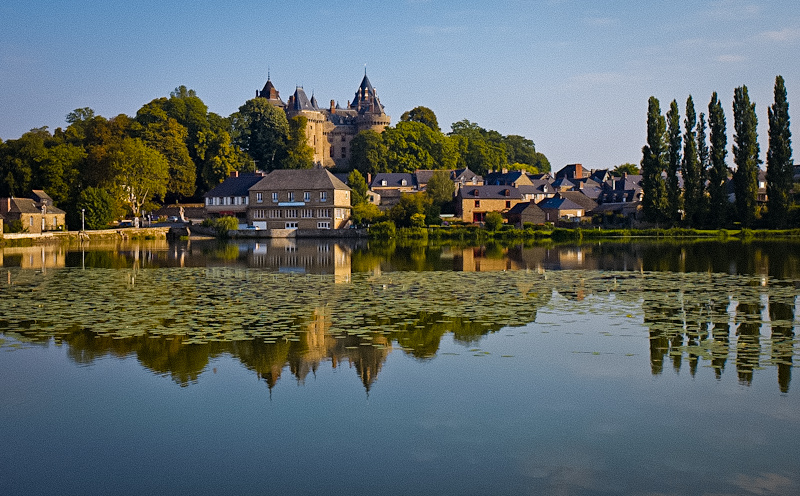
The Château de Combourg, where Chateaubriand spent his childhood

Born in Saint-Malo on 4 September 1768, the last of ten children, Chateaubriand grew up at his family's castle (the château de Combourg) in Combourg, Brittany. His father, René de Chateaubriand, was a sea captain turned ship-owner and slave trader. His mother's maiden name was Apolline de Bedée. Chateaubriand's father was a morose, uncommunicative man, and the young Chateaubriand grew up in an atmosphere of gloomy solitude, only broken by long walks in the Breton countryside and an intense friendship with his sister Lucile. His youthful solitude and wild desire produced a suicide attempt with a hunting rifle, although the weapon failed to discharge.

English agriculturist and pioneering travel writer Arthur Young visited Comburg in 1788 and he described the immediate environs of the "romantic" Chateau de Combourg thusly:

"SEPTEMBER 1st. To Combourg, the country has a savage aspect; husbandry not much further advanced, at least in skill, than among the Hurons, which appears incredible amidst inclosures; the people almost as wild as their country, and their town of Combourg one of the most brutal filthy places that can be seen; mud houses, no windows, and a pavement so broken, as to impede all passengers, but ease none - yet here is a chateau, and inhabited; who is this Mons. de Chateaubriant, the owner, that has nerves strung for a residence amidst such filth and poverty? Below this hideous heap of wretchedness is a fine lake..."

Chateaubriand was educated in Dol, Rennes and Dinan. For a time he could not make up his mind whether he wanted to be a naval officer or a priest, but at the age of seventeen, he decided on a military career and gained a commission as a second lieutenant in the French Army based at Navarre. Within two years, he had been promoted to the rank of captain. He visited Paris in 1788 where he made the acquaintance of Jean-François de La Harpe, André Chénier, Louis-Marcelin de Fontanes and other leading writers of the time. When the French Revolution broke out, Chateaubriand was initially sympathetic, but as events in Paris and throughout the countryside became increasingly violent, he decided to journey to North America in 1791. He was given the idea to leave Europe by Guillaume-Chrétien de Lamoignon de Malesherbes, who also encouraged him to do some botanical studies.

=== Journey to America ===
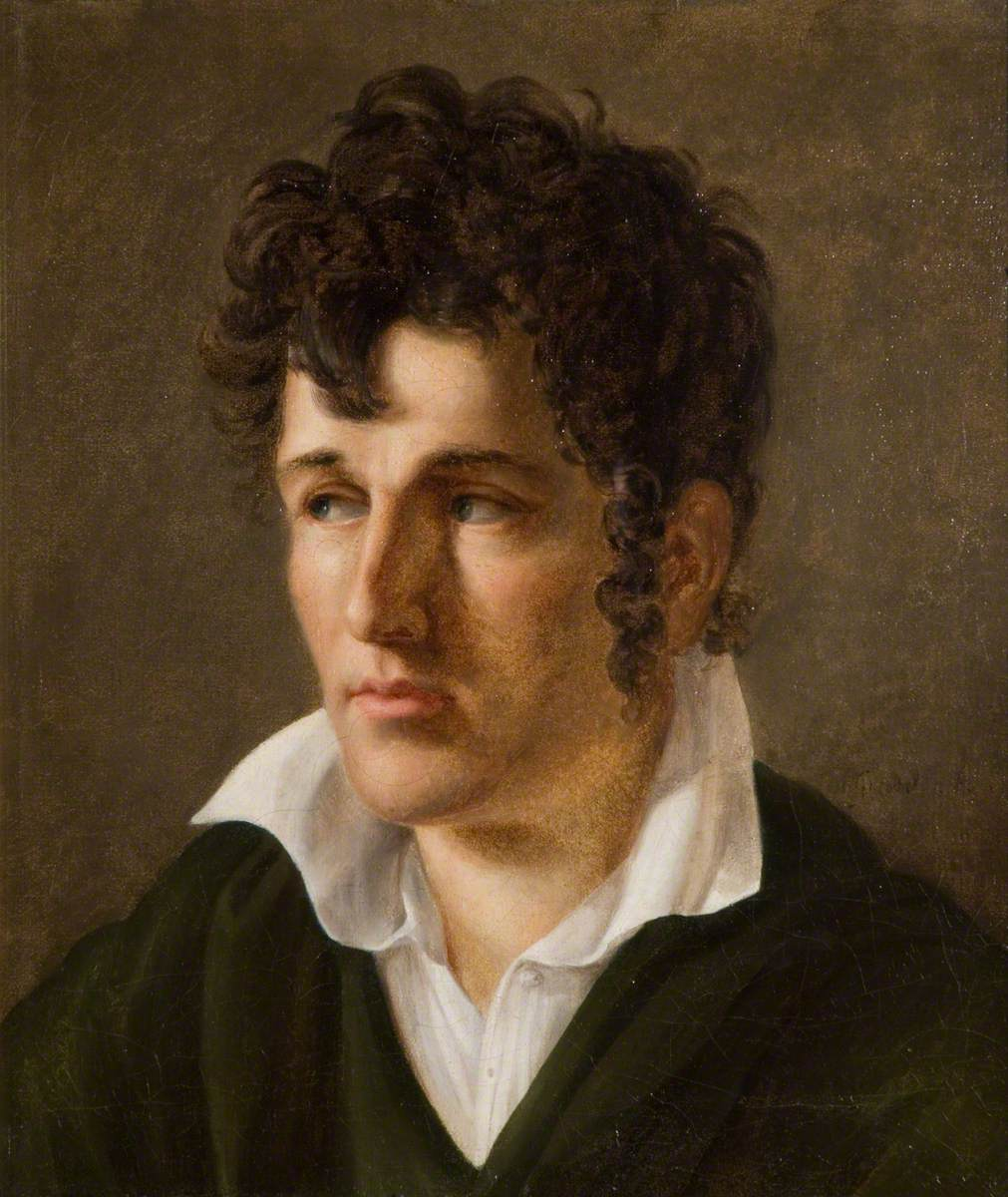
Young Chateaubriand, by Anne-Louis Girodet (c. 1790)

In Voyage en Amérique, published in 1826, Chateaubriand writes that he arrived in Philadelphia on 10 July 1791. He visited New York, Boston and Lexington, before leaving by boat on the Hudson River to reach Albany. He then followed the Mohawk Trail up the Niagara Falls where he broke his arm and spent a month in recovery in the company of a Native American tribe. Chateaubriand then describes Native American tribes' customs, as well as zoological, political and economic consideration. He then says that a raid along the Ohio River, the Mississippi River, Louisiana and Florida took him back to Philadelphia, where he embarked on the Molly in November to go back to France.

This experience provided the setting for his exotic novels Les Natchez (written between 1793 and 1799 but published only in 1826), Atala (1801) and René (1802). His vivid, captivating descriptions of nature in the sparsely settled American Deep South were written in a style that was very innovative for the time and spearheaded what later became the Romantic movement in France. As early as 1916, some scholars have cast doubt on Chateaubriand's claims that he was granted an interview with George Washington and that he actually lived for a time with the Native Americans he wrote about. Entire sections of Chateaubriand's claimed travels were fictitious – most notoriously his passage through the Mississippi Valley, which he writes of as inhabited by monkeys.

=== Return to France ===
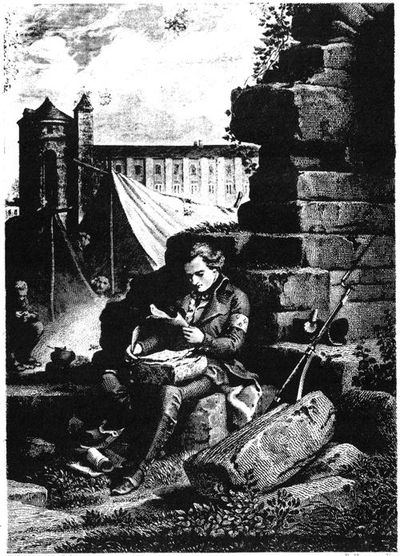
Chateaubriand in the army of Condé

Chateaubriand returned to France in 1792 and subsequently joined the army of Royalist émigrés in Koblenz under the leadership of Louis Joseph de Bourbon, Prince of Condé. Under strong pressure from his family, he married a young aristocratic woman, also from Saint-Malo, whom he had never previously met, Céleste Buisson de la Vigne (in later life, Chateaubriand was notoriously unfaithful to her, having a series of love affairs). His military career came to an end when he was wounded at the Siege of Thionville, a major clash between Royalist troops (of which Chateaubriand was a member) and the French Revolutionary Army. Half-dead, he was taken to Jersey and exiled to England, leaving his wife behind.

=== Exile in London ===
Chateaubriand spent most of his exile in poverty in London, scraping a living offering French lessons and doing translation work, but he also worked as a French teacher in Beccles in Suffolk. While he was in Suffolk he fell in love with Charlotte Ives, the daughter of a clergyman living in Bungay, but the romance ended when he was forced to reveal he was already married. During his time in Britain, Chateaubriand also became familiar with English literature. This reading, particularly of John Milton's Paradise Lost (which he later translated into French prose), had a deep influence on his own literary work.

His exile forced Chateaubriand to examine the causes of the French Revolution, which had cost the lives of many of his family and friends; these reflections inspired his first work, Essai sur les Révolutions (1797). An attempt in 18th-century style to explain the French Revolution, it predated his subsequent, romantic style of writing and was largely ignored. A major turning point in Chateaubriand's life was his conversion back to the Catholic faith of his childhood around 1798.

=== Consulate and Empire ===
Chateaubriand took advantage of the amnesty issued to émigrés to return to France in May 1800 (under the French Consulate); he edited the Mercure de France. In 1802, he won fame with Génie du christianisme ("The Genius of Christianity"), an apologia for the Catholic faith which contributed to the post-revolutionary religious revival in France. It also won him the favour of Napoleon Bonaparte, who was eager to win over the Catholic Church at the time.

James McMillan argues that a Europe-wide Catholic Revival emerged from the change in the cultural climate from intellectually-oriented classicism to emotionally-based Romanticism. He concludes that Chateaubriand's book:

did more than any other single work to restore the credibility and prestige of Christianity in intellectual circles and launched a fashionable rediscovery of the Middle Ages and their Christian civilisation. The revival was by no means confined to an intellectual elite, however, but was evident in the real, though uneven, rechristianisation of the French countryside.

Appointed secretary of the legation to the Holy See by Napoleon, he accompanied Cardinal Fesch to Rome. But the two men soon quarrelled, and Chateaubriand was appointed minister to the Republic of Valais in November 1803. He resigned his post in disgust after Napoleon ordered the execution in 1804 of Louis XVI's cousin, Louis Antoine, Duke of Enghien. Chateaubriand was, after his resignation, completely dependent on his literary efforts. However, and quite unexpectedly, he received a large sum of money from the Russian Tsarina Elizabeth Alexeievna. She had seen him as a defender of Christianity and thus worthy of her royal support.

Chateaubriand used his new-found wealth in 1806 to visit Greece, Asia Minor, the Ottoman Empire, Egypt, Tunisia, and Spain. The notes he made on his travels later formed part of a prose epic, Les Martyrs, set during the Roman persecution of early Christianity. His notes also furnished a running account of the trip itself, published in 1811 as the Itinéraire de Paris à Jérusalem (Itinerary from Paris to Jerusalem). The Spanish stage of the journey inspired a third novella, Les aventures du dernier Abencérage (The Adventures of the Last Abencerrage), which appeared in 1826.

On his return to France at the end of 1806, he published a severe criticism of Napoleon, comparing him to Nero and predicting the emergence of a new Tacitus. Napoleon famously threatened to have Chateaubriand sabred on the steps of the Tuileries Palace for it, but settled for merely banishing him from the city. Chateaubriand therefore retired, in 1807, to a modest estate he called Vallée-aux-Loups ("Wolf Valley"), in Châtenay-Malabry, 11 km (6.8 mi) south of central Paris, where he lived until 1817. Here he finished Les Martyrs, which appeared in 1809, and began the first drafts of his Mémoires d’Outre-Tombe. He was elected to the Académie française in 1811, but, given his plan to infuse his acceptance speech with criticism of the Revolution, he could not occupy his seat until after the Bourbon Restoration. His literary friends during this period included Madame de Staël, Joseph Joubert, and Pierre-Simon Ballanche.

=== Under the Restoration ===
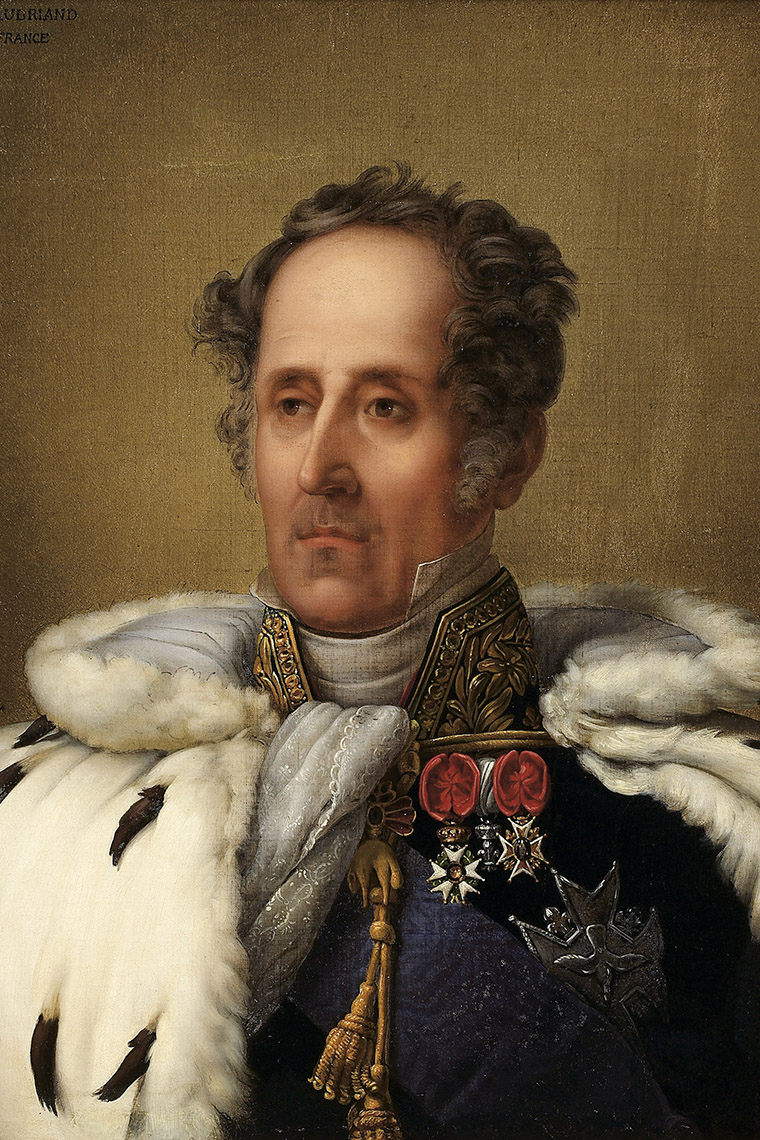
Chateaubriand as a Peer of France (1828)

Chateaubriand became a major figure in politics as well as literature. At first he was a strong Royalist in the period up to 1824. His liberal phase lasted from 1824 to 1830. After that he was much less active. After the fall of Napoleon, Chateaubriand rallied to the Bourbons. On 30 March 1814, he wrote a pamphlet against Napoleon, titled De Buonaparte et des Bourbons, of which thousands of copies were published. He then followed Louis XVIII into exile to Ghent during the Hundred Days (March–July 1815), and was nominated ambassador to Sweden.

After Napoleon's final defeat in the Battle of Waterloo (of which he heard the distant cannon rumblings outside Ghent), Chateaubriand became peer of France and state minister (1815). In December 1815 he voted for Marshal Ney's execution. However, his criticism of Louis XVIII in La Monarchie selon la Charte, after the Chambre introuvable was dissolved, resulted in his disgrace. He lost his function of state minister, and joined the opposition, siding with the Ultra-royalist group supporting the future Charles X, and becoming one of the main writers of its mouthpiece, Le Conservateur.

Chateaubriand sided again with the Court after the murder of the Duc de Berry (1820), writing for the occasion the Mémoires sur la vie et la mort du duc. He then served as ambassador to Prussia (1821) and the United Kingdom (1822), and even rose to the office of Minister of Foreign Affairs (28 December 1822 – 4 August 1824). A plenipotentiary to the Congress of Verona (1822), he decided in favor of the Quintuple Alliance's intervention in Spain during the Trienio Liberal, despite opposition from the Duke of Wellington. Chateaubriand was soon relieved of his office by Prime Minister Joseph de Villèle on 5 June 1824, over his objections to a law the latter proposed that would have resulted in the widening of the electorate. Chateaubriand was subsequently appointed French ambassador to Genoa.

Consequently, he moved towards the liberal opposition, both as a Peer and as a contributor to Journal des Débats (his articles there gave the signal of the paper's similar switch, which, however, was more moderate than Le National, directed by Adolphe Thiers and Armand Carrel). Opposing Villèle, he became highly popular as a defender of press freedom and the cause of Greek independence. After Villèle's downfall, Charles X appointed Chateaubriand ambassador to the Holy See in 1828, but he resigned upon the accession of the Prince de Polignac as premier (November 1829). In 1830, he donated a monument to the French painter Nicolas Poussin in the church of San Lorenzo in Lucina in Rome.

=== July Monarchy ===
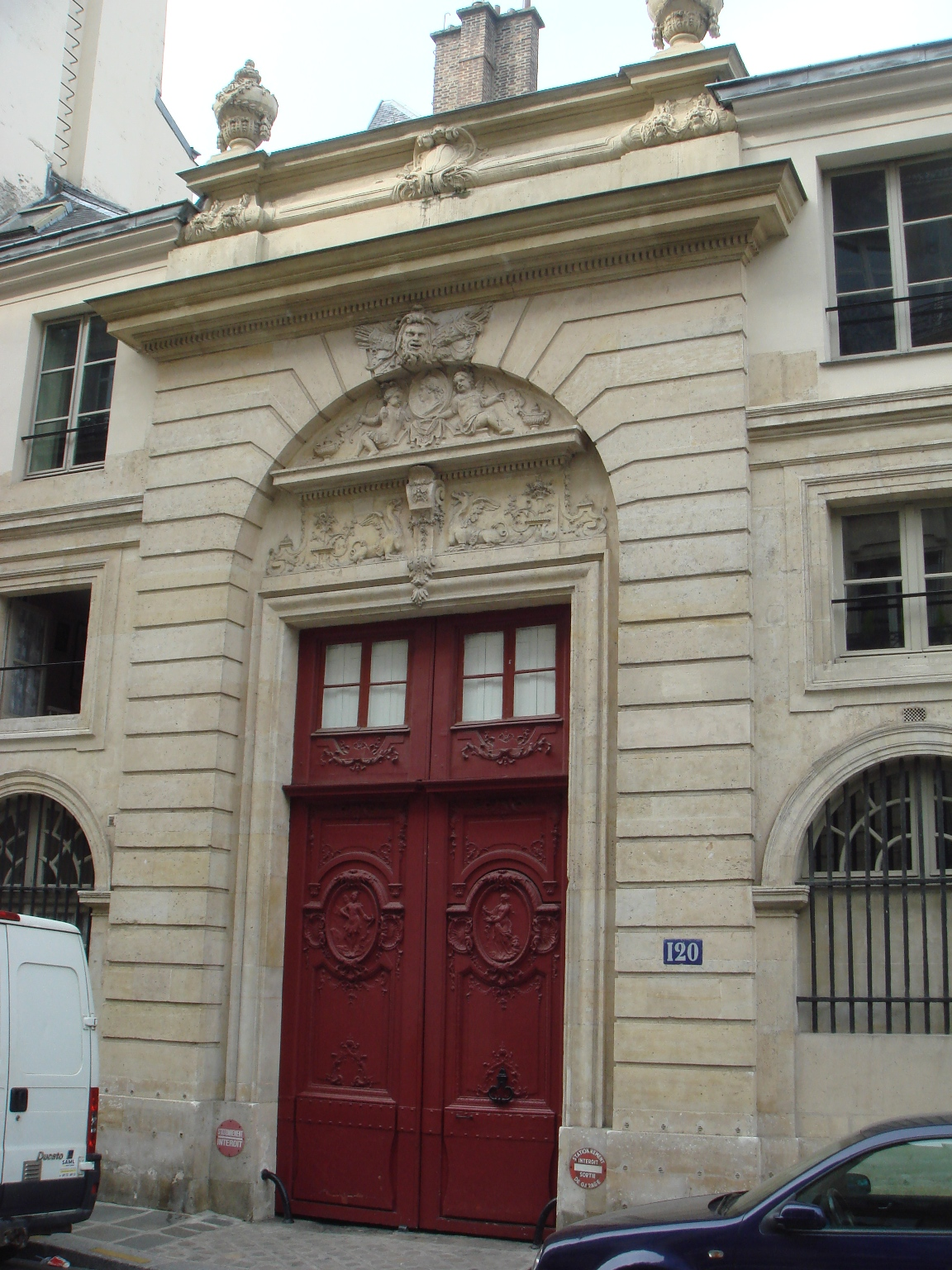
His last home, 120 rue du Bac, where Chateaubriand had an apartment on the ground floor

In 1830, after the July Revolution, his refusal to swear allegiance to the new House of Orléans king Louis-Philippe put an end to his political career. He withdrew from political life to write his Mémoires d'Outre-Tombe ("Memoirs from Beyond the Grave"), published posthumously in two volumes in 1849–1850. It reflects his growing pessimism regarding the future. Although his contemporaries celebrated the present and future as an extension of the past, Chateaubriand and the new Romanticists couldn't share their nostalgic outlook. Instead he foresaw chaos, discontinuity, and disaster. His diaries and letters often focused on the upheavals he could see every day — abuses of power, excesses of daily life, and disasters yet to come. His melancholy tone suggested astonishment, surrender, betrayal, and bitterness.

His Études historiques was an introduction to a projected History of France. He became a harsh critic of the "bourgeois king" Louis-Philippe and the July Monarchy, and his planned volume on the arrest of Marie-Caroline, duchesse de Berry caused him to be (unsuccessfully) prosecuted.

Chateaubriand, along with other Catholic traditionalists such as Ballanche or, on the other side of the political divide, the socialist and republican Pierre Leroux, was one of the few men of his time who attempted to conciliate the three terms of Liberté, égalité and fraternité, going beyond the antagonism between liberals and socialists as to what interpretation to give the seemingly contradictory terms. Chateaubriand thus gave a Christian interpretation of the revolutionary motto, stating in the 1841 conclusion to his Mémoires d'Outre-Tombe:

Far from being at its term, the religion of the Liberator is now only just entering its third phase, the political period, liberty, equality, fraternity.

In his final years, he lived as a recluse in an apartment at 120 rue du Bac, Paris, leaving his house only to pay visits to Juliette Récamier in Abbaye-aux-Bois. His final work, Vie de Rancé, was written at the suggestion of his confessor and published in 1844. It is a biography of Armand Jean le Bouthillier de Rancé, a worldly seventeenth-century French aristocrat who withdrew from society to become the founder of the Trappist order of monks. The parallels with Chateaubriand's own life are striking. As late as 1845–1847, he also kept revising Mémoires d'Outre-Tombe, particularly the earlier sections, as evidenced by the revision dates on the manuscript.

Chateaubriand died in Paris on 4 July 1848, aged 79, in the midst of the Revolution of 1848, in the arms of his dear friend Juliette Récamier, and was buried, as he had requested, on the tidal island Grand Bé near Saint-Malo, accessible only when the tide is out.

== Influence ==
Chateaubriand's descriptions of Nature and his analysis of emotion made him the model for a generation of Romantic writers, not only in France but also abroad. For example, Lord Byron was deeply impressed by René. The young Victor Hugo scribbled in a notebook, "To be Chateaubriand or nothing." Even his enemies found it hard to avoid his influence. Stendhal, who despised him for political reasons, made use of his psychological analyses in his own book De l'amour.

Chateaubriand was the first to define the vague des passions ("intimations of passion") that later became a commonplace of Romanticism: "One inhabits, with a full heart, an empty world" (Génie du Christianisme). His political thought and actions seem to offer numerous contradictions: he wanted to be the friend both of legitimist royalty and of republicans, alternately defending whichever of the two seemed more in danger: "I am a Bourbonist out of honour, a monarchist out of reason, and a republican out of taste and temperament". He was the first of a series of French men of letters (Lamartine, Victor Hugo, André Malraux, Paul Claudel) who tried to mix political and literary careers.

"We are convinced that the great writers have told their own story in their works", wrote Chateaubriand in Génie du christianisme. "One only truly describes one's own heart by attributing it to another, and the greater part of genius is composed of memories". This is certainly true of Chateaubriand himself. All his works have strong autobiographical elements, overt or disguised. George Brandes, in 1901, compared the works of Chateaubriand to those of Rousseau and others:

The year 1800 was the first to produce a book bearing the imprint of the new era, a work small in size, but great in significance and mighty in the impression it made. Atala took the French public by storm in a way which no book had done since the days of Paul and Virginia. It was a romance of the plains and mysterious forests of North America, with a strong, strange aroma of the untilled soil from which it sprang; it glowed with rich foreign colouring, and with the fiercer glow of consuming passion.

Chateaubriand was a food enthusiast; Chateaubriand steak is most likely to have been named after him.

== Honors and memberships ==
In 1806, Chateaubriand was invested as a Knight of the Equestrian Order of the Holy Sepulchre of Jerusalem during a pilgrimage to the Holy Land. Chateaubriand was elected a member of the American Antiquarian Society in 1816. A French school in Rome is named after him.

== Works ==
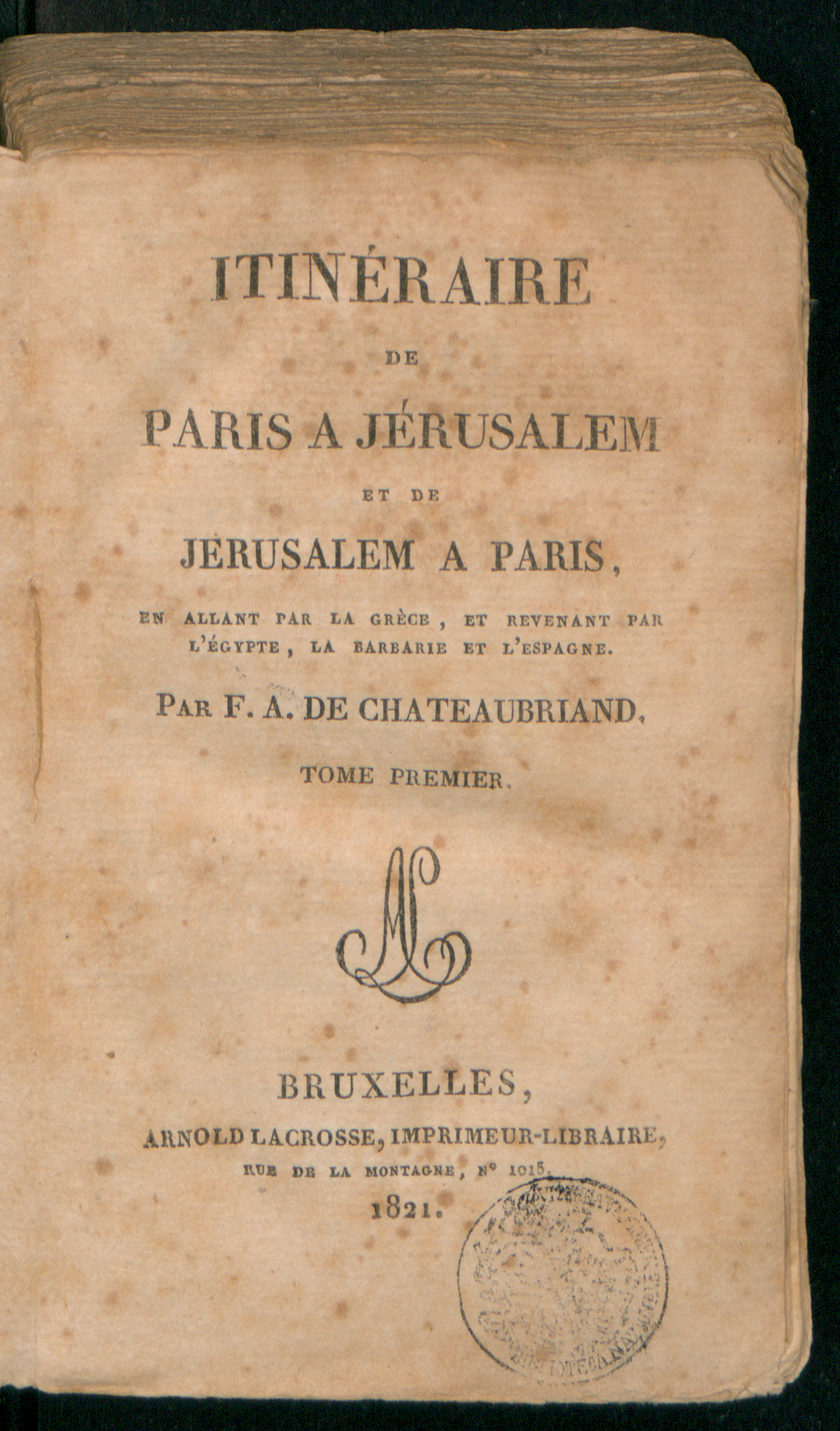
Itinéraire de Paris à Jérusalem et de Jérusalem à Paris, 1821

- 1797: Essai sur les révolutions.
- 1801: Atala, ou Les Amours de Deux Sauvages dans le Desert.
- 1802: René.
- 1802: Génie du christianisme.
- 1809: Les Martyrs.
- 1811: Itinéraire de Paris à Jérusalem. English translation by Frederic Shoberl, 1814. Travels in Greece, Palestine, Egypt, and Barbary, during the years 1806 and 1807.
- 1814: "On Buonaparte and the Bourbons", in Blum, Christopher Olaf, editor and translator, 2004. Critics of the Enlightenment. Wilmington, DE: ISI Books. 3–42.
- 1820: Mémoires sur la vie et la mort du duc de Berry.
- 1825: Note sur la Grèce.
- 1826: Les Natchez.
- 1826: Les Aventures du dernier Abencérage.
- 1827: Voyage en Amérique.
- 1831: Études historiques.
- 1833: Mémoires sur la captivité de Madame la duchesse de Berry.
- 1844: La Vie de Rancé.
- 1848–50: Mémoires d'Outre-Tombe.
  - "Progress," in Menczer, Béla, 1962. Catholic Political Thought, 1789–1848, University of Notre Dame Press.

=== Digitized works ===
- [Opere]. 1.
- Génie du Cristianisme.
- [Opere]. 2.
- Itinéraire de Paris a Jérusalem et de Jérusalem a Paris.
- Martyrs.
- Voyage en Amérique.
- Mélanges politiques.
- Polémique.
- Études historiques.
- Analyse raisonnée de l'histoire de la France.
- Paradise lost.
- Congrès de Verone.
- Mémoires d'outre-tombe. 1.
- Mémoires d'outre-tombe. 2.
- Mémoires d'outre-tombe. 3.
- Mémoires d'outre-tombe. 4.
- Mémoires d'outre-tombe. 5.
- Mémoires d'outre-tombe. 6.
- Dernières années de Chateaubriand.

== See also ==
- Chateaubriand steak
- Viscountcy of Chateaubriand (cr. 1817)
- List of Ambassadors of France to the United Kingdom
