= Les Natchez =

Romance by François-René de Chateaubriand

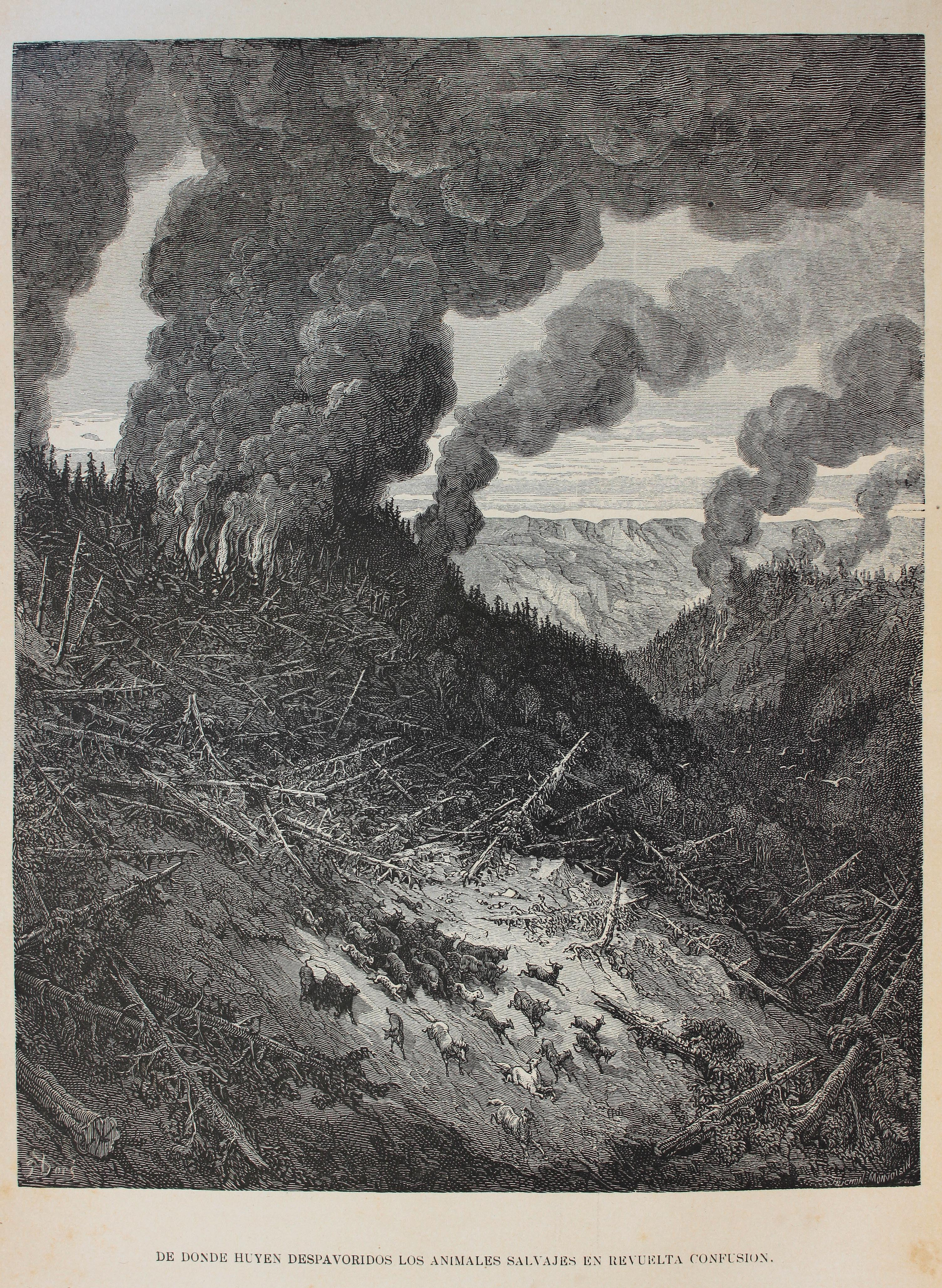
1880 illustration by Gustave Doré from a Spanish edition of Les Natchez

Les Natchez is a romance written by François-René de Chateaubriand, during his exile in England, and printed in 1825–1826. Its subject is the Natchez people, and it contains the author's impressions of America and views of life.

Two excerpts from this work were published previously, as the novellas René in 1802 and Atala in 1801.
