= Breeches =

Clothing with coverings for each leg

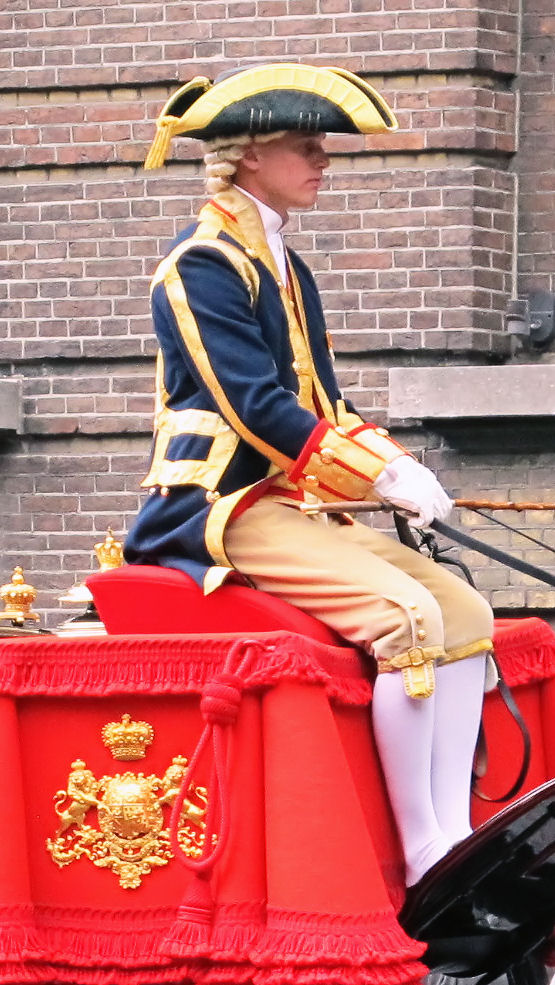
Breeches are still worn as livery for special occasions in several European courts. Here, a coachman in the Netherlands wears them during Prinsjesdag, 2013.

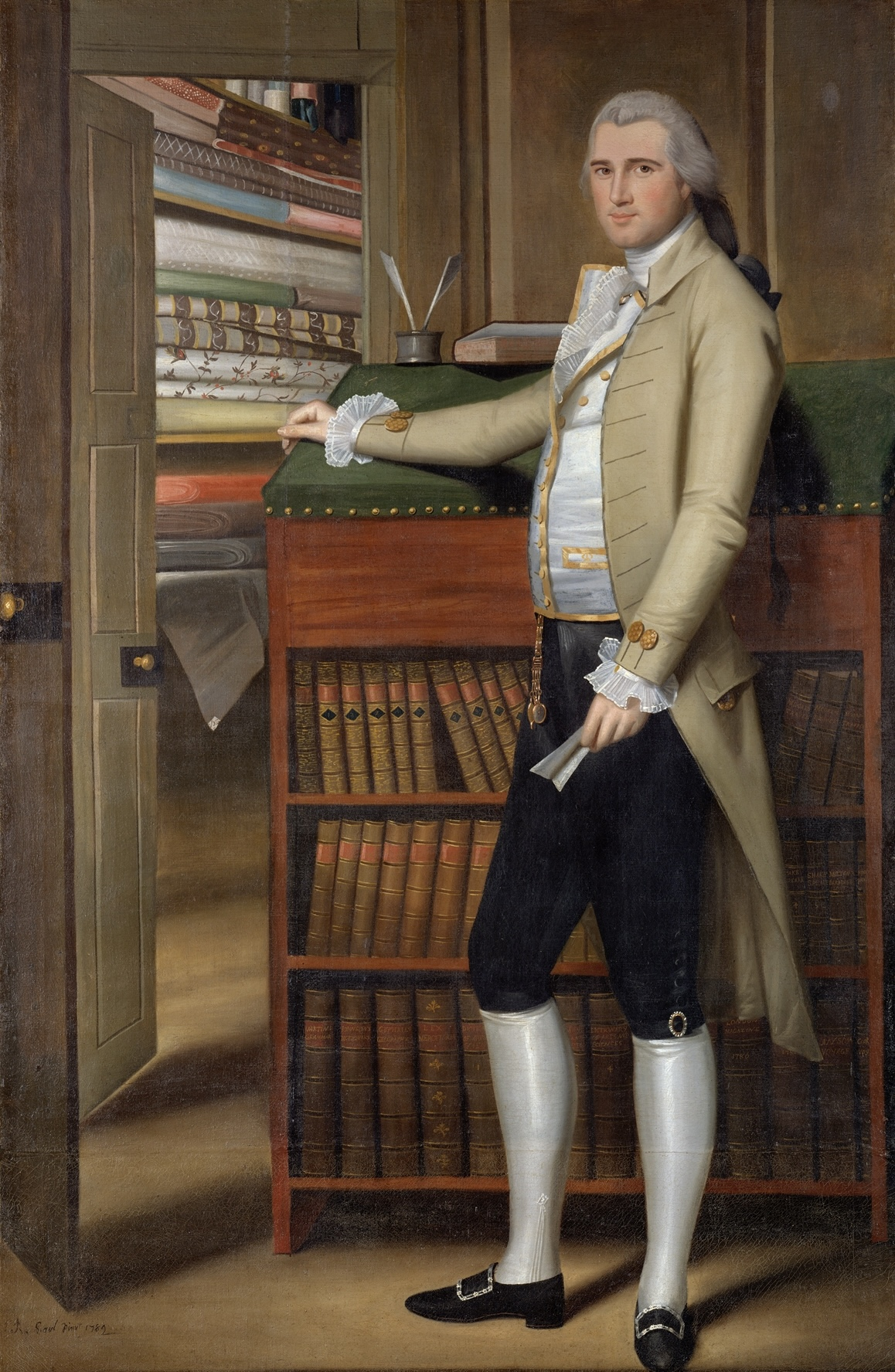
Breeches as worn in the United States in the late 18th century: Elijah Boardman by Ralph Earl, c. 1789

Breeches or britches (/ˈbrɪtʃɪz, ˈbriː-/ BRITCH-iz, BREE-chiz) are an article of clothing covering the body from the waist down, with separate coverings for each leg, usually stopping just below the knee, though in some cases reaching to the ankles. Formerly a standard item of Western men's clothing, they had fallen out of use by the mid-19th century in favour of trousers.

Breeches became popular in the 16th century and continued to evolve in style and construction over the following centuries. By the early 19th century, however, they had largely disappeared from everyday men's fashion, giving way to longer trousers. Although breeches went out of general use, they continued to be worn for specialized purposes such as horseback riding, ceremonial uniforms and within historical and fashion communities.

Modern athletic garments used for English riding and fencing, although called breeches or britches, differ from breeches.

== Etymology ==
Breeches is a double plural known since c. 1205, from Old English brēc, the plural of brōc "garment for the legs and trunk", from the Indo-European root *bʰreg- "break", here apparently used in the sense "divide", "separate", as in Scottish Gaelic briogais ("trousers"), in Breton bragoù ("pants"), in Irish bríste ("trousers") and brycan or brogau in Welsh. Cognate with the Proto-Germanic word *brōk-, plural *brōkiz, itself most likely from the Proto-Indo-European root; whence also the Old Norse word brók, which shows up in the epithet of the Viking king Ragnar Loðbrók, Ragnar "Hairy-breeches".

Like other words for similar garments (e.g., pants, knickers, and shorts) the word breeches has been applied to both outer garments and undergarments. Breeches uses a plural form to reflect it has two legs; the word has no singular form (it is a plurale tantum). This construction is common in English and Italian (brache, plural of the never-used braca), but is no longer common in some other languages in which it was once common; e.g., the parallel modern Dutch: broek.

At first breeches indicated a cloth worn as underwear by both men and women. Philip Stanhope, 4th Earl of Chesterfield, uses the word breech as a synonym or perhaps a euphemism for anus in his letters.

In the latter 16th century, breeches began to replace hose (while the German Hosen, also a plural, ousted Bruch) as the general English term for men's lower outer garments, a usage that remained standard until knee-length breeches were replaced for everyday wear by long pantaloons or trousers. The difference was that hose were in principle separate garments for each leg, requiring the tunic or a cod-piece to cover the private parts; whereas breeches were sewn together as a single all-enveloping garment.

Until around the end of the 19th century (but later in some places), small boys wore special forms of dresses until they were "breeched", or given the adult male styles of clothes, at about the age of six to eight (the age fell slowly to perhaps three). Male and female children's styles were distinguished by chest and collar, as well as other aspects of attire, such as hairstyle.

During the French Revolution, breeches (culottes in French) were seen as a symbol of the nobility and more prosperous members of the bourgeoisie (including professionals such as lawyers, bankers, and physicians). Lower-class revolutionaries became known as sans-culottes ("without breeches"), as they could not afford breeches and wore pantaloons or trousers instead.

=== Britches ===
The spelling britches is a spelling variant, not a corruption, dating from the 17th century. Currently, britches reflects a common pronunciation often used in casual speech to mean trousers or pants in many English-speaking parts of the world. Breeks is a Scots or northern English spelling and pronunciation.

=== Breech ===
The singular form of the word has survived in the sense of the part of the body covered by breeches, (i.e., posterior, buttocks); paradoxically, the alliterative expression "bare breech" thus means without any inner or outer breeches.

This also led to the following words:

- a (gun) breech is the part of a firearm behind the bore (since 1575 in gunnery).
- breech birth in childbirth (since 1673).

== Types ==
A pair of buckles for dress breeches. The T-hook of the buckle is inserted into a buttonhole on the strap at the bottoms of the leg of the breeches. The end of the strap is slipped through, the prongs lowered and then the end slipped through the other side of the buckle.

The terms breeches or knee-breeches specifically designate the knee-length garments worn by men from the later 16th century to the early 19th century. After that, they survived in England only in very formal wear, such as the livery worn by some servants into the early 20th century, and the court dress worn by others, such as King's Counsel, down to the present day on formal occasions.

- Spanish breeches, stiff, ungathered breeches popular from the 1630s until the 1650s.
- Petticoat breeches, very full, ungathered breeches popular from the 1650s until the early 1660s, giving the impression of a woman's petticoat.
- Rhinegraves, full, gathered breeches popular from the early 1660s until the mid-1670s, often worn with an overskirt over them.
- Fall front breeches, breeches with a panel or flap covering the front opening and fastened up with buttons at either corner.
- Dress breeches are tight-fitting and have buttons and a strap and buckle (which are detachable) closure at the bottoms, made of velvet or barathea wool, used for livery, formal and court dress.
- From the 1890s to the 1930s a form of breeches called knickerbockers or knickers (US) were in fashion with both men and boys. Like their 18th century predecessor, they reached and were fastened just below the knees, but the thighs were more loosely worn. There were various versions including "plus fours" for golf wear which reached down a further four inches below the knees, or "plus twos" that reached down only two inches, often used as apparel for the sport of bird-shooting, especially in Britain.
- Vráka (Greek: βράκα) are the traditional breeches of the islands of Greece from the westernmost Ionian Islands to the easternmost, Cyprus, and the southern coast of the Peloponnese. Greek breeches are extremely roomy and are meant to be tucked inside tall boots just below the knee. They were originally meant to facilitate movement on fishing boats and sailing ships.

They are usually accompanied by a long, wide piece of cloth turned many times around the natural waist as a belt. As the vráka lack pockets, items (such as money) are stored inside the folds of this belt. Vrákes are usually made of sturdy cotton double cloth, usually dark blue or black, with brighter color cloth used as the belt. They were usually worn with white, long-sleeved shirts and a roomy waistcoat.

In Cyprus, the vráka was originally made of white material which was then sent to a dyer known as a poyatzyis (πογιατζιής in Cypriot Greek, related Standard Modern Greek μπογιάτζης, "painter", but semantically βαφέας, vaféas) to garment dye the vrákes after making-up.

In contrast to its present-day use, black-coloured vrákes in Cyprus were worn as a formal dress in events such as weddings or for going to church on Sunday, whereas the everyday vráka that Cypriot men wore were of thin blue or white cloth in the summer, and thicker dark blue cloth (similar to the Cretan blue vráka) in the winter. In the hills, Cypriot men wore shorter vrákes in order to make their work easier and wore frangopodínes (φραγκοποδίνες, "Frankish boots", i.e. boots in a Western European style), a knee-length boot. In large cities of Cyprus, the vráka was always black.

- Breeches (Yiddish: האלבע-הויזן, romanized: halbeh hoizen, lit. 'half-pants') are still worn by many Hasidic men, particularly those of Galician or Hungarian origin, such as Satmar and Sanz
- In the 18th and 19th centuries, the term breech-cloth or breech-clout was also used to describe the apron-like loincloths worn by some Indigenous peoples of the Americas.
- In the Book of Exodus, the kohanim (priests) were commanded to wear white linen breeches, the priestly undergarments.

=== Riding breeches ===
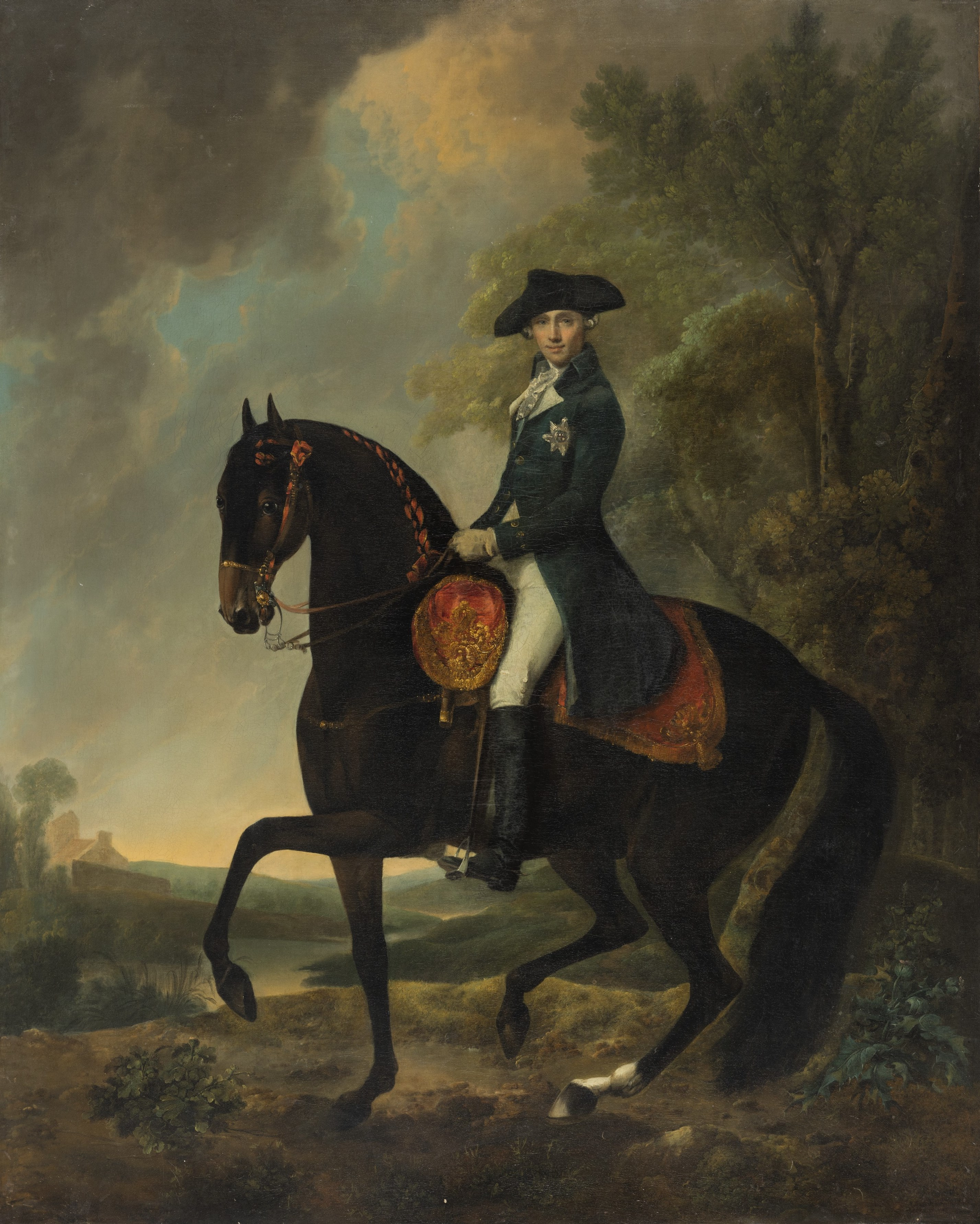
Equestrian portrait of Prince Henry, Duke of Cumberland and Strathearn by David Morier around 1765.

Riding breeches are specifically designed for equestrian activities. Traditionally, they were tight in the legs, stopping about halfway down the calf, with buttons or laces in the calf section, and had a pronounced flare through the thighs that allowed freedom of movement for the rider. Before the invention of the fly front, they were made with flaps, 5 inches (13 cm) to 8 inches (20 cm) wide, called falls.

However, with the advent of modern stretch materials such as spandex, many modern breeches have no flare and fit skin-tight. In some cases, zippers and velcro fastenings have replaced laces and buttons at the calves as well. The flared style is seen at times, and is available to cavalry and other historic reenactors.

There are four main types of riding breeches:

Knee-patch breeches
Breeches that stop mid-calf, designed to be worn with tall boots, which come up to the knee, or with half chaps and short paddock boots. They have grippy material, usually suede leather or a "grippy" synthetic, only on the inside of the knee area. These are the only type of breeches worn by hunt seat riders. Show jumpers, eventers, show hunters, as well as some endurance riders, and pleasure riders also often use the breeches.
Full seat breeches
Breeches with suede or another grippy material from the knee, up the inner thigh, and across the buttocks. These breeches are primarily seen in dressage competition, where the "sticky" seat helps riders stay quiet and deep in the saddle as they sit the gaits of their horses. However, they are also worn by eventers and other riders. They are designed to be worn with tall boots or half chaps.
Jockeys' breeches
Also known as silks, jockeys' breeches are made from a white lightweight fabric, usually nylon and typically have elasticised lower legs. Some racing authorities have regulations that require a jockey's name to be inscribed along the thigh of the breeches.
Jodhpur breeches

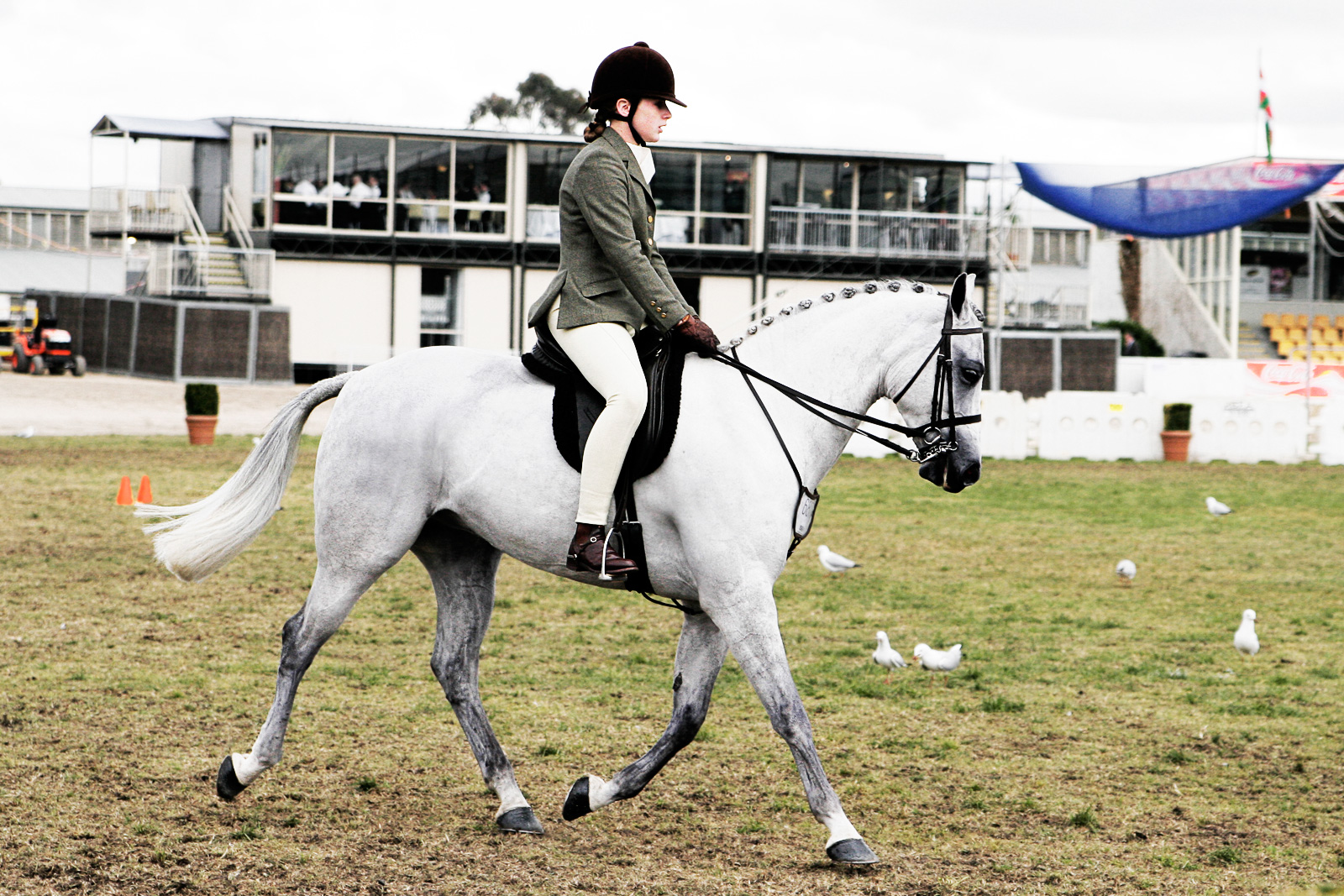
2005 Melbourne show competitor in jodhpurs.

These breeches, which are also called jodhpurs, are a type of riding pants with legs extending to the ankles, where they end in a small cuff that fits over the top of a low riding boot. They are commonly placed in a separate category from other types of breeches due to their additional length. They are most often worn by children. However, they are worn by adults in the show ring in the United Kingdom and Australia, and in the United States are seen on adults during riding lessons and for casual riding. These riding pants have elastic straps or "stirrups" that run under the rider's boots, and are usually worn with garters, to prevent them from riding up. They are meant to be worn with jodhpur boots, also known as "paddock boots", which come up just above the ankles. The advantage of jodhpurs is that expensive high riding boots are not required to protect the calf of the leg from rubbing against the horse's flank or the stirrup leathers.
Kentucky jodhpurs
Kentucky jodhpurs are full-length riding pants used exclusively in saddle seat style riding. Like hunt seat jodhpurs, they are close-fitting from waist to ankle, but differ in that they are much longer, ending with a flared bell bottom that fits over the jodhpur boot, usually extending longer than the heel of the boot in back, and covering the arch of the foot (but not the toe) in front. The overall look gives the impression of a rider with a long leg, a desired equitation standard. Like the hunt seat jodhpur, they have elastic straps that run under the boot to help hold the pant leg in place.

Color is important in selecting breeches for competition. Sanctioning organizations and tradition both dictate that show clothing is to be quiet, classic and conservative in design. White is common in dressage, and is also seen in show jumping. Beige is seen in most hunt seat-style equestrian disciplines, though light grays, "canary" (a dull yellow), rust, tan, and an olive-greenish colour are periodically popular with hunt seat competitors. Eventers wear classic colours for the dressage and stadium phase, but less classic colours may be seen on the cross-country course (especially at the lower levels) to match the "stable colours" of the rider. Saddle seat riders, whose riding clothing styles derived from men's business suits, wear Kentucky jodhpurs in dark colors, usually black, navy blue, or a shade that matches the riding coat.

Breeches may be front or side zip. Some competitors believe the side-zip to give a cleaner appearance and to be more flattering. Styles are also developing to parallel trends in street clothing, including low-rise breeches and brightly colored and patterned breeches & jodhpurs that are aimed primarily at children.

Riding breeches were formerly made of thick cavalry-twill and had flared thighs (balloon legs), until the invention and use of multi-stretch fabrics like Nylon and Spandex became widespread for riding in the 1960s. The balloon legs were there to accommodate the riders knees as they sat in the saddle, but fabrics that stretched in all four directions made such excess material unnecessary and the form-fitting and much thinner modern breeches and jodhpurs became normal.

=== Fencing breeches ===
Fencing breeches are worn in the sport of fencing to permit fencers to extend their legs more than they could wearing normal jogging trousers or tracksuit bottoms. Fencing breeches are also used as protective clothing for the legs.

== See also ==
- Breeches buoy, a device for moving a person from one ship to another, originally consisting of a pair of canvas "breeches" suspended below a pulley.
- Braccae
- Clothing terminology
- The Breeches Bible, a Geneva-edited Bible of 1560, was so called on account of rendition of Genesis iii.7 (already in Wyclif): "They sewed figge leaves together, and made themselves breeches."
- Daniele da Volterra, an Italian artist nicknamed "the breeches maker" (il braghettone)
