= Statue of Cervantes (Madrid) =

Monument in plaza de las Cortes, Madrid

Miguel de Cervantes
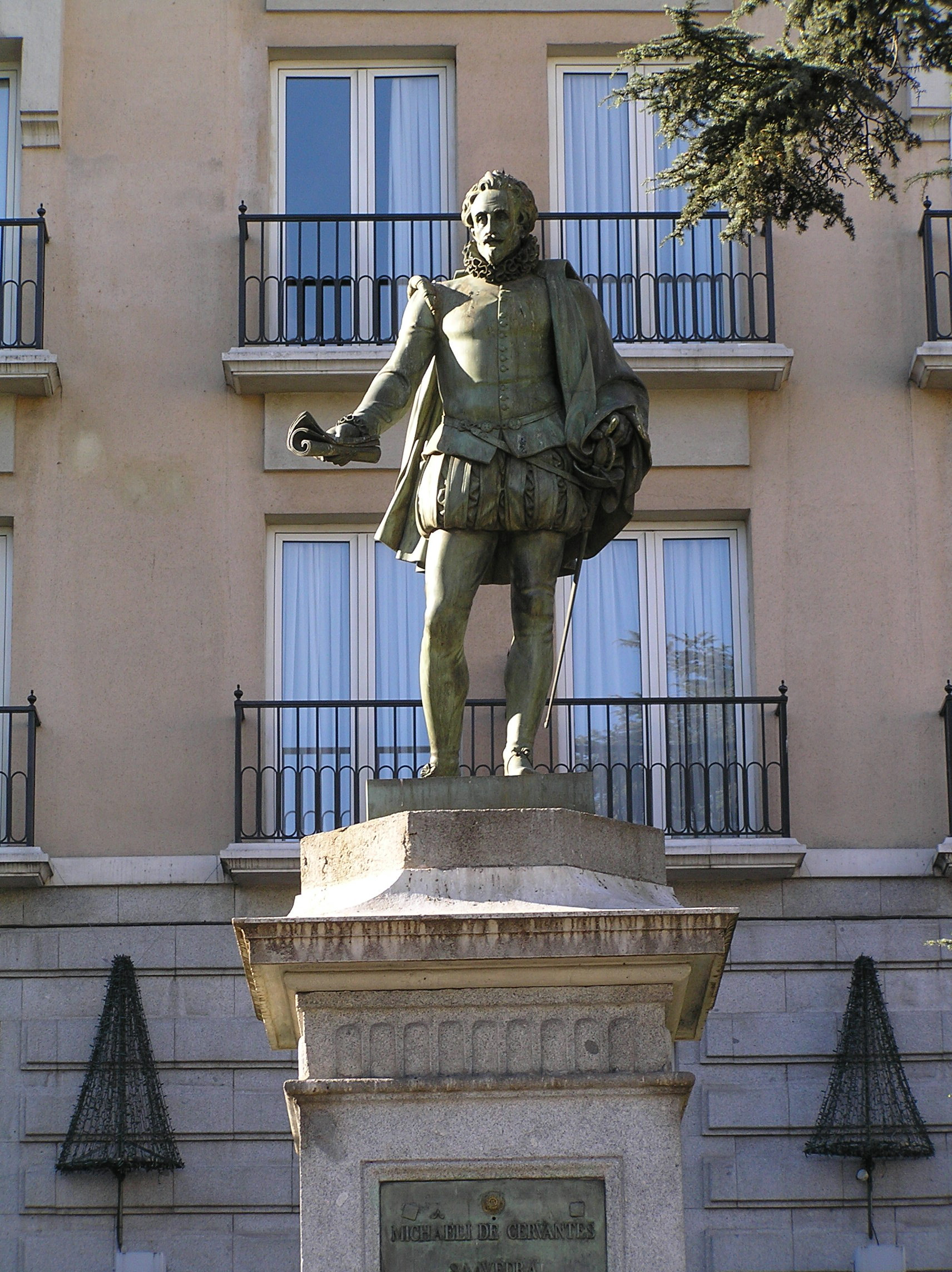
- 40.415751°N 3.696474°W
- Location: Plaza de las Cortes, Madrid, Spain
- Designer: Antonio Solá (statue); José Piquer Duart (reliefs); Isidro González Velázquez (pedestal)
- Material: Bronze, granite, limestone
- Opening date: 1835
- Dedicated to: Miguel de Cervantes

Miguel de Cervantes or the Statue of Cervantes (Spanish: Estatua de Cervantes) is an instance of public art in Madrid, Spain. Erected in 1835, it is dedicated to Miguel de Cervantes Saavedra. It lies on the Plaza de las Cortes, in front of the Congress of Deputies.

== History and description ==
By 1831 the Duke of San Fernando talked to sculptor Antonio Solá about the prospect of creating a statue to pay homage to Cervantes. The Duke asked for permission to Ferdinand VII, yet the monarch seized the project for himself and charged Manuel Fernández Varela with the task of funding the monument instead.

The bronze statue by Solá was cast in Rome and arrived to Madrid in 1835. It features the standing figure of the writer with a slightly bent right leg, holding a roll of papers with his right hand and leaning the left one on the knob of his sword; he wears Spanish breeches, a buttoned-up jacket, ruff and a short cape.

Tentatively placed in the plaza del Duque de Nájera in the beginning, the monument was moved to the Plaza de las Cortes by July 1835.

The architectural design of the pedestal was authored by Isidro González Velázquez. The front and back sides of the pedestal feature two bronze plaques respectively reading the Latin language "michaeli de cervantes / saavedra / hispaniae scriptorum / principi / anno / m.d.ccc.xxxv" and the Spanish translation "a miguel de cervantes / saavedra / principe de los ingenios / españoles / año de / m.d.ccc.xxxv".

The lateral sides of the main body of the pedestal (made of limestone and granite) feature two bronze reliefs by José Piquer Duart related to Cervantes' magnum opus Don Quixote de la Mancha, depicting the adventure of the lions on the left-hand side and Don Quixote and Sancho Panza driven by the goddess of madness on the right-hand one. The circular basement on which the plinth emerges is made of granite.

From 1981 to 1986, during the mayoral mandate of Enrique Tierno Galván, four replicas of the bronze statue were gifted to New York, Moscow, Beijing and La Paz.

Its specific location in the Plaza de las Cortes was modified in 2009. During the relocation works a time capsule was found; the cache included four tomes of Don Quixote, the 1834 Royal Statute, two newspapers, two government gazettes such as the Gaceta de Madrid and the Diario de Avisos, a manuscript and a book titled Guía del Forastero.
