= Rhinegraves =

Type of breeches

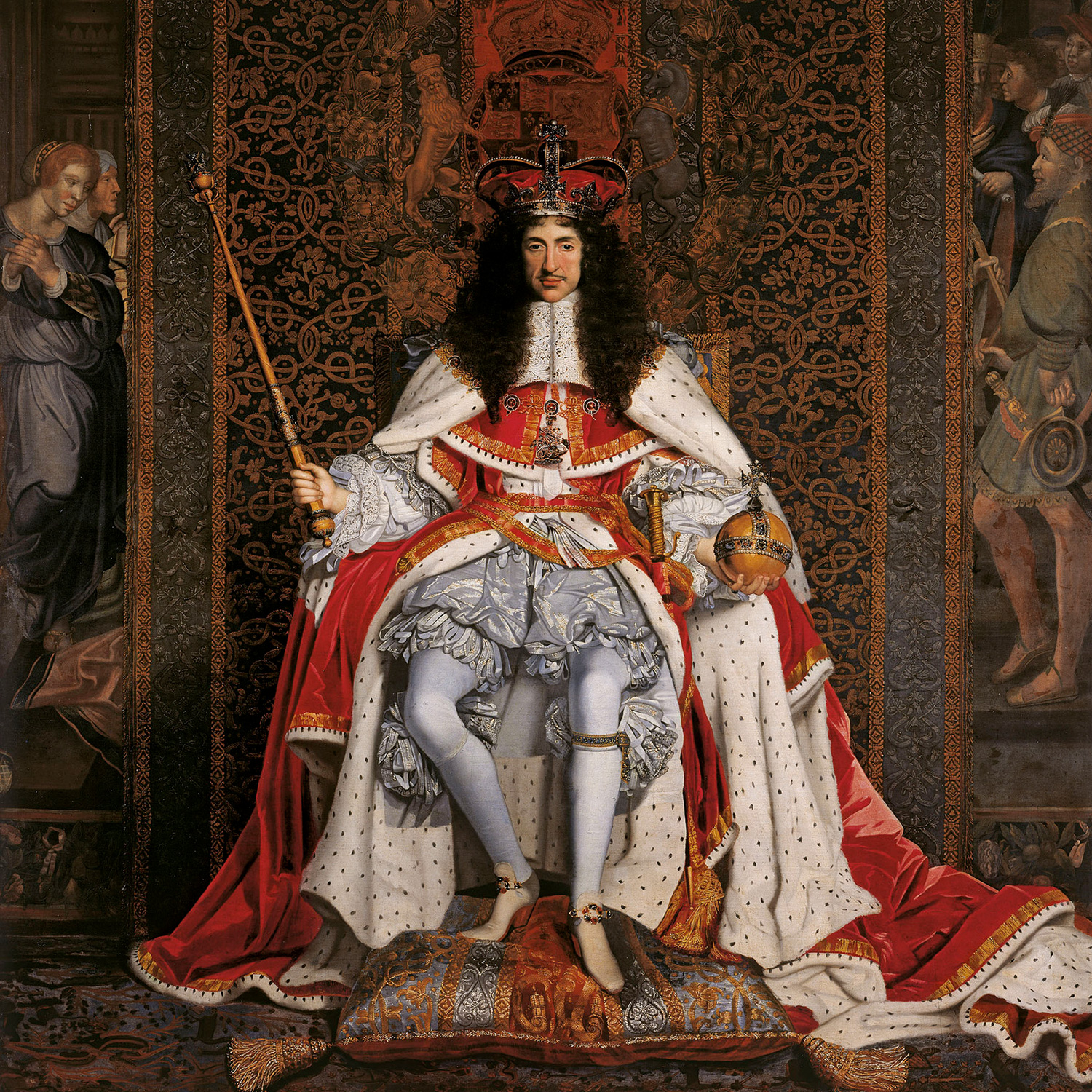
Charles II of England in rhinegraves, painting by John Michael Wright, 1671-1676

Rhinegraves are a form of breeches which were popular from the early 1660s until the mid-1670s and early 1680 in Western Europe. They were very full petticoat breeches gathered at or above the knee. They were worn under petticoat breeches or under an overskirt which was decorated with ribbon loops around the waist and around the knee. Where the knee was gathered, a large frill of lace and stocking tops added further decoration.

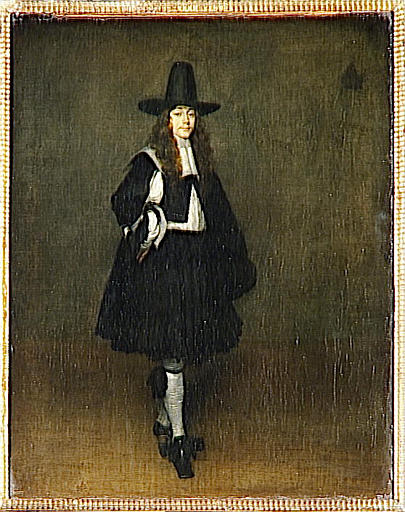
Man in Black, by Gerard ter Borch, c. 1673

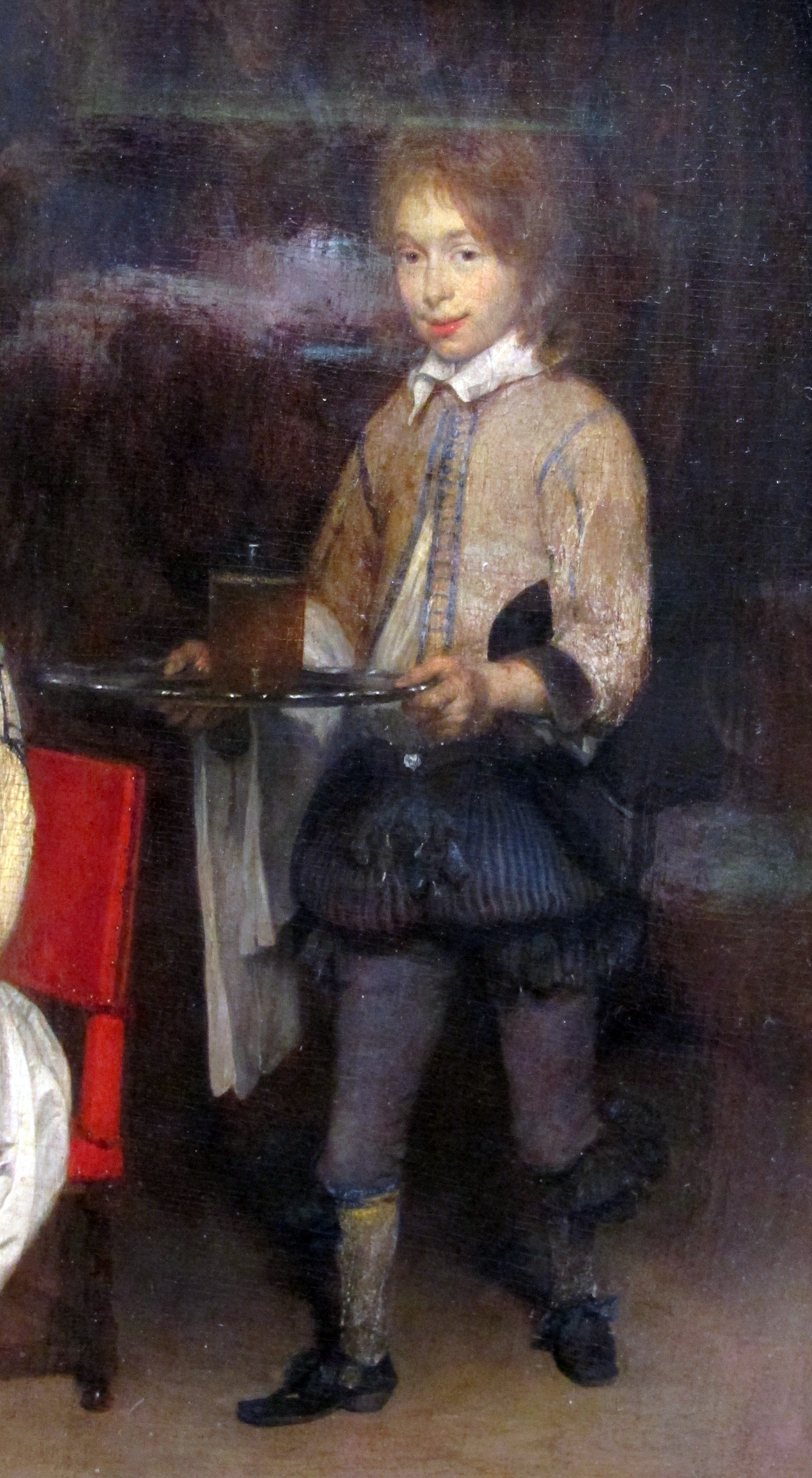
Boy servant wearing close-fitting breeches and petticoat breeches over them, 1657

During the 1670s as the longer coat and long waistcoat became popular, these very full breeches became less full and by the late 1670s and early 1680s they were replaced by more tight fitting breeches with the stockings worn over them.
