= Chaps =

Leather leg coverings

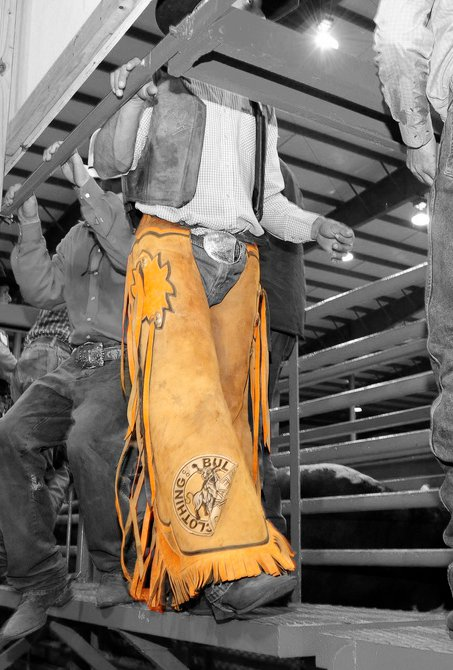
Batwing chaps

Chaparreras or chaps (/tʃæps, ʃæps/) are a type of sturdy over-pants (overalls) or leggings that developed in Mexico from earlier Spanish equestrian and ranching traditions brought to America during the colonial era. Chaps are made of leather, without a seat, made up of two separate legs that are fastened to the waist with straps or belt. They are worn over trousers and were originally intended for protecting the rider from the rain and mud, and from tears and injuries. They were created to replace armas de agua (water shields) or simply armas (shields), a set of leather flaps that hung from the Mexican saddle to protect the rider's legs from the rain. The word "chaparreras" is believed to have come from either “chaparrón”, a cloudburst or sudden, heavy rain, or from “chaparros”, a Mexican colloquial name for brush and a type of shrub. Due to the difficult pronunciation, Americans shortened the word to Chaps, originally spelled and pronounced schaps or shaps. Chivarras, from chivo (goat), is the name for chaparreras made of goatskins tanned with the hair on.

There were other similar garments worn by Mexican riders, including botas huastecas, a set of wide leggings of pre-Hispanic origin used in the lowlands along the Gulf of Mexico, mitazas, leggings that were similar to Chaparreras but were not attached to the waist, only reaching up to the thigh, and the cuadrilera, a small apron that predates chaparreras, made of leather that only covered the hip and part of the thigh, that was used for roping.

In the modern world, they are worn for both practical work purposes and for exhibition or show use. Chaparreras or chaps have also been adopted for use on motorcycles, particularly by cruiser-style motorcycle riders.

== Etymology ==
The most accepted etymology of “chaparreras" is that it comes from "chaparros" a Mexican colloquial generic name for brush, and a specific type of shrub, chaparral (thick, thorny, low brush), from which it’s believed they were designed to protect the legs while riding on horseback. Another, equally plausible etymology is that it comes from chaparrón, which means cloudburst or downpour, a heavy rain, itself from the onomatopoeic chap which is the sound of rain hitting the ground. In most 19th century texts, chaparreras are described as trousers worn to protect the pants underneath from the rain and mud. Due to the difficult pronunciation, Americans shortened the word to Chaps, originally spelled and pronounced Shaps. By 1884, the Dictionary of American Regional English notes use of the word in Wyoming, spelled "schaps". Chaparejos, misspelled by Americans as "chaparajos", is a blend of the words chaparreras and aparejo (rig or equipment for horseback riding).

== History ==
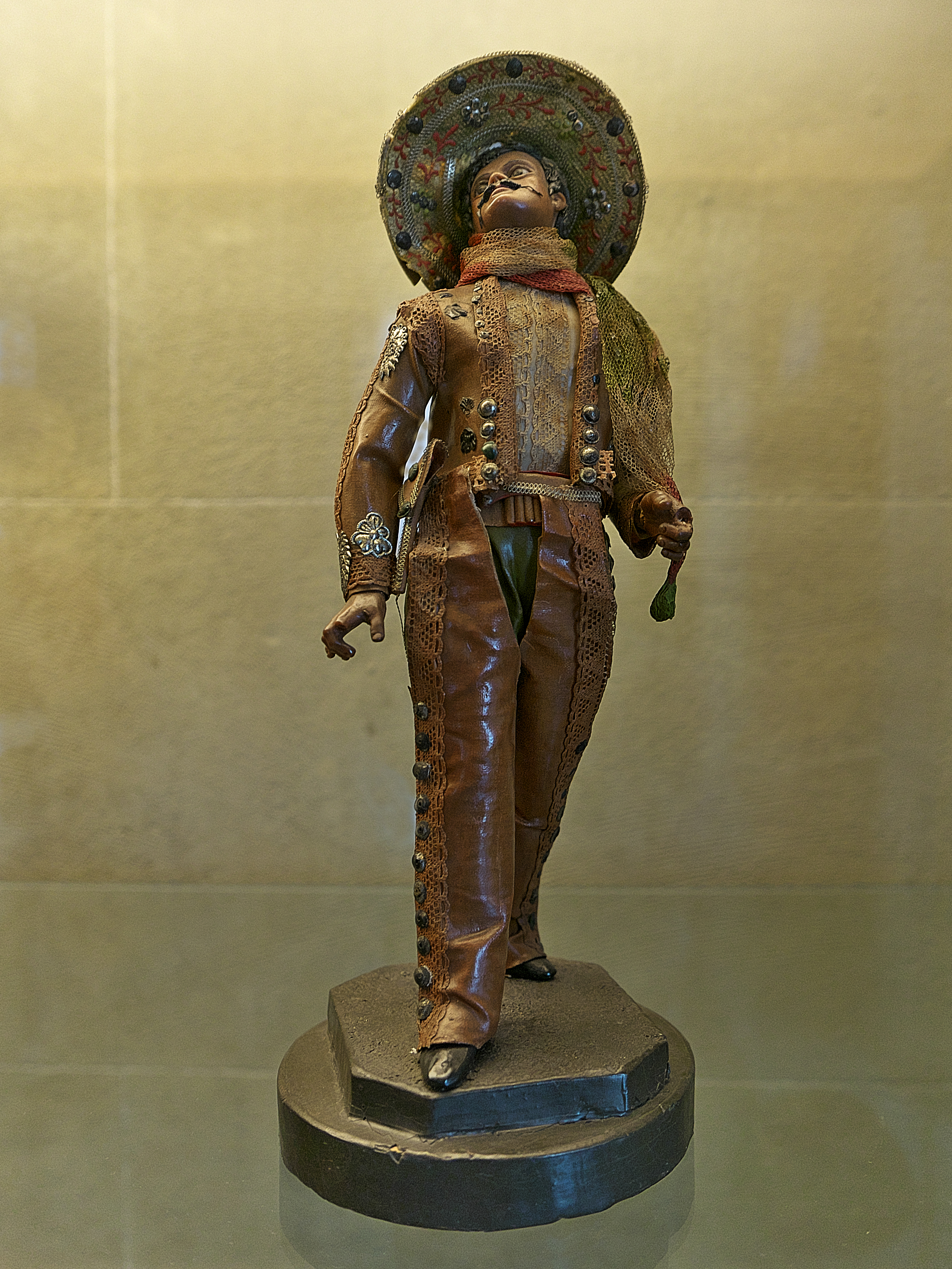
Charro wearing chaparreras (ca. 1860).

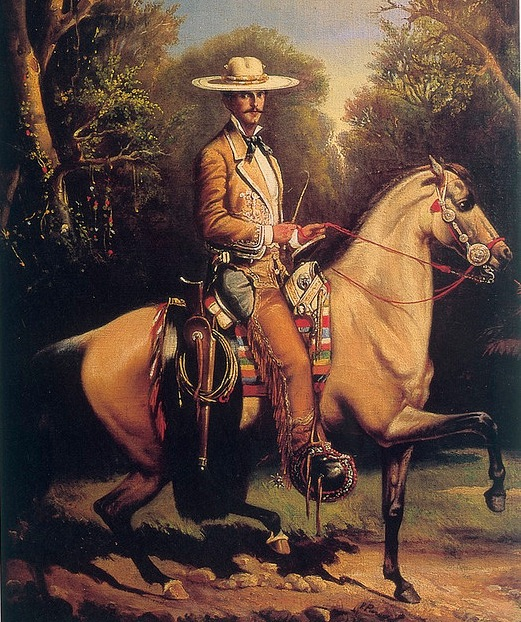
Don Alonso Peón de Regil in Charro outfit with Chaparreras (1865).

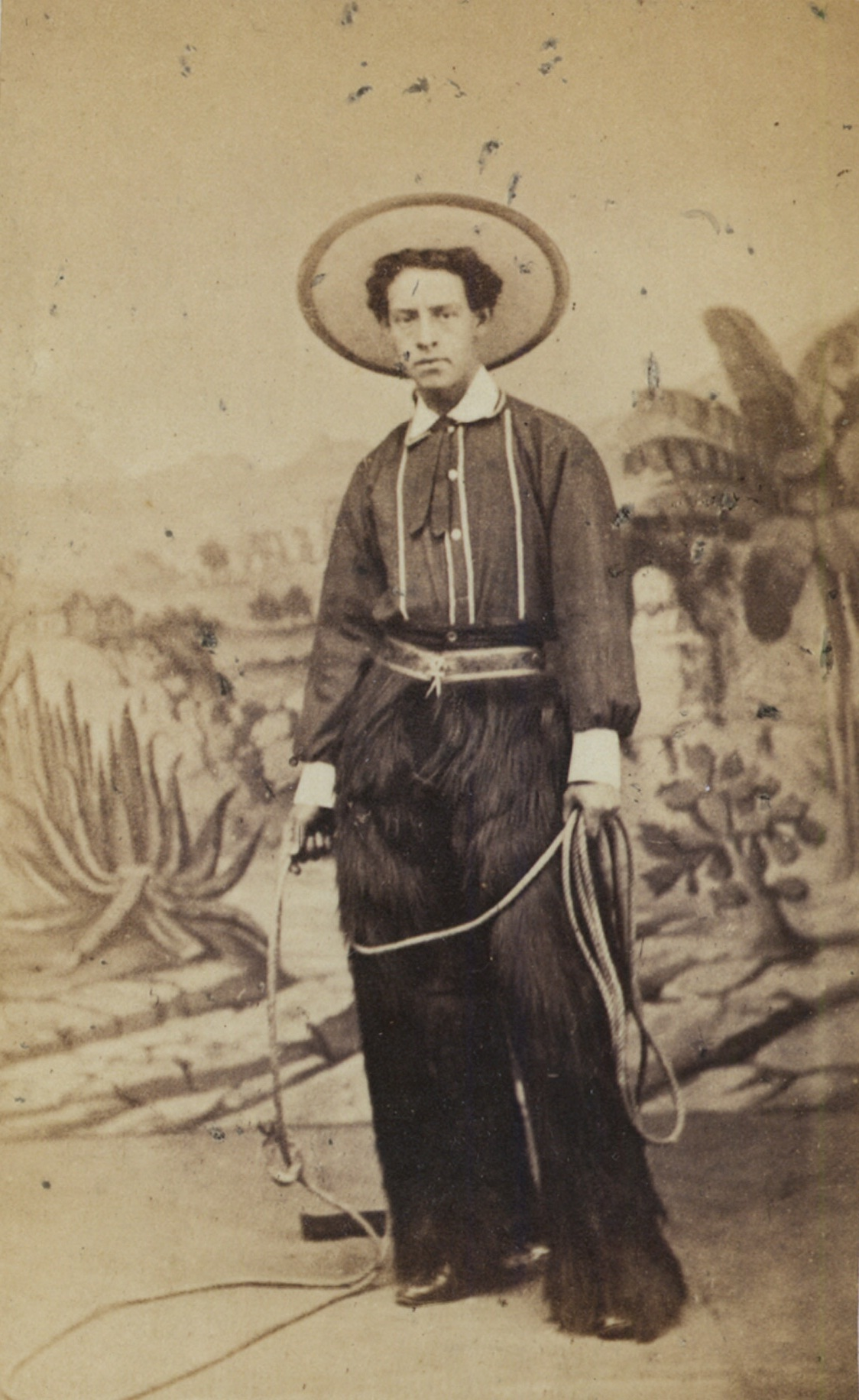
Mexican Ranchero wearing furry Chaparreras, probably Chivarras or goat-skin Chaparreras (1867).

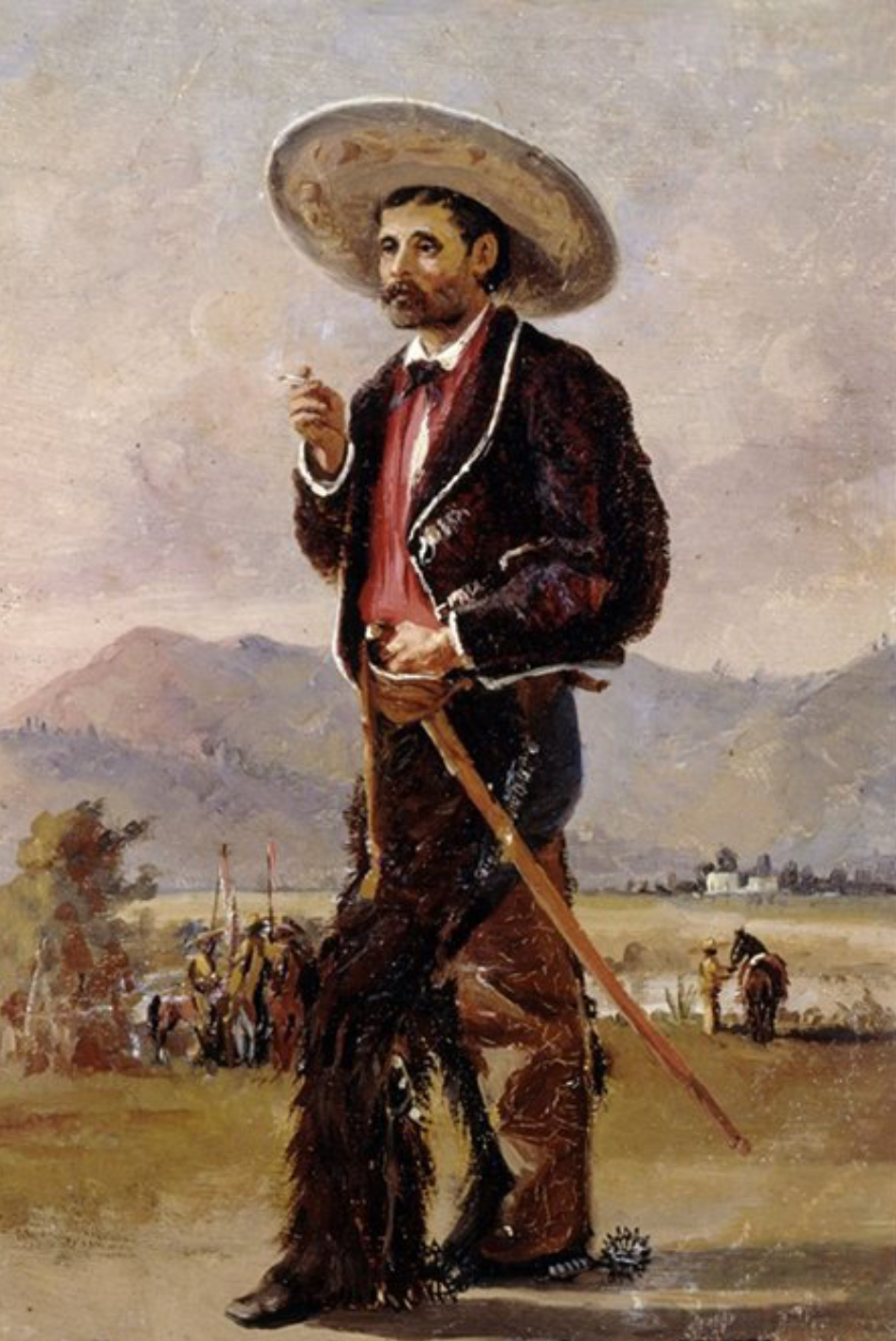
Charro Chinaco or a Mexican guerrilla fighter during the French Intervention, wearing furry Chaparreras.

The precise history of Chaparreras is uncertain. They appeared on the scene in Mexico between the late 1830s and early 1840s. The first mention of them that historians have been able to find is from 1843. Before this, no evidence of their existence has been found, as they were absent from writings and paintings from that time. Before the appearance of Chaparreras, the Mexican horsemen used a set of leather flaps called Armas or Armas de Agua that hung from the pommel of their saddles. These armas or “shields” were used to protect the riders pants and boots from the rain, hence their name “Armas de Agua” or “water shields”. Armas also have a recent history as no evidence of their existence prior to the 19th century has been found, neither in writings nor in paintings.

The first documented evidence of Chaparreras is in an 1843 article titled “Cartas Sobre México: Alameda y Bucareli” in the magazine “El Museo Mexicano” about life in the Mexico City promenade Alameda Central, although the writer doesn’t go into detail about them. It would be the following year 1844 in the article “Costumbres y Trajes Nacionales: Los Rancheros” about the life and customs of Mexican Rancheros, that readers would get a description. The writer, Don Domingo Revilla, states that Chaparreras are “in vogue everywhere” in Mexico implying that they were something recent and new. Revilla describes Chaparreras as “trousers with buttons on the sides and no seat” and goes on to say that they are “widely used in El Jaral and in Tierra-Adentro” referring to the great hacienda “El Jaral de Berrio” in Guanajuato and “Tierra-Adentro” or hinterland. One popular song from that time tells that people go to “El Jaral” to buy chaparrreras. El Jaral de Berrio, known for their fine leather production, might be a possible place of origin of Chaparreras.

The first Chaparreras were actually pants made out of leather with no seat and with buttons on the sides, as Revilla described, that was worn over the riders’ cloth or suede pants to protect them from the rain and mud. Don Carlos Rincón Gallardo states that those early Chaparreras were distinct from the most recent ones (20th century) in that they were never unbuttoned, so that, to put them on, the rider had to remove his shoes and place one leg into each pant-leg one at a time like any other pants. These first Chaparreras were in disuse in Mexico by the early 20th century being replaced by a new model that remains the standard today, two separate leather pant-legs that are united at the top by a strap or clasp that serves as a belt, with buttons or laces on the side that could be undone making it possible to wear them without having to take your boots off

One common assumption today is that chaparreras derived from Spanish zahones, a leather apron used by shepherds, hunters, workers and others, to protect the front of pants from tears, but no evidence has been found to support this. The hypothesis holds that chaparreras are zahones that had been highly modified to better suit the needs of Mexico’s horsemen; for example, they were made longer to cover the whole leg. But for Chaparreras to have been descended from zahones or be modified versions of them, zahones would have to have existed prior, but in Mexico, no mention of anything resembling zahones has been found in any text, document or painting, either from the 19th century or earlier, so their connection to chaparreras is unlikely.

And in all descriptions of chaparreras made by foreigners they never compared or linked them to zahones. In the accounts of Spanish travelers who described chaparreras, they never mentioned any similarity with zahones or inferred that they were derived from them and never indicated that it was a known garment in Spain; on the contrary, they always implied that chaparreras were something unknown or “exotic” to them. The Spanish writer and poet Juan Martínez Villergas who visited Mexico in the 1850s, found Chaparreras to be interesting or amusing, suggesting they were unknown to him as a Spaniard, and criticized the opulence, stating:

“After the hat, what interested me the most about the persevering Mexicans, are the Chaparreras, a name given to a pair of pants that are open at the sides, from the bottom to the waistband, but although they are always closed, they have one, two, three and up to four rows of buttons just for conspicuous reasons. The more buttons it has, the more it means that the wearer has money to spend, so that there are men who have more buttons on the sides of their chaparreras than hairs on their heads, without being bald, and surely, more than one are ruined by wanting to show off so many buttons.

Likewise, the Spanish journalist and historian Niceto de Zamacois never mentioned Chaparreras as being derived from Spanish zahones nor did he claim they were similar to them when he described them to Spanish readers, implying that they were unknown in Spain, stating:

“In Mexico, “chaparreras" is the name given to a type of wide, leather pants that are worn over the ones they wear when they go horseback riding and it's raining; they reach up to the waist on the front, but only to the end of the thigh on the back, exposing the inner pants around the seat: these chaparreras, which are extremely useful, are attached to the waist by a leather belt with a buckle at the back, which makes them very easy to put on or take off when necessary.”

In addition to this, zahones are not and have never been trousers like chaparreras but rather aprons, known in Spanish as delantal or delantera, two pieces of leather or cloth that only protect the front of the thighs (femur) of each leg and are tied around the waist. Prior to the 20th century, zahones were shorter only covering the front of the thigh down to the knees. In all 19th century Spanish dictionaries, zahones are defined as either leather or cloth aprons or short opened breeches that are tied around the waist and behind each thigh covering the front down to the knees or never going beyond the calves. Zahones, of Arabic origin, are also older than chaparreras dating back to at least the 16th century and were originally gregüescos (zaragüelles), very distinct from the styles of the 19th and 20th centuries. Chaparreras, on the contrary, are not aprons but trousers that cover the entire leg, front and back, and were originally intended to protect the rider's pants from the rain and, unlike zahones, were introduced in the 19th century and have no known connection to gregüescos.

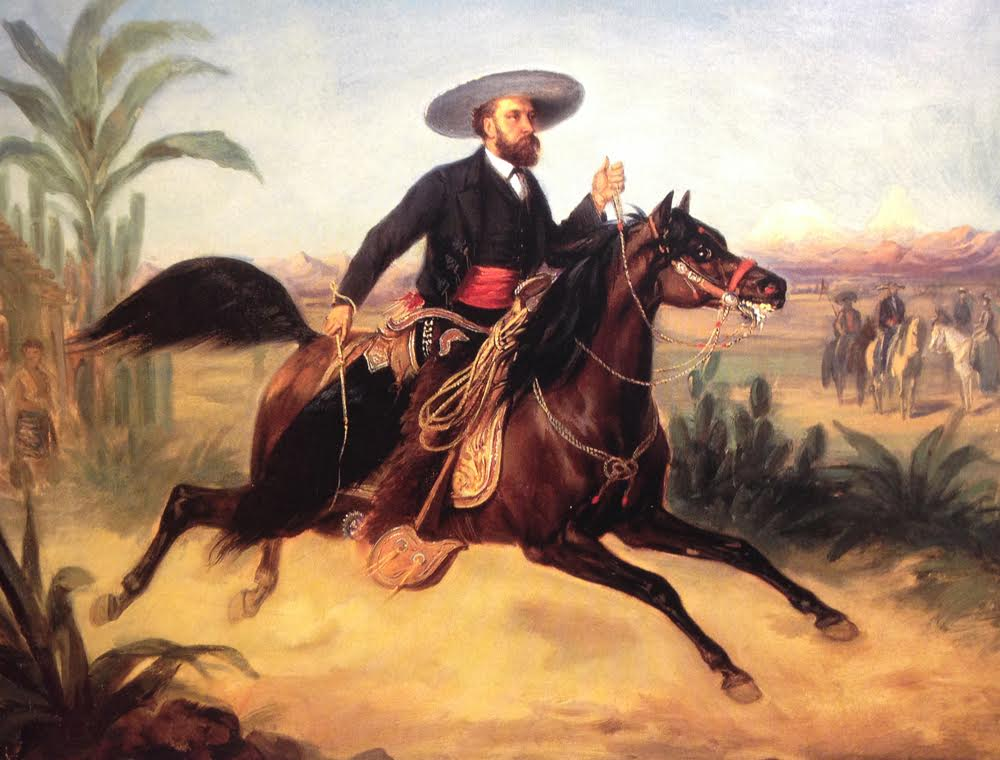
Emperor Maximilian I of Mexico in Charro attire wearing Chaparreras, possibly of bear or otter fur (1865).

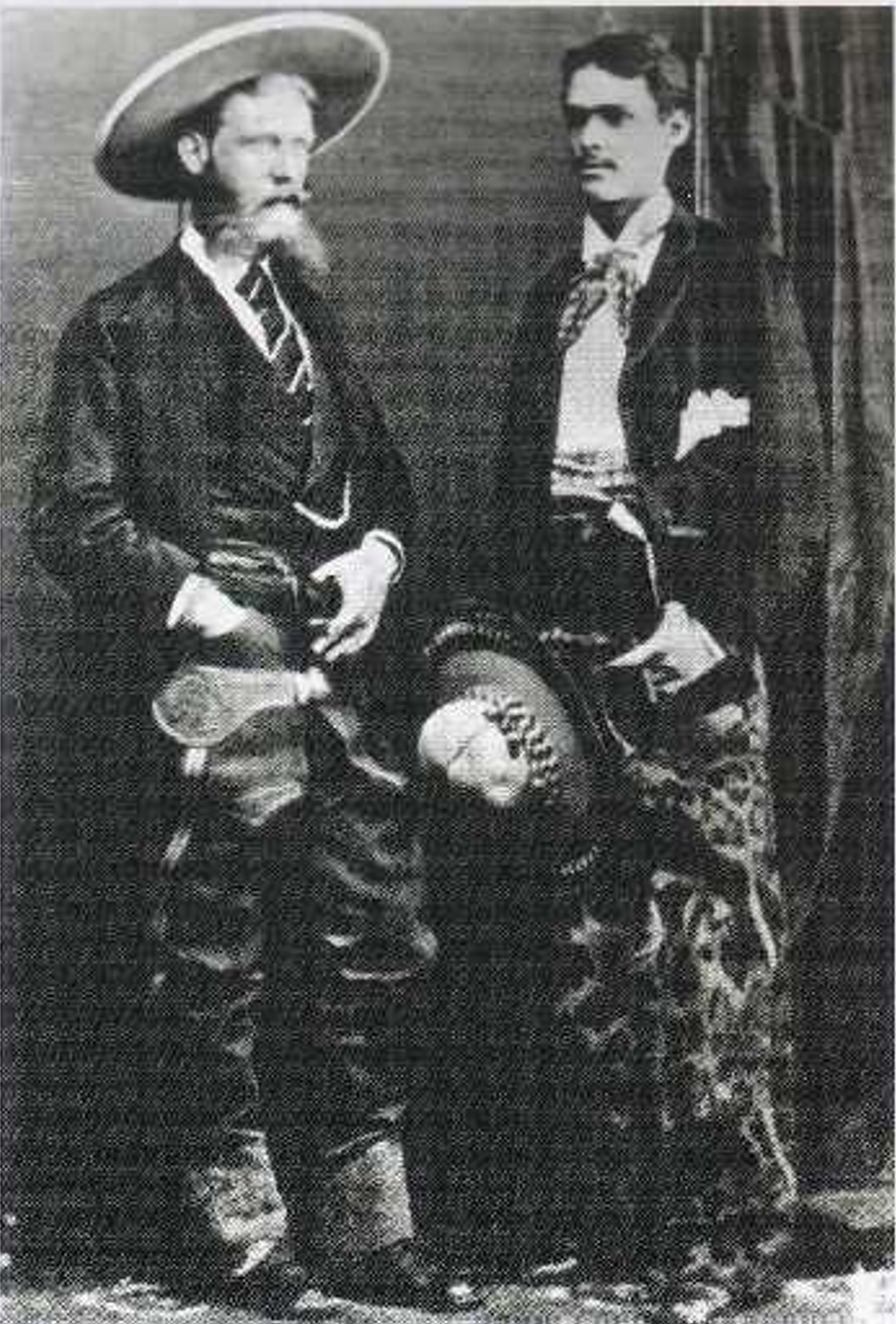
Two men in Charro outfits wearing chaparreras. The man on the right has jaguar skin chaparreras (ca. 1866).

One possible origin of Chaparreras might be the pre-Hispanic “calzas” or leggings used by the indigenous people of Mexico. Leather leggings, called calzas by the Spanish, made out of deerskin or wild dog, were part of the traditional outfit of the Chichimecas of Central Mexico. Botas Huastecas, wide leather leggings or pants that were attached around the waist and were used by the herdsmen of Veracruz might also be a possible origin, as they were similar to and predated chaparreras. The name “Huastecas”, referring to the Huastec people and the peculiar way of manufacture by tanning deerskins with rotten brains and smoking them with burnt corncobs to generate a pungent smell to repel bugs and other critters, indicates an indigenous origin. “Mitazas”, a set of leggings similar to chaparreras but that were not attached at the waist, only reaching up and attaching to each thigh, are also credited to indigenous leggings.

There is also evidence in the United States that certain design features may derive from the mountain men, who copied them from the leggings worn by Native Americans. According to David Hackett Fischer (1989), the leather bottoms worn among frontiersmen had Scotch-Irish and Northern English predecessors, giving 18th century records of sheepskin leggings in Westmorland and gaiters known as "leather stockings" in Carlisle as evidence. Different styles developed to fit local climate, terrain and hazards. Designs were also modified for purely stylistic and decorative purposes. The time of actual appearance of the garment on American cowboys is uncertain. By the late 1870s, however, most Texas cowboys wore them as the cattle industry moved north.

The first chaparreras were made out of cowhide and goatskin tanned with the hair on, the latter being the most sought after because the hair repels water better. These chaparreras made of goatskins are called chivarras, a portmanteau of chivo (goat) and chaparreras. The more expensive ones were made out of jaguar skin, bear and otter fur. Many were embossed with intricate designs and patterns and richly decorated with gold and silver buttons, brooches and buckles.

=== Armas ===
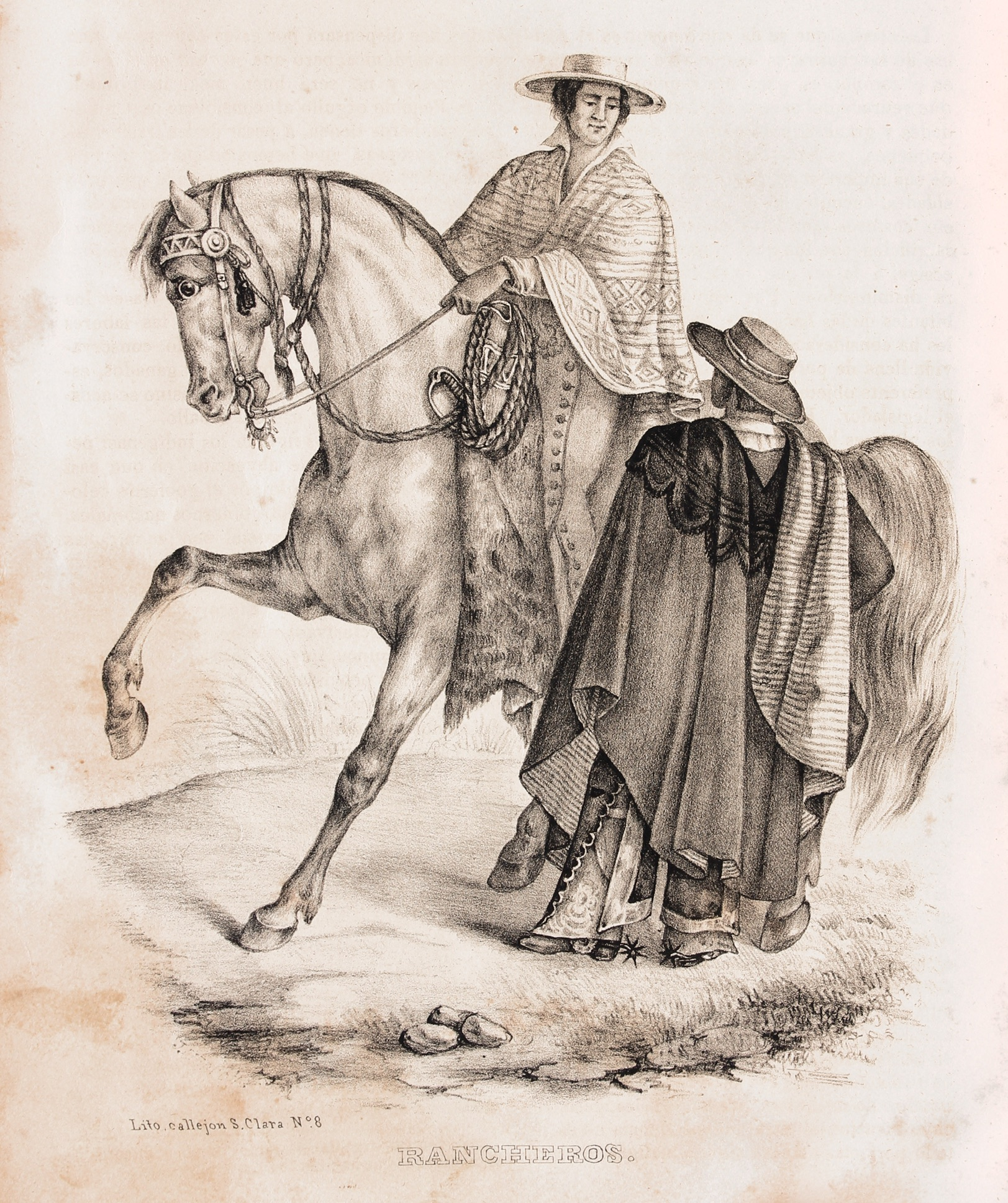
The Ranchero, on horseback, has a set of leopard skin Armas on his saddle. When they weren't being used they simply remained hanging in front of the rider’s legs.

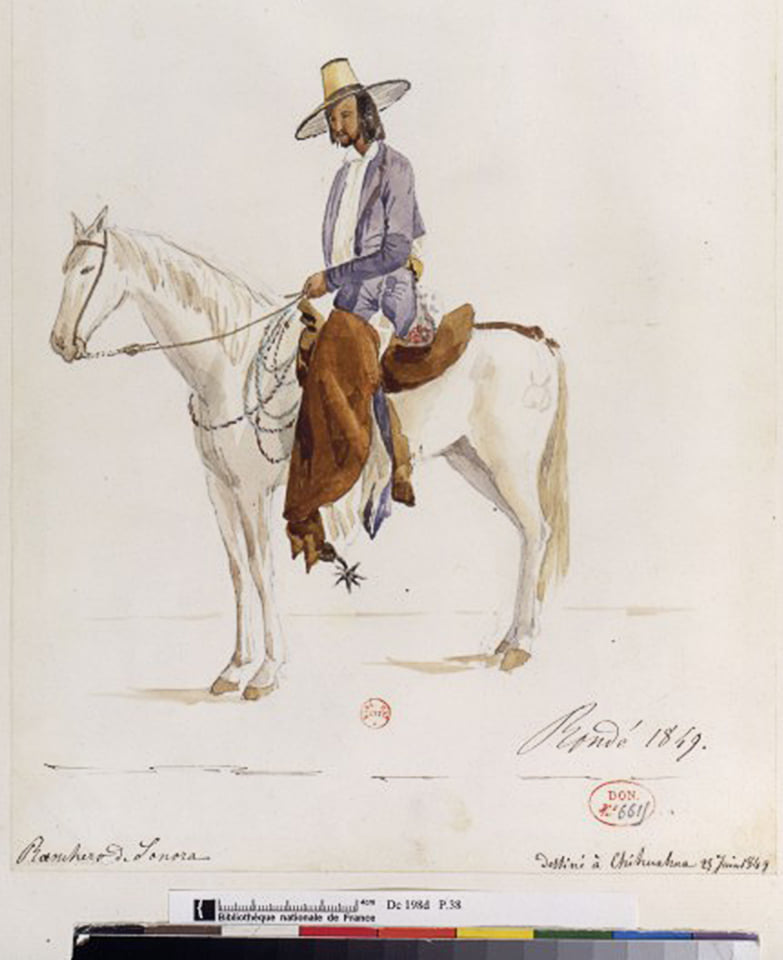
When being used, the Armas are pulled over the legs of the rider and fastened behind the waist (1849).

The Armas de Agua (Water Shields), Armas de Pelo (Hairy Shields), or simply Armas (Shields), are two large leather flaps, commonly goat, deer or calf skin, sometimes embossed, that are attached to and hung from the pommel, on both sides, of the Mexican saddles to cover and protect, from the rain, the Calzoneras (trousers), legs and feet of the Charro. When they are being used, they each are pulled over the legs and feet, and are tied behind the waist. When they are not, they remain hanging on each side of the saddle, just in front of the rider’s legs. When the Charro camped outside, they could be removed from the saddle and be used as a sleeping mat and blanket. Some of the more expensive kind were richly decorated, made of “tiger” (jaguar), puma, bear or otter fur. Armas, like most of the equipment of the Charro, arose in Central Mexico and later, through migration and necessity, they passed on to the rest of the country, to north and south.

The history of armas, like that of chaparreras, is also uncertain as they are also absent from texts and paintings from before the 19th century. In an 1805 classified ad in the —Diario de Mexico— newspaper, a vaquero saddle described as “última moda” meaning “latest fashion” or “state-of-the art” is being sold. The ad mentions it’s made with a silver lined saddle-tree, embroidered silk and states that it comes “equipped with everything, even with its armas de agua ”. The “última moda” or “state-of-the-art” and the emphasis that it comes with armas, would indicate that it was something new, recent and expensive in the Mexican saddlery and equestrian world.

Some people, mostly Americans, have also argued and assumed that armas originated in Spain and were brought to Mexico by the Spaniards. But, just like chaparreras, no evidence of their existence has been found in Spain, and those Spaniards that described armas to a Spanish audience found them strange and, in some cases, described them as simple “trifles”, indicating they were unknown in their country. Spanish lawyer and monarchist, Luis Manuel del Rivero, not only derided the Mexican vaquero saddle and armas as “grotesque” but also never mentioned chaparreras as part of the Ranchero attire, which would show that they were either not common or didn't exist yet around the time he visited Mexico (1842):

“The Ranchero is a man of higher thoughts, very strong, great horseman, […] His attire, boots made of leather with which the leg is wrapped several times; spurs, as I have said, colossal; wide leather or cloth pants over cloth underwear; cotton shirt; a sash with which the waist is secured; a cotona, that is, a short leather jacket that is worn over the head, and a very large and heavy chambergo or Jarano hat. For overdress, a Manga or Serape. His horse's trappings are no less grotesque, since the Vaquero saddle with its large stirrups and flaps, especially if it is complemented by an anquera, Armas de Agua, and other trifles, is a world in the midst of which the Ranchero finds himself in his world, and he believes himself superior to all the powerful men of the earth, executing extremely difficult spins and movements.”

Armas began to be replaced by chaparreras around the 1840s, although they didn't provide all the services and protection that the Armas did, since they cannot be used as a sleeping mat nor protect the foot. Today Armas continue to exist and are still used in certain regions of the country both for work, as in Baja California Sur, and for ceremonial or ornamental purposes in Central and Southern Mexico.

=== Mitazas ===
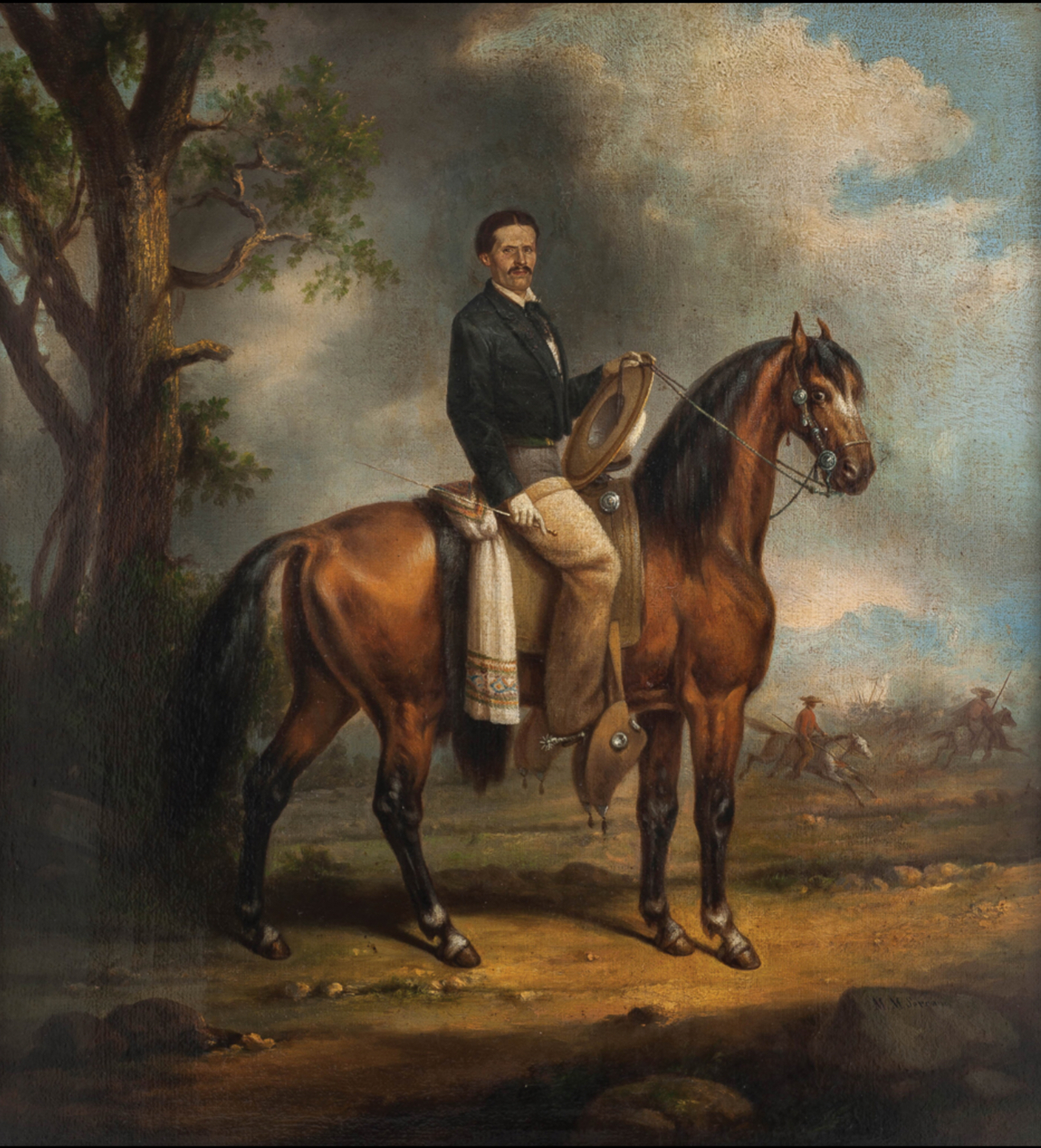
Mexican general Jesús González Ortega wearing Mitazas (1862).

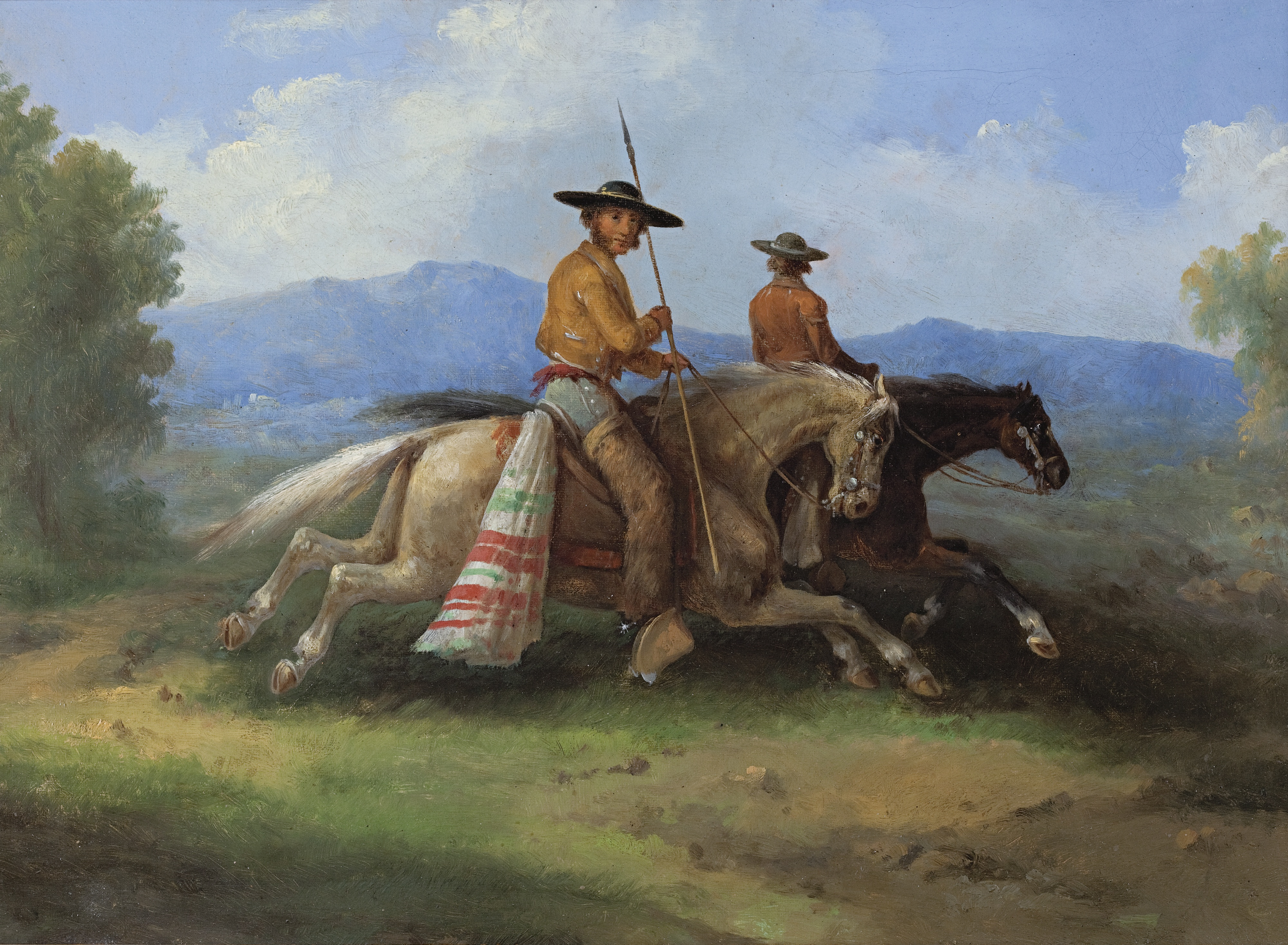
Mexican Charro wearing goat-skin Mitazas tanned with the hair on.

Mitazas are separate, long leather leggings that only reached up to the thighs and are not fastened at the waist. The first ones were fastened at each of the thighs but later ones were fastened at the sides with small buckles. These Mitazas that reached up to the thigh are no longer in use. Today, what people refer to as “mitazas” are more like half-chaps, only covering the calves.

According to Mexican writer and journalist Manuel Payno, mitazas were more common in the northern areas of Mexico:

On a clear and calm day at the end of September 184... […] a large cavalry party entered through the only road that connects the port of Tampico with the interior. At the head of them was a young man wearing a Turkish blue cloth jacket with a red collar and cuffs; […] he was followed at a distance by a lancer, with a stern, tanned face and a large black mustache; […] Behind them were two other young men dressed in the Tamaulipas style, that is, with wide breeches or Mitazas, as they call them in the country, made of yellow suede, a Cotona jacket made of the same material with laces and small silver eagles on the back and buttons, and a large flat Jarano hat.

=== Botas Huastecas ===
In the lowlands of Veracruz, the country horsemen that worked in the haciendas of the state were called Jarochos, specifically those dedicated to the job of vaquero (cowherd) and everything related to cattle ranching. Their customs, traditions and costume were very distinct from the herdsmen of the highlands, the Rancheros. They didn't wear any type of footwear, riding their horses barefooted. When they were herding cattle out in the woods and mountains, their only protection on their legs was a pair of leggings called “Botas Huastecas” (Huastec Boots), a kind of wide leggings or breeches that were fastened at the waist, similar to chaparreras, made of deer-skin tanned with putrefied brains and smoked with corn cobs, to protect them from thorns and snakes, and repel chiggers, ticks and other bugs with the putrid smell.

The manufacturing process for making "Botas Huastecas" consisted, according to an article published in 1869, in:

“The boots, which are not boots but leggings, since they don’t have soles, nor are they worn on the feet, are made of the skins of two deer, which are arranged so that the respective neck of each one serves to cover the calves and part of the thighs, and they are tied to the waist with cords of the same skin. The way to prepare the skin is as follows: the animal's brains are saved until they enter a state of putrefaction; the skins are then greased with this ointment, after being previously dried in the sun on the hairy side, and is then rubbed with a deer rib and becomes soft under this operation. When it is soft enough, it is colored with the smoke of burnt corn husks. The purpose of this is to impregnate the skin with a strong and pungent odor, which prevents ticks from adhering to them. The boots must be very wide and form many folds and wrinkles, both to avoid thorns from penetrating them, and to escape from the bite of snakes when having to cross bushy places.”

Botas Huastecas no longer exist since at least the late 19th century.

=== Cuadrilera or Rozadera ===
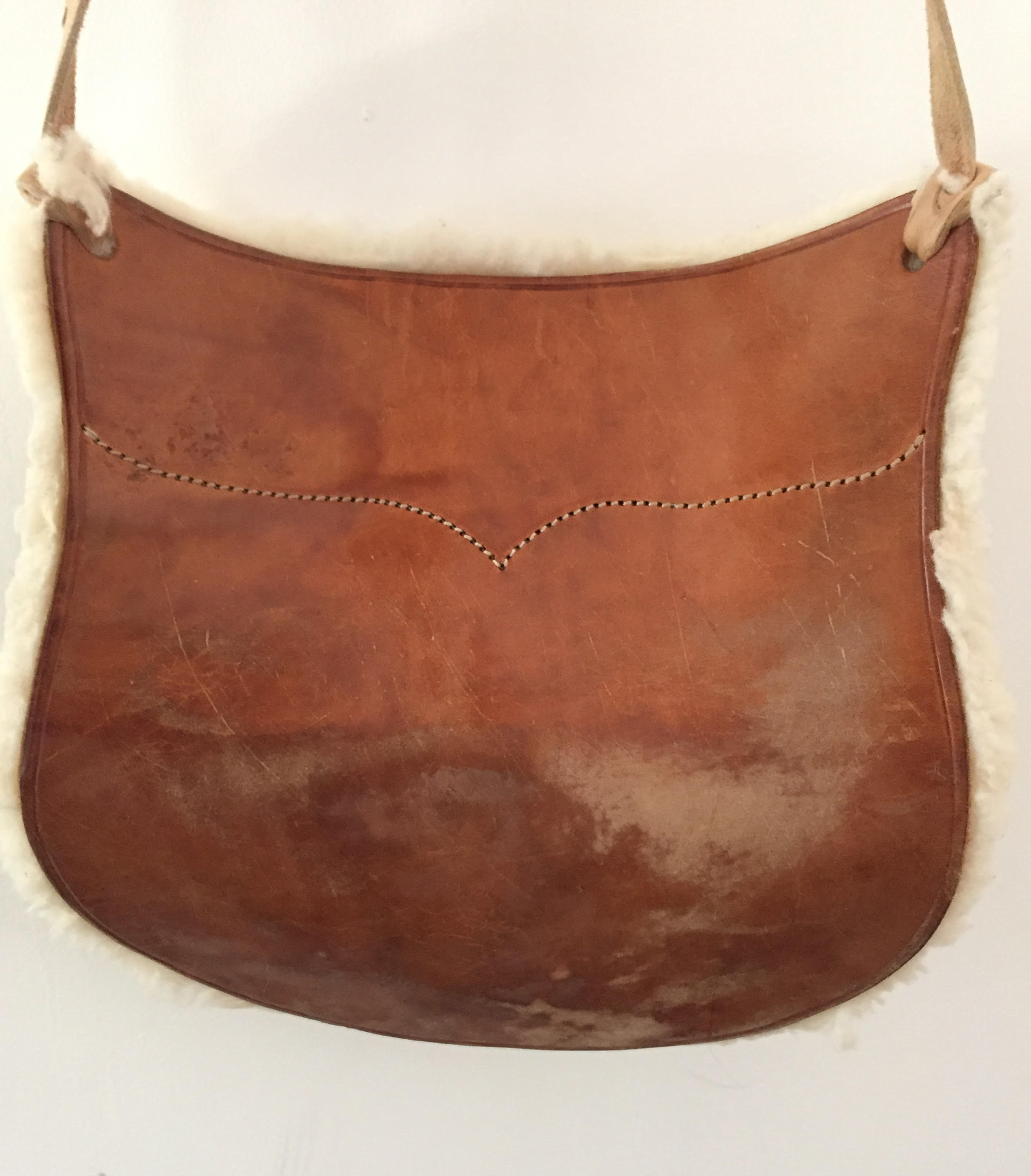
Leather Cuadrilera

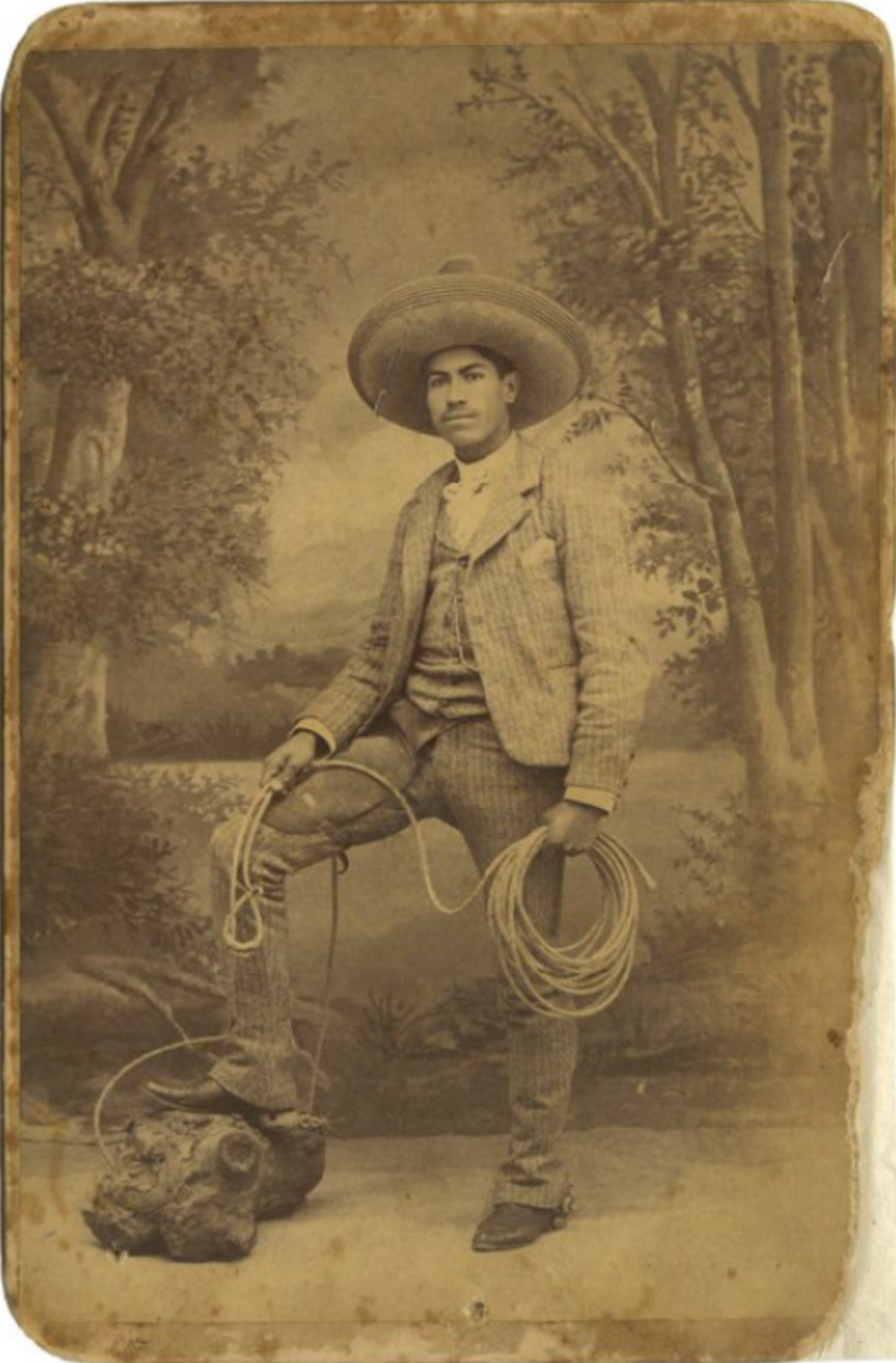
Mexican Charro wearing a cuadrilera on the right hip (ca. 1900).

Cuadrilera also known as Rozadera, is a piece of leather in the form of an apron, that only covers part of the hip and thigh, and has four straps, two that attach to the waist and the other two are fasten around the thigh. It is made of cowhide or suede, and were used for roping, prior to the existence of Chaparreras, and used today when chaparreras are not worn, to protect the pants and legs from the chafing of the rope. It goes on the right leg for roping on horseback, and on the left when roping on foot. Cuadrileras can be used together with Chaparreras by wearing it underneath to provide extra protection when doing more heavy roping. Most Chaparreras today come with built in rozaderas.

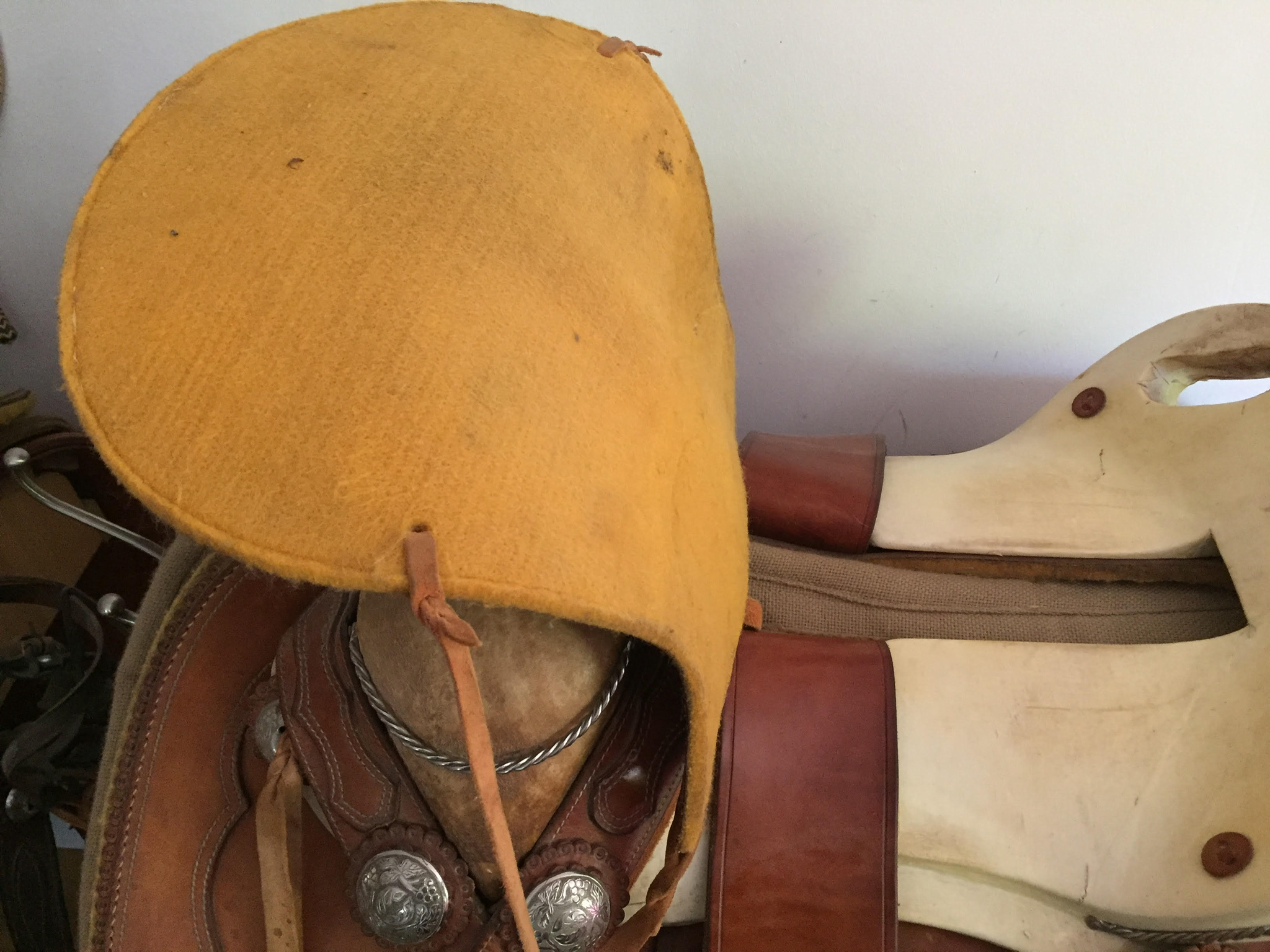
The Cuadrilera is lifted over the saddle horn and can be place back down when remounting and thus avoid a hot seat.

The Cuadrilera also functions as a cover to protect the saddle seat from wear and tear and to prevent it from getting hot by attaching it on the front of the saddle; if there is a need to dismount, leaving the saddled horse in the sun, the charro can lift the cuadrilera like a lid over the saddle horn and when he remounts he can put it back in its place. The cuadrilera is the most traditional and Charro way to protect the saddle seat.

== American style Chaps ==
Shotgun chaps, sometimes called "stovepipes", were so named because the legs are straight and narrow. They were the earliest design used by Texas cowboys, in wide use by the late 1870s. Each leg is cut from a single piece of leather. Their fit is snug, wrapping completely around the leg. Modern versions may have full-length zippers running along the outside of the leg from the thigh to just above the ankle. The edge of each legging is usually fringed and the bottom is sometimes cut with an arch or flare that allows a smooth fit over the arch of a boot. Shotguns do not flap around the way the batwing design can, and they are also better at trapping body heat, an advantage in windy, snowy or cold conditions, though unpleasant in very hot or humid weather. Shotgun chaps are more common on ranches in the northwest, Rocky Mountains and northern plains states, as well as Canada, and are the design most commonly seen in horse show competition for western riders, especially western equitation. English riders who wear full-length chaps also usually wear a shotgun style, sometimes without fringe.

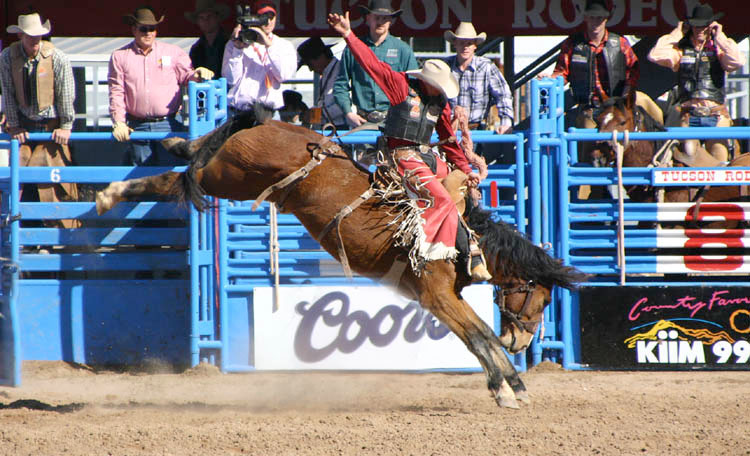
A bronco rider wearing batwing style rodeo chaps

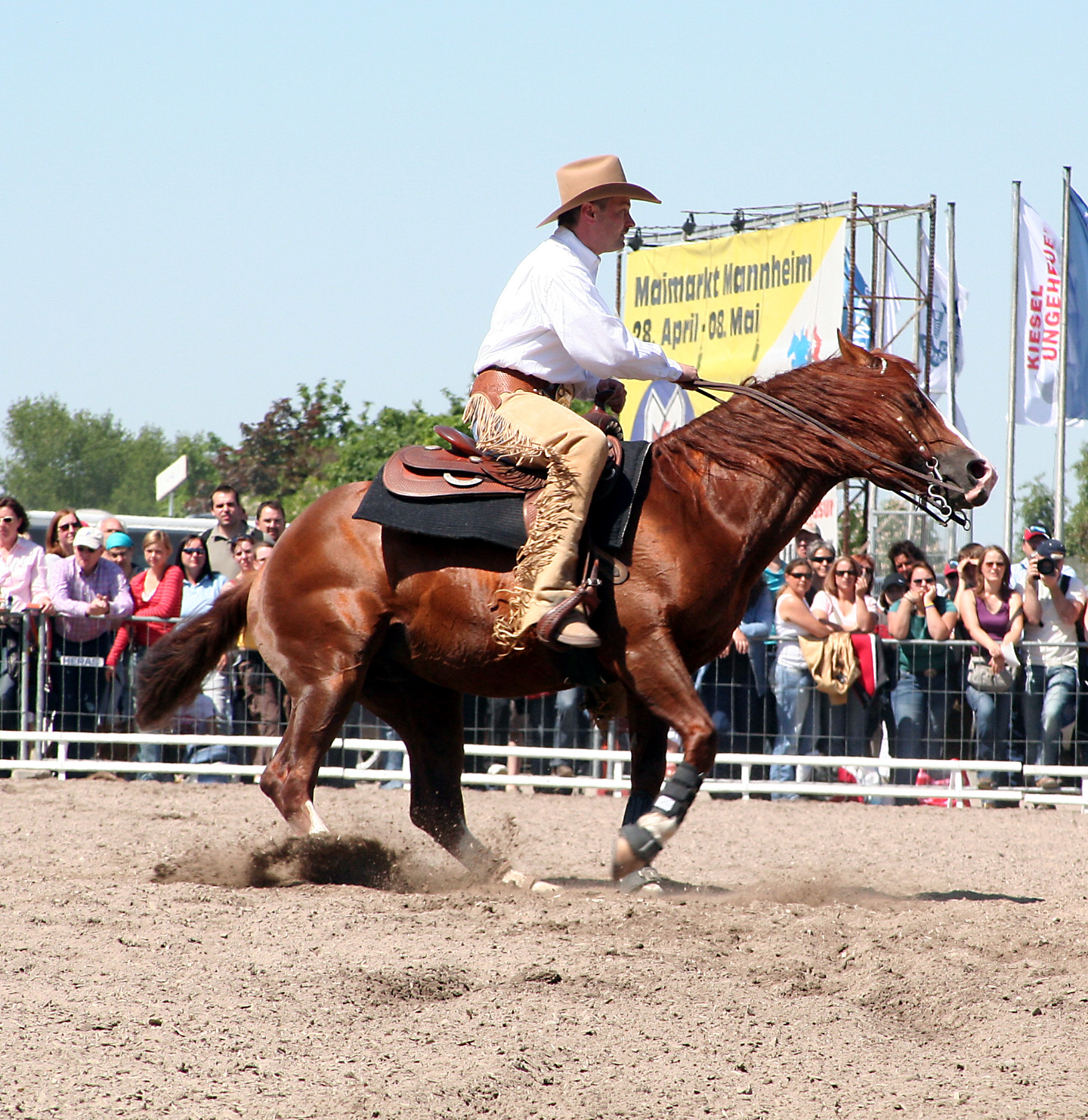
Shotgun chaps worn by the rider of a reining horse

Batwing chaps are cut wide with a flare at the bottom. Generally made of smooth leather, they have only two or three fasteners around the thigh, thus allowing great freedom of movement for the lower leg. This is helpful when riding very actively, and makes it easier to mount the horse. This design also provides more air circulation and is thus somewhat cooler for hot-weather wear. Batwing chaps are often seen on rodeo contestants, particularly those who ride bucking stock. They are also seen on working ranches, particularly in Texas. They were a later design, developed after the end of the open range. Although by definition the chaps that rodeo contestants wear are considered batwing chaps, contestants do not refer to them as batwings. They are simply called rodeo chaps. There are a few differences in design between working ranch batwing chaps and rodeo chaps. Rodeo chaps are usually more colorful and decorated, whereas ranch cowboys need toughness over style. Rodeo chaps have long flowing fringe which can be the same or a different color as the main body.

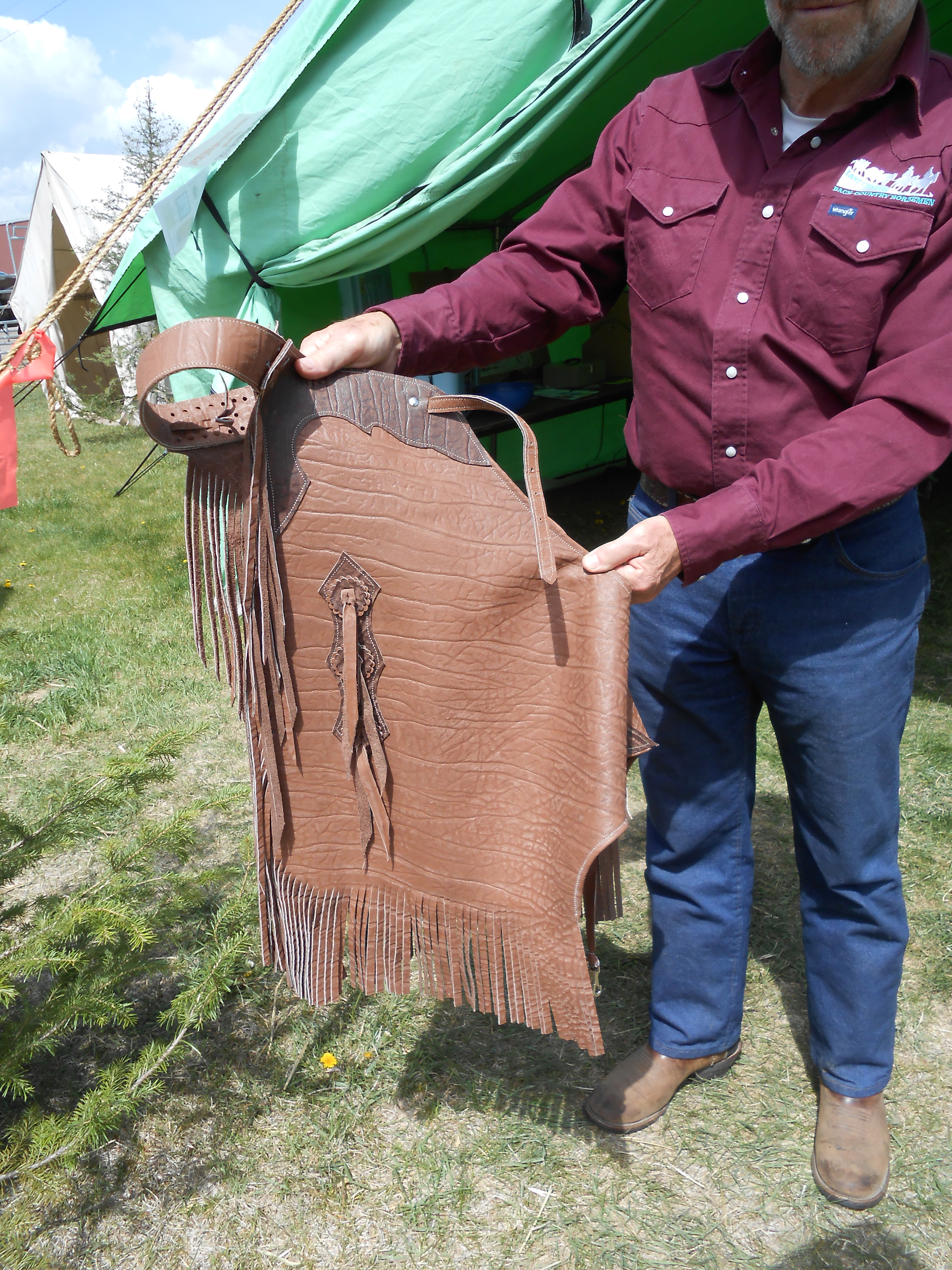
Chinks, fringe begins just below the rider's knee

Chinks are half-length chaps that stop two to four inches (5 to 10 cm) below the knee, with very long fringe at the bottom and along the sides. They are usually fringed along the outside edge and bottom, making their apparent length appear about 4 inches (10 cm) longer. The leg shape is cut somewhere between batwings and shotguns, and each leg usually has only two fasteners, high on the thigh. They are cooler to wear and hence a design that is suitable for very warm climates. They are occasionally called "half-chaps" (not to be confused with gaiters-style half chaps described below). The original etymon may have been chincaderos or chigaderos, and may have originally referred to armitas. Chinks are most often seen on cowboys in the Southwestern and Pacific states, most notably on those who follow the California vaquero or "buckaroo" tradition.

Armitas are believed to be an early style of chaps, supposedly developed by the Spanish in colonial Mexico and became associated with the "buckaroos" or vaqueros of the Great Basin area of what is now the United States, although there is no evidence of these and other types of chaparreras in Colonial Mexico. They are a short legging with completely closed legs that have to be put on in a manner similar to pants. They are sometimes a bit longer than chinks, but still stopping above the top of the boot, fringed on the sides and on the bottom to reach the boot tops, attached by a fringed belt.

A farrier's apron is a specialized style of chinks without fringe, also known as horse shoeing chaps. They protect the upper legs of farriers from getting scratched or cut up in the process of shoeing or otherwise treating the hooves of horses. Some designs have a breakaway front for safety while working. Farrier's aprons are also sometimes used by ranch hands when stacking hay to reduce wear on clothing.

Woolies, circa 1917

Woolies are a variation on shotgun chaps, made with a fleece or with hair-on cowhide, often angora, lined with canvas on the inside. They are the warmest chaps, associated with the northern plains and Rocky Mountains. They appeared on the Great Plains somewhere around 1887.

== Elsewhere ==
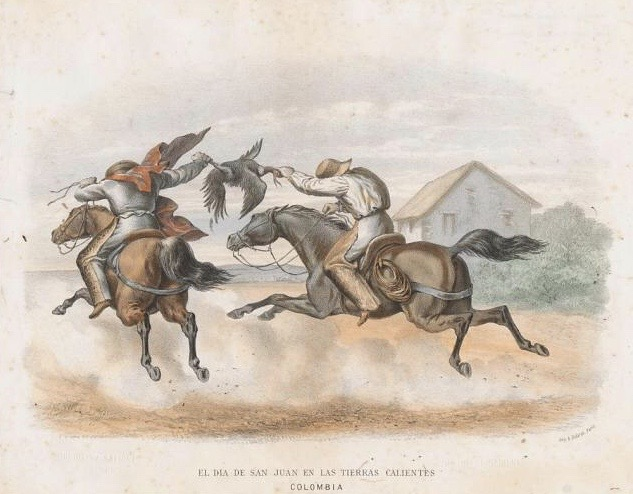
Colombian horsemen from the Hot Lands wearing zamarros (1860).

Zamarros somewhat resemble batwing chaps, in that the leggings are closely fitted at the thigh and flare out below the knee, but unlike batwings, the leggings extend far below the boot with a distinctive triangular flare. Zamarro or Zamarra, from the Basque language meaning "sheep fleece", was originally applied back in Spain to the wool coats and vests used by Spanish shepherds in the mountains of the Basque country. The term was introduced to the Americas with that definition, but around the 1840s (no mention of them before) the term was applied to the leggings made of wool or llama used by some horsemen in Colombia, Venezuela and Ecuador, and were originally intended, just like Mexican chaparreras, to protect the rider from the rain.

Modern Zamarro are commonly made of cowhide, either plain tanned leather or hides with the hair on. They are popular with Paso Fino aficionados, and are derived from styles seen in Colombia. Historically, the word zamorros simply referred to a basic shotgun-like style of either smooth or hair-on chaps worn by Colombian riders.

=== Iberian Zahones ===
Zahones, from the Arabic safn or sufun meaning apron or tablecloth, are aprons, not trousers, made of leather, that cover just the front of the legs to protect it from scratches. Before the 20th century, zahones were a lot shorter only covering the frontal area of the thighs down to the knees. They are distinct from chaparreras.

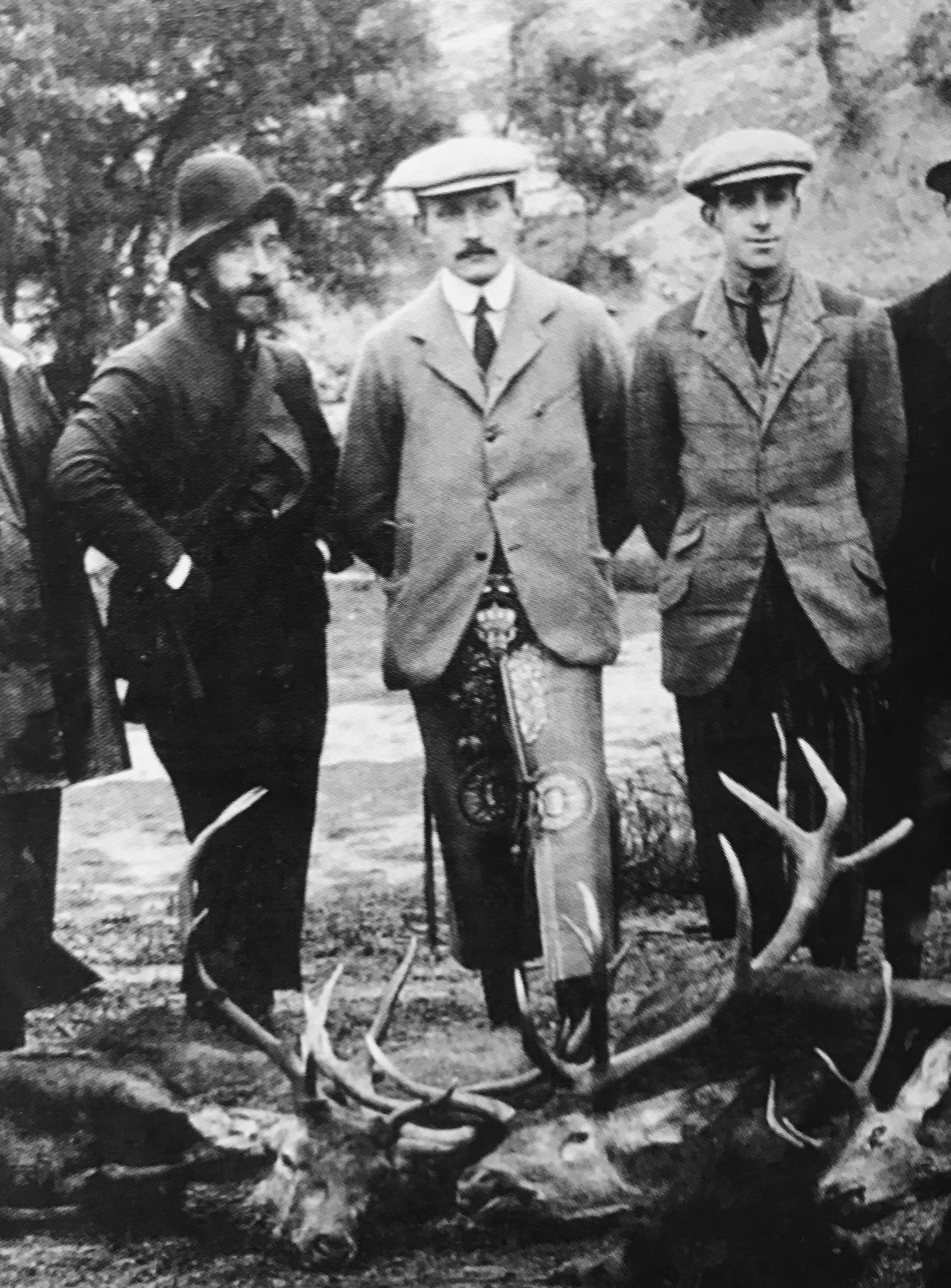
Prince Arthur of Connaught wearing traditional Spanish zahones at a montería in El Pardo, 1908. Alfonso XIII and the Duke of San Pedro de Galatino to his left and right respectively

According to Sebastián de Covarrubias, zahón and its variants zafón, safón or çahon, of Arabic origin, is a “wide, legging (...) or calzón or gregüesco .." The Arabic origin of the word is confirmed by Joan Coromines when citing the Portuguese word "açafôes." The Arabic etymology of the word zahón or zafón could be “safn” or “sufun”, which designates a “leather tablecloth and apron.“ In Spanish, apron (mandil) and tablecloth (mantel) have the same etymology. The first Dictionary of the Royal Academy of the Spanish Language (1726-1739) defines Zahón as : "A type of wide breeches, also called zafón. In some parts, it only corresponds to the front, for riding a horse." Leopoldo Eguílaz defines it as: "Breeches open on both sides, that do not go beyond the calf, made of sheepskin, cowhide, deerskin." Luis Marty Caballero defines it as: "A kind of leather apron tied at the waist and on each of the thighs.

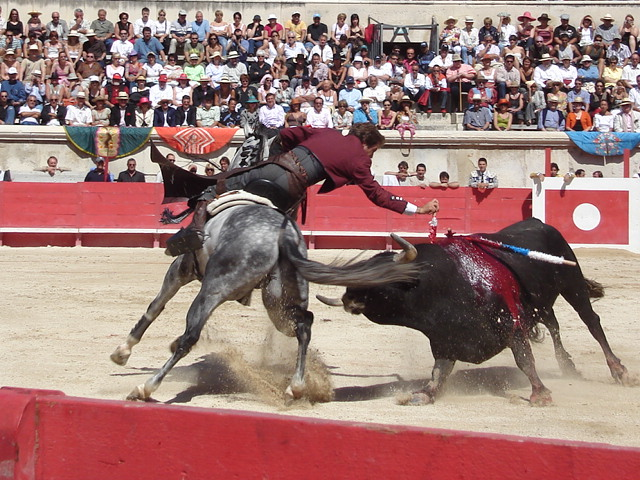
Rejoneador wearing zahones. Modern zahones are longer, covering the front of the legs to below the knee.

Zahones worn by campinos in Portugal during the 1950s were sheepskin or goatskin with the wool or hair on and of a "drainpipe" style, while in Spain, zahones were without hair and feature intricately worked designs called "poker-work." In Spain today, rejoneadores wear smooth zahones attached with a single strap behind the knee. They are also worn in monterías, either in their leather or Grazalema variations.

=== Uses ===
Chaps are intended to protect the legs of cowboys from contact with daily environmental hazards seen in working with cattle, horses and other livestock. They help to protect riders' legs from scraping on brush, injury from thorns of cacti, sagebrush, mesquite and other thorny vegetation. Chaps are also useful for other types of riding. Leather chaps stick to a leather saddle or a bareback horse better than do fabric trousers and thus help the rider stay on. They are worn by rodeo competitors in "rough stock" events, including bull riding, saddle bronc and bareback riding. Riders in other disciplines, including various styles of English riding, sometimes wear chaps while schooling horses.

Chaps are commonly worn by western riders at horse shows, where contestants are required to adhere to traditional forms of clothing, albeit with more decorative touches than seen in working designs. Currently chaps are also worn as a fashion choice for equestrian training and clinics. Chaps may now include contrast seams, elastic for better fit and crystal detailing. Chaps are often required by show rules, and even when optional under the rules are often worn to give a "finished" look to an outfit. Fashions change periodically and styles vary between the assorted sub-disciplines within western-style riding

== Non-equestrian chaps ==
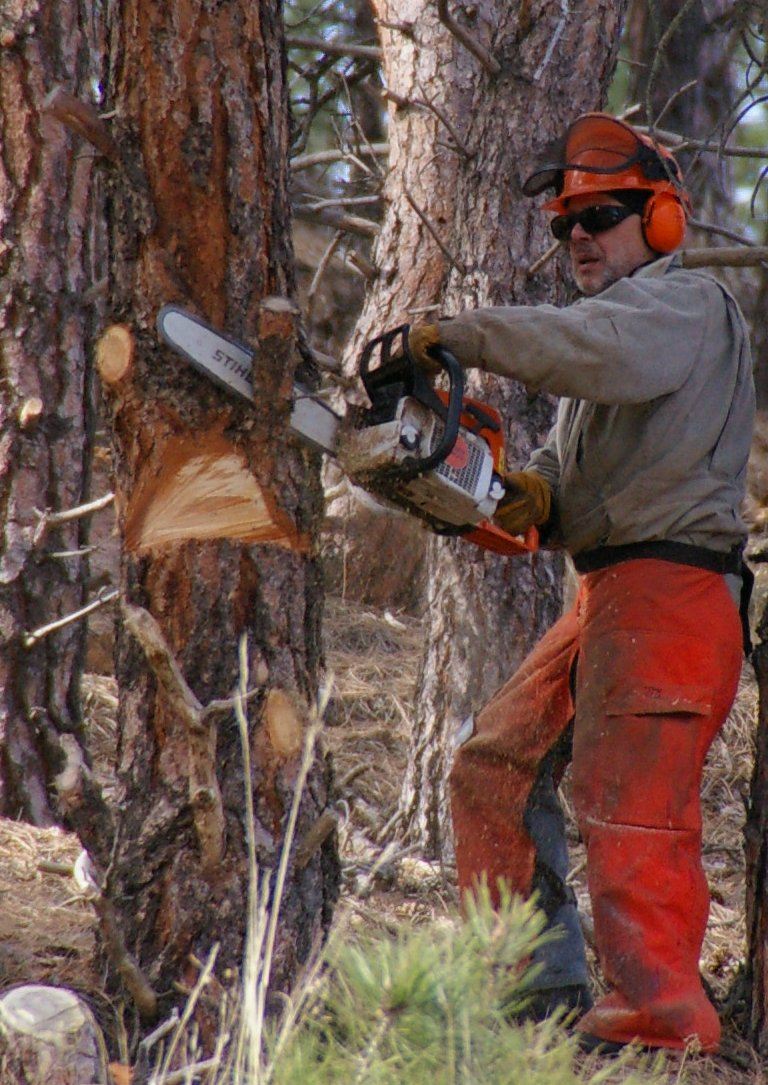
Chainsaw chaps

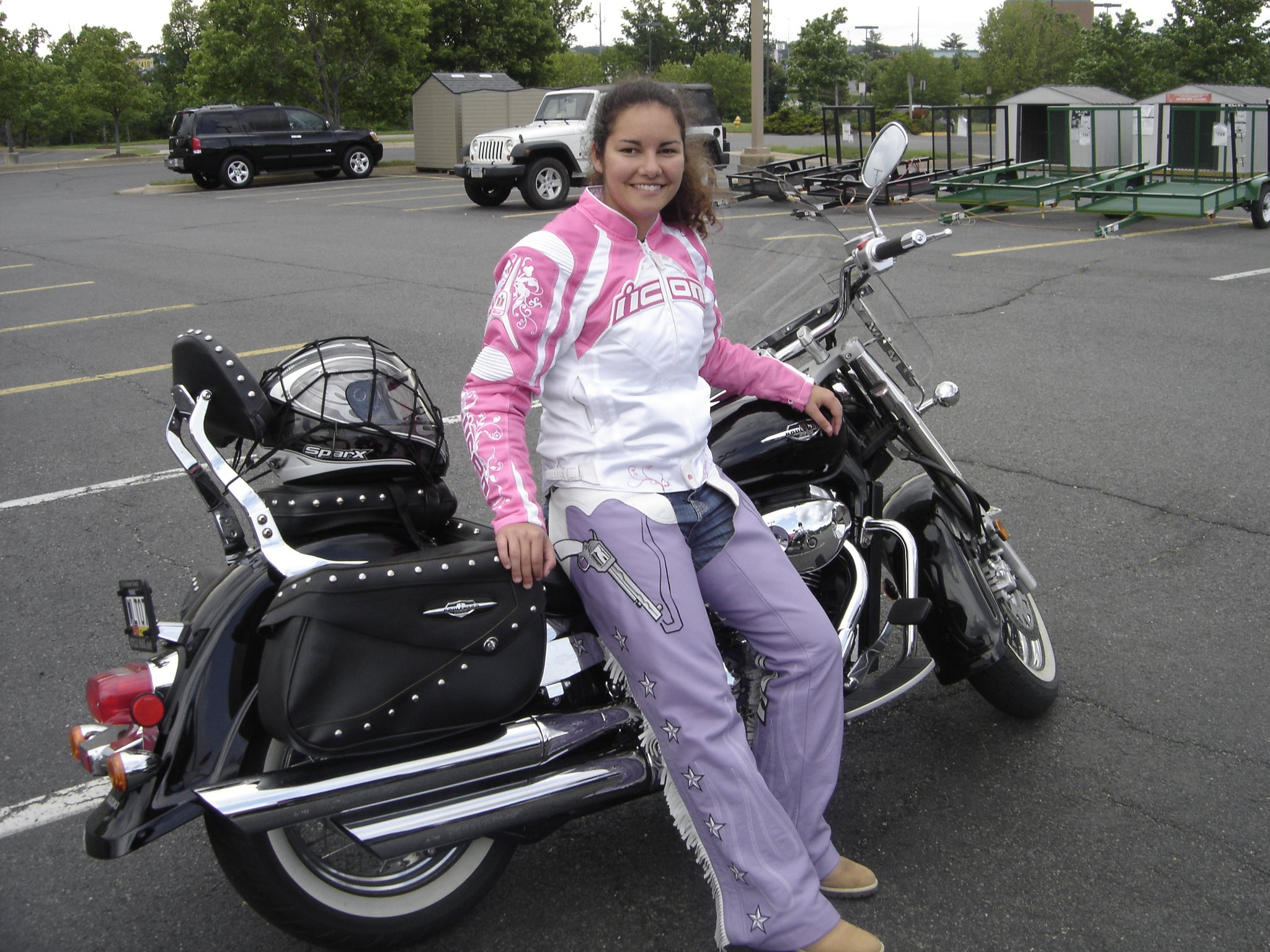
Motorcycle chaps

Chainsaw chaps are a component of chainsaw safety clothing. They are made of strong materials like kevlar and protect the legs from injury. A similar style, though of different materials, is sold to hunters and other outdoor sportsmen for protection from rattlesnake bites. Outside of snake country, bird hunters often wear "upland chaps" made of waxed cotton or nylon to protect their legs from briars and thorns. Use of upland chaps allows any type of pants to be worn in the field and they are also used to protect rain suits.

Motorcycle chaps are a type of motorcycle safety clothing and are an example of the shotgun style. They are usually made of leather with the smooth side out, and generally provide all-around protection for the leg and have side zippers to allow them to be put on easily. They are popular in the biker subculture, providing protection from the wind and cold as well as partial protection from cuts and scrapes in the event of a fall to the roadway.

Chaps are also popular in fetish fashion and the leather subculture, where they often are tightly fitted and worn without jeans or other garments layered beneath them other than a codpiece. They can be made of leather, patent leather, rubber, or vinyl and are worn for decoration serving no protective purpose. Worn in this manner, they are colloquially referred to as "assless" chaps, despite the redundancy of the term (all chaps are "assless"; chaps with a seat would be called trousers). More often, this style of chaps are referred to as "bar" chaps.

== Materials and construction ==
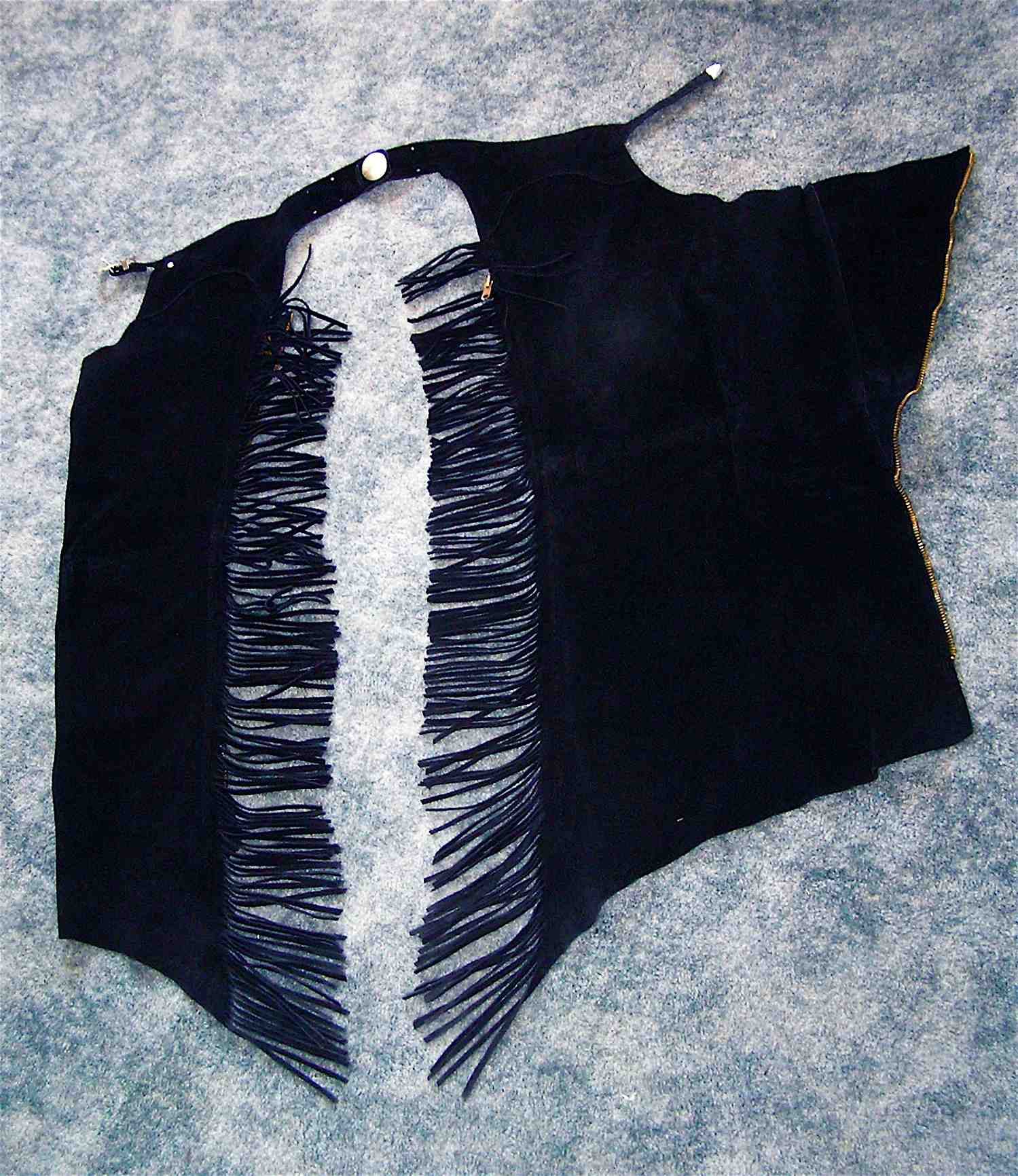
A pair of suede shotgun chaps designed for horse show use. Left leg is closed as it would be when worn, right leg is opened out to show construction.

Equestrian chaps, with the exception of woolies, are traditionally made of cowhide. Woolies, some Zamorros, and a few other historic or ethnic styles may be made with the hair or wool still on the hide, usually cowhide, sheepskin, or Angora goat skin. Historically, they also included seal, bear, and buffalo.

Leather for chaps is tanned and dyed, and the hide is usually "split" so that the leather is supple and can be made into a garment that allows easy movement. There is a rough side, what is today called suede or "roughout", and a smooth side. Chaps are made in both "roughout" and "smooth out" (smooth side out) designs. Most batwings and chinks are made smooth side out, most shotguns are suede, or roughout. For horse shows, where fashions may change from year to year and durability is not as great a concern, lighter, synthetic materials such as ultrasuede and vinyl may be used, though leather suede or a smooth split predominates due to durability and proper fit. In Australia, chaps may be made of oilskin rather than leather.

Most chaps, with the exception of Armitas (which have no metal parts), usually have a small metal buckle in front to attach around the waist, and have lacing on the back of the belt area to allow adjustment in size. A few designs lace in the front and buckle in the back, but they are not often seen. The sides of some designs, particularly the batwing style, either have straps and relatively small metal buckles or snaps to attach the legging around the rider's leg. Other styles, particularly shotguns, usually use full-length heavy-duty metal zippers. Some historic styles of riding chaps used a single break-away leather string or lace instead of a front buckle. The original purpose was to break away if a rider's chaps' belt somehow became hooked over the saddle horn.

Except for the batwing design, most chaps are fringed along the edge of the leg, usually a fringe of the same leather as the legging, though occasionally a contrasting color of leather may be added. Chinks and Armitas have fringe on the bottom of the leg as well. The belt that holds on a pair of the chaps may be the same color of leather or of a contrasting color, sometimes is fringed in the back for show, but usually not on a working outfit. Decorative leather designs or fancy stitching may be added along the edge of bottom of the leg or to the belt, and even sterling silver pieces may be used for buckles, and on round decorative metal conchos placed to cover the lacing on the back of the belt, or occasionally even at the bottom of the legging, by the heel.

== Half chaps ==
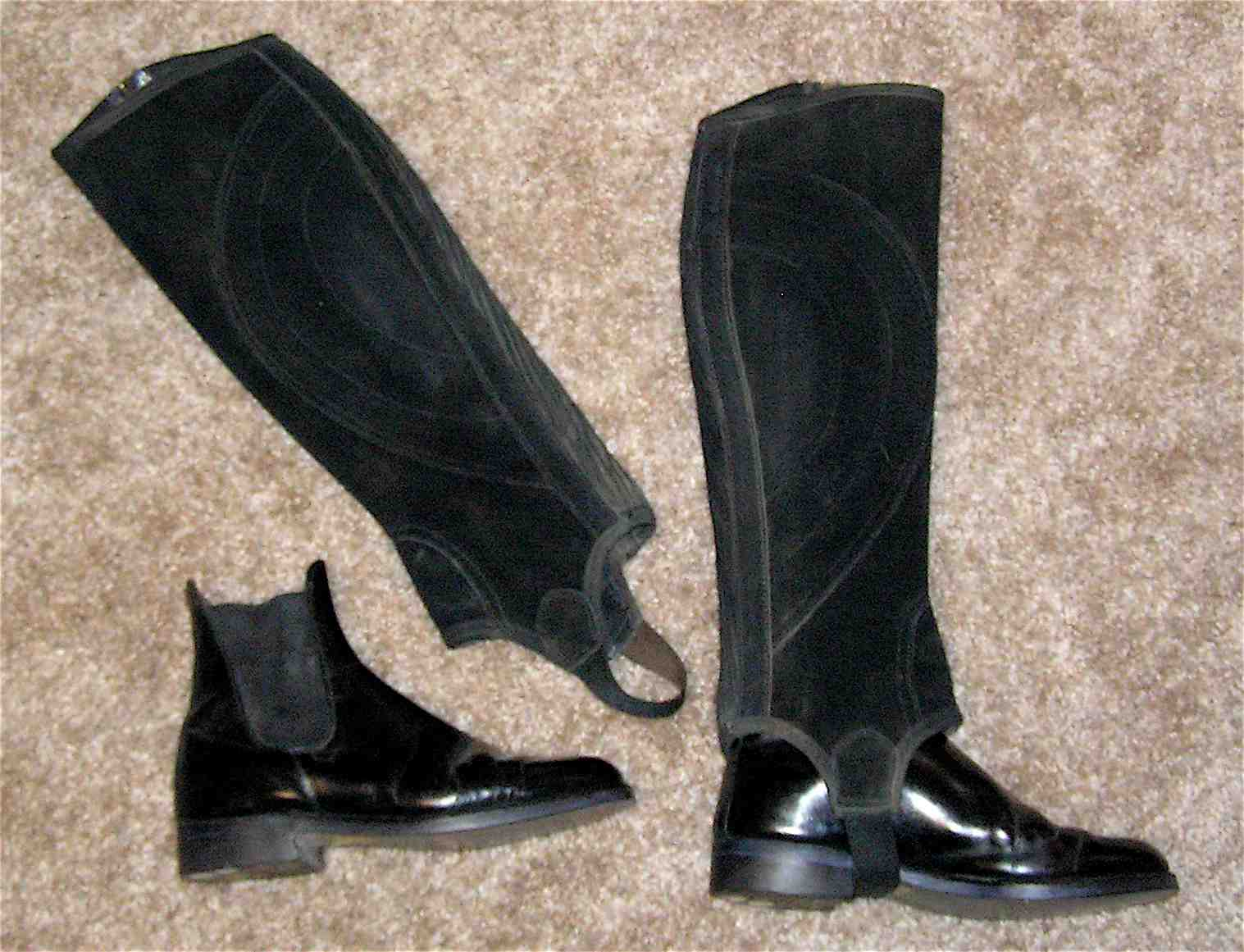
Half chaps and jodhpur boots

Half chaps, also known as chapettes, are a popular style of equestrian gaiters that extend from the ankle to just below the knee. When worn over a short paddock boot they give the protection and some of the appearance of a tall riding boot, but at lower cost. They are widely worn by children in horse shows and by trail riders. Half chaps usually are made of leather, and have a zipper or hook and loop closure on the outside. They provide grip for the rider, and protection from sweat and the stirrup leather. They are commonly used over the paddock boots of English-style riders in place of tall boots. While not true chaps, some Western-style riders use half chaps, particularly in hot weather, but gaiter-style half chaps are not traditional cowboy gear.

== Fitting ==
Chaps are usually worn over denim jeans or other trousers of heavy material. They have their own belt, and usually are fitted around the hips, resting below the belt loops of the trousers. Except for chinks and armitas, which are designed to fit above the boot, most chaps are long, fitting over the boot and draping slightly over the vamp of the boot (see shoe). Some designs are cut to hang long at the heel and nearly cover the entire boot except for the toe. Batwings, chinks, and shotgun chaps fit firmly but comfortably around the thigh, with shotguns continuing to fit closely all the way down the calf, though not so snug as to limit free knee movement. The shotgun design is a bit flared at the ankle to allow for the rider's boot. Batwings and chinks are not attached around the leg below the knee.

== See also ==
- Buckskins
- Personal protective equipment
- Shin guard
