= Petticoat breeches =

Full, knee-length trousers worn by men in the 17th–18th centuries

Petticoat breeches were voluminously wide, pleated pants, reminiscent of a skirt, worn by men in Western Europe during the 1650s and early 1670s. The very full loose breeches were usually decorated with loops of ribbons on the waist and around the knee. They were so loose and wide that they became known as petticoat breeches. They give very much the impression of very baggy loose shorts since they are not gathered at the knee.

They replaced Spanish breeches during the 1650s as the most popular leg wear of most of Western Europe. By the early 1660s, if they were gathered at the bottom they were called rhinegraves.

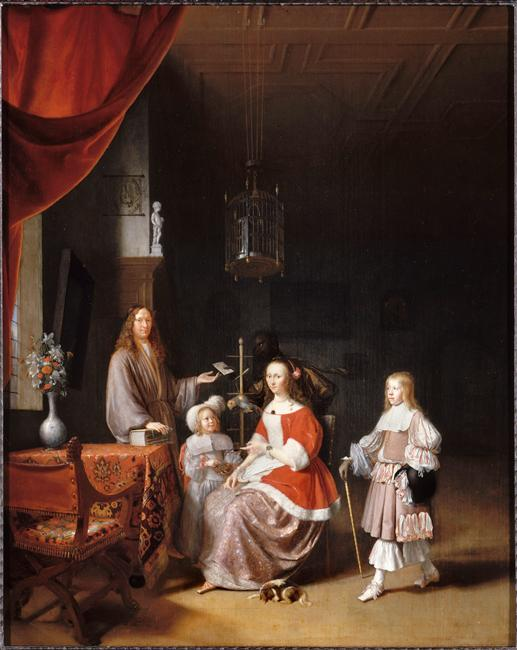
Gerard Jansz Meerman wearing petticoat breeches, 1668

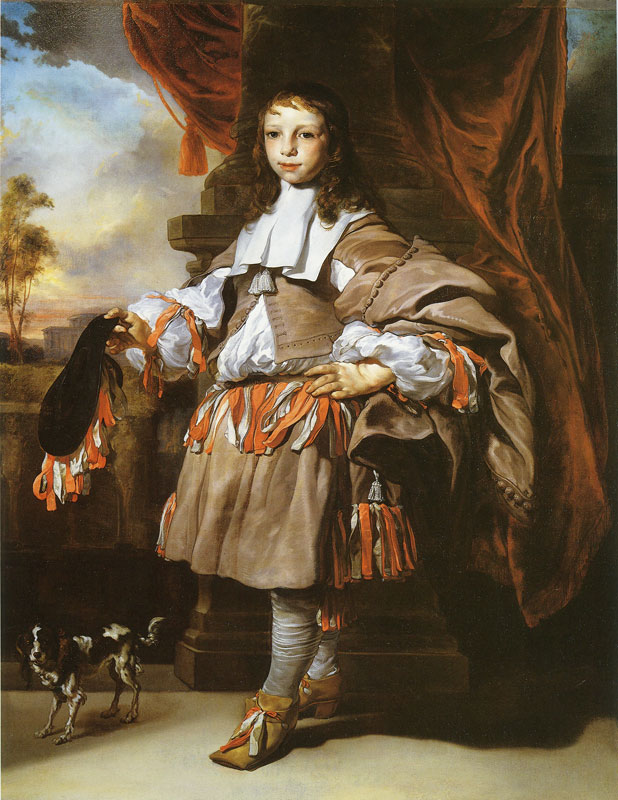
Portrait of a Boy, by Jan van Noordt, 1665

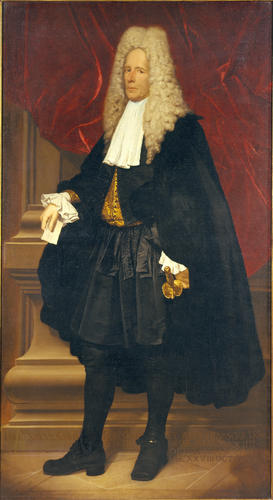
Portrait of Count Girolamo Secco Suardo, by Fra' Galgario, 1721
