= Spanish breeches =

Short breeches worn by European men in the 16th and 17th centuries

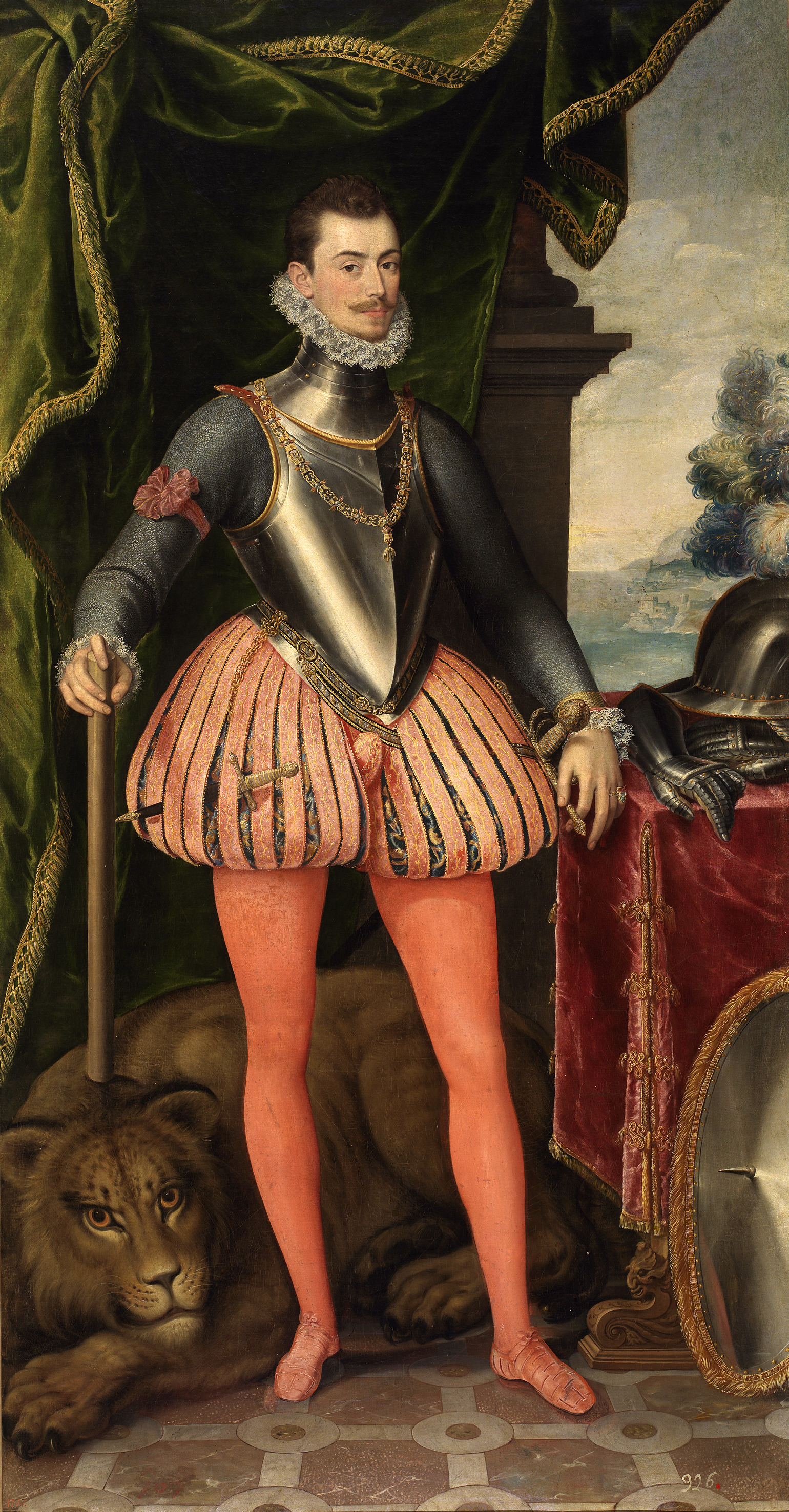
- Juan de Austria with Spanish breeches and codpiece, 1572
- Type: Breeches
- Place of origin: Spain
- Introduced: 16th century

Spanish breeches (gregüescos in Spanish) are a type of breeches or trousers for men, short, baggy (harem pants) and ungathered, usually accompanied by a codpiece. Possibly of military origin, they were in fashion in Spain during the 16th century to the 17th.

After that period, they adopted different forms and lengths in Western Europe and the Spanish overseas courts, as an evolution of botargas and other types of hose or pantaloons evolving then to follados or afuellados. They were described – in their varied typology – or ridiculed, by some of the best writers of the Spanish Golden Age, such as Lope de Vega, Tirso de Molina or Francisco de Quevedo; and painted by Diego Velázquez, Murillo or Alonso Sánchez Coello, among other artists from the major European courts, as Titian.

== See also ==
- Petticoat breeches
- 1600–1650 in fashion
- 1650–1700 in fashion
