= Nine Years' War =

War between France and a European coalition (1688–1697)

- Part of the Anglo-French Wars and the French–Habsburg rivalry
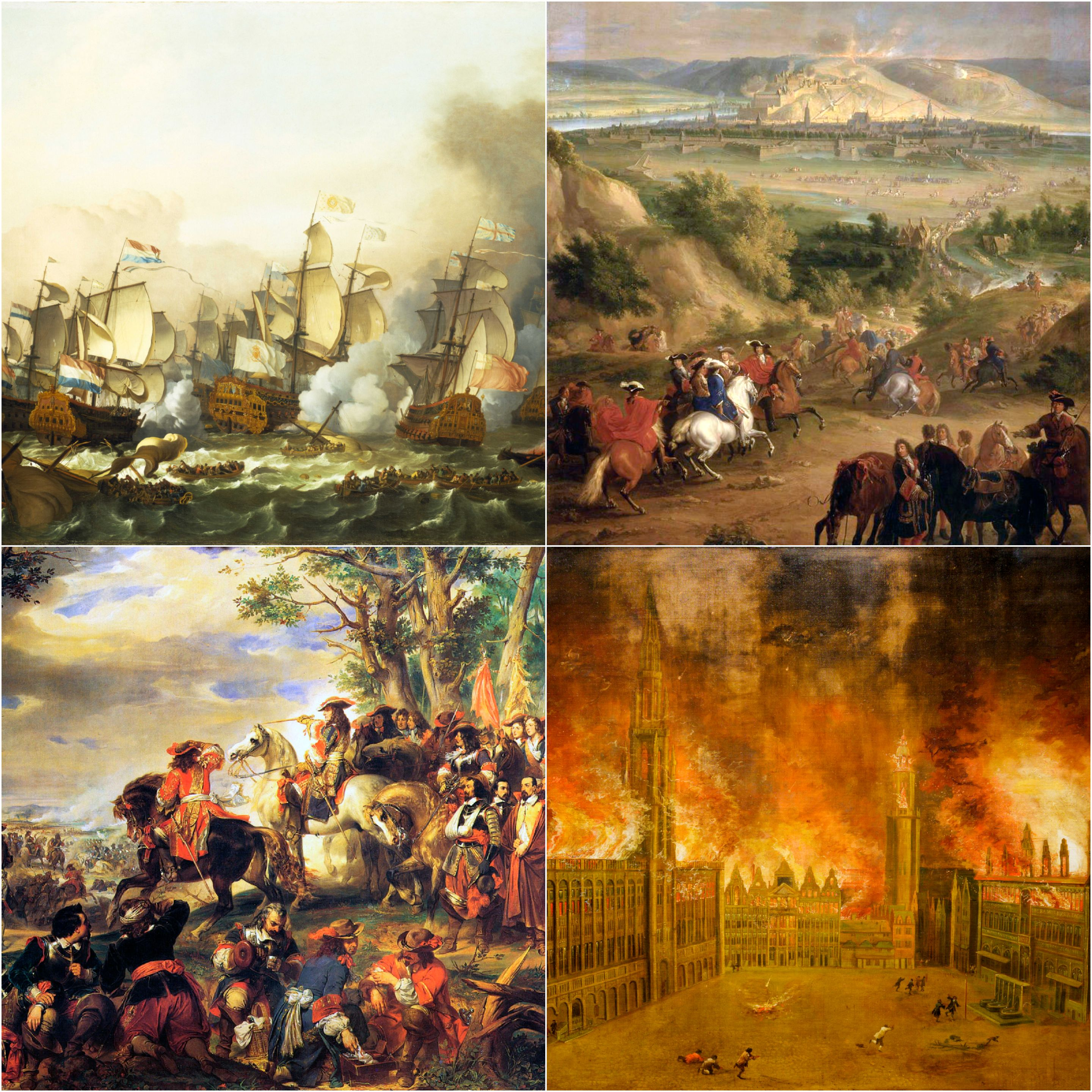
- Left to right: Action at Barfleur; Siege of Namur; Battle of Marsaglia; Bombardment of Brussels
Date	27 September 1688 – 20 September 1697 (8 years, 358 days)
Location	Mainland Europe, Ireland, Scotland, North America
Result	Peace of Ryswick
Territorial changes	France returns Luxembourg and Kortrijk to Spain, Freiburg, Breisach, and Kehl to the Holy Roman Empire, and Lorraine to Duke Leopold; Dutch Republic gains the right to garrison troops in the Spanish Netherlands (Note: Ath, Mons, Kortrijk, Charleroi, Namur, Nieuwpoort, Oudenaarde and Luxembourg)

Belligerents
Grand Alliance: Dutch Republic; England; Scotland; Holy Roman Empire; Spanish Empire; Savoyard State	Kingdom of France; Jacobites

Commanders and leaders
(Dutch Republic) (Kingdom of England) (Kingdom of Scotland) William III/II; (Kingdom of England) (Kingdom of Scotland) Mary II #; (Dutch Republic) (Kingdom of England) Bentinck; (Dutch Republic) Heinsius; (Dutch Republic) Waldeck; (Dutch Republic) Athlone; (Dutch Republic) Coehoorn; (Dutch Republic) Evertsen; (Dutch Republic) Almonde; (Dutch Republic) (Kingdom of England) Schomberg †; (Kingdom of England) Herbert; (Kingdom of England) Russell; (Kingdom of England) Rooke; (Kingdom of England) Berkeley; (Holy Roman Empire) Leopold I; (Holy Roman Empire) Charles V of Lorraine; (Holy Roman Empire) Maximilian II Emanuel; (Holy Roman Empire) Baden; (Holy Roman Empire) Frederick I; (Holy Roman Empire) Eugene; (Duchy of Savoy) Victor Amadeus II; (Spain) Charles II; (Spain) Gastañaga; (Spain) Villahermosa	(Kingdom of France) Louis XIV; (Kingdom of France) Louvois; (Kingdom of France) Croissy; (Kingdom of France) Luxembourg; (Kingdom of France) Vauban; (Kingdom of France) Villeroi; (Kingdom of France) Boufflers; (Kingdom of France) Lorges; (Kingdom of France) Catinat; (Kingdom of France) Noailles; (Kingdom of France) Duras; (Kingdom of France) Vendôme; (Kingdom of France) Caumont; (Kingdom of France) St Ruth †; (Kingdom of France) Humières; (Kingdom of France) Tourville; (Kingdom of France) Jean Bart; James II; Tyrconnell

Strength
(Dutch Republic) : 102,000; (Kingdom of England) (Kingdom of Scotland) : 102,000 (Note: The British kingdoms never deployed more than 55,000 of their troops on the continent. The number also includes 11,000 Dutch troops who were in English pay from 1689 to 1697.); (Holy Roman Empire) : 127,410 (annual average) (Note: 57,410 Imperial, 70,000 Habsburg); (Spain) : 50,000; (Duchy of Savoy) : 24,500; Naval peak strength; (Kingdom of England) : 112 ships of the line; : 72 ships of the line	(Kingdom of France) 362,000; : 36,000–39,000; Naval peak strength; (Kingdom of France) : 119 ships of the line

Casualties and losses
- 680,000 military deaths (Note: The British suffered 20,000 military deaths outside of Ireland, excluding foreign auxiliaries in British pay.) The Great French famine of 1693-1694 would occur during this war and would result in 700,000-1,300,000 deaths

The Nine Years' War (Note: Also known as War of the Grand Alliance, War of the League of Augsburg, War of the Palatine Succession, or War of the English Succession) was a European great power conflict from 1688 to 1697 between France and the Grand Alliance. (Note: A coalition that included the Holy Roman Empire, the Dutch Republic, England, Spain and Savoy) Fought primarily in Europe, related conflicts include the Williamite War in Ireland, and King William's War in North America.

The 1678 Treaty of Nijmegen that ended the Franco-Dutch War was the highpoint of the French expansionist policies pursued by Louis XIV. Over the next few years, he continued attempts to strengthen France's frontiers, culminating in the 1683 to 1684 War of the Reunions. The Truce of Ratisbon guaranteed these new borders for twenty years, but concerns among European Protestant states over French expansion and anti-Protestant policies led to the creation of the Grand Alliance, headed by William of Orange.

In September 1688 Louis led an army across the Rhine to seize additional territories beyond it. This move was designed to extend his influence and pressure the Holy Roman Empire into accepting his territorial and dynastic claims. However, Holy Roman Emperor Leopold I and German princes supported the Dutch in opposing French aims, while the Glorious Revolution of November 1688 secured English resources and support for the Alliance. Over the next few years, fighting focused around the Spanish Netherlands, the Rhineland, the Duchy of Savoy, and Catalonia. Although engagements generally favoured Louis' armies, neither side was able to gain a significant advantage, and by 1696 the main belligerents were financially exhausted, making them keen to negotiate a settlement.

Under the terms of the 1697 Peace of Ryswick, French control over the entirety of Alsace was officially recognized, but Lorraine and gains on the right bank of the Rhine were relinquished and restored to their rulers. Louis XIV also recognised William III as the rightful king of England, while the Dutch acquired barrier fortresses in the Spanish Netherlands to help secure their borders and were granted a favorable commercial treaty, and Spain regained Luxembourg and other territories from France. However, both sides viewed the peace as only a pause in hostilities, since it failed to resolve who would succeed the ailing and childless Charles II of Spain as ruler of the Spanish Empire, a question that had dominated European politics for over 30 years. This would lead to the War of the Spanish Succession in 1701.

== Background: 1677 – early 1688 ==
In the years following the Franco-Dutch War (1672–1677), Louis XIV of France, now at the height of his power, sought to impose religious unity in France and to solidify and expand his frontiers. He had already won personal glory by conquering new territory, but he was no longer willing to pursue an open-ended militarist policy of the kind that he had undertaken in 1672. Instead, he would rely upon France's clear military superiority to achieve specific strategic objectives along his borders. Proclaimed the "Sun King", a more mature Louis, conscious that he had failed to achieve decisive results against the Dutch, had turned from conquest to security by using threats, rather than open war, to intimidate his neighbours into submission.

Louis XIV, along with his chief military advisor, Louvois, his foreign minister, Colbert de Croissy, and his technical expert, Vauban, developed France's defensive strategy. Vauban had advocated a system of impregnable fortresses along the frontier to keep France's enemies out. To construct a proper system, however, the King needed to acquire more land from his neighbours to form a solid forward line. That rationalisation of the frontier would make it far more defensible and define it more clearly in a political sense, but it also created the paradox that while Louis's ultimate goals were defensive, he pursued them by offensive means. He grabbed the necessary territory in the Reunions, a strategy that combined legalism, arrogance and aggression.

=== Reunions ===
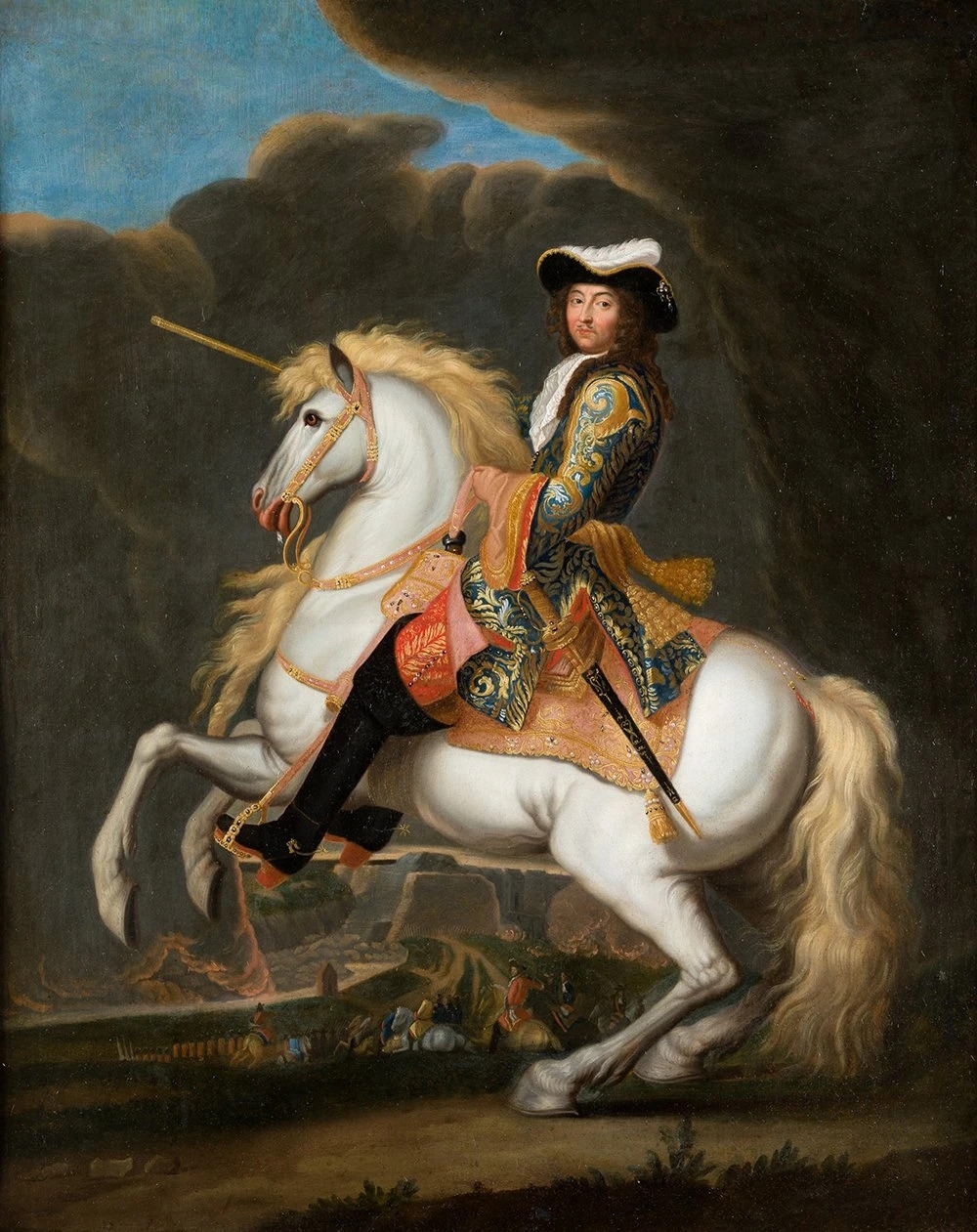
Equestrian portrait of Louis XIV (1638–1715) by René-Antoine Houasse. The Sun King was the most powerful monarch in Europe.

The Treaties of Nijmegen (1667) and the earlier Peace of Westphalia (1649) provided Louis XIV with the justification for the Reunions. These treaties had awarded France territorial gains, but owing to the vagaries of their language (as with most treaties of the time) they were notoriously imprecise and self-contradictory, and never specified exact boundary lines. That imprecision often led to differing interpretations of the text and resulted in long disputes over frontier zones, where one side might gain a town or area and its "dependencies", but it was often unclear what the dependencies were. The machinery needed to determine the territorial ambiguities was already in place through the medium of the parlements at Metz (technically, the only Chamber of Reunion), Besançon and a superior court at Breisach, dealing respectively with Lorraine, Franche-Comté and Alsace. The courts usually found in Louis XIV's favour. By 1682, the disputed County of Montbéliard, lying between Franche-Comté and Alsace, had been separated from the Duchy of Württemberg, and by August, Louis XIV had secured the whole of Alsace with the exception of Strasbourg. The Chamber of Reunion of Metz soon laid claims to land around the Three Bishoprics of Metz, Toul and Verdun and most of the Spanish Duchy of Luxembourg. The fortress of Luxembourg City itself was then blockaded with the intention of it becoming part of his defensible frontier.

Holy Roman Emperor Leopold I (1640–1705), artist unknown

On 30 September 1685, French troops also seized Strasbourg and its outpost, Kehl, on the right bank of the Rhine, a bridge that Holy Roman Empire ("imperial") troops had regularly exploited during the latter stages of the Dutch War. By forcibly taking the imperial city, the French now controlled two of the three bridgeheads over the Rhine, the others being Breisach, which was already in French hands, and Philippsburg, which Louis XIV had lost by the Treaty of Nijmegen. On the same day that Strasbourg fell, French forces marched into Casale, in northern Italy. The fortress was not taken in the process of the Reunions but had been purchased from the Duke of Mantua, which, together with the French possession of Pinerolo, enabled France to tie down Victor Amadeus II, the Duke of Savoy, and to threaten the Spanish Duchy of Milan. (Note: Piedmont was now hemmed in by two massive French-occupied fortresses: Casale on the eastern flank and, on its western edge, Pinerolo, which had been annexed by France 50 years earlier in defiance of the 1631 Treaty of Cherasco.) All of the Reunion claims and annexations were important strategic points of entry and exit between France and its neighbours and were immediately fortified by Vauban and incorporated into his fortress system.

Thus, the Reunions carved territory from the frontiers of present-day Germany, and the annexations established French power in Italy. However, by seeking to construct his impregnable border, Louis XIV so alarmed the other European states that a general war, which he had sought to avoid, became inevitable. His fortresses covered his frontiers but also projected French power. Only two statesmen might hope to oppose Louis XIV. One was William III of Orange, the stadtholder of the United Provinces of the Dutch Republic, the natural leader of Protestant opposition, and the other was Holy Roman Emperor Leopold I, the leader of anti-French forces in the Holy Roman Empire and Catholic Europe. Both wanted to act, but effective opposition in 1681–1682 was out of the question since Amsterdam's burghers wanted no further conflict with France, and both were fully aware of the current weaknesses of Spain and the empire, whose important German princes from Mainz, Trier, Cologne, Saxony, Bavaria and (significantly) Frederick William I of Brandenburg remained in the pay of France.

=== Fighting on two fronts ===
Ever since Leopold I's intervention in the Franco-Dutch War, Louis XIV considered him his most dangerous enemy, although there was little reason to fear him. Leopold I was weak and was in grave danger along his Hungarian borders, where the Ottoman Turks were threatening to overrun all of Central Europe from the south. Louis had encouraged and assisted the Ottoman drive against Leopold I's Habsburg lands and he assured the Porte that he would not support the Emperor. He had also urged John III Sobieski of Poland, unsuccessfully, against siding with Leopold I and pressed the malcontent princes of Transylvania and Hungary to join with the Sultan's forces and free their territory from Habsburg rule. When the Ottomans besieged Vienna in the spring of 1683, Louis did nothing to help the defenders.

Taking advantage of the Ottoman threat in the east, Louis invaded the Spanish Netherlands on 1 September 1683 and renewed the siege of Luxembourg, which had been abandoned the previous year. (Note: With the growing Ottoman threat in the east, Louis XIV, the Most Christian King, had deemed it impolitic, cynically to some, for him to continue the assault in 1682, which could be seen as aiding the infidel.) The French required of the Emperor and of Charles II of Spain a recognition of the legality of the recent Reunions, but the Spanish were unwilling to see any more of their holdings fall under Louis's jurisdiction. Spain's military options were highly limited, but the Ottoman defeat at Vienna on 12 September had emboldened it. In the hope that Leopold I would now make peace in the east and come to his assistance, Charles II declared war on France on 26 October. However, the Emperor had decided to continue the Turkish war in the Balkans and to compromise in the west for the time being. With Leopold I unwilling to fight on two fronts, a strong neutralist party in the Dutch Republic tying William's hands and the Elector of Brandenburg stubbornly holding to his alliance with Louis, no possible outcome could occur but complete French victory.

The War of the Reunions was brief and devastating. With the fall of Courtrai in early November, followed by Dixmude in December and Luxembourg in June 1684, Charles II was compelled to accept Louis XIV's peace. The Truce of Ratisbon (Regensburg), signed on 15 August by France on one side and by the Emperor and Spain on the other, rewarded the French with Strasbourg, Luxembourg and the gains of the Reunion (Courtrai and Dixmude were returned to Spain). The resolution was not a definitive peace but only a truce for 20 years. However, Louis had sound reasons to feel satisfied since the Emperor and German princes were fully occupied in Hungary, and in the Dutch Republic, William of Orange remained isolated and powerless, largely because of the pro-French mood in Amsterdam.

=== Persecution of Huguenots ===
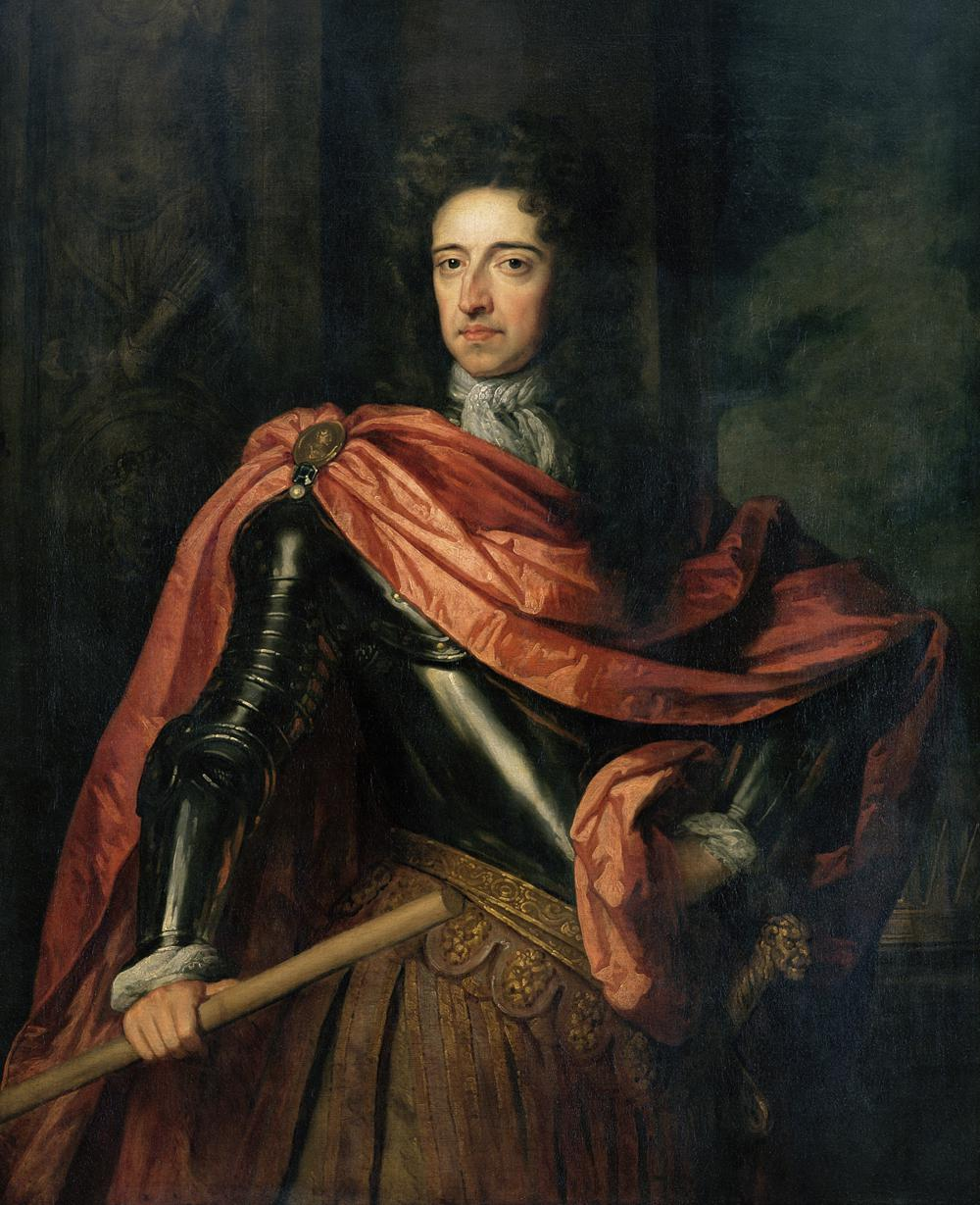
William of Orange (1650–1702), portrayed here as King William III of England by Sir Godfrey Kneller.

At Ratisbon in 1684, France had been in a position to impose its will on Europe; however, after 1685, its dominant military and diplomatic position began to deteriorate. One of the main factors for the diminution was Louis XIV's revocation of the Edict of Nantes, which caused the dispersal of France's Protestant community. As many as 200,000 Huguenots fled to England, the Dutch Republic, Switzerland, and Germany, and spread tales of brutality at the hands of the monarch of Versailles. The direct effect on France of the loss of the community is debatable, but the flight helped destroy the pro-French faction in the Dutch Republic because of its Protestant affiliations, and the exodus of Huguenot merchants and the harassment of Dutch merchants living in France also greatly affected Franco-Dutch trade. The persecution had another effect on Dutch public opinion since the conduct of the Catholic King of France made them look more anxiously at James II, now the Catholic King of England. Many in The Hague believed that James II was closer to his cousin Louis XIV than to his son-in-law and nephew William, which engendered suspicion and, in turn, hostility between Louis and William. Louis's seemingly endless territorial claims, coupled with his persecution of Protestants, enabled William of Orange and his party to gain the ascendancy in the Dutch Republic and finally lay the groundwork for his long-sought alliance against France.

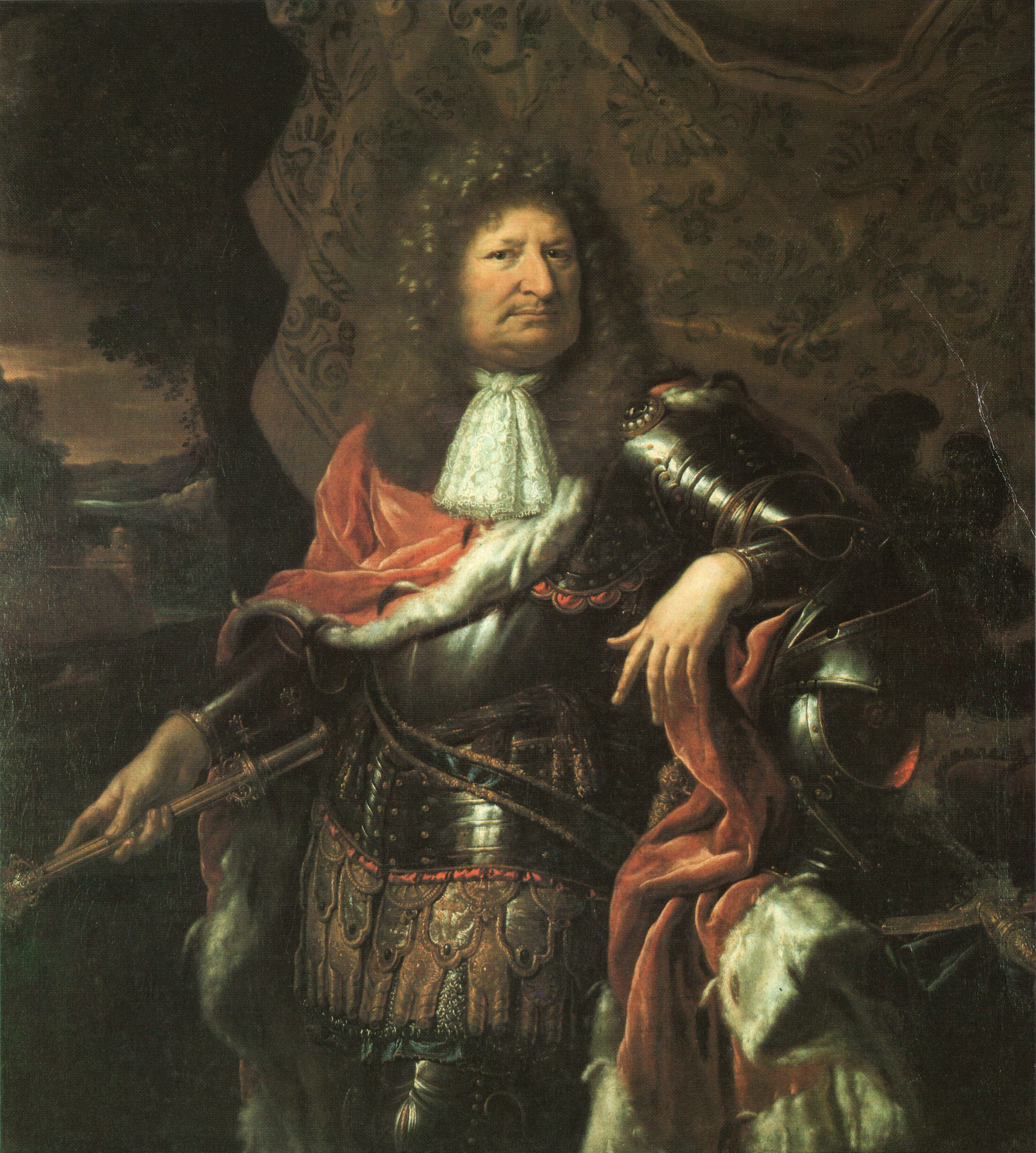
Frederick William, Elector of Brandenburg (1620–1688). He was succeeded by his son, Frederick, who proved to be one of William of Orange's most loyal allies.

Although James II had permitted the Huguenots to settle in England, he had enjoyed an amicable relationship with his fellow Catholic Louis XIV since James realised the importance of the friendship for his own Catholicising measures at home against the suspicions of the Protestant majority. However, the Huguenot presence gave an immense boost to anti-French discourse and joined forces with elements in England that had already been highly suspicious of James. Moreover, conflicts between French and English commercial interests in North America had caused severe friction between both countries since the French had grown antagonistic towards the Hudson's Bay Company and the New England colonies, but the English looked upon French pretensions in New France as encroaching upon their own possessions. The rivalry had spread to the other side of the world, where English and French East India Companies had already embarked upon hostilities.

Many in Germany reacted negatively to the persecution of the Huguenots, which disabused the Protestant princes of the idea that Louis XIV was their ally against the intolerant practices of the Catholic Habsburgs. The Elector of Brandenburg answered the revocation of the Edict of Nantes by promulgating the Edict of Potsdam, which invited the fleeing Huguenots to Brandenburg. However, there were motivations other than religious adherence that disabused him and other German princes of his allegiance to France. Louis XIV had pretensions in the Palatinate in the name of his sister-in-law, Elizabeth Charlotte, and threatened further annexations of the Rhineland. Thus, Frederick-William, spurning his French subsidies, ended his alliance with France and reached agreements with William of Orange, the Emperor and King Charles XI of Sweden, the last of which by temporarily putting aside their differences over Pomerania.

The flight of the Huguenots in southern France caused outright war in the Alpine districts of Piedmont in the Duchy of Savoy, a northern Italian state that was nominally part of the Empire. From their fort at Pinerolo, the French were able to exert considerable pressure on the Duke of Savoy and to force him to persecute his own Protestant community, the Vaudois (Valdesi). The constant threat of interference and intrusion into his domestic affairs was a source of concern for Victor Amadeus, and in 1687, the Duke's policy started to become increasingly anti-French as he searched for a chance to assert his aspirations and concerns. Criticism of Louis XIV's regime spread all over Europe. The Truce of Ratisbon, followed by the revocation of the Edict of Nantes, caused suspicion as to Louis's true intentions. Many also feared the King's supposed designs on universal monarchy, the uniting of the Spanish and the German crowns with that of France. In response, representatives from the Emperor, the southern German princes, Spain (motivated by the French attack in 1683 and the imposed truce of 1684) and Sweden (in its capacity as princes in the Empire) met in Augsburg to form a defensive league of the Rhine in July 1686. Pope Innocent XI, partly because of his anger at Louis's failure to go on crusade against the Turks, gave his secret support.

== Prelude: 1687–1688 ==
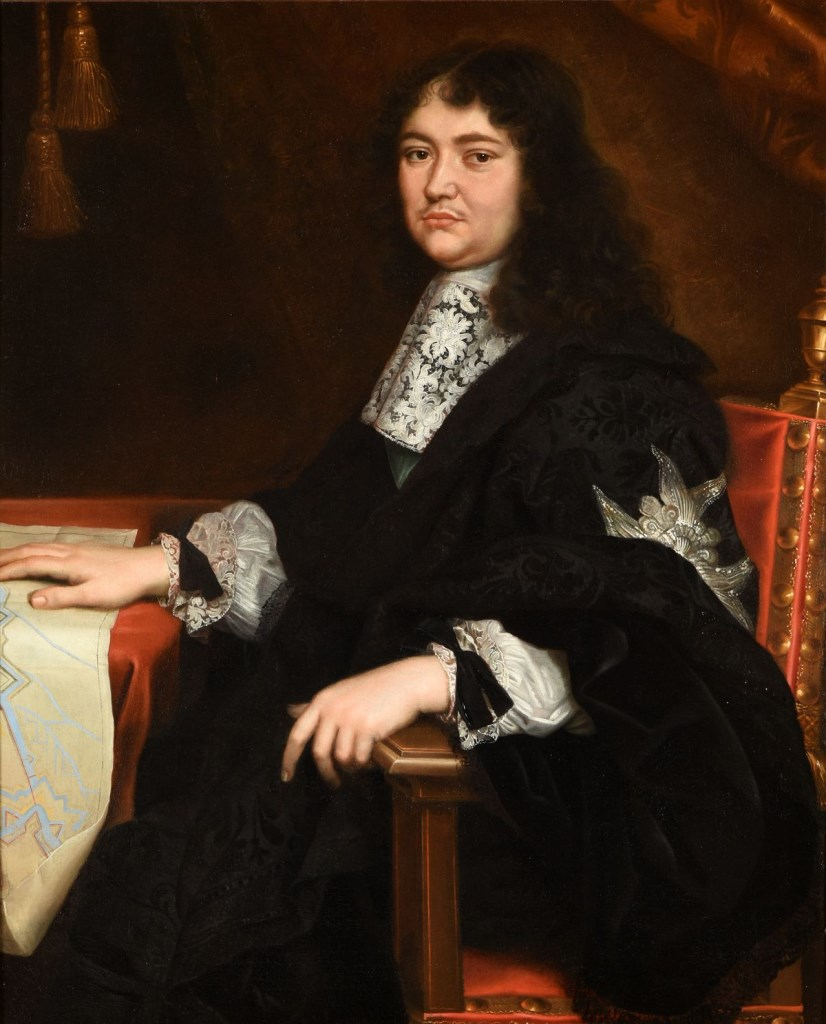
Louvois (1641–1691), Louis XIV's belligerent secretary of state at the height of his powers, by Pierre Mignard.

The League of Augsburg had little military power – the Empire and its Allies in the form of the Holy League were still busy fighting the Ottoman Turks in Hungary. Many of the petty princes were reluctant to act due to the fear of French retaliation. Nevertheless, Louis XIV watched with apprehension Leopold I's advances against the Ottomans. Habsburg victories along the Danube at Buda in September 1686, and Mohács a year later had convinced the French that the Emperor, in alliance with Spain and William of Orange, would soon turn his attention towards France and retake what had recently been won by Louis's military intimidation. In response, Louis XIV sought to guarantee his territorial gains of the Reunions by forcing his German neighbours into converting the Truce of Ratisbon into a permanent settlement. However, a French ultimatum issued in 1687 failed to gain the desired assurances from the Emperor whose victories in the east made the Germans less anxious to compromise in the west.

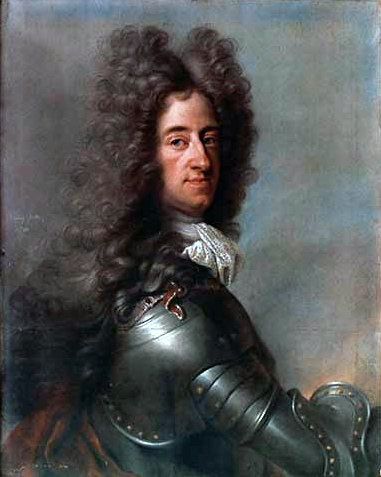
Max Emanuel (1662–1726) by Joseph Vivien.

Another testing point concerned the pro-French Archbishop-Elector, Maximilian Henry, and the question of his succession in the state of Cologne. The territory of the archbishopric lay along the left bank of the Rhine and included three fortresses of the river-line: Bonn, Rheinberg, and Kaiserswerth, excluding the free-city of Cologne itself. Moreover, the archbishop was also prince-bishop of Liège, the small state astride the strategic highway of the river Meuse. When the Elector died on 3 June 1688, Louis XIV pressed for the pro-French Bishop of Strasbourg, Wilhelm Egon von Fürstenberg, to succeed him. The Emperor, however, favoured Joseph Clement, the brother of Max Emanuel, Elector of Bavaria. With neither candidate able to secure the necessary two-thirds of the vote of the canons of the cathedral chapter, the matter was referred to Rome. There was no prospect of the Pope, already in deep conflict with Louis, favouring the French candidate, and on 26 August he awarded the election to Clement.

On 6 September, Leopold I's forces under the Elector of Bavaria secured Belgrade for the Empire. With the Ottomans appearing close to collapse, Louis XIV's ministers, Louvois and Colbert de Croissy, felt it essential to have a quick resolution along the German frontier before the Emperor turned from the Balkans to lead a comparatively united German Empire against France on the Rhine and reverse the Ratisbon settlement. On 24 September Louis published his manifesto, his Mémoire de raisons, listing his grievances: he demanded that the Truce of Ratisbon be turned into a permanent resolution, and that Fürstenburg be appointed Archbishop-Elector of Cologne. He also proposed to occupy the territories that he believed belonged to his sister-in-law regarding the Palatinate succession. The Emperor and the German princes, the Pope, and William of Orange were quite unwilling to grant these demands. For the Dutch in particular, Louis's control of Cologne and Liège would be strategically unacceptable, for with these territories in French hands the Spanish Netherlands 'buffer-zone' would be effectively bypassed. The day after Louis issued his manifesto – well before his enemies could have known its details – the main French army crossed the Rhine as a prelude to investing Philippsburg, the key post between Luxembourg (annexed in 1684) and Strasbourg (seized in 1681), and other Rhineland towns. This pre-emptive strike was intended to intimidate the German states into accepting his conditions, while encouraging the Ottoman Turks to continue their own struggle with the Emperor in the east.

Louis XIV and his ministers had hoped for a quick resolution similar to that secured from the War of the Reunions, but by 1688 the situation was drastically different. In the east, an Imperial army, now manned with veteran officers and men, had dispelled the Turkish threat and crushed Imre Thököly's revolt in Hungary; while in the west and north, William of Orange was fast becoming the leader of a coalition of Protestant states, anxious to join with the Emperor and Spain, and end the hegemony of France. Louis wanted a short defensive war, yet by crossing the Rhine that summer he began a long war of attrition; a war framed by interests of the state, its defensible frontiers, and the balance of power in Europe.

== Nine years of war: 1688–1697 ==
=== Rhineland and the Empire ===
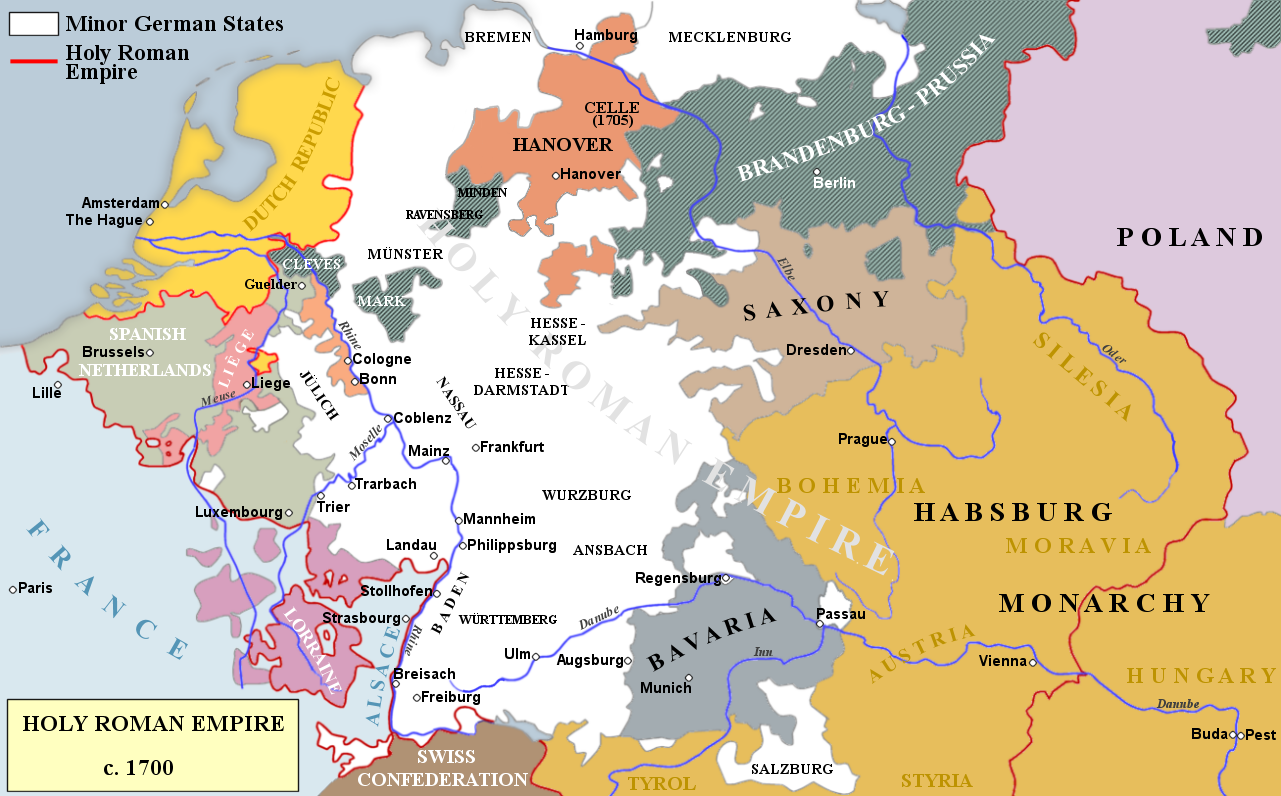
Rhine campaign 1688–89. French forces cross the Rhine at Strasbourg and proceed to invest Philippsburg – the key to the middle Rhine – on 27 September 1688.

Marshal Duras, Vauban, and 30,000 men – all under the nominal command of the Dauphin – besieged the Elector of Trier's fortress of Philippsburg on 27 September 1688. After a vigorous defence it fell on 30 October. Louis XIV's army proceeded to take Mannheim, which capitulated on 11 November, shortly followed by Frankenthal. Other towns fell without resistance, including Oppenheim, Worms, Bingen, Kaiserslautern, Heidelberg, Speyer and, above all, the key fortress of Mainz. After Coblenz failed to surrender Boufflers put it under heavy bombardment, but it did not fall to the French.

Louis XIV now mastered the Rhine south of Mainz to the Swiss border, but although the attacks kept the Turks fighting in the east, the impact on Leopold I and the German states had the opposite effect of what had been intended. The League of Augsburg was not strong enough to meet the threat, but on 22 October 1688 the powerful German princes, including the Elector of Brandenburg, John George III, Elector of Saxony, Ernest Augustus of Hanover, and Charles I, Landgrave of Hesse-Kassel, reached an agreement in Magdeburg that mobilised the forces of north Germany. Meanwhile, the Emperor recalled the Bavarian, Swabian, and Franconian troops under the Elector of Bavaria from the Ottoman front to defend south Germany. The French had not prepared for such an eventuality. Realising that the war in Germany was not going to end quickly and that the Rhineland blitz would not be a brief and decisive parade of French glory, Louis XIV and Louvois resolved upon a scorched earth policy in the Palatinate, Baden and Württemberg, intent on denying enemy troops local resources and prevent them from invading French territory. By 20 December, Louvois had selected all the cities, towns, villages and châteaux intended for destruction. On 2 March 1689, Count of Tessé torched Heidelberg; on 8 March Montclar levelled Mannheim. Oppenheim and Worms were finally destroyed on 31 May, followed by Speyer on 1 June, and Bingen on 4 June. In all, French troops burnt over 20 substantial towns as well as numerous villages and remaining medieval castles.

The Imperial Diet of the Holy Roman Empire declared war on France on 11 February 1689, beginning a unified imperial war effort. The Germans prepared to take back what they had lost, and in 1689 formed three armies along the Rhine. The smallest of these, initially under the Elector of Bavaria, protected the upper Rhine between the lines north of Strasbourg to the Black Forest. On the middle Rhine stood the largest army under the best Imperial general, and commander-in-chief, Charles V, Duke of Lorraine. Charles V cleared away the French threat on Frankfurt and opened trenches around Mainz on 22/23 July. After a bloody two months siege, the Marquis of Huxelles finally yielded the town on 8 September. Meanwhile, on the lower Rhine stood the Elector of Brandenburg who, aided by the celebrated Dutch engineer Menno van Coehoorn, besieged Kaiserswerth. Kaiserswerth fell on 26 June before the Elector led his army on Bonn, which, having endured a heavy bombardment, finally capitulated on 10 October. The invasion of the Rhineland had united the German princes in their opposition to Louis XIV who had lost more than he had gained that year along the Rhine. The campaign had also created a diversion of French forces and sufficient time for William of Orange to invade England.

=== Britain ===
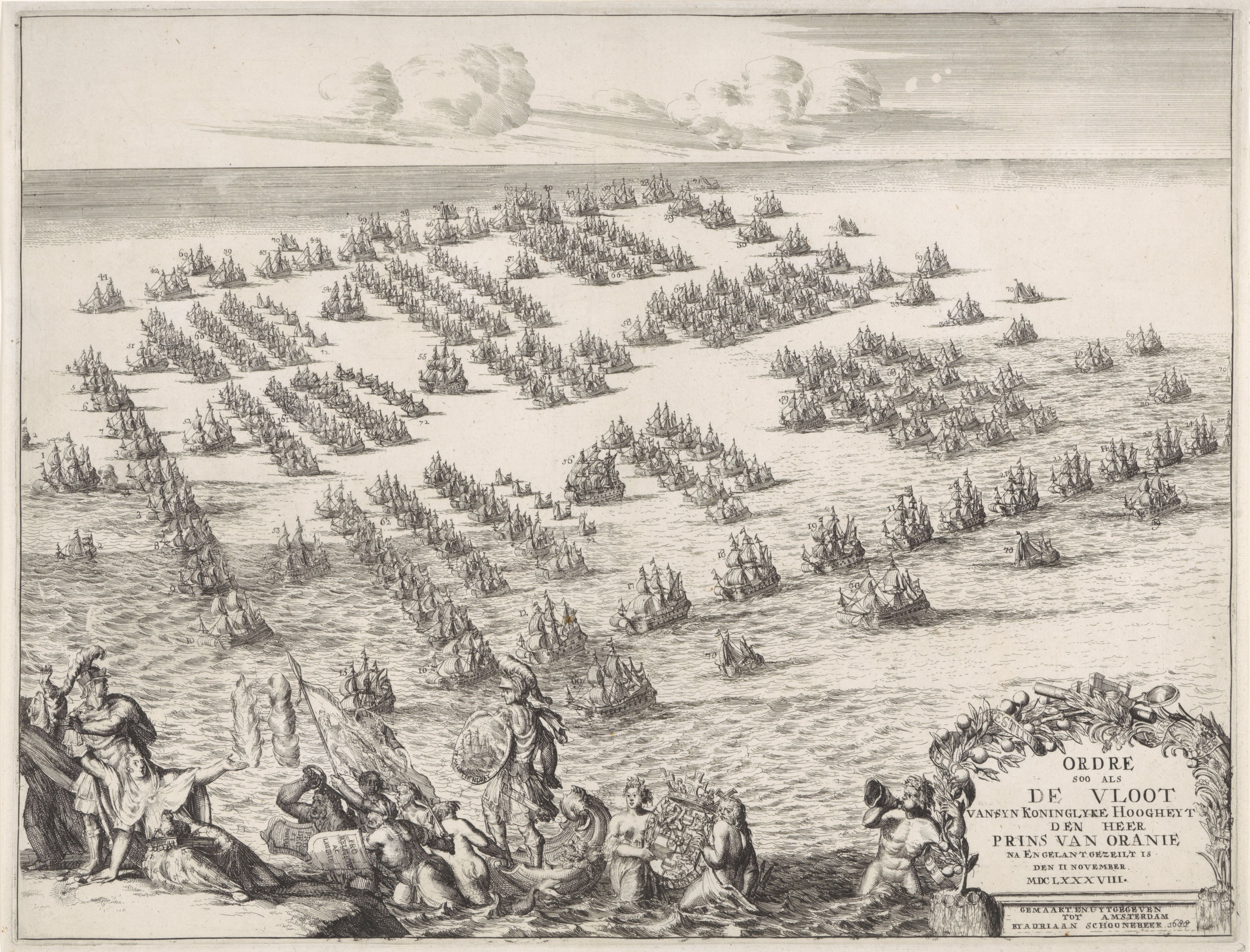
The formation of the Dutch fleet that sailed for England. With more than 450 ships, it was about three times the size of the Spanish Armada of 1588.

James II's ill-advised attempts to Catholicise the army, government and other institutions had proved increasingly unpopular with his mainly Protestant subjects. His open Catholicism and his dealings with Catholic France had also strained relations between England and the Dutch Republic, but because his daughter Mary was the Protestant heir to the English throne, her husband William of Orange had been reluctant to act against James II for fear it would ruin her succession prospects. Yet if England was left to itself the situation could become desperate for the Dutch Republic: Louis XIV might intervene and so make James II his vassal; or James, wishing to distract his subjects, might even join with Louis in a repetition of the attack made on the Dutch Republic in 1672. By the end of 1687, therefore, William had envisaged intervention, and by early 1688 he had secretly begun to make active preparations. The birth of a son to James's second wife in June displaced William's wife Mary as James's heir apparent. With the French busy creating their cordon sanitaire in the Palatinate (too busy to consider serious intervention in the Spanish Netherlands or to move against the south-eastern Dutch provinces along the Rhine) the States General unanimously gave William their full support in the knowledge that the overthrow of James II was in the security interests of their own state.

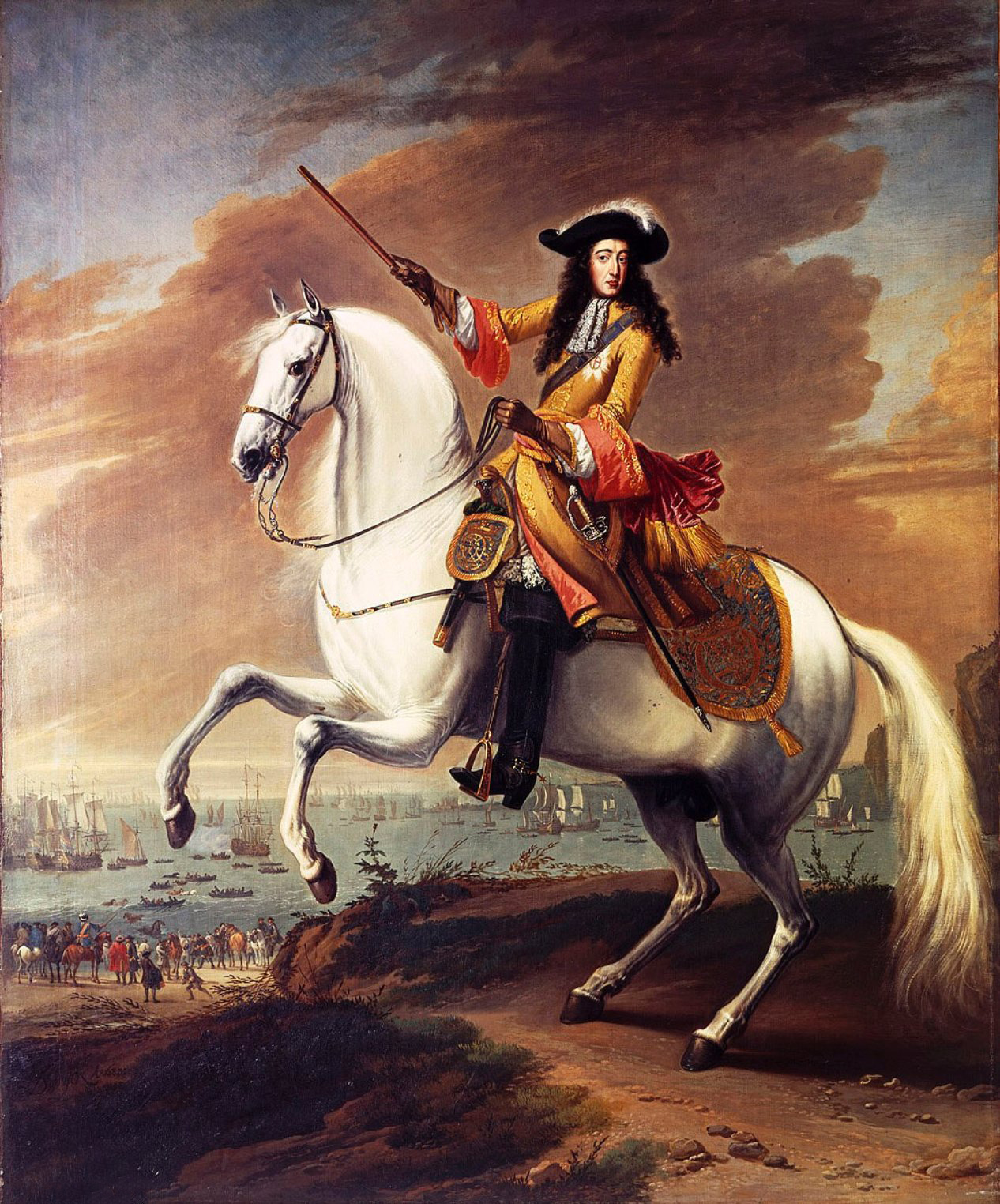
William of Orange Landing at Brixham, Torbay, 5 November 1688

The invasion fleet consisted of 463 ships and 40,000 men on board, roughly twice the size of the Spanish Armada, with 49 warships, 76 transports carrying soldiers and 120 for the five thousand horses required by the cavalry and supply train. (Note: There were seventy-five vessels of the Dutch States Navy. Forty-nine were warships of more than twenty cannon. Eight of these could count as third rates of 60–68 cannon. Additionally there were nine frigates, twenty-eight galliots and nine fireships. Transports included seventy-six fluyts to carry the soldiers, 120 small transports to carry five thousand horses and about seventy supply vessels. Also, sixty fishing vessels served as landing craft. Most of the warships had been provided by the Admiralty of Amsterdam.) For propaganda purposes, English admiral Arthur Herbert was nominally put in command, but in reality operational control remained with Lieutenant-Admiral Cornelis Evertsen the Youngest and Vice-Admiral Philips van Almonde. Louis XIV had considered William's invasion as a declaration of war between France and the Dutch Republic (officially declared on 26 November); but he did little to stop the invasion – his main concern was the Rhineland. Moreover, French diplomats had calculated that William's action would plunge England into a protracted civil war that would either absorb Dutch resources or draw England closer to France. However, after his forces landed unhindered at Torbay on 5 November (O.S), many welcomed William with open arms, and the subsequent Glorious Revolution brought a rapid end to James II's reign. On 13 February 1689 (O.S.) William of Orange became King William III of England – reigning jointly with his wife Mary – and bound together the fortunes of England and the Dutch Republic. Yet few people in England suspected that William had sought the crown for himself or that his aim was to bring England into the war against France on the Dutch side. The Convention Parliament did not see that the offer of joint monarchy carried with it the corollary of a declaration of war, but the subsequent actions of the deposed king finally swung Parliament behind William's war policy.

British historian J. R. Jones states that King William was given

supreme command within the alliance throughout the Nine Years' War. His experience and knowledge of European affairs made him the indispensable director of Allied diplomatic and military strategy, and he derived additional authority from his enhanced status as king of England – even the Emperor Leopold ... recognized his leadership. William's English subjects played subordinate or even minor roles in diplomatic and military affairs, having a major share only in the direction of the war at sea. Parliament and the nation had to provide money, men and ships, and William had found it expedient to explain his intentions ... but this did not mean that Parliament or even ministers assisted in the formulation of policy.

Before British forces could effectively take part in the war, the English army had to be reorganised. James' commander-in-chief Louis de Duras, Earl of Feversham, had disbanded the English army in December 1688 so it had to be effectively rebuilt from scratch. Hendrik Trajectinus, Count of Solms and other Dutch officers and officials were appointed by William III in key positions in the English military organisation to reform the English army according to the Dutch model and train the troops in the 'Dutch Exercise', a musketry drill more commonly referred to as platoon fire. To make their dominance over the English army less painful for the British, the Dutch agreed that an Englishman would always be in command of a combined Anglo-Dutch fleet.

=== Ireland and Scotland ===
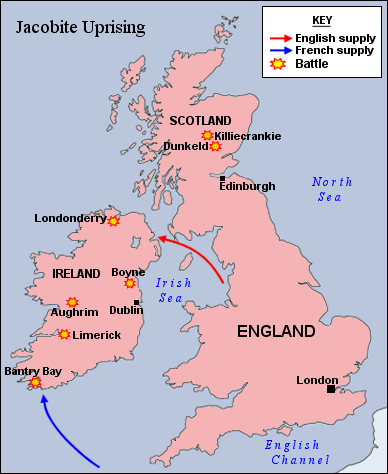
Jacobite risings in Ireland and Scotland 1689–1691

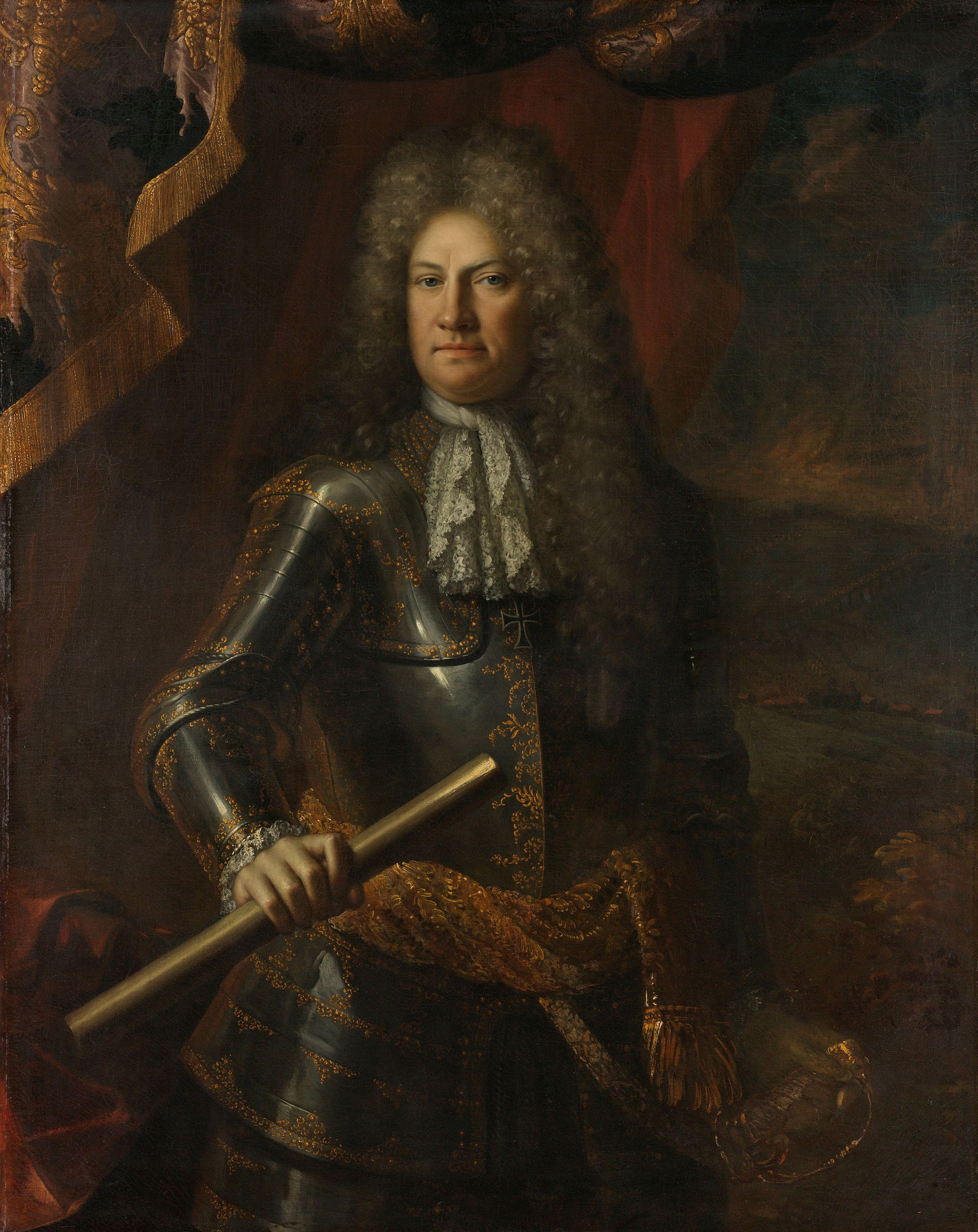
Godert de Ginkel, successfully commanded the Anglo-Dutch forces in Ireland after William III left for England

After his flight from England in December 1688, James II had been given refuge by Louis XIV, who provided him financial and diplomatic assistance. Accompanied by 6,000 French troops, on 12 March 1689 he landed in Ireland, where he was backed by the majority Catholic population. His supporters were known as "Jacobites", and the war in Ireland was accompanied by a rising in Scotland; for James, the main objective was to retake England and thus he viewed both Scotland and Ireland as strategic dead ends. On the other hand, Louis saw them as an opportunity to divert British resources from the Low Countries, a difference in aims that was never adequately resolved.

James' Catholic deputy, the Earl of Tyrconnell, had raised an Army of around 36,000, although many were poorly equipped and it was almost impossible to feed, pay and supply so many. Although they quickly occupied much of Ireland, including largely Protestant Ulster, they were unable to capture the key northern port of Derry and were forced to retreat at the end of July. In August, Williamite general Schomberg landed in Belfast Lough with 15,000 reinforcements, but logistics failures meant his army stalled at Dundalk and suffered heavily from sickness and desertion.

The Scottish Jacobites suffered heavy losses in securing victory at Killiecrankie in July 1689, including their leader Viscount Dundee. By May 1690 the rising had been largely suppressed, although pockets of resistance continued in the Highlands until early 1692. At the same time, William III assumed command of government troops in Ireland and gained an important success at The Battle of the Boyne in July 1690, before victory at Beachy Head gave the French temporary control of the English Channel. This was followed by a French raid on the small English town of Teignouth which combined with the defeat at Beachy Head caused panic in England. James returned to France to urge an immediate invasion of England, but the Anglo-Dutch fleet soon regained maritime supremacy, and the opportunity was lost.

By the end of 1690, French and Jacobite troops were confined to the south and west of Ireland. Although repulsed with heavy losses at Limerick in September, William transferred command to Godert de Ginkel and returned to Flanders. Despite receiving reinforcements and a new general in the Marquis de St Ruth, the Franco-Irish army was defeated at Aughrim on 12 July 1691; the war in Ireland ended with the Treaty of Limerick in October, allowing the bulk of the Williamite forces to be shipped to the Low Countries.

=== War aims and the Grand Alliance ===
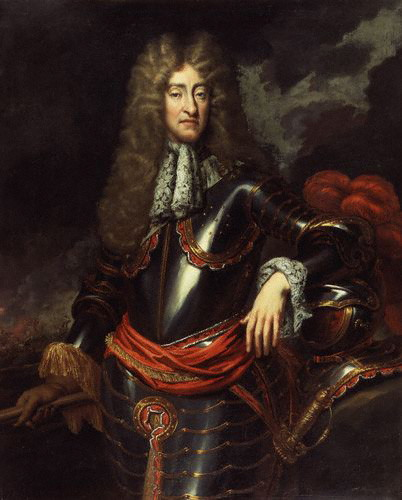
James II (1633–1701) c. 1690, artist unknown

The success of William's invasion of England rapidly led to the coalition he had long desired. On 12 May 1689 the Dutch and the Holy Roman Emperor had signed an offensive compact in Vienna, the aims of which were no less than to force France back to her borders as they were at the end of the Franco-Spanish War (1659), thus depriving Louis XIV of all his gains since his personal rule began. This meant for the Emperor and the German princes the reconquest of Lorraine, Strasbourg, parts of Alsace, and some Rhineland fortresses. Leopold I had tried to disentangle himself from the Turkish war to concentrate on the coming struggle, but the French invasion of the Rhineland had encouraged the Turks to stiffen their terms for peace and make demands the Emperor could not conceivably accept. Leopold I's decision to side with the coalition (against the opposition of many of his advisers) was, therefore, a decision to intervene in the west while continuing to fight the Ottomans in the Balkans. Although the Emperor's immediate concerns were for the Rhineland, the most important parts of the treaty were the secret articles pledging England and the States-General to assist him in securing the Spanish succession should Charles II die without an heir, and to use their influence to secure his son's election to succeed him as Emperor.

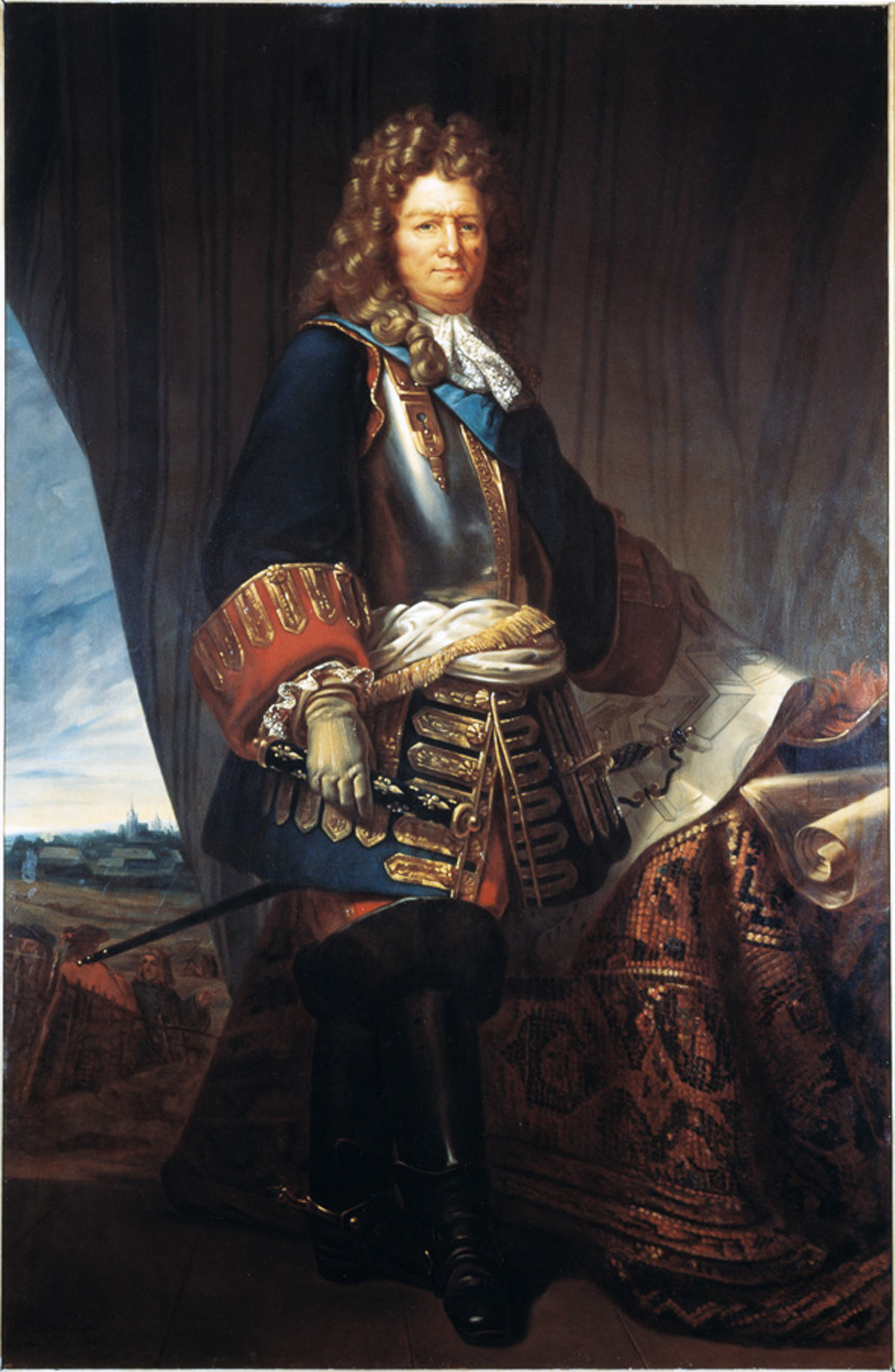
Marshal Vauban (1633–1707), Louis XIV's greatest military engineer and one of his most trusted advisers

William III regarded the war as an opportunity to reduce the power of France and protect the Dutch Republic, while providing conditions that would encourage trade and commerce. Although there remained territorial anomalies, Dutch war aims did not involve substantial alterations to the frontier; but William did aim to secure his new position in Britain. By seeking refuge in France and subsequently invading Ireland, James II had given William III the ideal instrument to convince the English parliament that entry into a major European war was unavoidable. With the support of Parliament, William III and Mary II declared war on 17 May (O.S.); they then passed the Trade with France Act 1688 (1 Will. & Mar. c. 34), which prohibited all English trade and commerce with France, effective 24 August. This Anglo-Dutch alignment was the basis for the Grand Alliance, ratified on 20 December by William III representing England, Anthonie Heinsius and Treasurer Jacob Hop representing the Dutch Republic, and Königsegg and Stratman representing Emperor Leopold I. Like the Dutch the English were not preoccupied with territorial gains on the Continent, but were deeply concerned with limiting the power of France to defend against a Jacobite restoration (Louis XIV threatened to overthrow the Glorious Revolution and the precarious political settlement by supporting the old king over the new one). William III had secured his goal of mobilising Britain's resources for the anti-French coalition, but the Jacobite threat in Scotland and Ireland meant only a small English expeditionary force could be committed to assist the Dutch States Army in the coalition in the Spanish Netherlands for the first three years of the war.

The Duke of Lorraine also joined the Alliance at the same time as England, while the King of Spain (who had been at war with France since April) and the Duke of Savoy signed in June 1690. The Allies had offered Victor Amadeus handsome terms to join the Grand Alliance, including the return of Casale to Mantua (he hoped it would revert to him upon the death of the childless Duke of Mantua) and of Pinerolo to himself. His adhesion to the Allied cause would facilitate the invasion of France through Dauphiné and Provence, where the naval base of Toulon lay. In contrast Louis XIV had embarked on a policy of overt military intimidation to retain Savoy in the French orbit, and had envisaged the military occupation of parts of Piedmont (including the citadel of Turin) to guarantee communications between Pinerolo and Casale. French demands on Victor Amadeus, and their determination to prevent the Duke from achieving his dynastic aims, (Note: The Duke of Savoy's dynastic pretensions included a serious claim on the Spanish succession that provided an alternative to the rival claims of the Grand Dauphin and the Austrian Habsburgs.) were nothing less than an attack on Savoyard independence, convincing the Duke that he had to stand up to French aggression.

The Elector of Bavaria consented to add his name to the Grand Alliance on 4 May 1690, while the Elector of Brandenburg joined the anti-French coalition on 6 September. However, few of the minor powers were as devoted to the common cause, and all protected their own interests; some never hesitated to exact a high price for continuing their support. Charles XI of Sweden supplied the contingents due from his German possessions to the Allied cause (6,000 men and 12 warships), while in August Christian V of Denmark agreed to a treaty to supply William III with 7,000 troops in return for a subsidy. However, in March 1691 Sweden and Denmark put aside their mutual distrust and made a treaty of armed neutrality for the protection of their commerce and to prevent the war spreading north. To the annoyance of the Maritime Powers the Swedes now saw their role outside the great power-struggle of the Nine Years' War, exploiting opportunities to increase their own maritime trade. Nevertheless, Louis XIV at last faced a powerful coalition aimed at forcing France to recognise Europe's rights and interests.

=== Expanding war: 1690–1691 ===
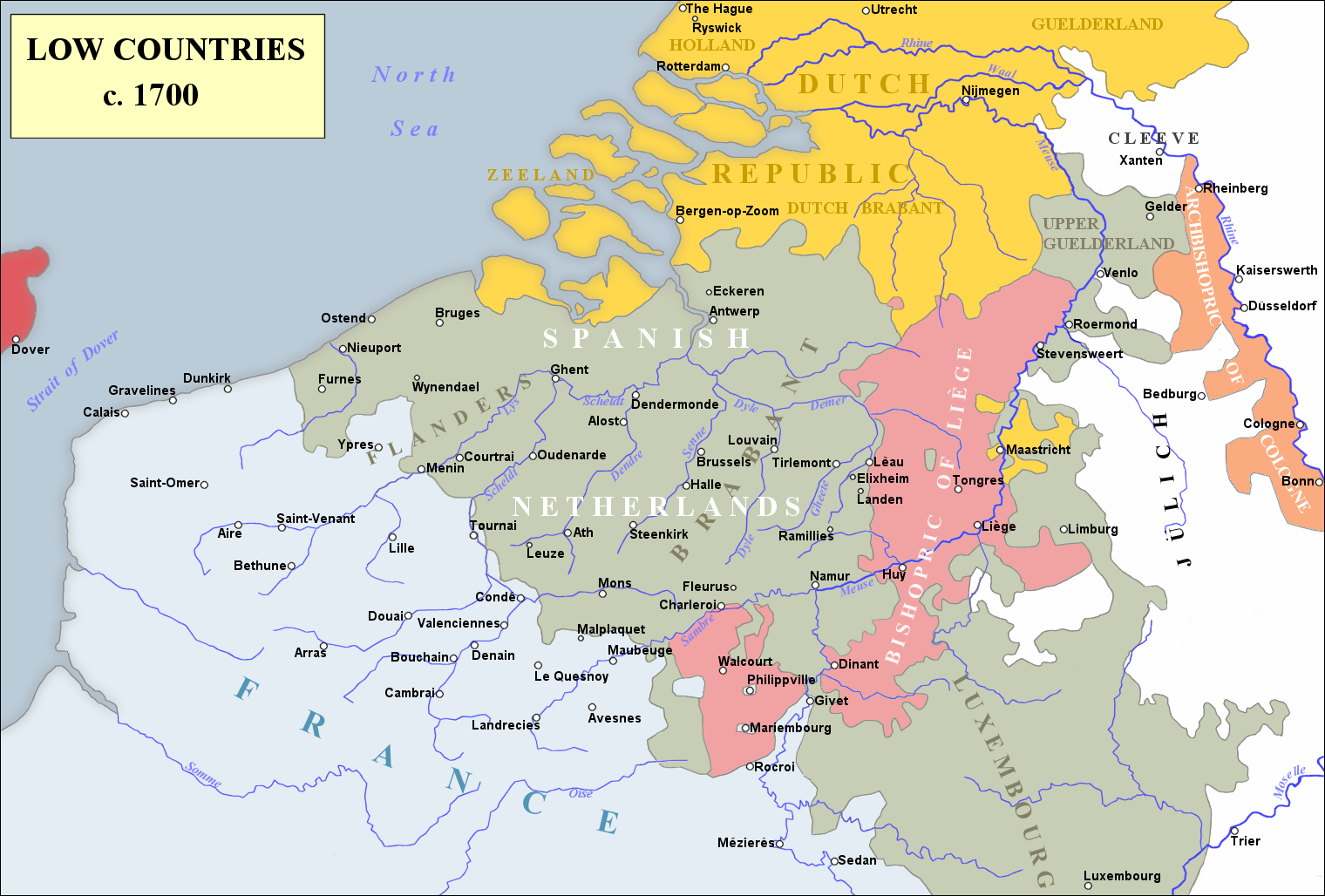
The Low Countries c. 1700: the principal theatre during the Nine Years' War

The main fighting of the Nine Years' War took place around France's borders: in the Spanish Netherlands; the Rhineland; Catalonia; and Piedmont-Savoy. The importance of the Spanish Netherlands was the result of its geographic position, sandwiched between France and the Dutch Republic. Initially Marshal Humières commanded French forces in this theatre but in 1689, while the French concentrated on the Rhine, it produced little more than a stand-off – the most significant engagement occurred when William's second-in-command, the Prince of Waldeck, defeated Humières at the Battle of Walcourt on 25 August. However, by 1690 the Spanish Netherlands had become the main seat of the war where the French formed two armies: Boufflers' army on the Moselle, and a larger force to the west under Humières' successor – and Louis XIV's greatest general of the period – Marshal Luxembourg. On 1 July Luxembourg secured a clear tactical victory over Waldeck at the Battle of Fleurus; but his success produced little benefit – Louis XIV's concerns for the dauphin on the Rhine (where Marshal de Lorge now held actual command) overrode strategic necessity in the other theatres and forestalled a plan to besiege Namur or Charleroi. For the Emperor and the German princes, though, the most serious fact of 1690 was that the Turks had been victorious on the Danube, requiring them to send reinforcements to the east. The Elector of Bavaria – now Imperial commander-in-chief following Lorraine's death in April – could offer nothing on the lower or upper Rhine, and the campaign failed to produce a single major battle or siege.

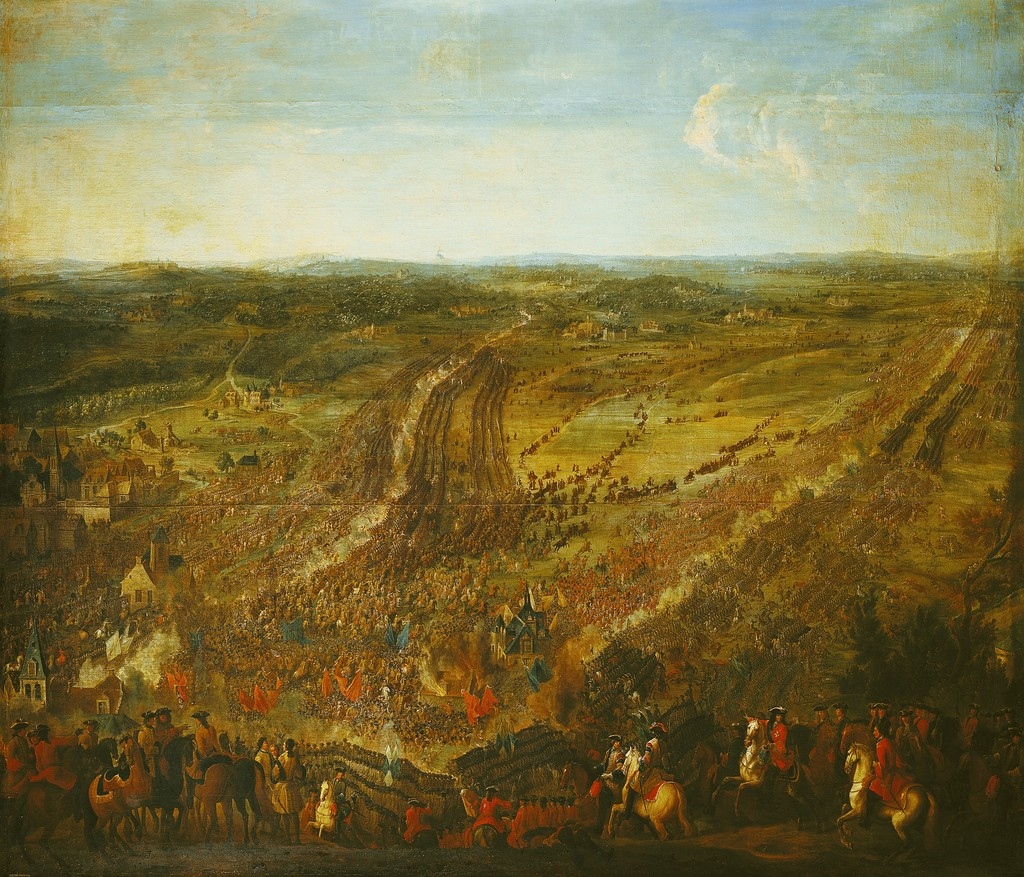
Battle of Fleurus, 1690

The smallest front of the war was in Catalonia. In 1689 the Duke of Noailles had led French forces there aimed at bringing further pressure to bear on the Spanish by re-igniting a peasant rising against Charles II, which initially broke out in 1687. Exploiting the situation, Noailles captured Camprodon on 22 May, but a larger Spanish army under the Duke of Villahermosa forced him to withdraw back to Roussillon in August. The Catalan campaign settled down in 1690, but a new front in Piedmont-Savoy proved more eventful. A ferment of religious animosities and Savoyard hatred of the French produced a theatre characterised by massacres and atrocities: constant guerrilla attacks by the armed populace were met by draconian reprisals. In 1690 Saint-Ruth took most of the Victor Amadeus II's exposed Duchy of Savoy, routing the Savoyard army in the process until only the great fortress of Montmélian remained in ducal hands; while to the south in Piedmont, Nicolas Catinat led 12,000 men and soundly defeated Victor Amadeus at the Battle of Staffarda on 18 August. Catinat immediately took Saluzzo, followed by Savigliano, Fossano, and Susa, but lacking sufficient troops, and with sickness rife within his army, Catinat was obliged to withdraw back across the Alps for the winter.

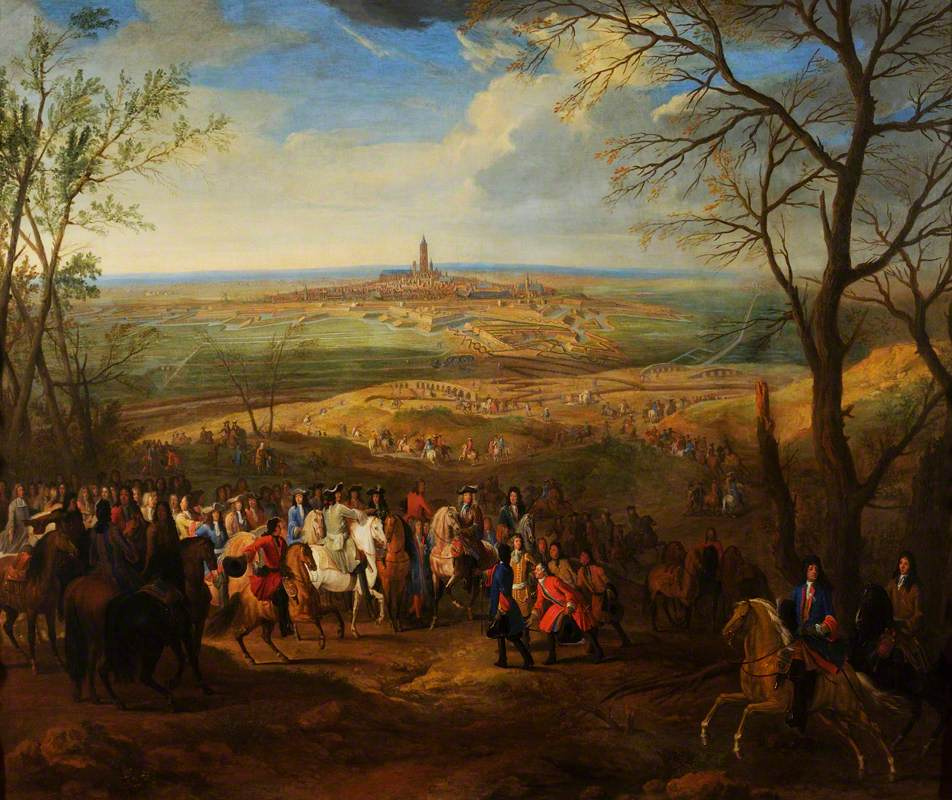
Siege of Mons 1691. While he never commanded a battle in the open field, Louis XIV attended many sieges (at a safe distance) until advancing age limited his activities.

French successes in 1690 had checked the Allies on most of the mainland fronts, yet their victories had not broken the Grand Alliance. With the hope of unhinging the coalition French commanders in 1691 prepared for an early double-blow: the capture of Mons in the Spanish Netherlands, and Nice in northern Italy. Boufflers invested Mons on 15 March with some 46,000 men, while Luxembourg commanded a similar force of observation. After some of the most intense fighting of all of Louis XIV's wars the town inevitably capitulated on 8 April. Luxembourg proceeded to take Halle at the end of May, while Boufflers bombarded Liège; but these acts proved to have no political nor strategic consequence. The final action of note in the Low Countries came on 19 September when Luxembourg's cavalry surprised and defeated the rear of the Allied forces in a minor action near Leuze. Now that the defence of the Spanish Netherlands depended almost wholly on the Allies William III insisted on replacing its Spanish governor, the Marquis of Gastañaga, with the Elector of Bavaria, thus overcoming delays in getting decisions from Madrid.

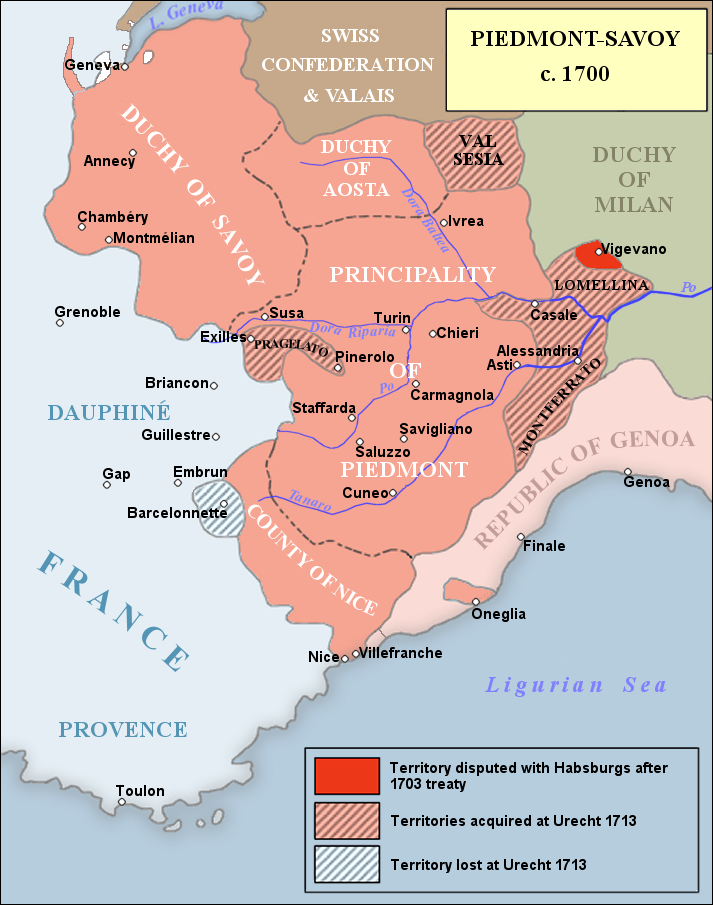
North Italian campaign 1690–1696. The territories of Victor Amadeus II, the Duke of Savoy, comprised the County of Nice, Duchy of Savoy and the Principality of Piedmont, which contained the capital city, Turin.

In 1691 there was little significant fighting in the Catalan and Rhineland fronts. In contrast, the northern Italian theatre was very active. Villefranche fell to French forces on 20 March, followed by Nice on 1 April, forestalling any chance of an Allied invasion of France along the coast. Meanwhile, to the north, in the Duchy of Savoy, the Marquis of La Hoguette took Montmélian (the region's last remaining stronghold) on 22 December – a major loss for the Grand Alliance. However, by comparison the French campaign on the Piedmontese plain was far from successful. Although Carmagnola fell in June, the Marquis of Feuquières, on learning of the approach of Prince Eugene of Savoy's relief force, precipitously abandoned the Siege of Cuneo with the loss of some 800 men and all his heavy guns. With Louis XIV concentrating his resources in Alsace and the Low Countries, Catinat was forced onto the defensive. The initiative in northern Italy now passed to the Allies who, as early as August, had 45,000 men (on paper) in the region, enabling them to regain Carmagnola in October. Louis XIV offered peace terms in December, but anticipating military superiority for the following campaign Amadeus was not prepared to negotiate seriously.

=== Heavy fighting: 1692–1693 ===
After the sudden death of the influential Louvois in July 1691 Louis XIV had assumed a more active role in the direction of military policy, relying on advice from experts such as the Marquis of Chamlay and Vauban. Louvois' death also brought changes to state policy with the less adventurous Duc de Beauvilliers and the Marquis de Pomponne entering Louis' government as ministers of state. From 1691 onwards the king and Pomponne pursued efforts to unglue the Grand Alliance, including secret talks with Emperor Leopold I and, from August, attempts of religious solidarity with Catholic Spain. The approaches made to Spain came to naught (the Nine Years' War was not a religious war), but the Maritime Powers were also keen for peace. Talks were hampered, however, by Louis' reluctance to cede his earlier gains (at least those made in the Reunions) and, in his deference to the principle of the divine right of kings, his unwillingness to recognise William III's claim to the English throne. For his part William was intensely suspicious of the Sun King and his supposed designs for universal monarchy.

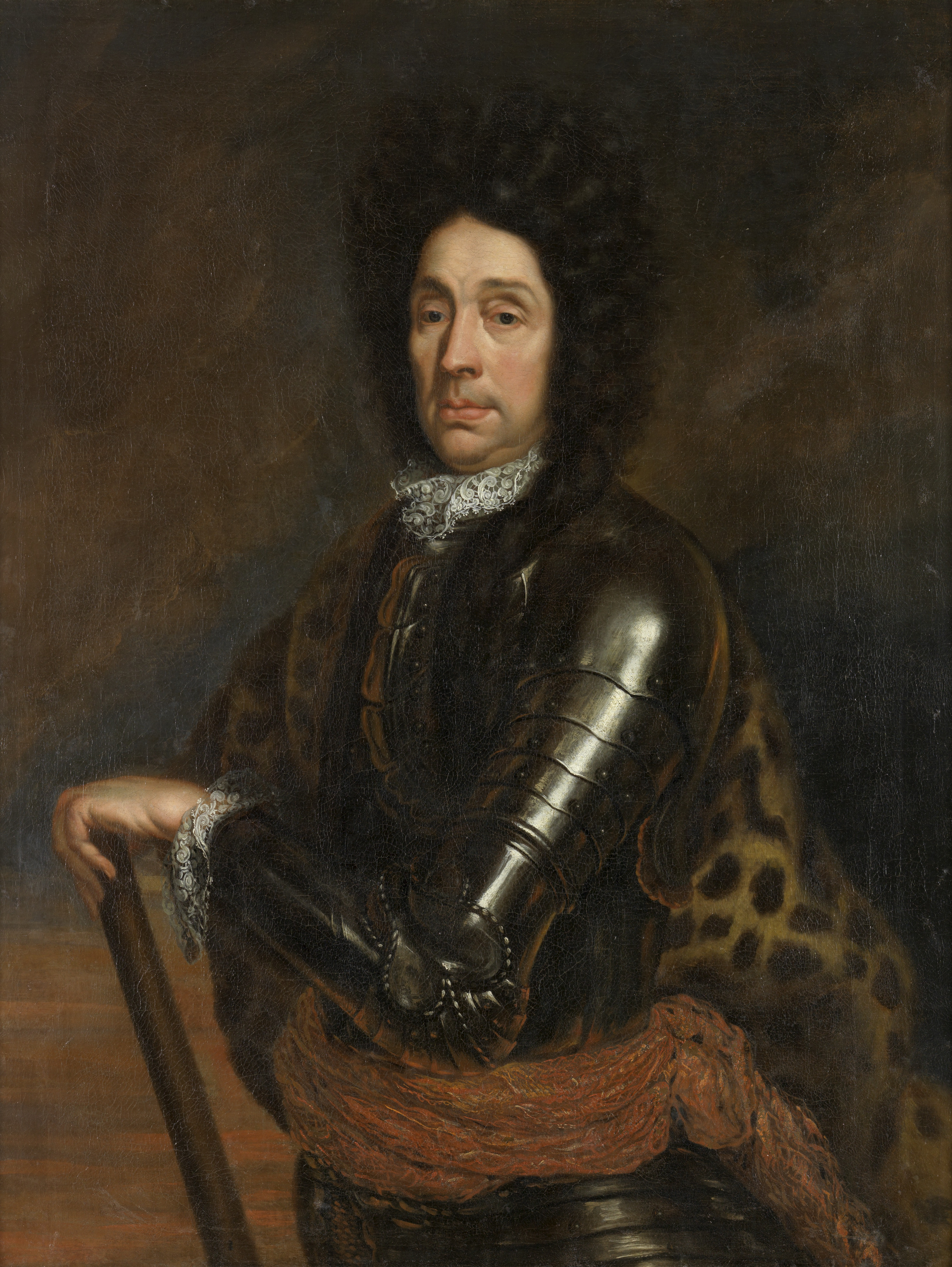
Menno van Coehoorn. Dutch military engineer and rival of Vauban

Over the winter of 1691/92 the French devised a grand plan to gain the ascendancy over their enemies – a design for the invasion of England in one more effort to support James II in his attempts to regain his kingdoms; and a simultaneous assault on Namur in the Spanish Netherlands. The French hoped that Namur's seizure might inspire the Dutch to make peace, but if not, its capture would nevertheless be an important pawn at any future negotiations. With 60,000 men (protected by a similar force of observation under Luxembourg), Marshal Vauban invested the stronghold on 29 May. The town soon fell but the citadel – defended by van Coehoorn – held out until 30 June. Endeavouring to restore the situation in the Spanish Netherlands William III surprised Luxembourg's army near the village of Steenkirk on 3 August. The Allies enjoyed some initial success, but as French reinforcements came up William III's advance stalled. The Allies retired from the field in good order, and both sides claimed victory: the French because they repulsed the assault; the Allies because they had saved Liège from the same fate as Namur. However, due to the nature of late 17th-century warfare the battle, like Fleurus before it, produced little of consequence. (See below).

Battle of La Hogue, (1692) by Adriaen van Diest. The last act of the battle – French ships set on fire at La Hogue.

While French arms had proved successful at Namur the proposed descent on England was a failure. James II believed that there would be considerable support for his cause once he had established himself on English soil, but a series of delays and conflicting orders ensured a very uneven naval contest in the English Channel. The engagement was fought at the tip of the Cherbourg peninsula, and lasted six days. At the action off Cape Barfleur on 29 May, the French fleet of 44 rated vessels under Admiral Tourville put up stern resistance against Admirals Russell's, Rooke's and Almonde's 82 rated English and Dutch vessels. Nevertheless, the French were forced to disengage: some escaped, but the 15 ships that had sought safety in Cherbourg and La Hogue were destroyed by English seamen and fireships on 2–3 June. With the Allies now dominant in the English Channel James II's invasion was abandoned. Yet the battle itself was not the death-blow for the French navy: the subsequent mismanagement and underfunding of the fleet under Pontchartrain, coupled with Louis' own personal lack of interest, were central to France's loss of naval superiority over the English and Dutch during the Nine Years' War.

Meanwhile, in southern Europe the Duke of Savoy with 29,000 men (substantially exceeding Catinat's number who had sent some troops to the Netherlands) invaded Dauphiné via the mountain trails shown to them by the Vaudois. The Allies invested Embrun, which capitulated on 15 August, before sacking the deserted town of Gap. However, with their commander falling ill with smallpox, and concluding that holding Embrun was untenable, the Allies abandoned Dauphiné in mid-September, leaving behind seventy villages and châteaux burned and pillaged. The attack on Dauphiné had required Noailles give up troops to bolster Catinat, condemning him to a passive campaign in Catalonia; but on the Rhine the French gained the upper hand. De Lorge devoted much of his effort imposing contributions in Swabia and up to Franconia. In October the French commander relieved the siege of Ebernburg on the left bank of the Rhine before returning to winter quarters.

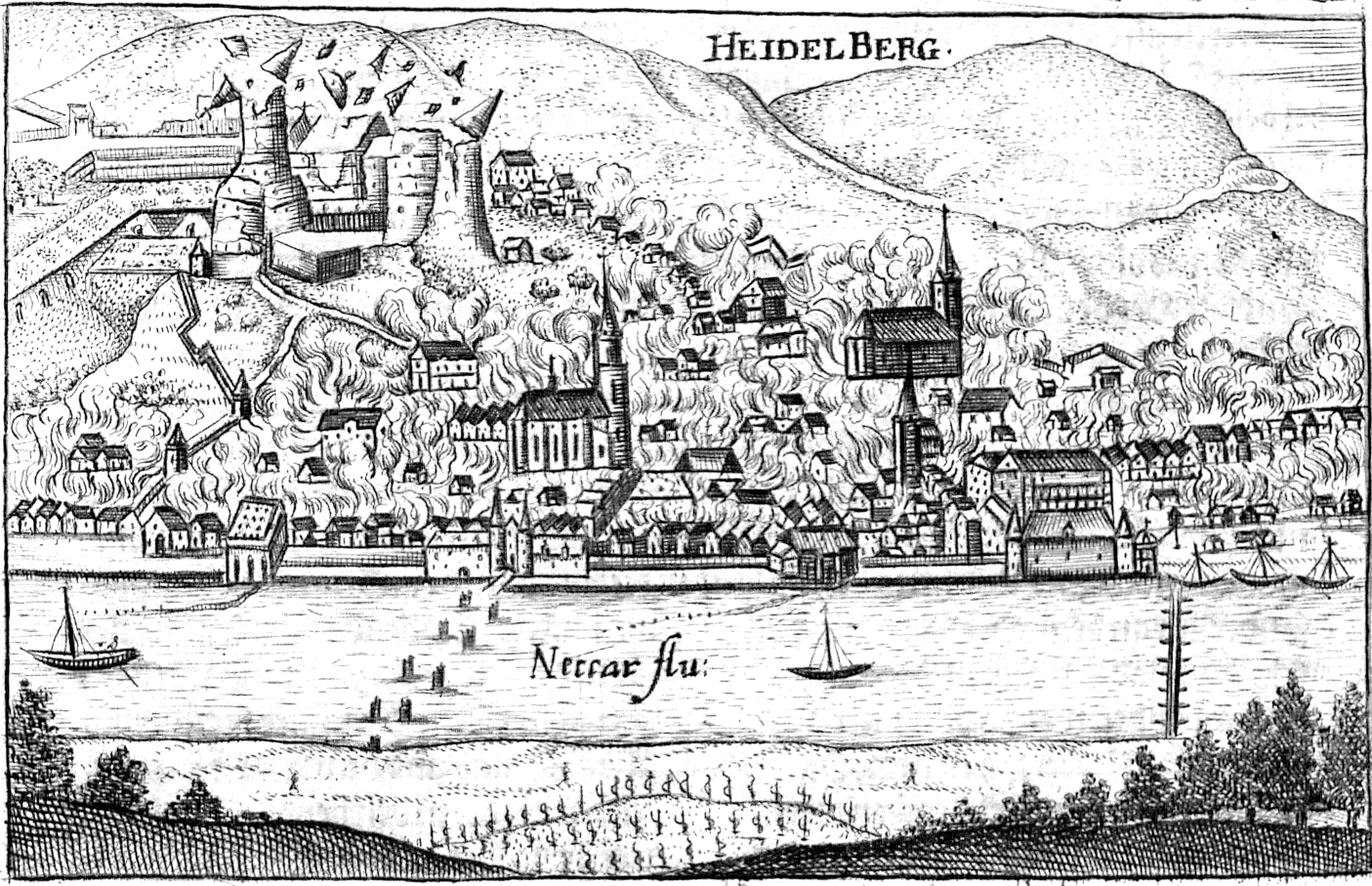
1693 detonation of Heidelberg castle in a contemporary print

By 1693 the French army had reached an official size of over 400,000 men (on paper), but Louis XIV was facing an economic crisis. France and northern Italy witnessed severe harvest failures resulting in widespread famine which, by the end of 1694, had accounted for the deaths of an estimated two million people. Nevertheless, as a prelude to offering generous peace terms before the Grand Alliance Louis XIV planned to go over to the offensive: Luxembourg would campaign in Flanders, Catinat in northern Italy, and in Germany, where Louis XIV had hoped for a war-winning advantage, Marshal de Lorge would attack Heidelberg. In the event, Heidelberg fell on 22 May before Luxembourg's army took to the field in the Netherlands, but the new Imperial commander on the Rhine, Prince Louis of Baden, provided a strong defence and prevented further French gains.

In the Low Countries, the French took Huy and on 23 July, Luxembourg found William's army near the villages of Neerwinden and Landen. The ensuing engagement on 29 July was a close and costly encounter but French forces, whose cavalry once again showed their superiority, prevailed. William was however able to quickly replace his losses, while Luxembourg's infantry was so battered that he had to refrain from besieging Liège, the city that had been the main objective for the French that year. To still make something of the campaign Louis ordered Luxembourg and Vauban to take Charleroi, the last Spanish stronghold on the Sambre, sandwiched between the French fortifications of Mons and Namur. The French captured the town on 10 October which, together with the earlier prizes of Mons, Namur and Huy, provided the French with a new and impressive forward line of defence.

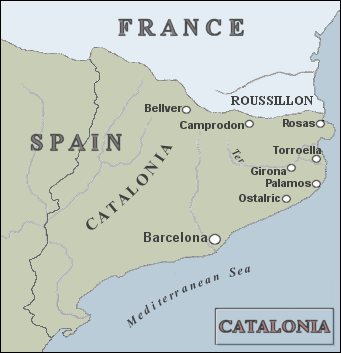
Catalan campaign 1689–1697. The Catalan front was the smallest of the Nine Years' War.

In northern Italy, meanwhile, Catinat marched on Rivoli (with reinforcements from the Rhine and Catalan fronts), forcing the Duke of Savoy to abandon the siege and bombardment of Pinerolo (25 September – 1 October) before withdrawing to protect his rear. The resultant Battle of Marsaglia on 4 October 1693 ended in a resounding French victory. Turin now lay open to attack but further manpower and supply difficulties prevented Catinat from exploiting his gain, and all the French could get out of their victory was renewed breathing-space to restock what was left of Pinerolo. Elsewhere, Noailles secured the valuable seaport of Rosas in Catalonia on 9 June before withdrawing into Roussillon. When his opponent, Medina-Sidonia, abandoned plans to besiege Bellver, both sides entered winter quarters. Meanwhile, the French navy achieved victory in its final fleet action of the war. On 27 June Tourville's combined Brest and Toulon squadrons ambushed the Smyrna convoy (a fleet of between 200 and 400 Allied merchant vessels travelling under escort to the Mediterranean) as it rounded Cape St. Vincent. The Allies lost approximately 90 merchant ships with a value of some 30 million livres.

=== War and diplomacy: 1694–1695 ===
French arms at Heidelberg, Rosas, Huy, Landen, Charleroi and Marsaglia had achieved considerable battlefield success, but with the severe hardships of 1693 continuing through to the summer of 1694 France was unable to expend the same level of energy and finance for the forthcoming campaign. The crisis reshaped French strategy, forcing commanders to redraft plans to fit the dictates of fiscal shortfalls. In the background, Louis XIV's agents were working hard diplomatically to unhinge the coalition but the Emperor, who had secured with the Allies his 'rights' to the Spanish succession should Charles II die during the conflict, did not desire a peace that would not prove personally advantageous. The Grand Alliance would not come apart as long as there was money available and a belief that the growing strength of their armies would soon be much greater than those of France.

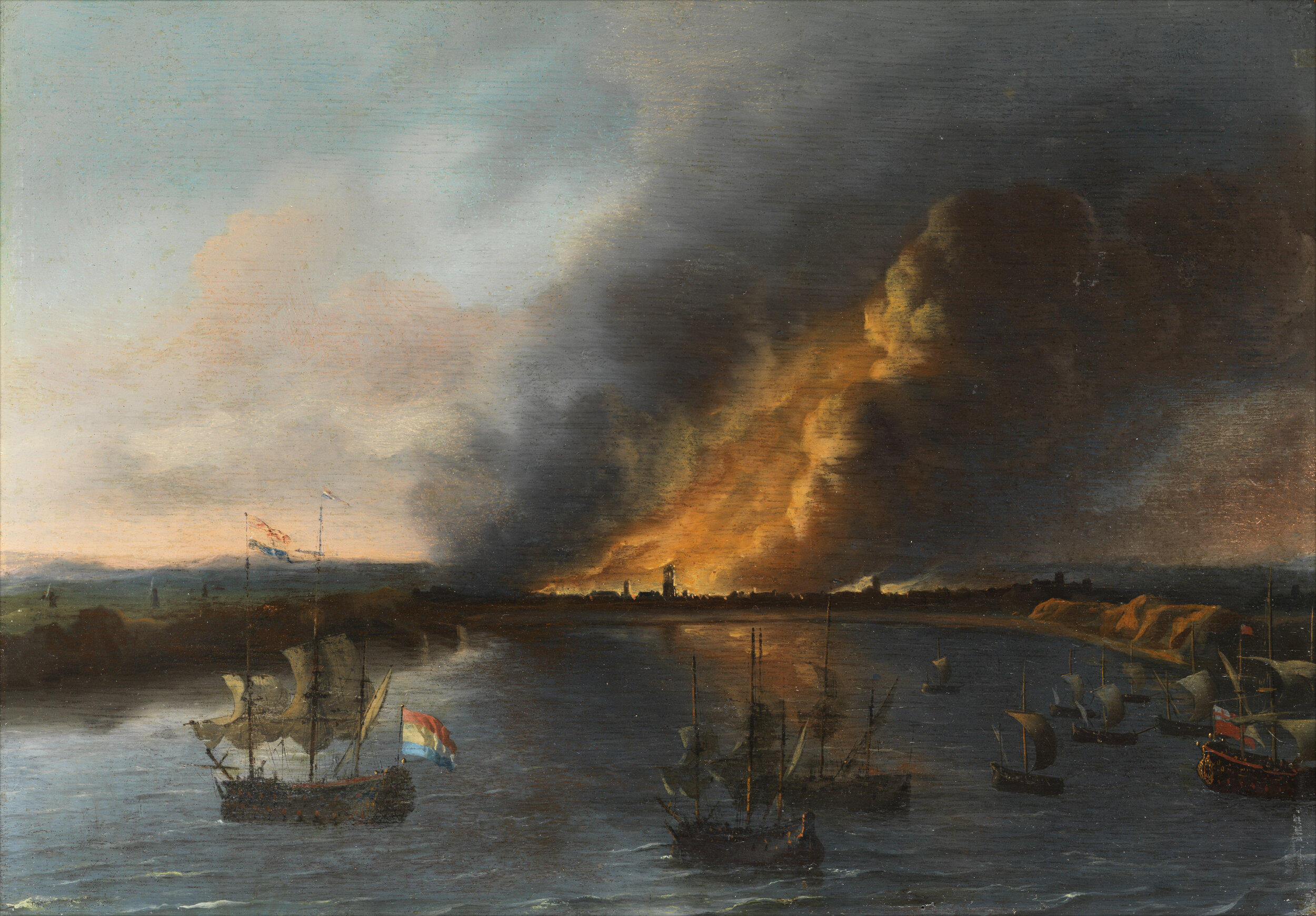
Bombardment of Dieppe, 1694

In the Spanish Netherlands Luxembourg still had 100,000 men; but this time he was outnumbered. Lacking sufficient supplies to mount an attack, Luxembourg was unable to prevent the Allies from capturing Dixmude, and on 27 September 1694 the William III recaptured Huy, an essential preliminary to future operations against Namur. Elsewhere, de Lorge marched and manoeuvred against Baden on the Rhine with undramatic results before the campaign petered out in October; while in Italy, the continuing problems with French finance and a complete breakdown in the supply chain prevented Catinat's push into Piedmont. However, in Catalonia the fighting proved more eventful. On 27 May Marshal Noailles, supported by French warships, soundly defeated the Marquis of Escalona's Spanish forces at the Battle of Torroella on the banks of the river Ter; the French proceeded to take Palamós on 10 June, Gerona on 29 June, and Hostalric, opening the route to Barcelona. With the Spanish King threatening to make a separate peace with France unless the Allies came to his assistance, William III prepared the Anglo-Dutch fleet for action. Part of the fleet under Admiral Berkeley would remain in the north, first leading the disastrous amphibious assault on Brest on 18 June, before bombarding French coastal defences at Dieppe, Saint-Malo, Le Havre, and Calais. The remainder of the fleet under Admiral Russell was ordered to the Mediterranean, linking up with Spanish vessels off Cádiz. The Allied naval presence compelled the French fleet back to the safety of Toulon, which, in turn, forced Noailles to withdraw to the line of the Ter, harassed en route by General Trinxería's miquelets. By shielding Barcelona in this way the Allies kept Spain in the war for two more years.

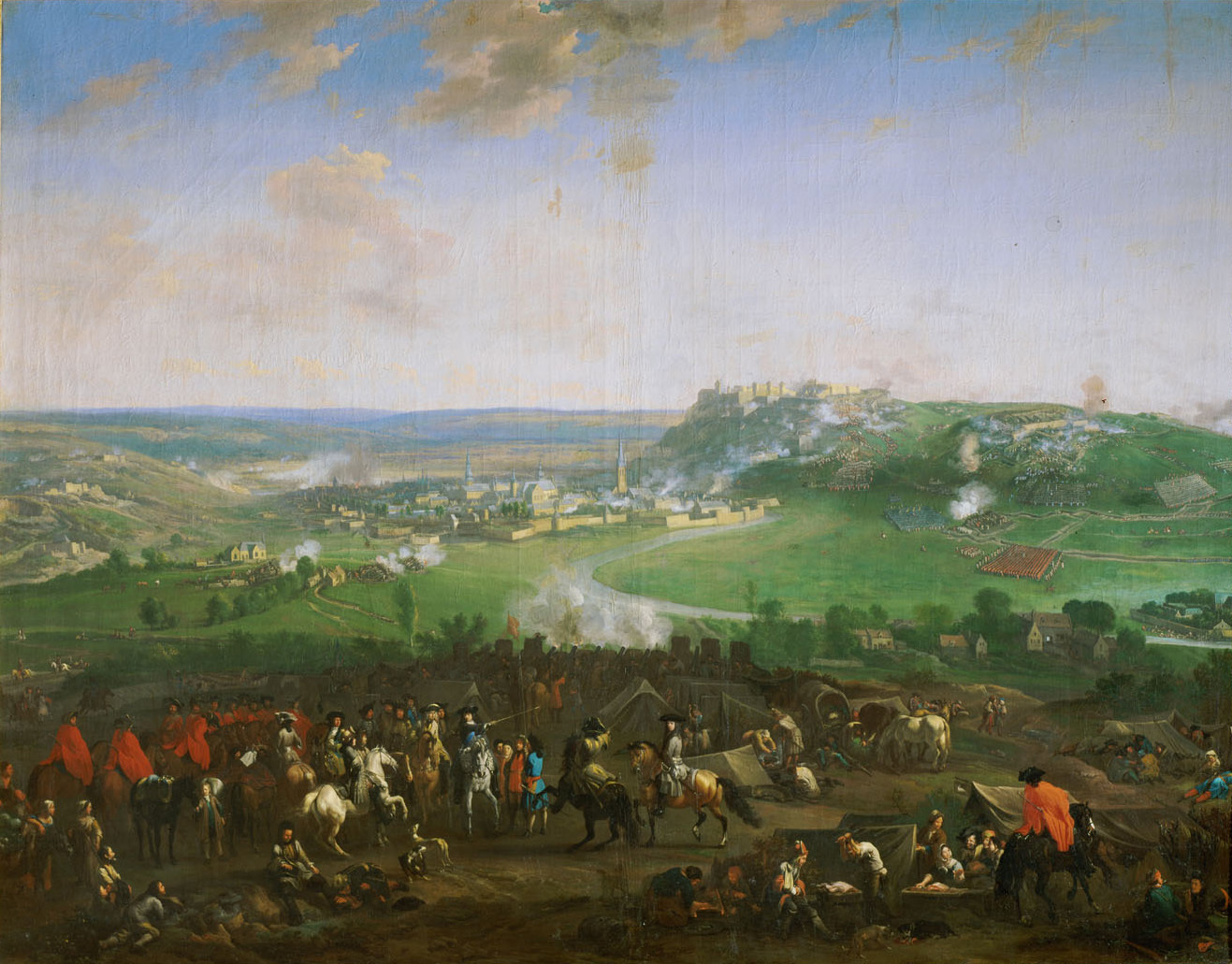
Siege of Namur (1695) by Jan van Huchtenburg

In 1695 French arms suffered two major setbacks: first was the death on 5 January of Louis XIV's greatest general of the period, Marshal Luxembourg (to be succeeded by the Duke of Villeroi); the second was the loss of Namur, which was considered to be the strongest fortress in Europe. In a role reversal of 1692 Coehoorn conducted the siege of the stronghold under William III, and the Electors of Bavaria and Brandenburg. The French had attempted diversions with the bombardment of Brussels, but despite Boufflers' stout defence Namur finally fell on 5 September. (Note: John Childs calls the recapture of Namur the most important event of the Nine Years' War.) The siege had cost the Allies a great deal in men and resources, and had pinned down William III's army through the whole summer campaign; but the recapture of Namur, together with the earlier prize of Huy, had restored the Allied position on the Meuse, secured communications between their armies in the Spanish Netherlands and those on the Moselle and Rhine, while greatly damaging Louis' reputation.

Meanwhile, the recent fiscal crisis had brought about a transformation in French naval strategy – the Maritime Powers now outstripped France in shipbuilding and arming, and increasingly enjoyed a numerical advantage. Suggesting the abandonment of fleet warfare, guerre d'escadre, in favour of commerce-raiding, guerre de course, Vauban advocated the use of the fleet backed by individual shipowners fitting out their own vessels as privateers, aimed at destroying the trade of the Maritime Powers. Vauban argued that this strategic change would deprive the enemy of its economic base without costing Louis XIV money that was far more urgently needed to maintain France's armies on land. Privateers cruising either as individuals or in complete squadrons from Dunkirk, St Malo and the smaller ports, achieved significant success. For example, in 1695, the Marquis of Nesmond, with seven ships of the line, captured vessels from the English East India Company that were said to have yielded 10 million livres. In May 1696, Jean Bart slipped the blockade of Dunkirk and struck a Dutch convoy in the North Sea, burning 45 of its ships; on 18 June 1696 he won the battle at Dogger Bank; and in May 1697, the Baron of Pointis with another privateer squadron attacked and seized Cartagena, earning him, and the king, a share of 10 million livres.

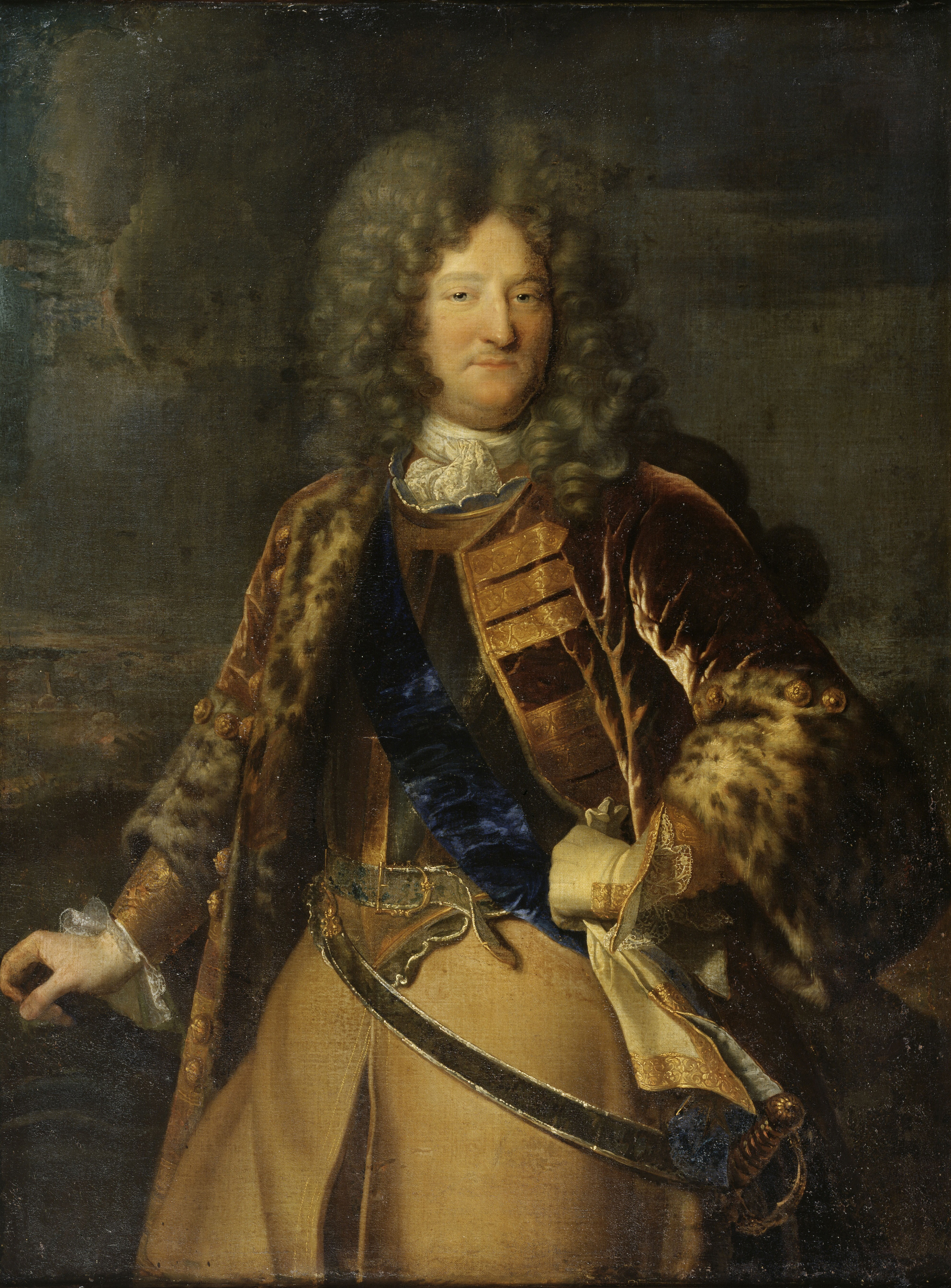
Duke of Noailles (1650–1708). Due to illness Vendôme replaced Noailles as French commander in Catalonia in 1695.

For their part, the Allied navy expended more shells on St Malo, Granville, Calais, and Dunkirk; likewise on Palamos in Catalonia where Charles II had appointed the Marquis of Gastañaga as the governor-general. The Allies sent Austrian and German reinforcements under Prince George of Hesse-Darmstadt, a cousin of the Queen of Spain, while the French replaced the ailing Noailles with the Duke of Vendôme who would become one of Louis XIV's best generals. But the balance of military power was turning dangerously against the French. In Spain, in the Rhineland, and in the Low Countries, Louis XIV's forces only barely held their own: the bombardment of the French channel ports, the threats of invasion, and the loss of Namur were causes of great anxiety for the King at Versailles.

In the meantime the diplomatic breakthrough was made in Italy. For two years the Duke of Savoy's Minister of Finance, Gropello, and the Count of Tessé (Catinat's second-in-command), had secretly been negotiating a bi-lateral agreement to end the war in Italy. Central to the discussions were the two French fortresses that flanked the Duke's territory – Pinerolo and Casale, the latter now completely cut off from French assistance. By now Victor Amadeus had come to fear the growth of Imperial military power and political influence in the region (now more than he feared the French) and the threat it posed to Savoyard independence. Knowing, therefore, that the Imperials were planning to besiege Casale the Duke proposed that the French garrison surrender to him following a token show of force, after which the fortifications would be dismantled and handed back to the Duke of Mantua. Louis XIV was compelled to accept, and after a sham siege and nominal resistance Casale surrendered to Amadeus on 9 July 1695; by mid-September the place had been razed.

=== Road to Ryswick: 1696–1697 ===
In the winter of 1695–1696, Louis XIV had come to the conclusion that he had been drawn into an unwinnable war of attrition by the maritime powers. He therefore initiated peace talks with William III. However, William only wanted to make peace after bringing Louis to his knees and therefore planned a large offensive in the Spanish Netherlands, but a monetary crisis in England made this impossible. A French counter-offensive was prevented by the Bombardment of Givet, while a plan for an invasion of England had earlier been discarded after the Jacobite assassination plot on William was discovered. Most other fronts were also relatively quiet throughout 1696: the armies along the Rhine, and in Catalonia, marched and counter-marched but little was achieved. Louis XIV's hesitancy to engage with the Allies (despite the confidence of his generals) may have reflected his knowledge of the secret talks that had begun more than a year earlier – with François de Callières acting for Louis XIV, and Jacob Boreel and Everhard van Weede Dijkvelt representing the Dutch. By the spring of 1696 the talks covered the whole panorama of problems that were proving an obstacle to peace. The most difficult of these were the recognition of the Prince of Orange as the King of England and the subsequent status of James II in France; the Dutch demand for a barrier against future French aggression; French tariffs on Dutch commerce; and the territorial settlements in the Rhine–Moselle areas regarding the Reunions and the recent conquests, particularly the strategically important city of Strasbourg. Louis XIV had succeeded in establishing the principle that a new treaty would be fixed within the framework of the Treaties of Westphalia and Nijmegen, and the Truce of Ratisbon, but with the Emperor's demands for Strasbourg, and William III's insistence that he be recognized as King of England before the conclusion of hostilities, it hardly seemed worthwhile in calling for a peace conference.

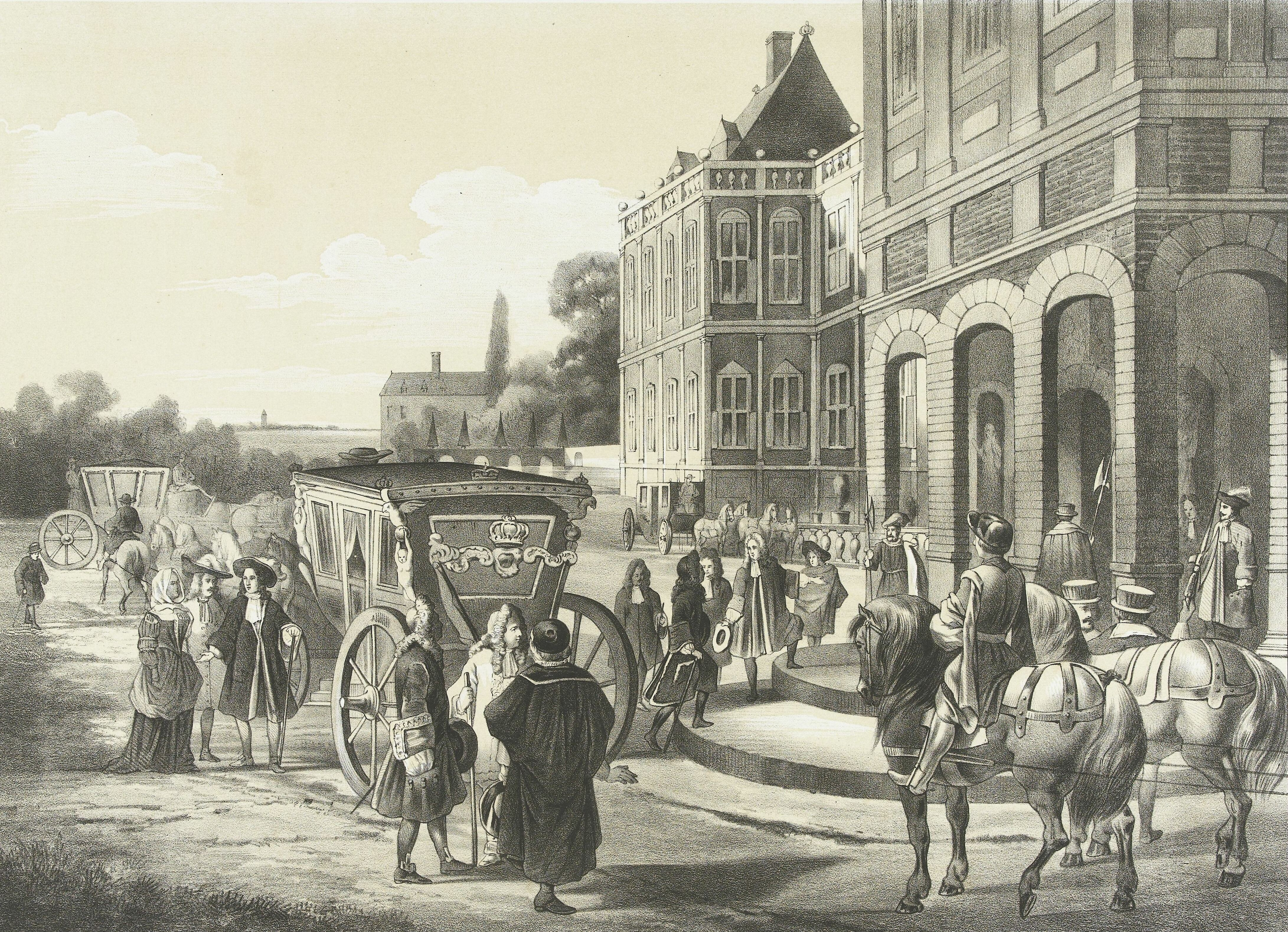
19th century depiction of the arrival of diplomats in Ryswick

In Italy the secret negotiations were proving more productive, with the French possession of Pinerolo now central to the talks. When Amadeus threatened to besiege Pinerolo the French, concluding that its defence was not now possible, agreed to hand back the stronghold on condition that its fortifications were demolished. The terms were formalised as the Treaty of Turin on 29 August 1696, by which provision Louis XIV also returned, intact, Montmélian, Nice, Villefranche, Susa, and other small towns. (Note: Rowlands describes this as little short of a humiliation for Louis XIV when set alongside French demands in the summer of 1690.) Amongst other concessions Louis XIV also promised not to interfere in Savoy's religious policy regarding the Vaudois, provided the Duke prevents any communication between them and French Huguenots. In return, Amadeus agreed to abandon the Grand Alliance and join with Louis XIV – if necessary – to secure the neutralisation of northern Italy. The Emperor, diplomatically outmanoeuvred, was compelled to accept peace in the region by signing the Treaty of Vigevano of 7 October, to which the French immediately acceded. Italy was neutralised and the Nine Years' War in the peninsula came to an end. Savoy had emerged as an independent sovereign House and a key second-rank power: the Alps, rather than the River Po, would be the boundary of France in the south-east.

The Treaty of Turin started a scramble for peace. With the continual disruption of trade and commerce politicians from England and the Dutch Republic were desirous for an end to the war. France was also facing economic exhaustion, but above all Louis XIV was becoming convinced that Charles II of Spain was near death and he knew that the break-up of the coalition would be essential if France was to benefit from the dynastic battle ahead. The contending parties agreed to meet at Ryswick (Rijswijk) and come to a negotiated settlement. But as talks continued through 1697, so did the fighting, and on 16 April the Allies, under Maximilian of Bavaria, re-took Deinze. The main French goal that year in the Spanish Netherlands was Ath. Vauban and Catinat (now with troops freed from the Italian front) invested the town on 15 May while Marshals Boufflers and Villeroi covered the siege; after an assault on 5 June the Count of Roeux surrendered and the garrison marched out two days later. The Rhineland theatre in 1697 was again quiet: the French commander, Marshal Choiseul (who had replaced the sick de Lorge the previous year), was content to remain behind his fortified lines. Although Baden took Ebernburg on 27 September, news of the peace brought an end to the desultory campaign, and both armies drew back from one another. In Catalonia, however, French forces (now also reinforced with troops from Italy) achieved considerable success when Vendôme, commanding some 32,000 troops, besieged and captured Barcelona. The garrison, under Prince George of Hesse-Darmstadt, capitulated on 10 August. Yet it had been a hard-fought contest: French casualties amounted to about 9,000, and the Spanish had suffered some 12,000 killed, wounded or lost.

== North American theatre (King William's War) ==
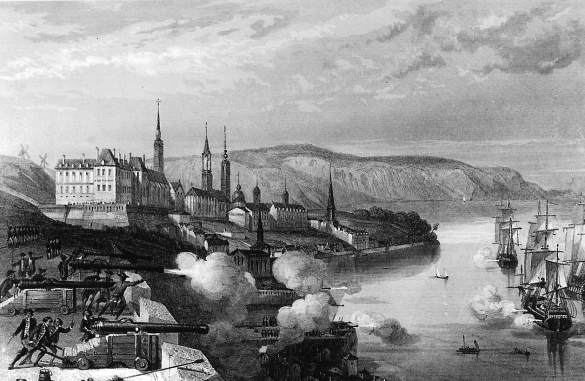
19th-century print showing Quebec batteries firing on William Phips' squadron during October 1690.

The European war was reflected in North America, where it was known as King William's War, though the North American contest was very different in meaning and scale. The European war declaration arrived amid long-running tensions over control of the fur trade, economically vital to both French and English colonies, and influence over the Iroquois, who controlled much of that trade. The French were determined to hold the St. Lawrence country and to extend their power over the vast basin of the Mississippi. Moreover, Hudson Bay was a focal point of dispute between the Protestant English and Catholic French colonists, both of whom claimed a share of its territory and trade. Although important to the colonists, the North American theatre of the Nine Years' War was of secondary importance to European statesmen. Despite numerical superiority, the English colonists suffered repeated defeats as New France effectively organised its French regulars, local militiamen and Indian allies (notably the Algonquins and Abenakis), to attack frontier settlements. Almost all resources sent to the colonies by England were to defend the English West Indies, the "crown jewels" of the empire.

Friction over Indian relations worsened in 1688 with French incursions against the Iroquois in upstate New York, and with Indian raids against smaller settlements in Maine. The Governor General of New France, Louis de Buade de Frontenac, capitalising on disorganisation in New York and New England following the collapse of the Dominion of New England, expanded the war with a series of raids on the northern borders of the English settlements: first was the destruction of Dover, New Hampshire, in July 1689; followed by Pemaquid, Maine, in August. In February 1690 Schenectady in New York was attacked; massacres at Salmon Falls and Casco Bay followed. In response, on 1 May 1690 at the Albany Conference, colonial representatives elected to invade French Canada. In August a land force commanded by Colonel Winthrop set off for Montreal, while a naval force, commanded by the future governor of Massachusetts, Sir William Phips (who earlier on 11 May had seized the capital of French Acadia, Port Royal), set sail for Quebec via the St. Lawrence River. They were repulsed in the Battle of Quebec and the expedition on the St Lawrence failed, while the French retook Port Royal.

The war dragged on for several years longer in a series of desultory sallies and frontier raids: neither the leaders in England nor France thought of weakening their position in Europe for the sake of a knock-out blow in North America. By the terms of the Treaty of Ryswick, the boundaries and outposts of New France, New England, and New York remained substantially unchanged. In Newfoundland and Hudson's Bay French influence now predominated but William III, who had made the interests of the Bay Company a cause of war in North America, was not prepared to hazard his European policy for the sake of their pursuit. The Five Nations, abandoned by their English allies, were obliged to open separate negotiations, and by the treaty of 1701 they agreed to remain neutral in any future Anglo-French conflicts.

== Asia and the Caribbean ==
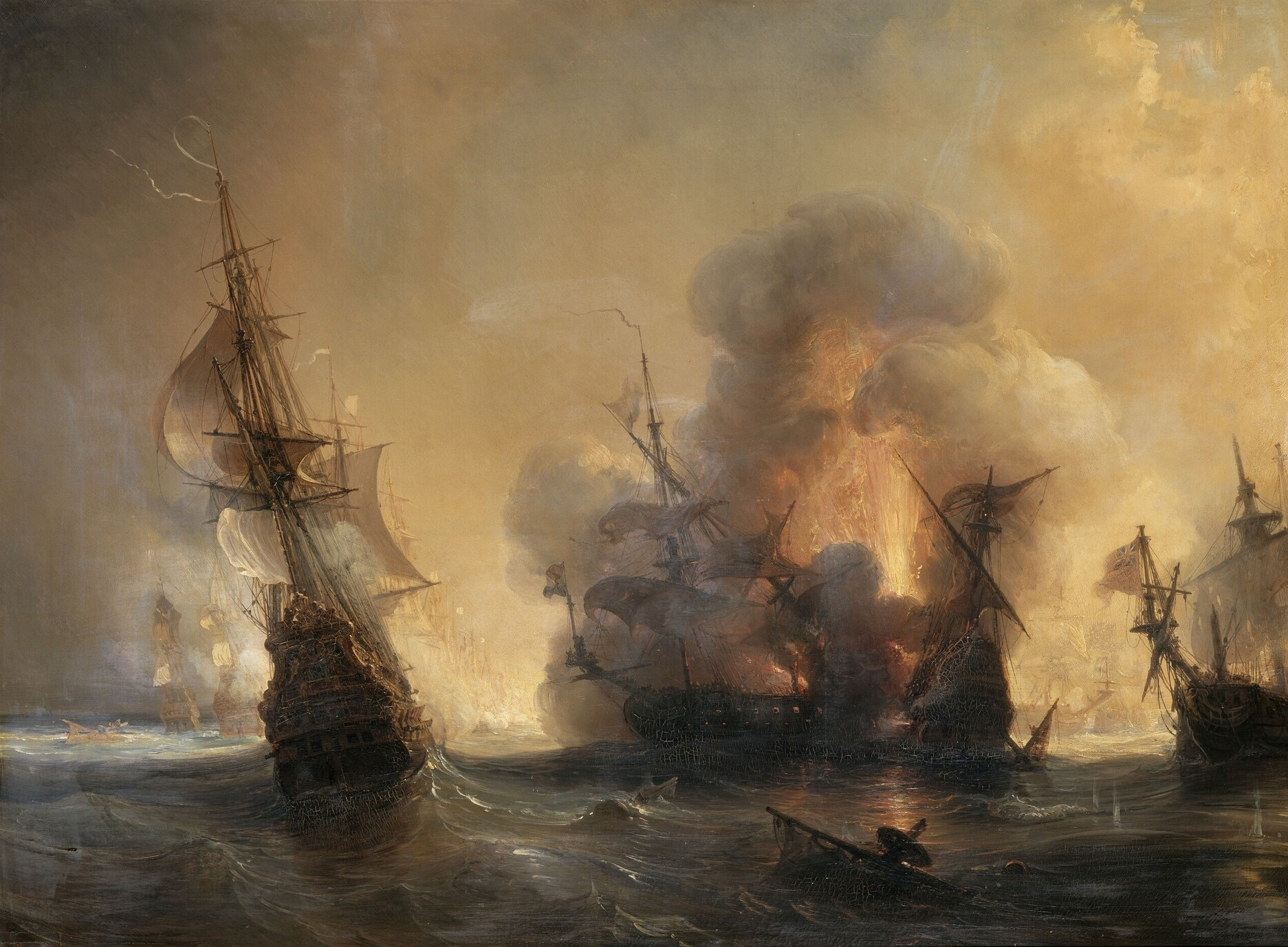
The Battle of Lagos, June 1693. French victory and the capture of the Smyrna convoy was the most significant English mercantile loss of the war.

When news of the European war reached Asia, English, French and Dutch colonial governors and merchants quickly took up the struggle. In October 1690 the French Admiral Abraham Duquesne-Guitton sailed into Madras to bombard the Anglo-Dutch fleet; this attack proved foolhardy but extended the war into the Far East. In 1693 the Dutch launched an expedition against their French commercial rivals at Pondichéry on the south-eastern coast of India; the small garrison under François Martin was overwhelmed and surrendered on 6 September.

The Caribbean and the Americas were historically an area of conflict between England and Spain but the two were now allies. Outside North America, French interests were far less significant. Saint Kitts twice changed hands. There was sporadic conflict in Jamaica, Martinique and Hispaniola, but mutual suspicion between the English and Spanish limited joint operations. The Allies had the naval advantage in these isolated areas, though it proved impossible to keep the French from supplying their colonial forces.

By 1693, it was clear the campaigns in Flanders had not dealt a decisive blow to either the Dutch Republic or England, so the French switched to attacking their trade. The Battle of Lagos in 1693 and the loss of the Smyrna convoy caused intense anger among English merchants who demanded increased global protection from the navy. In 1696, a combination of regular French naval forces and privateers went to the Caribbean hoping to intercept the Spanish silver fleet; this was a double threat since capture of the silver would give France a major financial boost and the Spanish ships also carried English cargoes. The strategy failed, but combined with de Pointis' expedition of 1697, it demonstrated the vulnerability of English interests in the Caribbean and North America; their protection in future conflicts became a matter of urgency. In May 1697 French naval forces raided Cartagena and plundered the city.

== Treaty of Ryswick ==
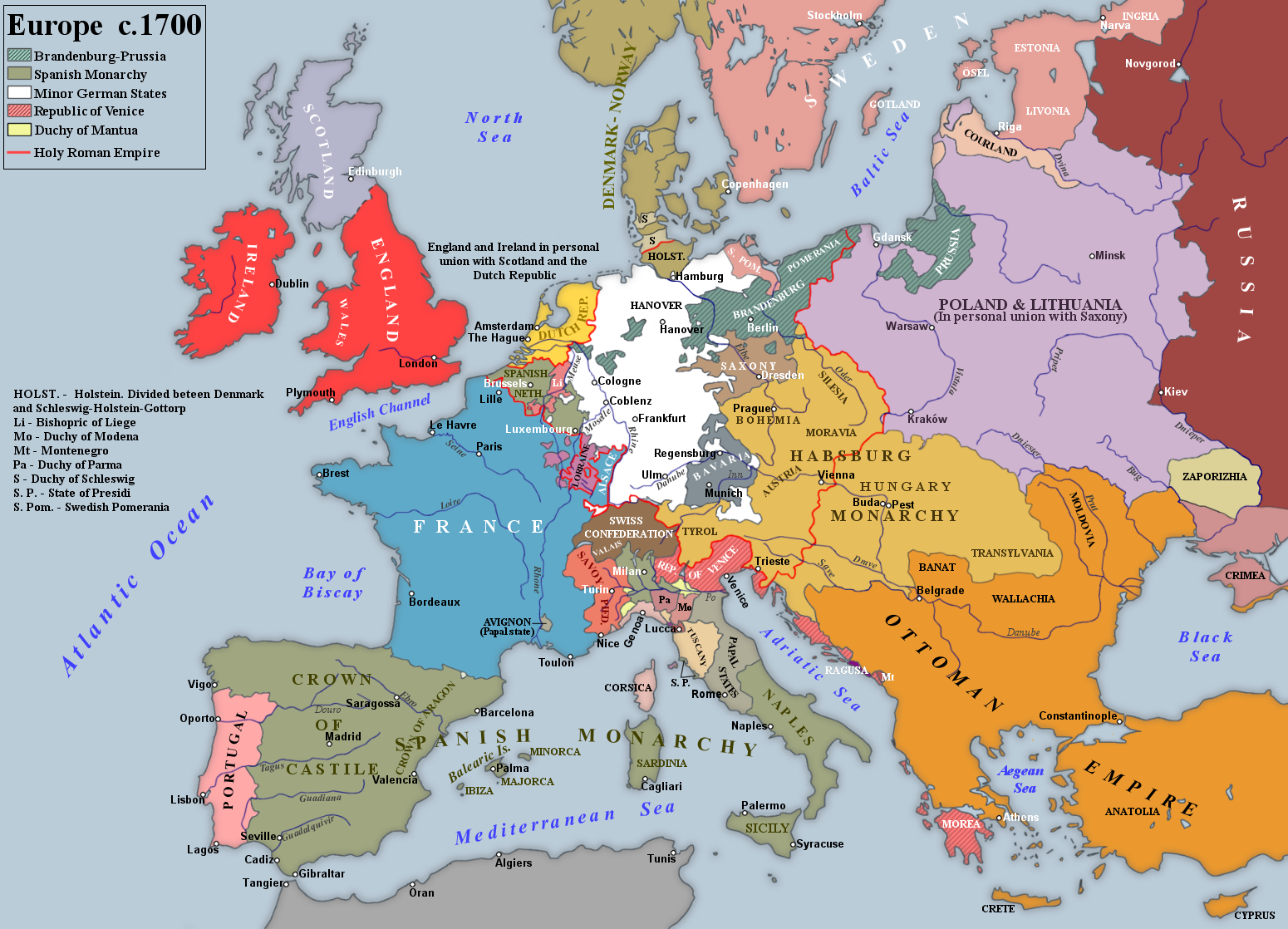
Map of European borders as they stood after the Treaty of Ryswick and just prior to Louis XIV's last great war, the War of the Spanish Succession.

The peace conference opened in May 1697 in William III's palace at Ryswick near The Hague. The Swedes were the official mediators, but it was through the private efforts of Boufflers and William Bentinck, the Earl of Portland that the major issues were resolved. William III had no intention of continuing the war or pressing for Leopold I's claims in the Rhineland or for the Spanish succession: it seemed more important for Dutch and British security to obtain Louis XIV's recognition of the 1688 revolution.

By the terms of the Treaty of Ryswick, Louis XIV kept the whole of Alsace, including Strasbourg. Lorraine returned to its duke (although France retained rights to march troops through the territory), and the French abandoned all gains on the right bank of the Rhine – Philppsburg, Breisach, Freiburg and Kehl. Additionally, the new French fortresses of La Pile, Mont Royal and Fort Louis were to be demolished. To win favour with Madrid over the Spanish succession question, Louis XIV evacuated Catalonia in Spain and Luxembourg, Chimay, Mons, Courtrai, Charleroi and Ath in the Low Countries. The Maritime Powers asked for no territory, but the Dutch were given a favourable commercial treaty, of which the most important provision was to relax regulations to favour Dutch trade and return to the French tariff of 1664. Although Louis XIV continued to shelter James II, he now recognised William III as King of England, and undertook not to actively support the candidature of James II's son. He also gave way over the Palatinate and Cologne issues.

In North America, positions returned to those prevailing before the war, with France regaining Acadia, although in reality low-level conflict persisted around the boundaries. Conversely, in the Caribbean Spain recognized French control of the western portion of Hispaniola and the island of Tortuga; France had in fact established its colony of Saint-Domingue years earlier. Meanwhile, the Dutch returned the colony of Pondichéry in India to France.

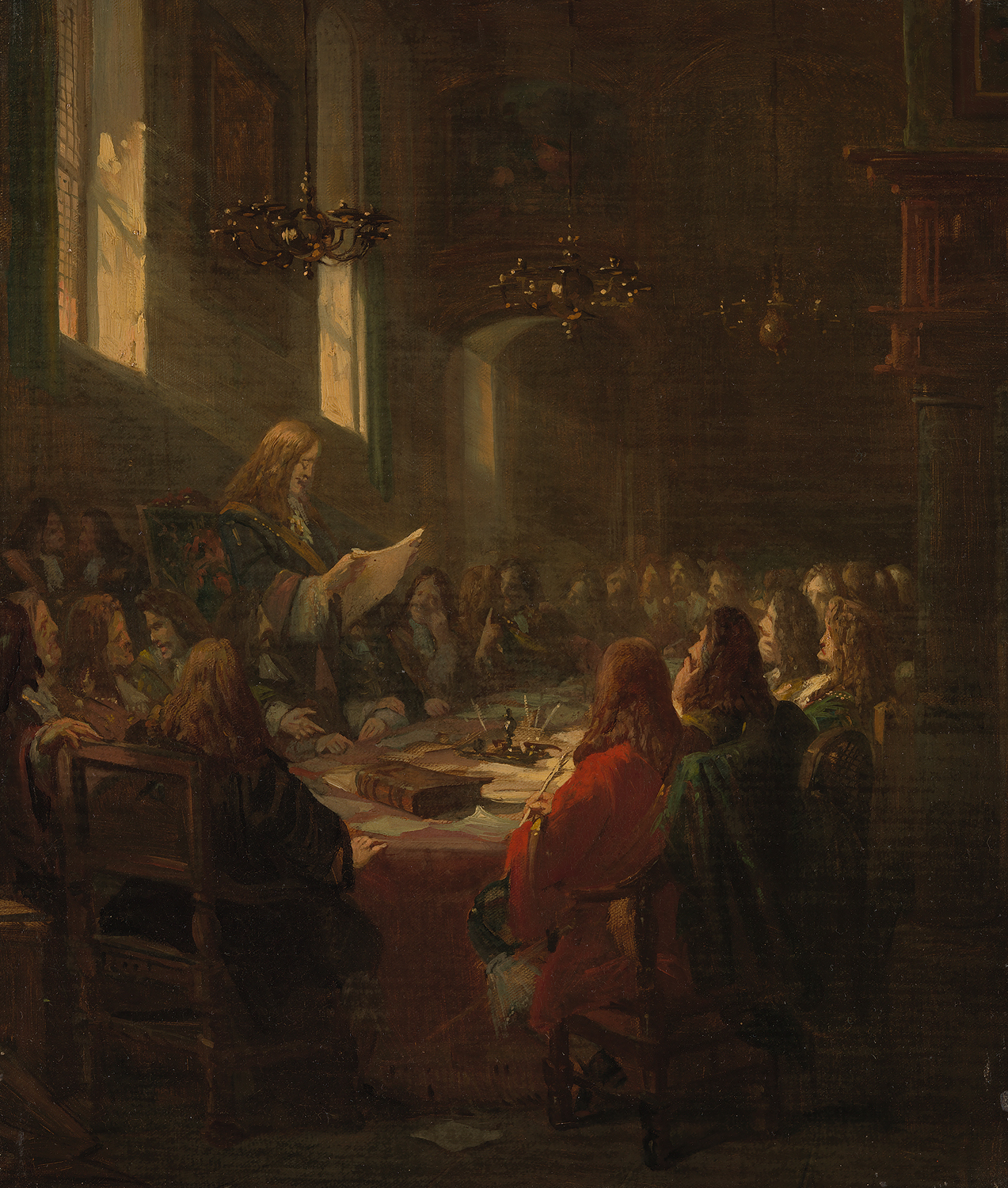
The Peace of Ryswick 1697, by Barend Wijnveld

The representatives of the Dutch Republic, England, and Spain signed the treaty on 20 September 1697. Emperor Leopold I, desperate for a continuation of the war so as to strengthen his own claims to the Spanish succession, initially resisted the treaty, but because he was still at war with the Turks and could not face fighting France alone, he also sought terms and signed on 30 October. The Emperor's finances were in a bad state, and the dissatisfaction aroused by the raising of Hanover to electoral rank had impaired Leopold I's influence in Germany. The Protestant princes had also blamed him for the religious clause in the treaty, which stipulated that the lands of the Reunions that France was to surrender would remain Catholic, even those that had been forcibly converted – a clear defiance of the Westphalia settlement. However, the Emperor had netted an enormous accretion of power: Leopold I's son, Joseph, had been named King of the Romans (1690), and the Emperor's candidate for the Polish throne, August of Saxony, had carried the day over Louis XIV's candidate, the Prince of Conti. Additionally, Prince Eugene of Savoy's decisive victory over the Ottoman Turks at the Battle of Zenta – leading to the Treaty of Karlowitz in 1699 – consolidated the Austrian Habsburgs and tipped the European balance of power in favour of the Emperor.

The war had allowed William III to destroy militant Jacobitism and helped bring Scotland and Ireland under more direct control. England emerged as a great economic and naval power and became an important player in European affairs, allowing her to use her wealth and energy in world politics to the fullest advantage. William III also continued to prioritise the security of the Dutch Republic, and in 1698 the Dutch garrisoned a series of fortresses in the Spanish Netherlands as a barrier to French attack – future foreign policy would centre on the maintenance and extension of these barrier fortresses. However, the question of the Spanish inheritance was not discussed at Ryswick, and it remained the most important unsolved question of European politics. Within three years Charles II of Spain would be dead, and Louis XIV and the Grand Alliance would again plunge Europe into conflict – the War of the Spanish Succession.

== Weapons, technology, and the art of war ==
=== Military developments ===
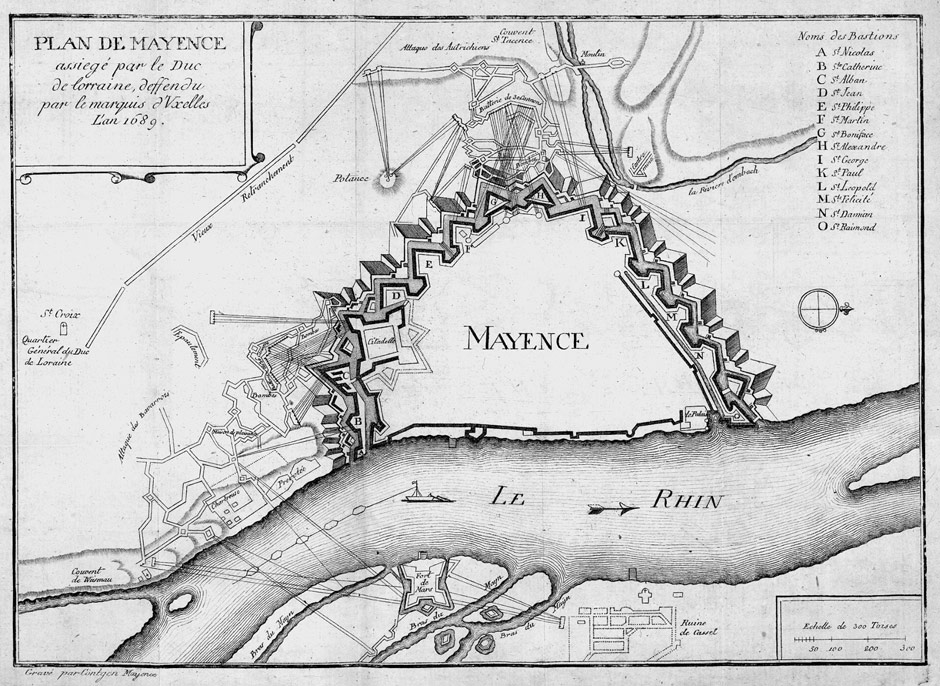
Siege of Mainz, 1689. Many of the larger fortified complexes had citadels. Once the town had been captured the garrison would withdraw into the citadel, which then had to be separately reduced.

The campaign season typically lasted from May through October. Winter campaigns were rare for lack of animal fodder, but the French practice of storing food and provisions in magazines brought them considerable advantage, often enabling them to take to the field weeks before their foes. Nevertheless, military operations during the Nine Years' War did not produce decisive results. The war was dominated by what may be called "positional warfare" – the construction, defence, and attack of fortresses and entrenched lines. Positional warfare played a wide variety of roles: fortresses controlled bridgeheads and passes, guarded supply routes, and served as storehouses and magazines. However, fortresses hampered the ability to follow success on the battlefield – defeated armies could flee to friendly fortifications, enabling them to recover and rebuild their numbers from less threatened fronts. Many lesser commanders welcomed these relatively predictable, static operations to mask their lack of military ability. As Daniel Defoe observed in 1697, "Now it is frequent to have armies of 50,000 men of a side spend the whole campaign in dodging – or, as it is genteelly called – observing one another, and then march off into winter quarters." In fact, during the Nine Years' War, field armies had waxed to nearly 100,000 men in 1695, the strain of which had reduced the Maritime Powers to a fiscal crisis while the French struggled under the weight of a shattered economy. Yet there were aggressive commanders: William III, Boufflers, and Luxembourg had the will to win but their methods were hampered by numbers, supply, and communications. The French commanders were also restricted by Louis XIV and Louvois who distrusted field campaigns, preferring Vauban, the taker of fortifications, rather than campaigns of movement.

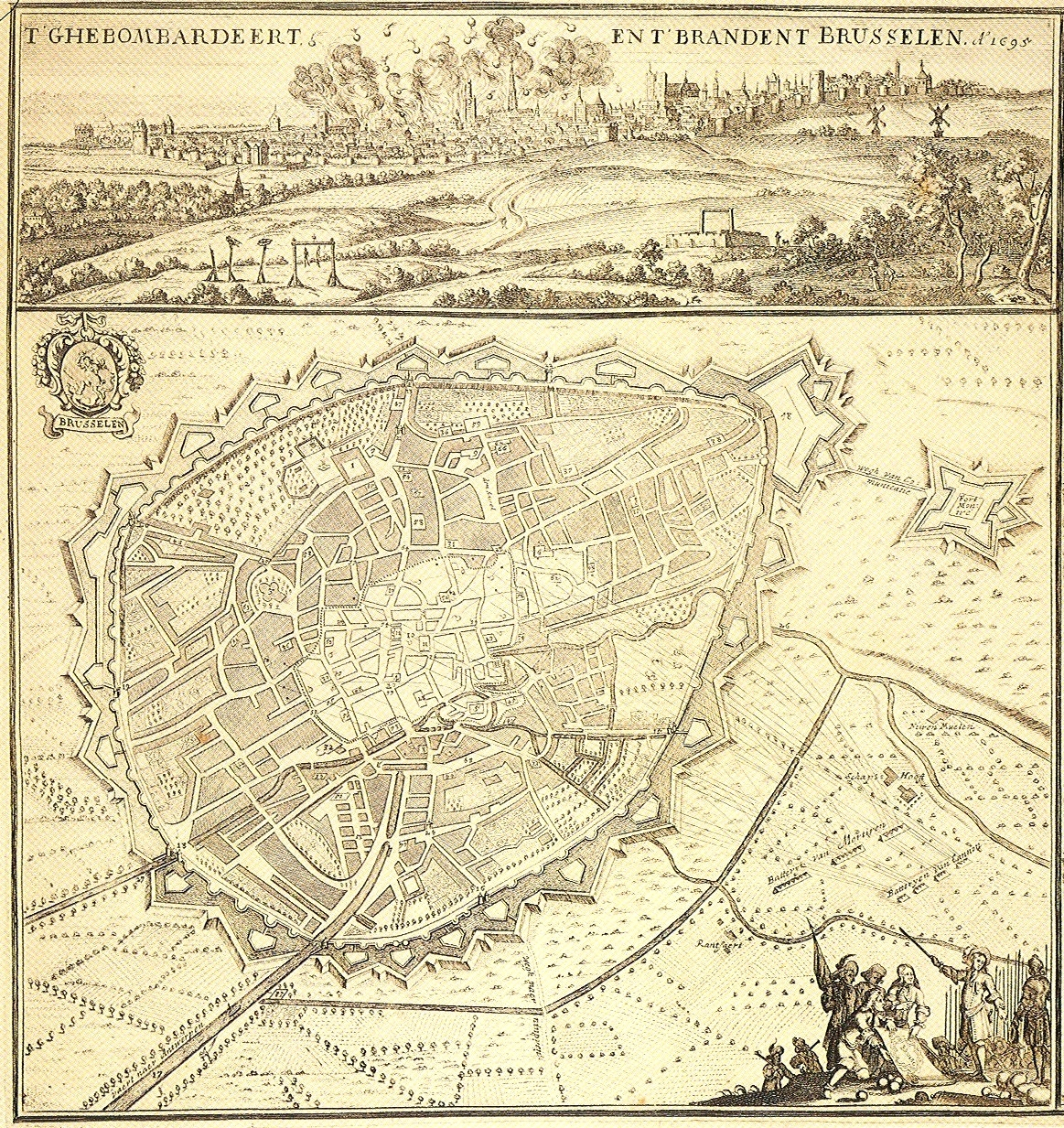
Bombardment of Brussels, 1695. Fortifications consisted of low-level, geometric earthworks; the ground plan was polygonal with a pentangle bastion at each salient angle, covered by ravelins, hornworks, crownworks, and demi-lunes.

Another contributing factor for the lack of decisive action was the necessity to fight for secure resources. Armies were expected to support themselves in the field by imposing contributions (taxing local populations) upon a hostile, or even neutral, territory. Subjecting a particular area to contributions was deemed more important than pursuing a defeated army from the battlefield to destroy it. It was primarily financial concerns and availability of resources that shaped campaigns, as armies struggled to outlast the enemy in a long war of attrition. The only decisive action during the whole war came in Ireland where William III crushed the forces of James II in a campaign for legitimacy and control of Britain and Ireland. But, unlike Ireland, Louis XIV's continental wars were never fought without compromise: the fighting provided a foundation for diplomatic negotiations and did not dictate a solution.

The major advancement in weapon technology in the 1690s was the introduction of the flintlock musket. The new firing mechanism provided superior rates of fire and accuracy over the cumbersome matchlocks. But the adoption of the flintlock was uneven, and, until 1697, for every three Allied soldiers that were equipped with the new muskets, two soldiers were still handicapped by matchlocks: French second-line troops were issued matchlocks as late as 1703. These weapons were further enhanced with the development of the socket-bayonet. Its predecessor, the plug bayonet – jammed down the firearm's barrel – not only prevented the musket from firing but was also a clumsy weapon that took time to fix properly, and even more time to unfix. In contrast, the socket-bayonet could be drawn over the musket's muzzle and locked into place by a lug, converting the musket into a short pike yet leaving it capable of fire. The disadvantage of the pike came to be widely recognised: at the Battle of Fleurus in 1690, German battalions armed only with muskets repulsed French cavalry attacks more effectively than units conventionally armed with pikes, while Catinat had abandoned his pikes altogether before undertaking his Alpine campaign against Savoy.

=== Naval developments ===
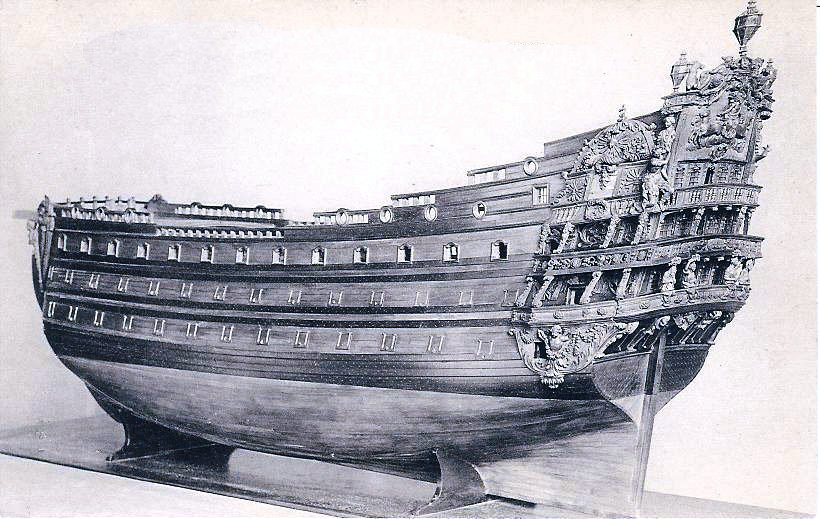
French warship Soleil Royal

In 1688 the most powerful navies were the French, English, and Dutch; the Spanish and Portuguese navies had suffered serious declines in the 17th century. The largest French ships of the period were the Soleil Royal and the Royal Louis, but while each was rated for 120 guns, they never carried this full complement and were too large for practical purposes: the former only sailed on one campaign and was destroyed at La Hogue; the latter languished in port until sold in 1694. By the 1680s, French ship-design was at least equal to its English and Dutch counterparts, and by the Nine Years' War the French fleet had surpassed ships of the Royal Navy, whose designs stagnated in the 1690s. Innovation in the Royal Navy, however, did not cease. At some stage in the 1690s, for example, English ships began to employ the ship's wheel, greatly improving their performance, particularly in heavy weather. (The French navy did not adopt the wheel for another thirty years.)

Combat between naval fleets was decided by cannon duels delivered by ships in line of battle; fireships were also used but were mainly successful against anchored and stationary targets, while the new bomb vessels operated best in bombarding targets on shore. Sea battles rarely proved decisive. Fleets faced the almost impossible task of inflicting enough damage on ships and men to win a clear victory: ultimate success depended not on tactical brilliance but on sheer weight of numbers. Here Louis XIV was at a disadvantage: without as large a maritime commerce as benefited the Allies, the French were unable to supply as many experienced sailors for their navy. Most importantly, though, Louis XIV had to concentrate his resources on the army at the expense of the fleet, enabling the Dutch, and the English in particular, to outdo the French in ship construction. However, naval actions were comparatively uncommon and, just like battles on land, the goal was generally to outlast rather than to destroy one's opponent. Louis XIV regarded his navy as an extension of his army – the French fleet's most important role was to protect the French coast from enemy invasion. Louis used his fleet to support land and amphibious operations or the bombardment of coastal targets, designed to draw enemy resources from elsewhere and thus aid his land campaigns on the continent.

Once the Allies had secured a clear superiority in numbers the French found it prudent not to contest them in fleet action. At the start of the Nine Years' War the French fleet had 118 rated vessels and a total of 295 ships of all types. By the end of the war the French had 137 rated ships. In contrast, the English fleet started the war with 173 vessels of all types, and ended it with 323. Between 1694 and 1697 the French built 19 first- to fifth-rated ships; the English built 58 such vessels, and the Dutch constructed 22. Thus the maritime powers outbuilt the French at a rate of four vessels to one.

== Sources ==
- Aubrey, Philip (1979). The Defeat of James Stuart's Armada 1692. Leicester University Press. ISBN 0-71851168-9.
- Bartlett, Thomas; Jeffery, Keith (1997). A Military History of Ireland. Cambridge UP.
- Bromley, J. S., ed. (1971). The New Cambridge Modern History. Vol. VI: The Rise of Great Britain and Russia 1688–1725. Cambridge University Press. ISBN 0-52107524-6.
- Chandler, David G. (1990). The Art of Warfare in the Age of Marlborough. Spellmount Limited. ISBN 0-94677142-1.
- —— (2003). Marlborough as Military Commander. Spellmount. ISBN 978-1-86227-195-1.
- Childs, John (1991). The Nine Years' War and the British Army. Manchester University Press. ISBN 0-71903461-2.
- —— (2003). Warfare in the Seventeenth Century. Cassell. ISBN 0-30436373-1.
- Clark, George (1971), The Nine Years' War, pp. 223–267 in Bromley (1971).
- Doyle, William (2001). Short Oxford History of France – Old Regime France. Oxford University Press. ISBN 0-19873129-9.
- Elson, Henry William (1908). History of the United States of America. Vol. 1. The MacMillan Company.
- Harris, Tim (2006). Revolution: The Great Crisis of the British Monarchy, 1685–1720. Allen Lane. ISBN 978-0-7139-9759-0.
- Glete, Jan (2001). War and the State in Early Modern Europe; Spain, the Dutch Republic and Sweden as Fiscal-Military States, 1500–1660. Routledge. ISBN 978-0-41522645-5.
- Kinross, John (1998). The Boyne and Aughrim: The War of the Two Kings. Windrush Press. ISBN 1-90062407-9.
- Lovejoy, David (1987). The Glorious Revolution in America. Wesleyan University Press. ISBN 978-0-8195-6177-0.
- Lynn, John A. (1999). The Wars of Louis XIV: 1667–1714. Longman. ISBN 0-58205629-2.
- —— (2020). "States in Conflict, 1661–1763". The Cambridge History of Warfare (2nd ed.). pp. 167–189.
- Magennis, Eoin (1998). "A 'Beleaguered Protestant'?: Walter Harris and the Writing of Fiction Unmasked in Mid-18th-Century Ireland". Eighteenth-Century Ireland. 13: 6–111. doi:10.3828/eci.1998.8. JSTOR 30064327. S2CID 256129781.
- McKay, Derek; Scott, H. M. (1983). The Rise of the Great Powers: 1648–1815. Longman. ISBN 0-58248554-1.
- Miller, John (1978). James II: A Study in Kingship. Menthuen. ISBN 978-0-41365290-4.
- Prud'homme van Reine, Ronald (2009). Opkomst en Ondergang van Nederlands Gouden Vloot – Door de ogen van de zeeschilders Willem van de Velde de Oude en de Jonge (in Dutch). Amsterdam: De Arbeiderspers. ISBN 978-90-295-6696-4..
- Rodger, N. A. M. (2004). The Command of the Ocean: A Naval History of Britain 1649–1815. Penguin Group. ISBN 978-0-393-06050-8.
- Rowlands, Guy (2000). "Louis XIV, Vittorio Amedeo II and French Military Failure in Italy, 1689–96". The English Historical Review. 115 (462): 534–569. doi:10.1093/ehr/115.462.534.
- Simms, Brendan (2008). Three Victories and a Defeat: The Rise and Fall of the First British Empire. Penguin. ISBN 978-0-14028984-8.
- Spielman, John (1977). Leopold I of Austria. Thames & Hudson. ISBN 0-50087005-5.
- Stapleton, John M. (2003). Forging a Coalition Army: William III, the Grand Alliance, and the Confederate Army in the Spanish Netherlands, 1688–1697. Ohio State University. Archived from the original on 13 March 2022.
- Symcox, Geoffrey, ed. (1973). War, Diplomacy, and Imperialism: 1618–1763. Harper & Row. ISBN 0-06139500-5.
- Taylor, Alan. American Colonies: The Settling of North America. Penguin, 2002. ISBN 0-14200210-0.
- Van Nimwegen, Olaf (2020). De Veertigjarige Oorlog 1672–1712: de strijd van de Nederlanders tegen de Zonnekoning [The 40 Years' War 1672–1712: the Dutch struggle against the Sun King] (in Dutch). Prometheus. ISBN 978-90-446-3871-4.
- Western, John R. (1972). Monarchy and Revolution. The English State in the 1680s. London: Blandford Press. ISBN 978-0-7137-3280-1.
- Wijn, J. W. (1950). Het Staatsche Leger: Deel VII [The Dutch States Army: Part VII] (in Dutch). Martinus Nijhoff.
- Wilson, Peter (2016). Heart of Europe: A History of the Holy Roman Empire. Cambridge, MA: Belknap Press.
- Wolf, John B. (1962). The Emergence of the Great Powers; 1685–1715. Harper & Row.
- —— (1970) [1968]. Louis XIV. London: Panther. ISBN 978-0-58603332-6.
