= French Royal Army =

Principal army of the Kingdom of France

- The coat of arms of France
- Active: 1652–1792; 1814–1815; 1815–1830
- Country: Kingdom of France; Kingdom of France (1791–1792); Bourbon Restoration (1815–1830)
- Type: Army
- Colours
- Engagements: Franco-Spanish War; War of Devolution; Franco-Dutch War; War of the Reunions; Nine Years' War; War of the Spanish Succession; War of the Polish Succession; War of the Austrian Succession; Seven Years' War; American Revolutionary War; French Revolutionary Wars; French invasion of Spain

Commanders
- Commander-in-chief: Constable (1043–1626); Marshal General (de facto; 1626–1830)
- Notable commanders: Louis XIV; Turenne; The Great Condé; Luxembourg; Vauban; Villars; Vendôme; Maurice de Saxe; Berwick; Nicolas Catinat; Montcalm; Lévis; Lafayette; Rochambeau; Aiguillon; Rochejaquelein; Jean-de-Dieu Soult; Nicolas Oudinot

Insignia
- Uniform: Gray-white/white for regular infantry Blue for royal or guards infantry Red for Swiss and Irish mercenaries Blue for all units after 1814

The French Royal Army (French: Armée Royale Française) was the principal land force of the Kingdom of France. It served the Bourbon dynasty from the reign of Louis XIV in the mid-17th century to that of Charles X in the 19th, with an interlude from 1792 to 1814 and another during the Hundred Days in 1815. It was permanently dissolved following the July Revolution in 1830. The French Royal Army became a model for the new regimental system that was to be imitated throughout Europe from the mid-17th century onward. It was regarded as Europe's greatest military force for much of its existence.

== Early history ==
The first permanent army of France, which was paid with regular wages instead of being supplied by feudal levies, was established in the early 15th century under Charles VII. It was formed due to the need for reliable troops during the Hundred Years' War, though the Army was not disbanded because it saw continued use by the Kings of France following the conflict. Upon the outbreak of a conflict, an ordonnance would be issued to govern the length of service, composition and payment of units.

The Compagnies d'ordonnance formed the core of the Gendarme well into the 16th century, and were stationed throughout France and summoned into larger armies as needed. There was also provisions made for francs-archers, which was a militia of bowmen and foot soldiers raised from the non-noble classes, but the units were disbanded once war ended.

Meanwhile, the bulk of infantry was still provided by urban or provincial militias, which were raised from an area or city to fight locally and that were named for their recruiting grounds. Gradually, the units became more permanent, and in the late 15th century, Swiss instructors were recruited, and some of the 'Bandes' (Militia) were combined to form temporary 'Legions' of up to 9000 men. The men would be paid, contracted to fight and receive military training.

Henry II further regularised the French Army by forming standing infantry regiments to replace the Militia structure. The first of them (regiments Picardie, Piedmont, Navarre and Champagne) were called Les vieux corps (The Old Corps). It was normal policy to disband regiments after a war was over as a cost-saving measure with the vieux corps and the French Royal Guard being the only survivors. Regiments could be raised directly by the King and so be called after the region in which they were raised or by the nobility and so called after the noble or his appointed colonel. When Louis XIII came to the throne, he disbanded most of the regiments in existence, leaving only the Vieux and a handful of others, which became known as the Petite Vieux and also gained the privilege of not being disbanded after a war.

== Army of Louis XIV ==
Louis XIV

=== Creation of a professional royal army ===
When Louis XIV came to the French throne in 1661 he inherited a large but loosely organized force of about 70,000 men. Like the other European armies of the period, it consisted of a mixture of mercenaries, guard units, local militias and levies conscripted only for specific campaigns and then disbanded. Organization, cohesion, training and equipment were not of the highest standard.

Under Louis' two Secretaries of War Michel Le Tellier and his son the Marquis de Louvois, the French Royal Army was restructured into a highly disciplined and professional force made up of permanent regiments under central control. Weapons, promotion, drill, uniforms and organisation were improved or introduced and the army nearly doubled in size.

=== Military history of the reign ===
When Louis' father, Louis XIII, died, Anne of Austria, the queen, became regent. She and her chief minister, Cardinal Mazarin, ordered the arrest of legislative opponents, causing the enmity of many nobles and common citizens. When the bloody Thirty Years' War, in which France had sided with Protestant-governed countries against other Catholic nations in Europe, concluded, the Fronde civil war broke out and Mazarin was forced to flee.

When Louis XIV came of age in 1652, the Fronde ended and Mazarin was permitted to return and appointed chief minister for a second time. The leader of the anti-Mazarin faction, the Prince de Condé, escaped to Spain, which soon, with the Royalists of the British Isles, went to war against France and its new ally, Oliver Cromwell's Commonwealth of England. Under the command of Marshal Turenne, the Anglo-French army decisively defeated the Spanish in Flanders, part of which was a province of Spain.

In 1660, Louis married the Spanish princess Marie-Thérèse. In 1667 he claimed the Spanish Netherlands as her dowry, starting another conflict with Spain known as the War of Devolution. Turenne and Conde, who had been pardoned and allowed to return to France, commanded the French army. Their forces seized much of the Spanish Netherlands but, pressured by the Triple Alliance, Louis returned much of the French conquests in the Treaty of Aix-la-Chapelle, with the exception of eleven towns and their surrounding areas. Lille, Armentières, Bergues and Douai were considered essential to reinforce France's vulnerable northern border and remain French to this day. The retention of Tournai, Oudenarde, Courtrai, Veurne, Binche, Charleroi and Ath made future offensives much easier, as demonstrated in 1672.

From 1672 until 1678, France was embroiled in the Franco-Dutch War, with England and its Royal Navy as an ally (from 1672 to 1674). The war began in May 1672 when France invaded the Netherlands and nearly overran it, an event still referred to as het Rampjaar or 'Disaster Year'. By late July, the Dutch position had stabilised, with support from Emperor Leopold, Brandenburg-Prussia and Spain; this was formalised in the August 1673 Treaty of the Hague which Denmark joined in January 1674. But following English defeat and withdrawal, the French armies from 1674 to 1678, with Sweden as their only effective ally, managed to advance steadily in the southern (Spanish) Netherlands and along the Rhine, defeating the badly coordinated forces of the Grand Alliance with regularity. Eventually the heavy financial burdens of the war, along with the imminent prospect of England's reentry into the conflict on the side of the Dutch and their allies, convinced Louis to make peace despite his advantageous military position. The resulting Peace of Nijmegen between France and the Grand Alliance left the Dutch Republic intact and France generously aggrandized in the Spanish Netherlands.

The famed engineer Sébastien Le Prestre de Vauban designed his intricate fortifications during Louis XIV's reign. Vauban, a genius at siege warfare, oversaw the building or improvement of many fortresses in Flanders and elsewhere.

In 1688, the Catholic King of England, James II, was overthrown and William of Orange, the Dutch Stadtholder and old enemy of Louis, was installed as the next king. James fled to France, which he used as his base for an invasion of Ireland in 1690. As a result of James' ouster and, more directly, a French invasion of the Electoral Palatinate, the Nine Years' War broke out in 1689 and pitted France against the League of Augsburg and other European states.

The war ended with no major territorial gains or losses for either side, and the two alliances were at war again by 1701. Despite initial French successes at Friedlingen and Hochstadt, the allied armies under the Duke of Marlborough and Prince Eugene of Savoy inflicted major defeats on French troops at Blenheim, Ramillies, and Oudenarde. In Spain (the succession to that nation's throne was the war's cause), Spanish forces allied to the French lost Gibraltar. However, the heavy casualties suffered at Malplaquet in 1709 provided an opening for Marlborough's political opponents and after their victory in the 1710 British general election, he was removed from command and Britain sought to end the war. France's fortune returned under the leadership of Marshal Villars and Marshal Vendôme but despite a major victory at Denain in 1712, the war had turned into a stalemate and ended in peace that somewhat favored the French in 1714.

== Louis XV's reign ==
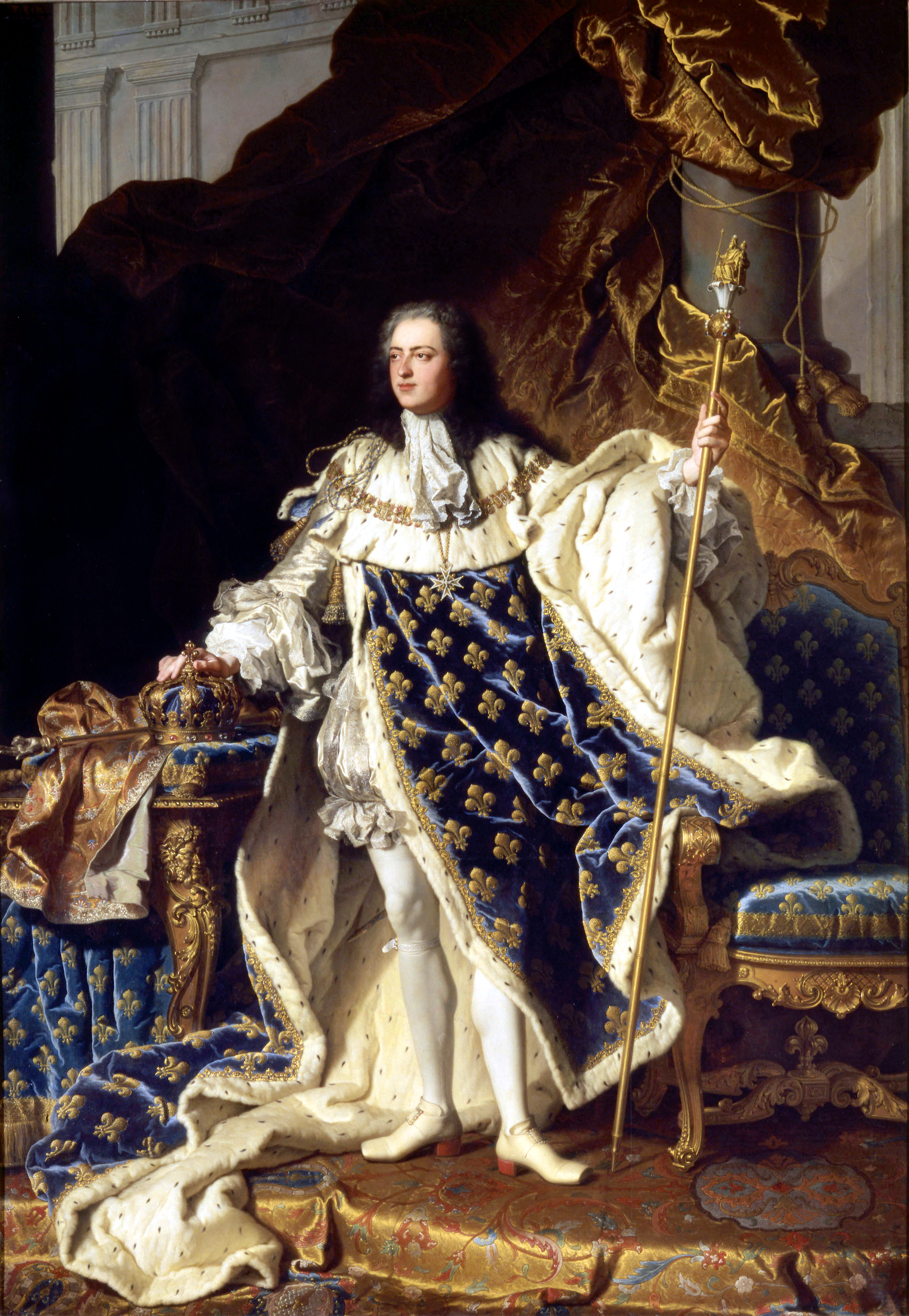
Louis XV

Louis XV, the great-grandson of Louis XIV, was the only direct heir alive when the elderly king died in 1715. His reign was much more peaceful than his great-grandfather's, although three major wars occurred. First was the War of the Polish Succession of 1733. The second, the War of the Austrian Succession, began when Maria Theresa inherited the Habsburg monarchy in 1740. Her father Charles VI, Holy Roman Emperor had appointed her as his heir, and other European countries agreed to respect his wishes. However, the new Prussian king, Frederick II, ignored the agreement, known as the Pragmatic Sanction, and annexed Habsburg Silesia.

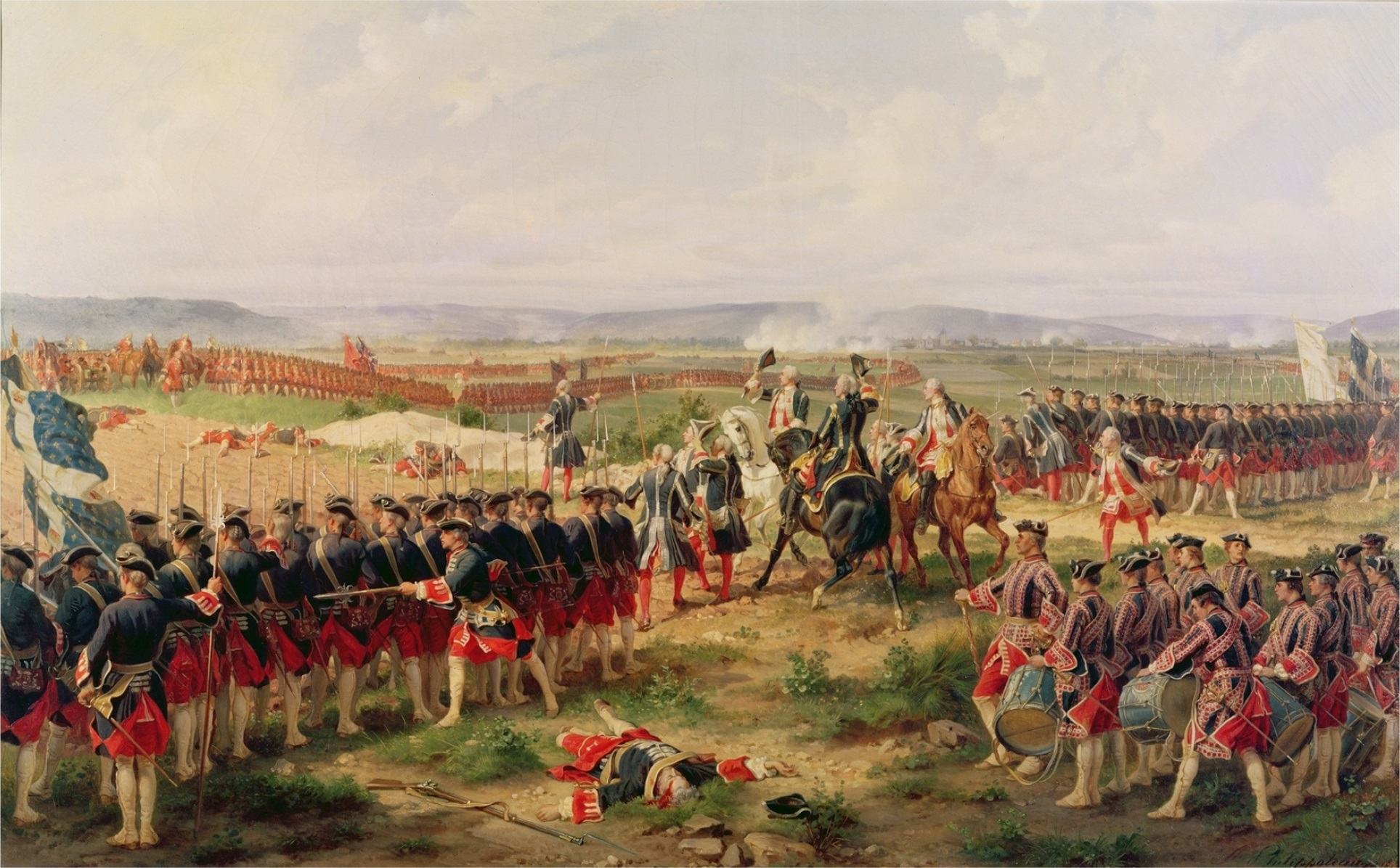
The French and allied armies confronting each other at Fontenoy. The blue-clad French troops in the foreground are members of the French Guards.

Britain allied itself with Maria Theresa, while Louis XV forged an alliance with Frederick. Louis provided military support in the form of detachments from France's Irish Brigade, in support of Charles Edward Stuart during the Jacobite rising of 1745. The Pragmatic Allies initially defeated the French in the Battle of Dettingen in 1743 but the battle had little effect on the wider war and has been described as "a happy escape, rather than a great victory". A series of French victories (including Marshal de Saxe's great triumph at Fontenoy in 1745) made the French conquest of much of the Austrian Netherlands possible; however, this territory was returned to Austria at the end of the war.

The situation after the war was almost the same as before, but it set the stage for the Seven Years' War, which officially began in 1756, when Prussia and Austria again went to war. This time, however, France and Austria were allied and Britain and Prussia formed an alliance. French forces were defeated at the Battle of Rossbach in 1757. At the same time as the fighting in Europe, raiding parties composed of French-Canadian militiamen and Indians attacked English settlements in North America. This war, known as the French and Indian War, was the last of four wars that occurred in North America at the same time as a European conflict. However, by 1759, the British had gone onto the offensive in America and captured Quebec, the French colonial capital.

Fighting also occurred on the Indian subcontinent during Louis XV's reign. During the War of the Austrian Succession, French troops captured several settlements in India, but its allies were defeated by British troops in 1756. On the whole, the Seven Years' War went badly for the French, who were forced to sign an unfavorable treaty in 1763.

== Collapse of the royal army ==
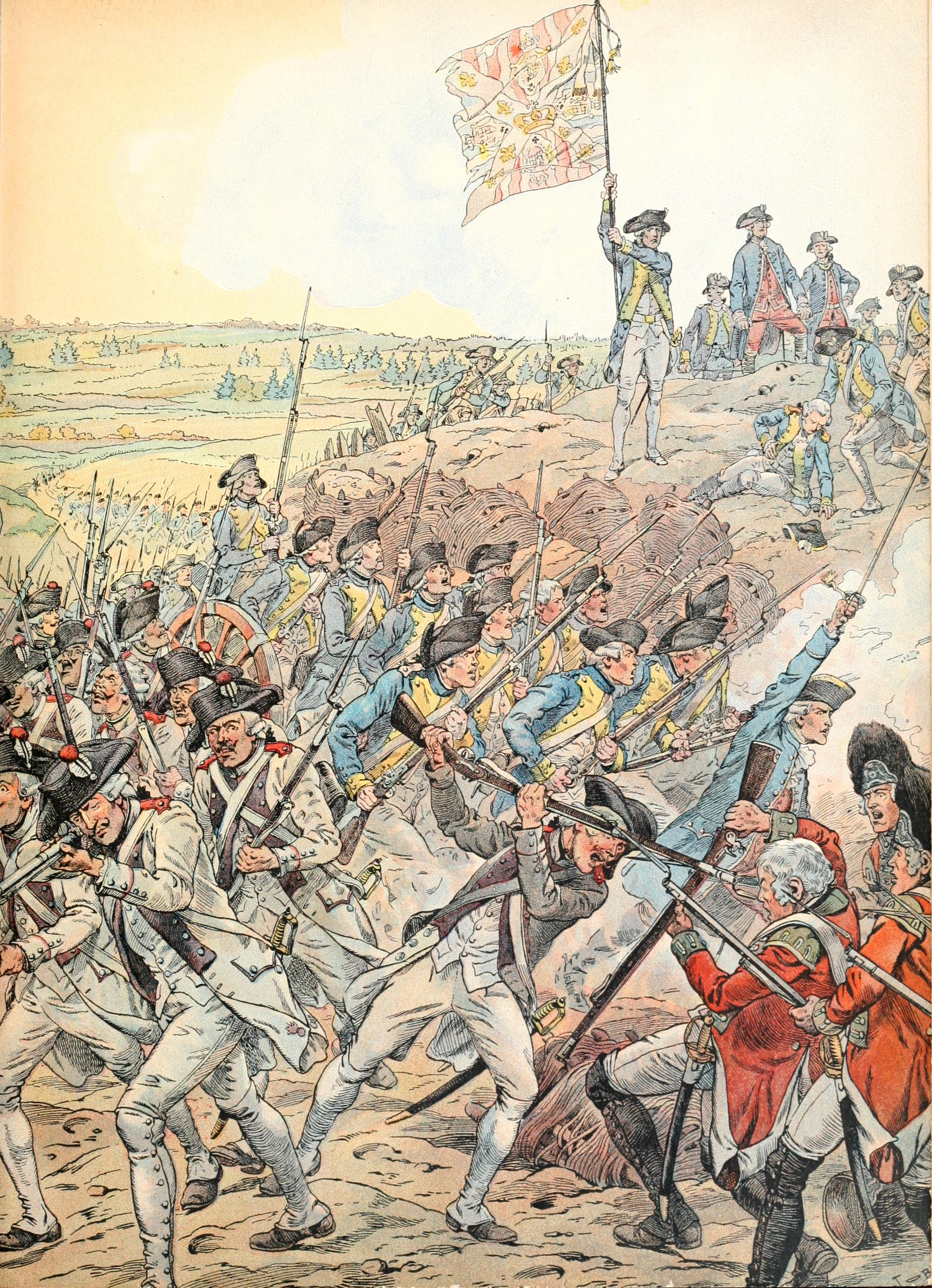
French troops storming Redoubt #9 during the Siege of Yorktown

When Britain's North American colonies rebelled in 1775, France initially offered limited support. However, after the American victory in the Battle of Saratoga, Louis XVI authorized an expeditionary force under the comte de Rochambeau to sail to America and aid the revolutionaries. The expeditionary force participated in the Siege of Yorktown in 1781, which resulted in the colonies' independence. In 1784, Jean-François Coste was appointed Chief Consulting Physician of the Camps and Armies of the King.

By the 1780s, the political balance in France had shifted. The aristocracy had become despised by many lower-and-middle-class citizens who faced famine in the winter of 1788/89 and had almost no political freedom. At an earlier stage in his reign Louis had succumbed to pressure from the nobility and banned promotion to officer status from the lower ranks of the Royal Army. This measure served to embitter long serving non-commissioned officers who could no longer aspire to reach commissioned rank, although the demands of regimental discipline and training still fell heavily upon them. Some of the now almost entirely aristocratic officer corps were still dedicated professionals but many neglected their responsibilities, preferring to spend excessive periods of leave as courtiers at Versailles or on their country estates.

Many French soldiers sympathised with the masses from which they were drawn, and increasing numbers deserted in 1789. The bulk of the rank and file of the Gardes Françaises: the largest regiment of the maison militaire du roi de France and the permanent garrison of Paris, refused to obey their officers at a crucial point in the early stages of the Revolution. Some Gardes joined with the Parisian mob on 14 July 1789 and participated in the storming of the Bastille, the medieval fortress-prison thought of as a symbol of governmental repression.

King Louis' powers were regulated by the National Assembly, which also authorized the creation of the National Guard, which was intended to be used as a counterweight to the royal army. The regular army was weakened by the flight of many aristocratic officers. Faced with the creation of soldiers' clubs (Jacobin committees), erosion of discipline, loss of their privileges as nobles and political mistrust, perhaps two thirds of the commissioned ranks emigrated after June 1791. They were largely replaced by experienced non-commissioned officers. In July 1791, twelve foreign regiments of mostly German mercenaries were amalgamated into the line, followed by the disbanding of the Swiss regiments a year later.

Major reorganizations of the army took place in 1791 and 1792. New officers were elected and the structure of the army was changed. Battalions of volunteers were authorized and subsequently merged with surviving units of the former royal army, to form amalgamated demi-brigades. This force underwent its first test during the Battle of Valmy in 1792, when an Austro-Prussian army invaded to restore the King's full powers. By now, the army was considered to be loyal to the First Republic, not to the king. From then until 1804, the army was known as the French Revolutionary Army, and from 1804 to 1814, the Imperial Army, and during the Hundred Days in 1815, was reconstituted before being officially disbanded.

== First Bourbon restoration ==
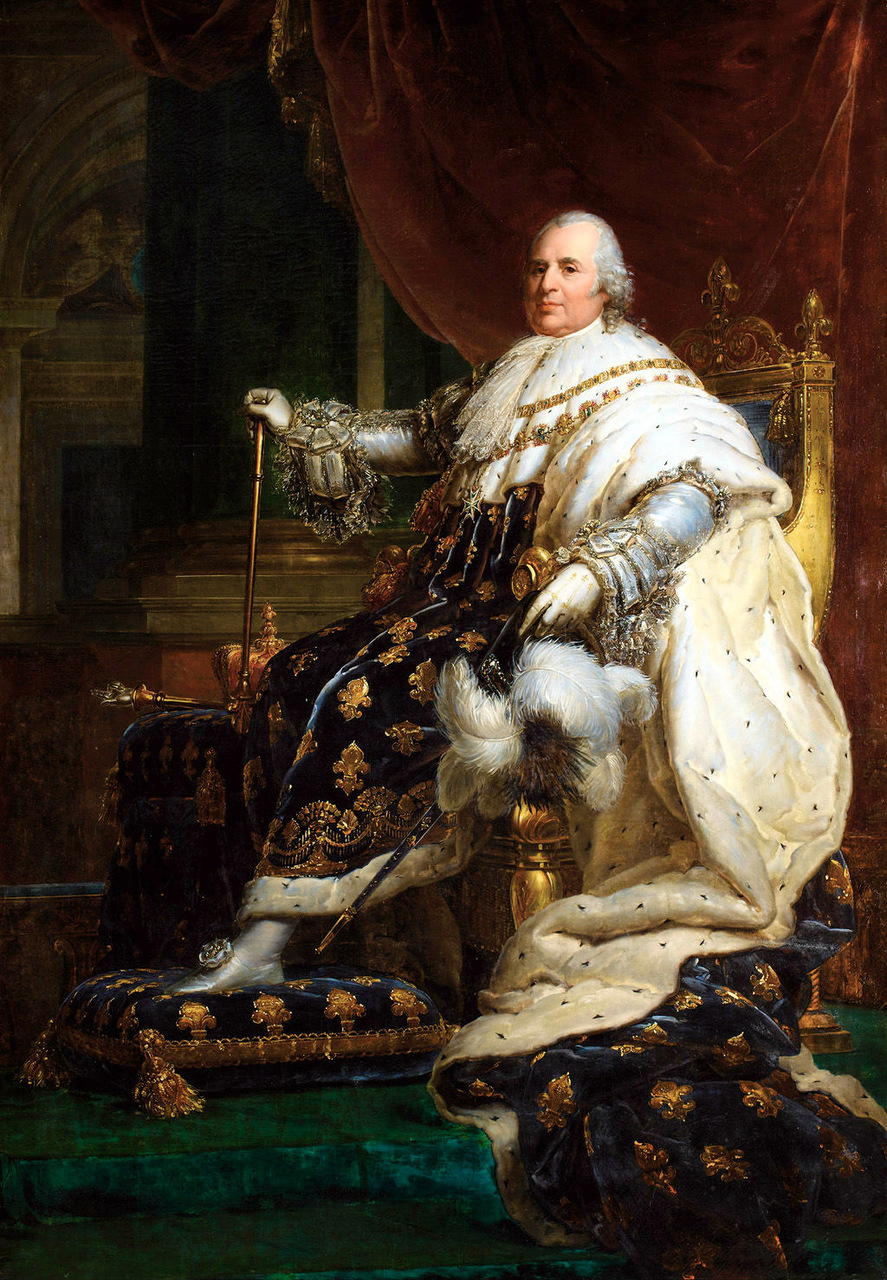
Portrait of Louis XVIII by François Gérard, 1814

Louis XVI was guillotined in 1793. By 1800, the First Republic, at war with much of Europe, had adopted a weak form of government that was overthrown by General Napoleon Bonaparte, who later proclaimed himself Emperor of the French. When Austrian, British, Prussian, and Russian armies invaded France in 1814, Napoleon was forced to abdicate. Louis XVI's brother, the Count of Provence, was declared King Louis XVIII. Under Louis XVIII, no major changes were made to the army, beyond the recreation of several regiments of the pre-revolutionary maison militaire du roi. However, when Napoleon returned from exile in 1815, the army, for the most part, went over to his side, and Louis fled.

== Second Bourbon restoration and July Revolution ==
Napoleon was defeated by a combined Allied army in 1815 at Waterloo, and Louis XVIII was returned to the throne. Realizing that the remains of the existing army had no loyalty to the restored monarchy, the government of Louis XVIII undertook a wholesale disbandment of what had been Napoleon's regiments. In their place a system of Departmental Legions was created with no historic connections to empire, republic or even the pre-1792 monarchy. His government appointed many aristocratic officers to the new army, which lost much of its morale, much as it had in 1789. In 1823, a French expeditionary force, the Hundred Thousand Sons of Saint Louis, aided Spanish troops loyal to the Bourbon King Ferdinand VII when his regime was threatened by an uprising.

In 1830, King Charles X, was forced to abdicate in the July Revolution. The army participated in little fighting, and the king's cousin, the Duke of Orléans, was installed as Louis Philippe I in what was supposed to be a constitutional monarchy. The army transferred its allegiance to Louis Philippe's House of Orléans until his overthrow in 1848, when the short-lived Second Republic was established.

== Organisation ==
=== The military household ===
The military household of the king of France, was the military part of the French royal household or Maison du Roi. The term only appeared in 1671, though such a gathering of military units pre-dates this. Two large foot regiments of the military household participated in the campaigns of the army; the French Guards Regiment and the Swiss Guards. Another well known unit was the Musketeers of the Guard.

=== French regiments ===
Foot

There were 90 French line infantry regiments in 1690. The companies were not distributed equally between the regiments; the weakest, the Périgueux, had only 15 companies, while the Picardie had 210. The regimental staff included a colonel and a lieutenant colonel both of which also nominally commanded a company, and a major without company. A field company had a captain, a lieutenant, a sub-lieutenant (or ensign in the colonel's company), two sergeants, three corporals, five lance-corporals, 39 private soldiers and a drummer. A garrison company had a captain, a lieutenant, two sergeants, a corporal, two lance-corporals, 44 privates and a drummer. A colonel's company in garrison had an additional ensign, while a grenadier company in garrison had an additional sub-lieutenant. The tactical formation was the field battalion of 16 companies with an authorized strength of 800 men. A garrison battalion had a varied number of companies, mostly from different regiments and was commanded by the senior company commander.

The French line infantry contained 69 regiments in 1767. The regiments had territorial or otherwise permanent titles. The nineteenth most senior regiments had four battalions, most regiments had two battalions while the junior regiments had one battalion. Each battalion had nine companies, eight of fusiliers and one of grenadiers. The regimental staff included a colonel and a lieutenant-colonel with companies and a major without. Each company had a captain, a lieutenant and a sub-lieutenant and contained four sergeants, one fourier, eight corporals, eight lance-corporals, 40 fusiliers and two drummers.

In 1767 the French army also had five mixed legions of light troops. Each legion had eight dragoon companies, eight fusilier companies and a grenadier company.

Horse

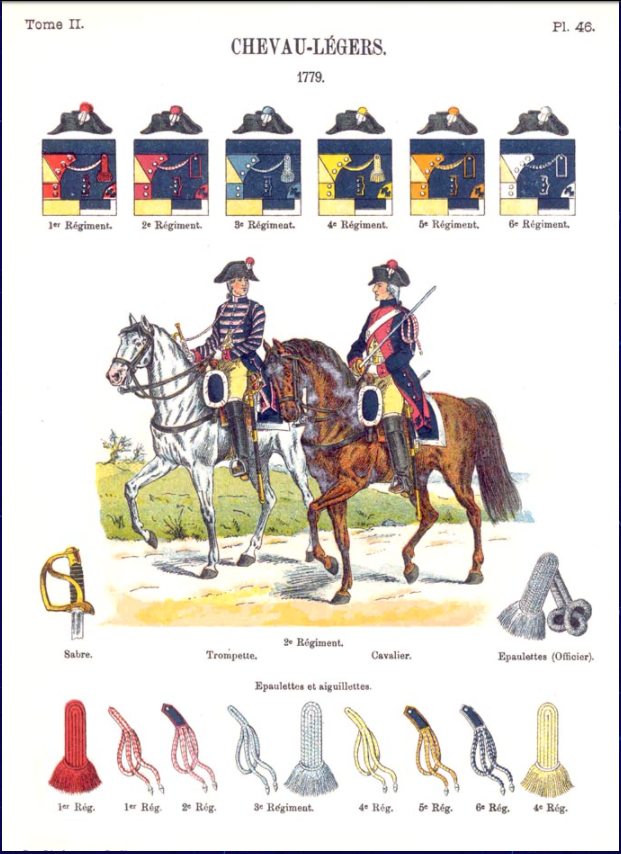
Uniforms of the 6 new light cavalry regiments following the 1779 ordnance

In 1690 there were 112 cavalry regiments, including 105 French and seven foreign. There were also 43 independent companies of horse. 27 regiments had two squadrons and eight companies, and 85 regiments had three squadrons and 12 companies. The regimental staff included a mestre de camp and a lieutenant-colonel with company and a major without a company. Each company had a captain, a lieutenant, a cornet, a quartermaster, two brigadiers, two carabineers and 35 troopers. In addition each regiment had a company of carabineers outside the squadrons, filling the same elite role as the grenadier company of a foot regiment.

In 1767 the cavalry contained 35 regiments. One of these was a carabineer regiment and four were hussars. All regiments were known by their titles; not by the name of their commanders. Each regiment had four squadrons; each squadron divided into two troops. The regimental staff included a mestre de camp and a lieutenant-colonel, both of which had troops, and a major without a troop. Each troop had a captain, a lieutenant and a sub-lieutenant, as well as four quartermasters, one fourier, eight brigadiers, eight carabineers, 31 troopers and a trumpeter. The carabineer regiment had a different organization.

Dragoons

In 1690 the dragoons contained 33 regiments, of which two were foreign, as well as 50 independent dragoon companies. Each regiment had three squadrons; each squadron had four companies . The regimental staff included a colonel and a lieutenant-colonel with companies, and a major without company. Each company had a captain, a lieutenant, a cornet, a quartermaster, two brigadiers, 37 dragoons and a drummer.

There were 17 dragoon regiments in 1767. The seven oldest were known by their title; the others by the name of their commanders. Each regiment had four squadrons; each squadron had two troops. The regimental staff included a mestre de camp and a lieutenant-colonel with troops, and a major without a troop. Each troop had a captain, a lieutenant and a sub-lieutenant, as well as four quartermasters, one fourier, eight brigadiers, eight lancepessades (lance-corporals), 24 dragoons and a drummer. Of a troops 46 members, 16 served on foot.

Artillery

In 1690 the artillery consisted of a cadre of gunnery officers stationed at the fortresses. The organization was under the Grand Master of Artillery and contained two lieutenant-generals of artillery commanding the two most important territorial divisions and during the campaign season also the artillery of the French armies in Germany and Flanders respectively; twelve lieutenants of artillery (rank as colonels of infantry) commanding the other territorial divisions including the arsenals; a number of provincial commissaries (rank as lieutenant-colonels of infantry) commanding the fortress artillery, and during a campaign the artillery train and the siege batteries. Otherwise the gunnery cadre contained a number of ordinary commissaires (captains), extraordinary commissaries (lieutenants) and officier-pointeurs (sub-lieutenants).

At the disposal of the artillery stood in 1690, a fusilier regiment, a bombardier regiment, two companies of miners, three of galiots and two of boatmen on the Rhine. The King's Fusiliers contained 88 companies with 272 officers and 4,720 men. There were five battalions and twelve gunnery companies outside the battalions. The 1st and 2nd battalions each had two companies of artificers, one of grenadiers and twelve of fusiliers. The 3rd and 4th battalions had each a grenadier company and 15 fusilier companies. The 5th battalion had 14 fusilier companies. The King's Bombardiers served the mortars and other heavy siege artillery and formed one battalion containing two bombardier companies and 13 fusilier companies.

In 1767 the artillery formed the Royal Corps of Artillery which ranked as the 47th among the foot regiments of the line. It contained seven regiments. Each regiment had five battalions of four companies each, to a total of 20 companies; two of sappers, four of bombardiers and 14 of gunners. Outside the brigades there was a company of artificers in each regiment. The regimental staff included a colonel, a lieutenant-colonel and five chef de brigades (majors).

=== Foreign regiments ===
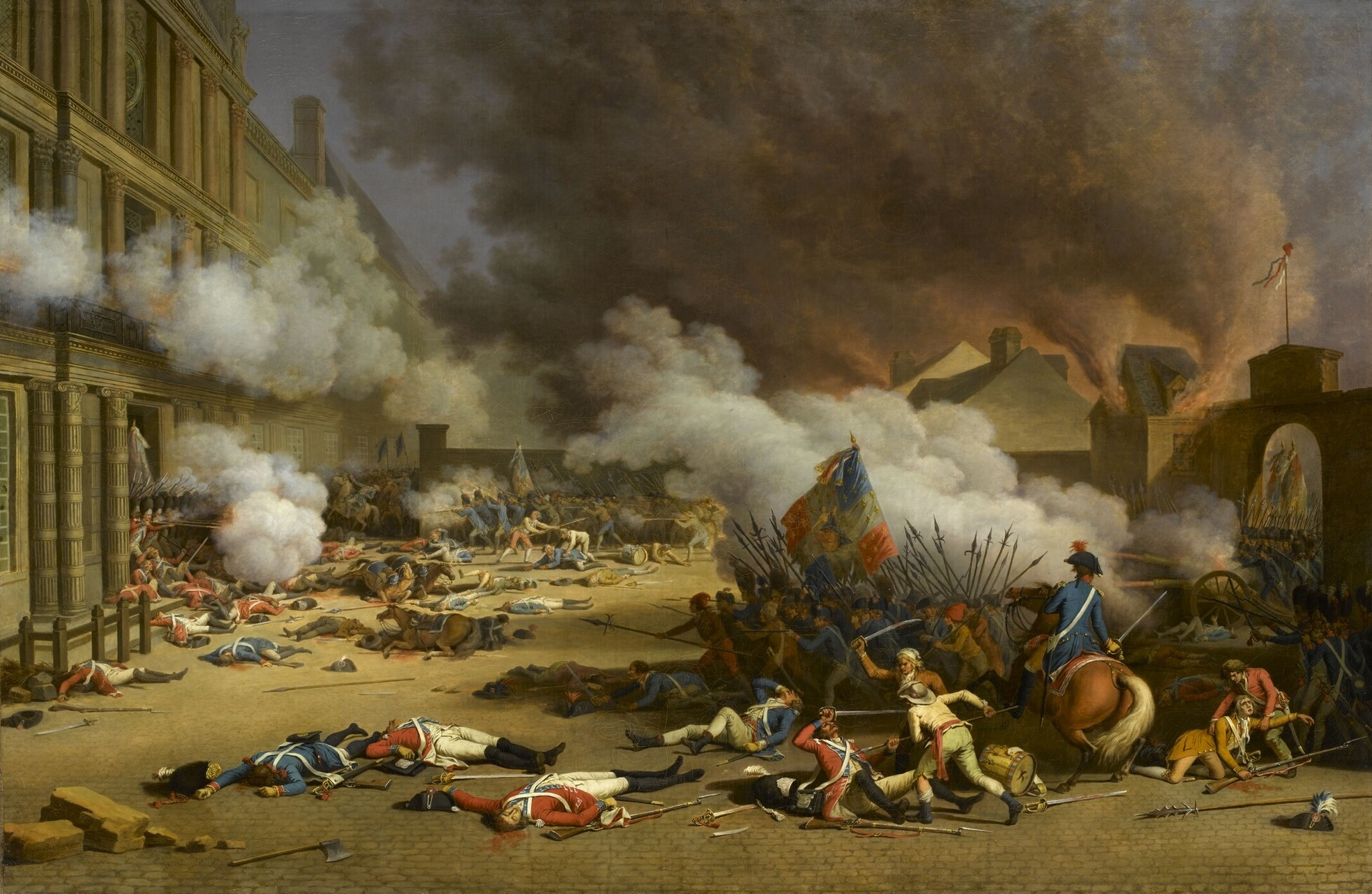
Massacre of the Swiss Guards, 1792

During the 17th and 18th centuries twelve regiments of Swiss mercenaries were employed in the French Royal Army, notably the Swiss Guards. During the 10 August riot of 1792, supporters of the French Revolution, including members of the radical-leaning National Guard marched on the Tuileries Palace. King Louis XVI escaped with his family, but, after fighting broke out in the palace courtyard, the Swiss Guards were massacred by the mob. Some Guards, including the commander, were captured, jailed, and later guillotined.

In 1690 there were ten Swiss line regiments in French service; six with 16 companies each in three field battalions and one garrison battalion, and four with twelve companies each in three field battalions. Royal-Roussillon was a Catalonian foreign regiment with 18 companies in two battalions. There were also six German foreign regiments, seven Italian foreign regiments, five Walloon foreign regiments and three Irish foreign regiments.

There were 23 foreign line regiments in 1767; eleven Swiss, seven German and five Irish. German regiments had permanent titles. The Swiss and Irish regiments were known by the name of their proprietary colonels. The Swiss and German regiments had two battalions, the Irish one.

== Strength ==
=== Authorized strength ===
Period	Peace Time	War Time
1445–1475	14,000	–
Wars at the end the 15th century	–	40,000
1490	17,000	–
Wars during 1540s, 1550s	–	70–80,000
1571	13,000	–
Wars of Religion 1589–1598	–	50–60,000
1610–1615	10,000	–
French participation in Thirty Years' War 1635–1648	–	200,000
1660–1666	72,000	–
War of Devolution, 1667–1668	–	134,000
Franco-Dutch War, 1672–1678	–	280,000
1678–1688	165,000	–
Nine Years' War, 1688–1697	–	420,000
1698–1700	140,000	–
War of the Spanish Succession, 1701–1714	–	380,000
War of the Austrian Succession, 1740–1748	–	390,000
1749–1756	160,000	–

=== Size of European armies ===
Population ~165 (millions)		Size of Army (thousands)		
State	Size	~1630	~1650	~1710
Kingdom of France	18	80	100	340–380
Kingdom of England	4.7	. .	70	87
Dutch Republic	1.5	70	30	120
Habsburg Monarchy	8	100	20–24	110-130
Crown of Castile; Crown of Aragon	7	300	100	50
Ottoman Empire	18	40**	50**	50**
Brandenburg-Prussia	0.5	12	8	40
Polish–Lithuanian Commonwealth	11	17	53	50
Polish–Lithuanian Commonwealth	11	17	53	100*
Tsardom of Russia	15	45	92	170
Denmark–Norway	1.3	30–40	35	53
Sweden	1.1	45	70	100
* All Polish forces, on both sides in the Great Northern War.			** Janissaries only.	

== Uniforms ==
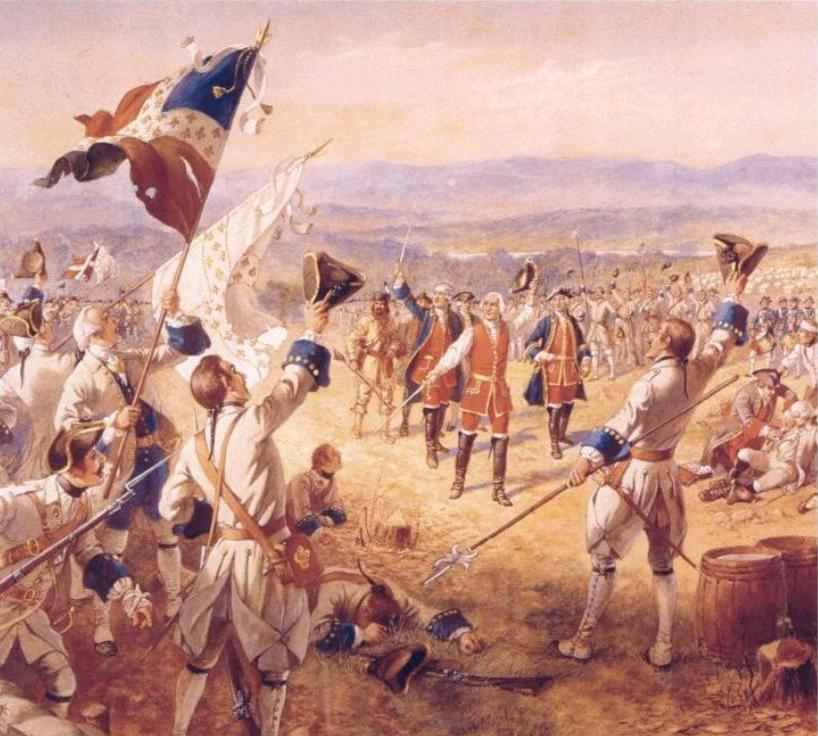
French troops at Carillon in 1758 in white uniforms

The guard regiments of the Maison du Roi adopted complete uniforms in the early 1660s as a substitute for the cassocks with civilian clothing worn previously. As an example the Garden Francais were reported as wearing grey and red uniforms with silver embroidery shortly after 1661. The line infantry adopted clothing in various regimental colours decided on by their colonels, in an extended process starting in the early 1660s but not completed until the late 1670s. Cavalry wore buff leather coats and breeches without specific uniform features until "grey cloth lined in the same colour" and dark blue for royal mounted units was ordered in November 1671.

During the 1680s there was a movement towards more standardised dress, although dragoons and foreign infantry still wore coats in a wide range of regimental colours The guards regiments wore blue, the regular infantry wore gray-white, and the Swiss mercenary regiments in French service wore red. In 1690, during the Nine Years' War, each regiment was given a uniform. Eighty-eight regiments wore gray uniforms with red facings, and fourteen princely regiments wore blue. The first regulations detailing specifics of uniforms is dated to 1704. Unusually, grenadiers for most of the part wore a tricorn like the fusiliers, rather than a mitre or a bearskin. Bearskins came into full use by about 1770.

During the 18th century a series of revised dress regulations made for repeated changes in the facing colours of individual infantry regiments. The Swiss and Irish mercenary regiments retained their red coats throughout this period, while other foreign units generally wore medium blue. Cavalry wore a variety of green, blue or red regimental uniforms, largely according to the whim of individual colonels. The regiments of the Royal Household were similarly variegated, although dark blue dominated. The change from the white or off-white uniforms, traditionally associated with the line infantry of the royal army, to dark blue was completed in 1793 after the overthrow of the monarchy. White uniforms were restored after the Bourbon Restoration, although modified for a more modern appearance, introducing trousers rather than breeches, taller shakos, and Fleur-de-lis insignia. Dark blue coatees were adopted in 1819.

== Weaponry ==
Pikes appeared in France at the beginning of the 16th century. They were used by the army until the end of the 17th century when the pike and shot tactics were abandoned. The matchlock musket (mousquet) was introduced in France after the battle of Pavia in 1525. The French army abandoned the musket in 1700 with the appearance of the flintlock musket (fusil). Different models of the Charleville musket, a .69 caliber standard French infantry musket was made from 1717 and into the 1840s.

The Vallière artillery system of 1732 standardized the artillery pieces. The Valliere guns proved good in siege warfare but were less satisfactory in a war of movement. In 1765 it was replaced by the Gribeauval system, which revolutionized the French artillery; improving its cannons, howitzers, and mortars, by making them lighter, without sacrificing range. The new guns contributed to French military victories even during the French Revolutionary Wars and Napoleonic Wars.

== Recruitment ==
The Royal Army during the Ancien regime was recruited through volunteer enlistment. Almost 90% of the recruits came from the peasantry and the working class, while about 10% came from the petite bourgeoisie. Privates were usually promoted directly to the rank of sergeant and bypassed the rank of corporal. At the time of the French Revolution, a third of the sergeants came from the petty bourgeoisie or higher classes.

Three career paths existed for officers; one privileged for the high nobility, one standard for the middle and lower nobility and the higher bourgeoisie and one exceptional for promoted sergeants. The high nobility quickly reached high rank, the mean age of promotion to colonel being 36 years. The standard career path was based on seniority and was rather inert; the mean age of promotion to captain was 45 years. Promoted sergeants could normally not reach higher than to substantive lieutenants and captains by brevet although their social background significantly deviated from the rank and file; over two thirds came from the petty bourgeoisie or higher classes. The different career paths created a lack of social homogeneity in the officer corps.

The military reforms after the Seven Years' War attempted to create a professionalized officer corps built on the petty nobility. However, the privileged career of the high nobility being retained caused the failure of the reforms. In consequence, many noblemen in the officer corps sided with the bourgeoisie in the struggle against the class prerogatives of the high nobility.

== Conflicts ==
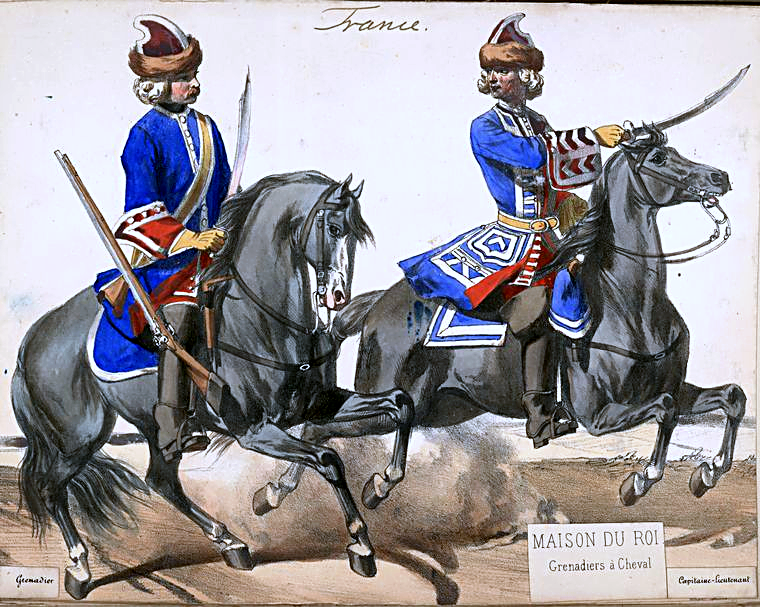
Mounted grenadiers of Louis XV during the War of the Polish Succession

- Franco-Spanish War (1652–1659)
- War of Devolution (1667–1668)
- Franco-Dutch War (1672–1678)
- War of the Reunions (1683–1684)
- Nine Years' War (1689–1697)
- War of the Spanish Succession (1701–1714)
- War of the Polish Succession (1733–1738)
- War of the Austrian Succession (1740–1748)
- Seven Years' War (1756–1763)
- American Revolutionary War (1779–1783)
- French Revolutionary Wars (1792)
- French invasion of Spain (1823)

== Notable battles ==
=== Franco-Spanish War ===
- Battle of Arras (1654)
- Battle of Valenciennes (1656)
- Battle of the Dunes (1658)

=== Franco-Dutch War ===
- Siege of Maastricht (1673)
- Battle of Seneffe (1674)
- Battle of Sinsheim (1674)
- Battle of Entzheim (1674)
- Battle of Mulhouse (1674)
- Battle of Turckheim (1675)
- Battle of Konzer Brücke (1675)
- Siege of Philippsburg (1676)
- Siege of Maastricht (1676)
- Siege of Valenciennes (1677)
- Siege of Cambrai (1677)
- Battle of Cassel (1677)
- Battle of Ortenbach (1678)
- Battle of Saint-Denis (1678)

=== Nine Years' War ===
- Siege of Philippsburg (1688)
- Battle of Walcourt (1689)
- Battle of Fleurus (1690)
- Battle of Staffarda (1690)
- Siege of Mons (1691)
- Siege of Cuneo (1691)
- Battle of Leuze (1691)
- Siege of Namur (1692)
- Battle of Steenkerque (1692)
- Battle of Landen (1693)
- Battle of Marsaglia (1693)
- Battle of Torroella (1694)
- Battle of Sant Esteve d'en Bas (1695)
- Siege of Namur (1695)
- Siege of Diksmuide (1695)
- Siege of Ath (1697)
- Siege of Barcelona (1697)

=== War of the Spanish Succession ===
- Battle of Chiari (1701)
- Battle of Luzzara (1702)
- Battle of Friedlingen (1702)
- Battle of Ekeren (1703)
- First Battle of Höchstädt (1703)
- Battle of Speyerbach (1703)
- Battle of Blenheim (1704)
- Battle of Elixheim (1705)
- Battle of Cassano (1705)
- Battle of Calcinato (1706)
- Battle of Ramillies (1706)
- Battle of Turin (1706)
- Battle of Castiglione (1706)
- Battle of Almansa (1707)
- Siege of Toulon (1707)
- Battle of Oudenarde (1708)
- Battle of Wijnendale (1708)
- Siege of Lille (1708)
- Battle of Malplaquet (1709)
- Battle of Saragossa (1710)
- Battle of Villaviciosa (1710)
- Battle of Brihuega (1710)
- Siege of Bouchain (1711)
- Battle of Denain (1712)
- Siege of Bouchain (1712)
- Rhine campaign (1713)
- Siege of Barcelona (1713–1714)

=== War of the Polish Succession ===
- Siege of Danzig (1734)
- Battle of Guastalla (1734)

=== War of the Austrian Succession ===
- Battle of Dettingen (1740)
- Battle of Fontenoy (1745)

=== Seven Years' War/French and Indian War ===
- Battle of the Monongahela (1756)
- Battle of Ticonderoga (1758)
- Battle of Saint-Cast (1758)
- Battle of Minden (1759)
- Battle of Quebec (1759)

=== Anglo-French War/American Revolutionary War ===
- Siege of Savannah (1779)
- Battle of Martinique (1780) – several regiments acting as marines aboard ships
- Siege of Yorktown (1781)
- Hudson Bay Expedition (1782)
- Battle of the Saintes (1782) – several regiments acting as marines aboard ships

=== French Revolution/French Revolutionary Wars ===
- Battle of Valmy (1792) during transition to Army of the First Republic

=== French invasion of Spain ===
- Battle of Trocadero (1823)

== Notable personnel ==
- Henri de La Tour d'Auvergne, vicomte de Turenne
- Louis II de Bourbon, Prince de Condé
- François Henri de Montmorency, Duke of Luxembourg
- Sébastien Vauban
- Claude de Villars
- Louis Joseph, Duke of Vendôme
- Maurice de Saxe
- Nicolas Catinat
- James FitzJames, 1st Duke of Berwick
- Jean-de-Dieu Soult
- Nicolas Oudinot
- Gilbert du Motier, Marquis de Lafayette
- Jean-Baptiste Donatien de Vimeur, comte de Rochambeau
- Camille d'Hostun, Duke of Tallard
- Victor-François de Broglie, Duke of Broglie
- Louis de Buade de Frontenac
- François de Neufville, Duke of Villeroi
- Louis Antoine, Duke of Angoulême
