= Siege of Cuneo (1691) =

1691 battle of the Nine Years' War

- Part of the Nine Years' War
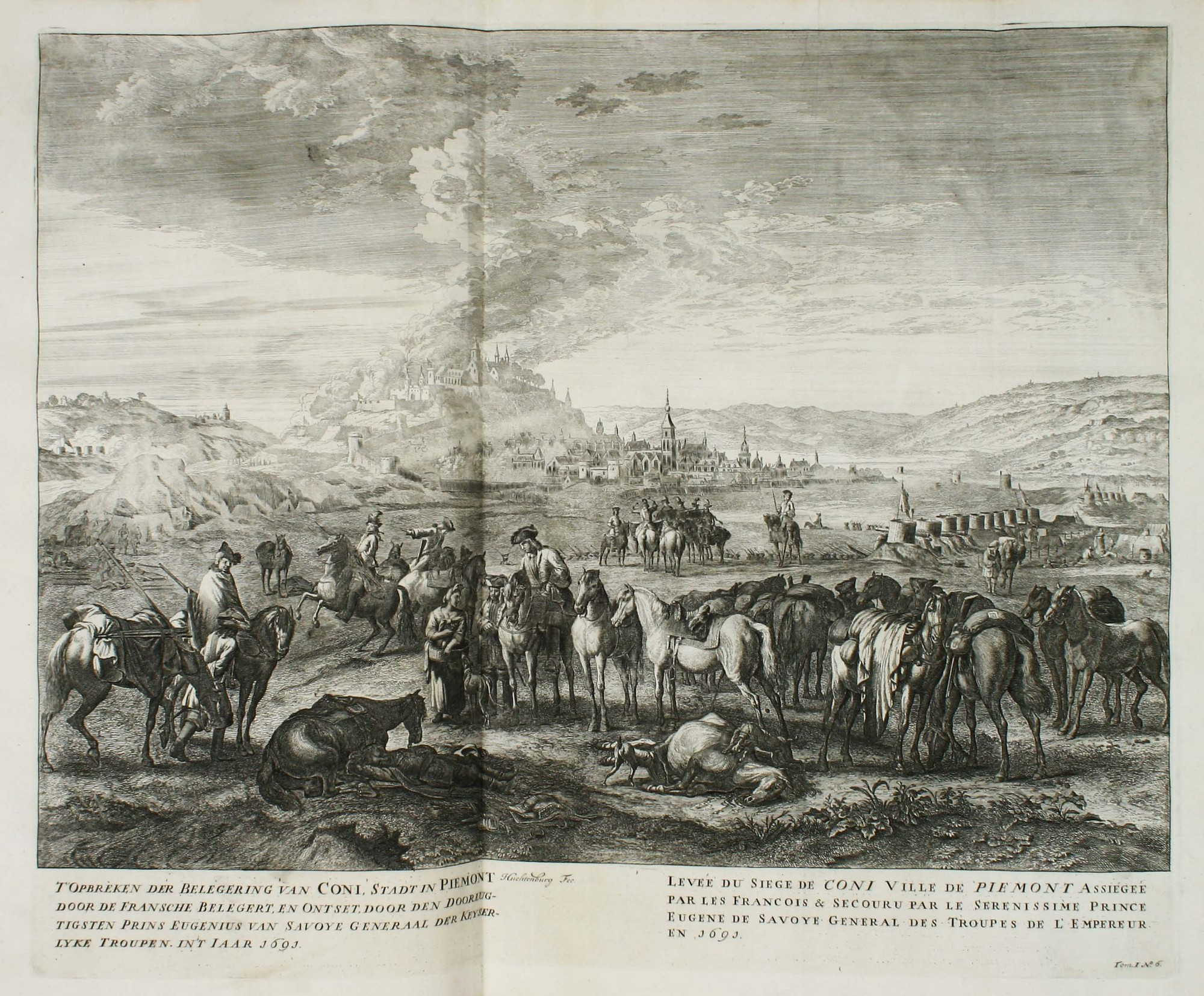
- Siege of Cuneo 1691
Date	28 June 1691
Location	Cuneo, Piedmont, (Present-day Italy); 44°23′22″N 7°32′52″E
Result	Grand Alliance victory

Belligerents
France	Duchy of Savoy; Relief force: Holy Roman Empire; Spain

Commanders and leaders
(Kingdom of France) Marquis de Feuquières (Kingdom of France) Vivien de Bulonde	(Duchy of Savoy) Victor Amadeus II of Savoy (Holy Roman Empire) Eugene of Savoy (Spanish Empire) Marquis of Leganés

Strength
Unknown	2,500 relief force

Casualties and losses
~700–800	Unknown

The siege of Cuneo was fought on 28 June 1691 during the Nine Years' War in Piedmont-Savoy, modern-day northern Italy. The siege was part of French King Louis XIV’s campaign against Victor Amadeus, the Duke of Savoy, who had sided with the Grand Alliance the previous year. The siege was an attempt to gain a foothold on the Piedmont Plain, thus ensuring Marshal Catinat's army could winter east of the Alps. Yet due to the incompetence of the two French commanders (in fact, General Vivien de Bulonde, because of decoded messages from Louis XIV to Catinat authorizing his punishment, has been proposed by some to have been the Man in the Iron Mask) – and a timely arrival of Imperial reinforcements – the siege proved a disaster, resulting in the loss of between 700 and 800 men. Although French forces had taken Nice in the west, and Montmélian in the north, Catinat's small, ill-equipped army was forced onto the defensive. Louis XIV subsequently offered Amadeus generous peace terms but the Duke, who had by now received substantial Imperial reinforcements from the Empire, considered himself strong enough to continue hostilities.

== Background ==
In an attempt to free himself from French vassalage Duke Victor Amadeus of Savoy had declared for the Grand Alliance in June 1690, but in the first campaign he had suffered a major defeat by Marshal Catinat at the Battle of Staffarda on 18 August. Utilising France's main base at Pinerolo Catinat subsequently captured several other towns in the region. However, due to communication problems and poor logistics (leading to shortages in supply and men), the French were obliged to withdraw from the Piedmont plain at the end of 1690, and move into winter quarters west of the Alps.

The French began the 1691 campaign early. In March Catinat crossed the border into the County of Nice to attack the southern coastal towns of Nice and Villefranche (it was imperative to take both positions because of their potential to act as a springboard for Allied land and amphibious attacks against Provence; conversely, their capture would facilitate French operations in southern Piedmont). Villefranche immediately capitulated to Catinat on 20 March; the town of Nice also quickly surrendered, but its citadel held out against a detachment under General Vins until 1 April. Nice was captured for the loss of just 100 men, and the whole county was now almost entirely under the control of Louis XIV. Of all the Savoyard towns west of the Alps only Montmélian, in the Duchy of Savoy, remained in the Duke's hands.

== Siege ==
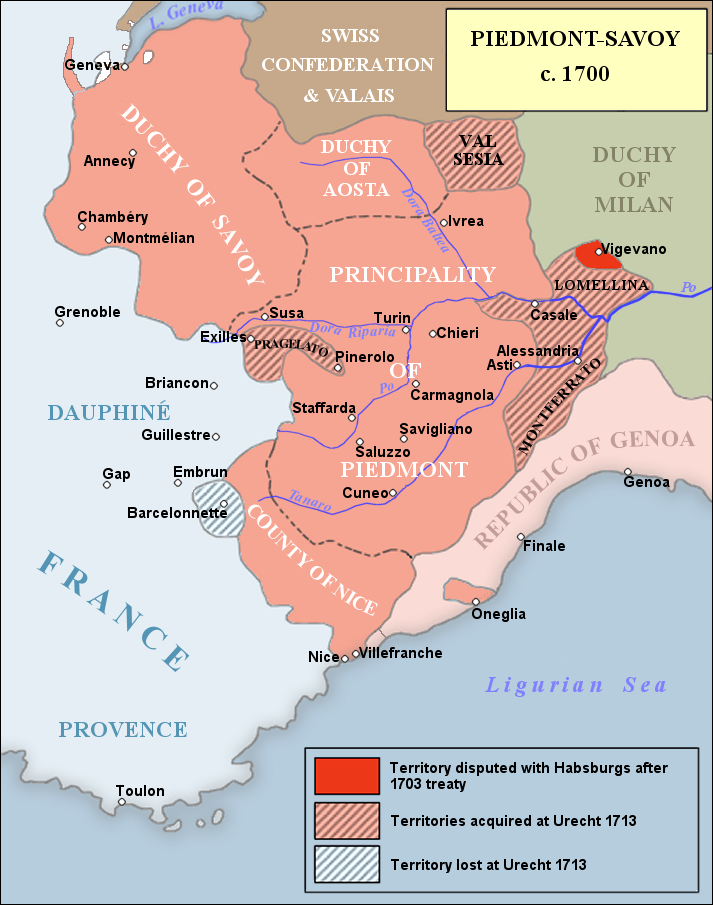
At the beginning of the Nine Years War, the territories of Victor Amadeus II, Duke of Savoy, primarily split into several distinct regions, notably: County of Nice, the Duchy of Savoy and the Principality of Piedmont, which contained the capital city of Turin.

In Piedmont the Marquis de Feuquières marched south-west out of Pinerolo on 18 April to attack the Vaudois and refugee French Huguenots in Luserna. Encountering little resistance Feuquières, who had suffered defeat at Luserna the previous year, sacked the town, killing many of its inhabitants. Catinat, meanwhile, ravaged the Turin–Susa route. Although the capture of Turin, Piedmont's capital, was not possible due to lack of infantry and supply, Catinat took Avigliana on 29 May, before sending a large corps under Feuquières and Bulonde to besiege Cuneo on the Stura in southern Piedmont.

Cuneo's capture would enable the French to spend the 1691–92 winter east of the Alps, but the incompetence of the two commanders turned the expedition into an unmitigated disaster. On hearing the approach of a relief force of Imperial cavalry under Prince Eugene of Savoy and Spanish troops led by the Marquis of Leganés, Bulonde lost his nerve and raised the siege. With the loss of between 700–800 troops the French army abandoned its supplies, its wounded, and its heavy guns, degenerating into a fleeing rabble as it tried to regain Catinat's main force near Turin. Cuneo's garrison had held out, and was still intact when Eugene arrived. Having reinforced the town Eugene returned to Turin.

== Aftermath ==
In July Feuquières managed to get reinforcements and cash to the main French stronghold of Casale, cut off on the far eastern border of Amadeus's territory (the only time this was achieved in the war). Nevertheless, French forces in the Italian theatre continued to be handicapped by supply and manning shortages. Earlier, on 9 June, Catinat had taken Carmagnola, but in August 13,000 Imperial troops – who had recently fought against the Ottomans in the War of the Holy League – arrived to reinforce Amadeus, raising his strength (on paper) to 45,000. On 26 September the Allies crossed the river Po to retake the lost town. Due to the lack of available French troops, Carmagnola capitulated to the Allies on 8 October.

Meanwhile, the Marquis de La Hoguette, commanding French forces in the Duchy of Savoy, raided the Aosta Valley in preparation for the siege of Montmélian. The valley was one of the two main routes into Savoy through which Amadeus could send assistance from Piedmont (the capture of Susa in November 1690 had blocked the only other direct route). Hoguette reached as far south as Bard before returning to Savoy, destroying behind him all the bridges and passing points. Due to a lack of siege guns Montmélian could not be properly invested until November. However, when it became apparent that no relief was coming from Piedmont, the town's governor finally yielded the citadel on 22 December.

Although the French had achieved little in Piedmont, Catinat now controlled almost all of the County of Nice and the Duchy of Savoy. At peace talks in mid-summer Louis XIV had insisted keeping his gains in Nice, several Piedmontese towns on the route to Casale, and Montmélian; some 2,400 of Amadeus's troops, together with three dragoon regiments were also expected to join with French forces against the Grand Alliance on other fronts. However, on 16 July, the King's highly influential and belligerent War Minister, Louvois, died; 12 days later Louis XIV recalled the more moderate Pomponne to sit in the Conseil d'en haut, the consequences of which were to alter the political direction of the state. Now facing a superior enemy, and unable to sustain their forces on the Piedmontese plain, Louis XIV offered further peace terms in December, but these provisions bore no resemblance to the original demands at the beginning of the war in Italy in May 1690. Louis XIV was now prepared to indemnify Savoy for the costs of the war, and the places France had conquered would be sequestrated in neutral hands; Casale would be razed, and, in the event of the death of Charles II, King of Spain, Louis XIV would help Amadeus to conquer the Milanese. By now, however, Amadeus was not prepared to negotiate seriously, especially as he anticipated military superiority for the following campaign. The peace terms were rejected and hostilities resumed the following year.

== Sources ==
- Lynn, John A (1999). The Wars of Louis XIV: 1667–1714. Longman. ISBN 0-582-05629-2
- MacMunn, George (1933). Prince Eugene: Twin Marshal with Marlborough. Sampson Low, Marston & CO., Ltd.
- Maffi, Davide (2010). La cittadella in armi. Esercito, società e finanza nella Lombardia di Carlo II 1660-1700. Milan: FrancoAngeli, 2010. ISBN 8856821141
- Rowlands, Guy (2000). "Louis XIV, Vittorio Amedeo II and French Military Failure in Italy, 1689–96". The English Historical Review. 115 (462): 534–69. doi:10.1093/ehr/115.462.534. JSTOR 579666.
- Wolf, John B. (1970). Louis XIV. Panther Books. ISBN 0-586-03332-7
