= Jean-François Coste =

Jean-François Coste may refer to:

- Jean-François Coste (physician) (1741–1819), chief physician of the French expeditionary forces in the American Revolution
- Jean-François Coste (sailor) (died 2026), French sailor
