= Battle of Chiari =

1701 battle in Italy

- Part of the War of the Spanish Succession
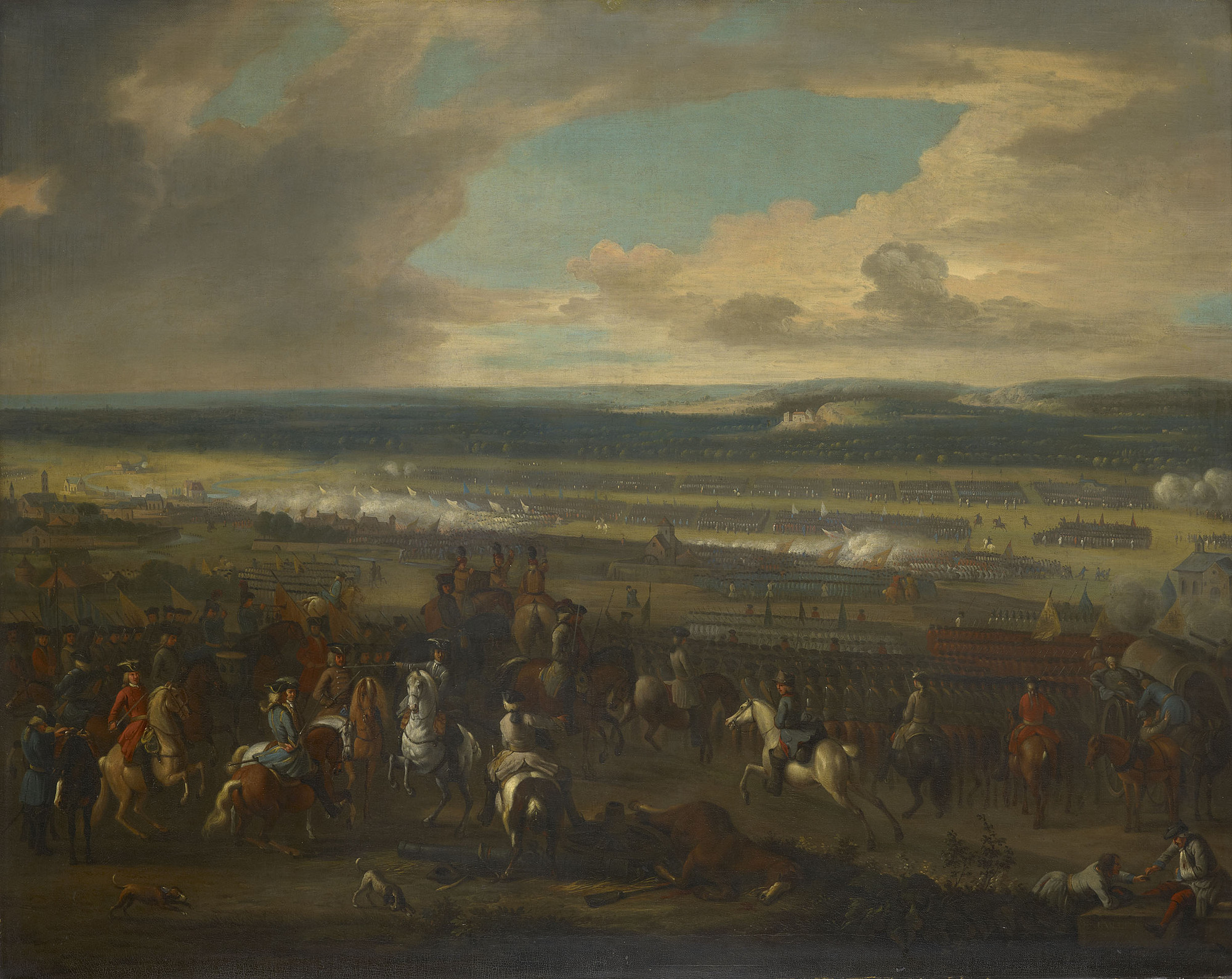
- Battle of Chiari, Jan van Huchtenburg
Date	1 September 1701
Location	Chiari, Lombardy, Italy 45°32′N 9°56′E
Result	Austrian victory

Belligerents
Austria	France; Spain; Savoy

Commanders and leaders
Eugene of Savoy Guido Starhemberg	Duke of Villeroi Nicolas Catinat Savoy Victor Amadeus II

Strength
22,000	38,000

Casualties and losses
200–300 killed and wounded (Note: De Vryer doubted the low figures for the Imperial army: "It is not easy to determine what losses both armies suffered in this battle, as these details are usually reduced or increased according to the authors' affiliations; although it is said that some time after this [battle] a messenger from the Bourbon army fell into the hands of the Emperor's troops, with whom a list was found in which their loss was estimated at 86 killed and 302 wounded, both high and low ranking commanders, apart from between 3000 and 4000 so killed and wounded soldiers. But, if this is true, there is no reason to believe the story of some who say that on the Emperor's side there were no more than 30 killed and 81 wounded; For although it is clear from the account of the battle that the loss must have been greater on the French side than on the German side, there is no proportionality between these two numbers, and especially not when one considers that the loss and the regaining of the posts at Chiari could not take place without a great loss of people; therefore those who bring the loss of the Prince of Savoy to 300 both killed and wounded deserve more credence, although that number still seems too low.") (Note: Henderson states 107, (36 dead, 81 wounded).)	2,000–3,800 killed and wounded

The Battle of Chiari was fought on 1 September 1701 during the War of the Spanish Succession. The engagement was part of Prince Eugene of Savoy's campaign to seize the Spanish controlled Duchy of Milan in the Italian peninsula, and had followed his victory over Marshal Catinat at the Battle of Carpi in July. Marshal Villeroi replaced Catinat as commander of the Franco–Spanish–Savoyard forces in the theatre, carrying with him orders from King Louis XIV to push the Imperialists out of Italy.

Foreseeing Villeroi's intention of attacking at any price, Eugene entrenched himself in front of the small fortress of Chiari, and waited for the attack. In a battle that lasted several hours the Austrians inflicted heavy casualties on Villeroi's forces, gaining an overwhelming victory. The victory in the campaign established Eugene in Lombardy, and helped to persuade the Maritime Powers to come to the aid of the Emperor. Within a week of the battle England, the Dutch Republic, and Leopold I had signed the second treaty of the Grand Alliance.

== Prelude ==
After his defeat at the Battle of Carpi on 9 July 1701 the French commander, Nicolas Catinat, precipitously retired behind the river Mincio, leaving Prince Eugene in command of the whole country between that river and the Adige. Eugene now effected the passage of the Mincio at Peschiera del Garda, driving the French farther back across the Oglio. (See map).

The failure of Catinat to withstand the advance of a much smaller Imperial army evoked indignation at Versailles, leading King Louis XIV to replace Catinat with the ageing duc de Villeroi. Villeroi – with orders to risk a battle – arrived in theatre in late August. Louis XIV needed a victory to assure the continued loyalty of Italy to his grandson's regime. On 7 September, not knowing the battle had already been fought, the French King wrote to his commander, "I cannot tell you how pleased I am to have you in command … I have reason to believe that you will finish the campaign gloriously". Villeroi joined the army, and his generals – the Duke of Savoy, Catinat, and the Prince of Vaudémont – and marched to find the enemy, confident he would drive them from Italy.

== Battle ==
Eugene welcomed the prospect of a decisive battle, and waited on the eastern side of the Oglio to be attacked. The Imperial commander had chosen his ground carefully, entrenching his troops and guns in front of the small fortress of Chiari. Streams protected his position on three sides: as there was not enough room for a cavalry engagement, Eugene could count on a frontal attack by the French infantry. Two battalions and a few pieces of artillery were placed in Chiari itself.

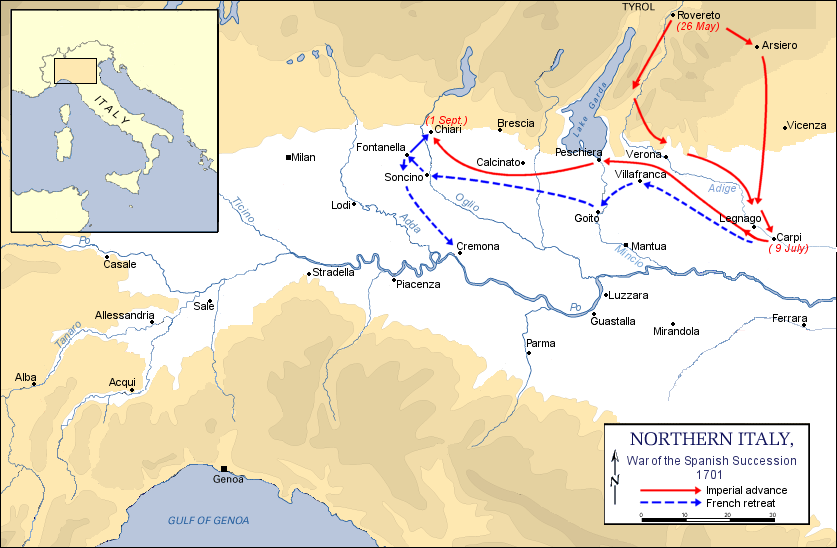
The north Italian campaign, 1701

Villeroi ignored Catinat's warning that Eugene was in a strong position, remarking that the King, "had not sent so many brave men just to look at the enemy through their spy glasses." On 1 September the Franco-Spanish infantry advanced. Deceived by the report of spies that the Imperialists were retiring, Villeroi crossed the Oglio and pushed on to Chiari expecting to attack their rear guard. The attack began around 2 p.m. when three French brigades approached Chiari and overpowered the Imperial troops there without much difficulty. However, instead of facing the rear guard the French commander encountered the whole Imperial army securely entrenched in their positions. As the Bourbons' army approached the Imperial positions, Eugene forbade his men to fire. Loading their artillery with canister shot, they only unleashed a withering fire when the Bourbon army entered point-blank range. This disordered the attackers and a chaos ensued which the French and Spanish commanders could not suppress. While this was going on Chiari was recaptured by the Imperials after a fierce struggle. The Bourbons were driven back with heavy casualties in a contest as destructive as any battle during the war in Italy. With only minor losses the Imperial army had inflicted over 3,000 casualties in the ranks, and over 250 officers. This number would grow rapidly as fever attacked the wounded.

Villeroi lost personal control during the battle, and Catinat, despite being wounded, had to organise a retreat. The French dug themselves in only a mile or so away from the Austrians on the same side of the Oglio. Here, the two opposing sides remained for the next two months: the French were too much discouraged by their repulse to resume the assault, and Eugene was unwilling to risk the advantages he had gained by attacking the French in their strong defensive position. However, as autumn advanced, conditions deteriorated in both camps: fodder was so short that Eugene's horses were forced to eat fallen leaves. But the French, whose camp was built on marshy ground, suffered most, and they moved out first in mid-November, crossing the Oglio before entering winter quarters in the Duchy of Milan.

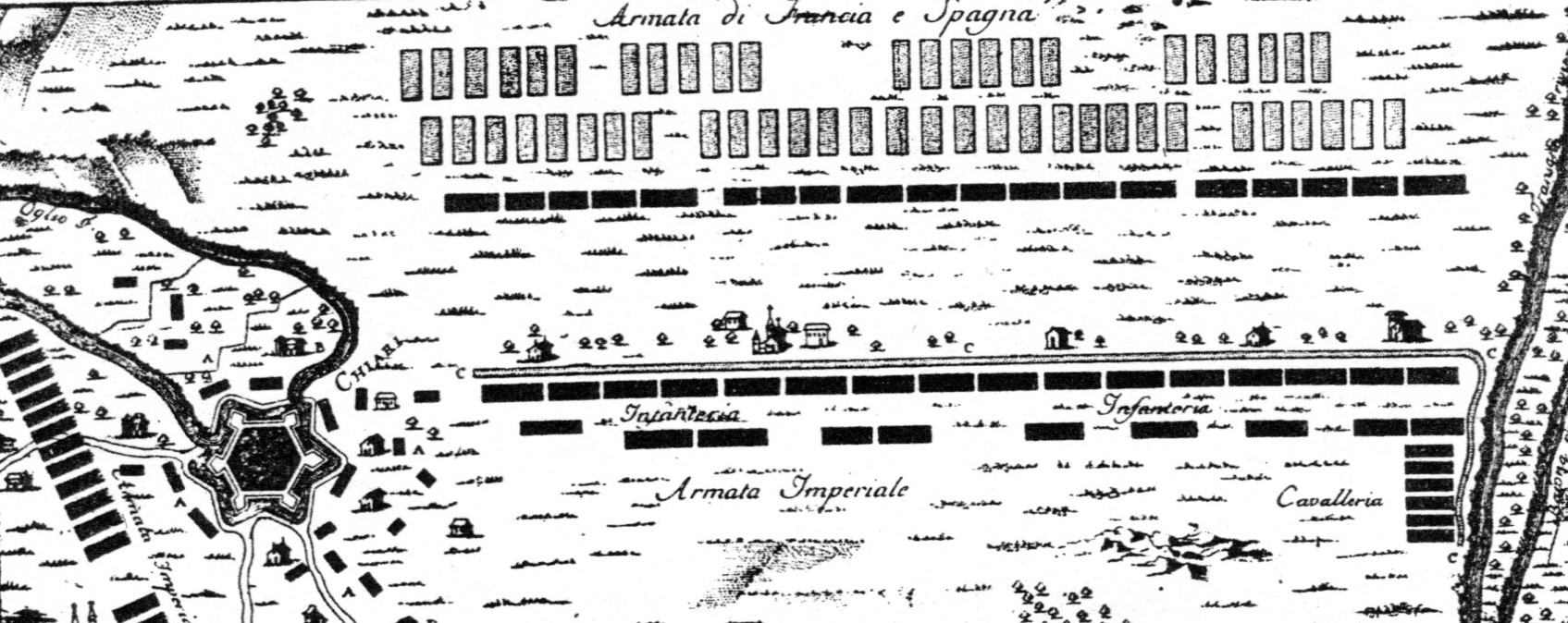
Initial disposition of both forces.

== Aftermath ==
In Milan, the French presence proved increasingly unpopular: five million livres for soldiers' pay and lodgings, and two million for fodder, had soon been imposed on the local population, most of which had to be taken by force. For his winter quarters Eugene proceeded to reduce the whole Duchy of Mantua, except the capital and Goito, which he closely blockaded; shortly after he occupied Mirandola and Guastalla. Eugene's relationship with the local population had been good and he had kept a tight control: he had executed 48 of his men for looting, telling the Emperor that he had 'imposed more severe discipline than has possibly ever been seen in an army'. Eugene had received little cash from the Emperor, far less than he expected, but he had secured a sound footing in northern Italy and, as hoped, his success helped to encourage the Maritime Powers to come to the aid of Leopold I. Since the beginning of the year Count Wratislaw had been in London as Imperial minister, pressing for assistance. With Eugene's two victories (Carpi and Chiari), Leopold I had proved he would fight to protect his interests, giving Wratislaw the arguments he needed to push through the alliance with the Maritime Powers. On 7 September 1701 – within a week of the battle – England and the Dutch Republic signed the second treaty of the Grand Alliance, backing the Emperor's claims to the Spanish possessions in Italy.

The French were still in Milan, but their position was weak: morale was poor and desertion was high. Louis XIV wrote to Villeroi urging him to work closely with Catinat and, "not again to attack the enemy without advantage." "If you do … the King, my grandson, will lose Italy." By October French optimism for the campaign was gone, but Louis XIV hoped to send reinforcements for next year's campaign, believing the Emperor would not be able to make a comparable increase in Eugene's strength. However, the campaign season was not yet over. As Villeroi settled down for the winter, Eugene was preparing to attack him at his headquarters in Cremona.

== Sources ==
- De Vryer, Abraham (1737). Histori van François Eugenius, prins van Savoije-Soissons (in Dutch). Loveringh en De Jonge.
