= Battle of Carpi =

1701 battle during the War of the Spanish Succession

- Part of the War of the Spanish Succession
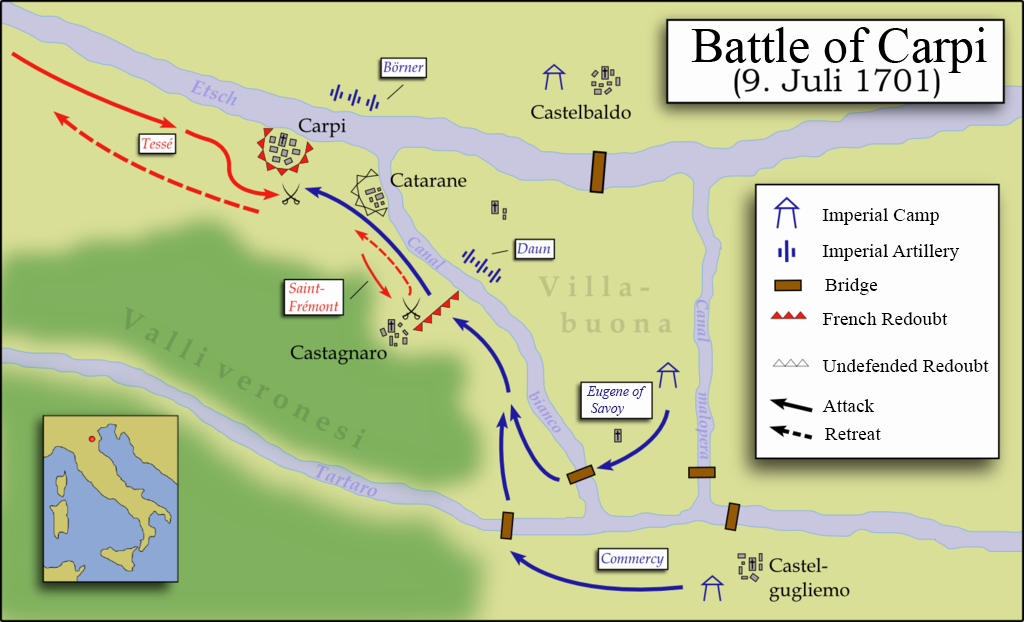
Date	9 July 1701
Location	Carpi, near Legnago; 45°08′13.90″N 11°23′41.50″E
Result	Austrian victory

Belligerents
Habsburg Monarchy	Kingdom of France

Commanders and leaders
Prince Eugene of Savoy	Nicolas Catinat

Strength
About 17,000	About 11,400

Casualties and losses
Approximately 42 dead (2 officers), and 50–60 wounded (7 officers)	Approximately 350 casualties (50 officers), and 109 taken prisoner (9 officers)

The Battle of Carpi was a series of engagements in the summer of 1701, and the first battle of the War of the Spanish Succession that took place on 9 July 1701 between France and Austria. It was a minor skirmish that the French commander decided was not worth fighting, but his soldiers were displeased at his decision to retreat, and he was subsequently replaced.

== Prelude ==
In Italy the emperor took the initiative, and an Austrian army under Prince Eugene, intended to overrun the Spanish possessions in the Peninsula, assembled in Tyrol in the early summer, while the opposing army (French, Spaniards, and Piedmontese), commanded by Marshal Catinat, was slowly drawing together between the Chiese and the Adige. But supply difficulties hampered Eugene, and the French were able to occupy the strong positions of the Rivoli defile above Verona. There Catinat thought himself secure, as all the country to the east was Venetian and neutral.

But Eugene, while making ostentatious preparations to enter Italy by the Adige or Lake Garda or the Brescia road, secretly reconnoitred passages over the mountains between Rovereto and the Vicenza district. On 27 May, taking great precaution as to secrecy, and requesting the Venetian authorities to offer no opposition so long as his troops behaved well, Eugene began his march by paths that no army had used since Charles V's time, and on the 28 May his army was on the plains.

His first object was to cross the Adige without fighting, and also by ravaging the duke of Mantua Charles IV's private estates (sparing the possessions of the common people) to induce that prince to change sides. Catinat was completely surprised, for he had counted upon Venetian neutrality, and when in the search for a passage over the lower Adige, Eugene's army spread to Legnago and beyond, he made the mistake of supposing that the Austrians intended to invade the Spanish possessions south of the Po River. His first dispositions had, of course, been for the defence of the Rivoli approaches, but he now thinned out his line until it reached to the Po.

== Battle ==
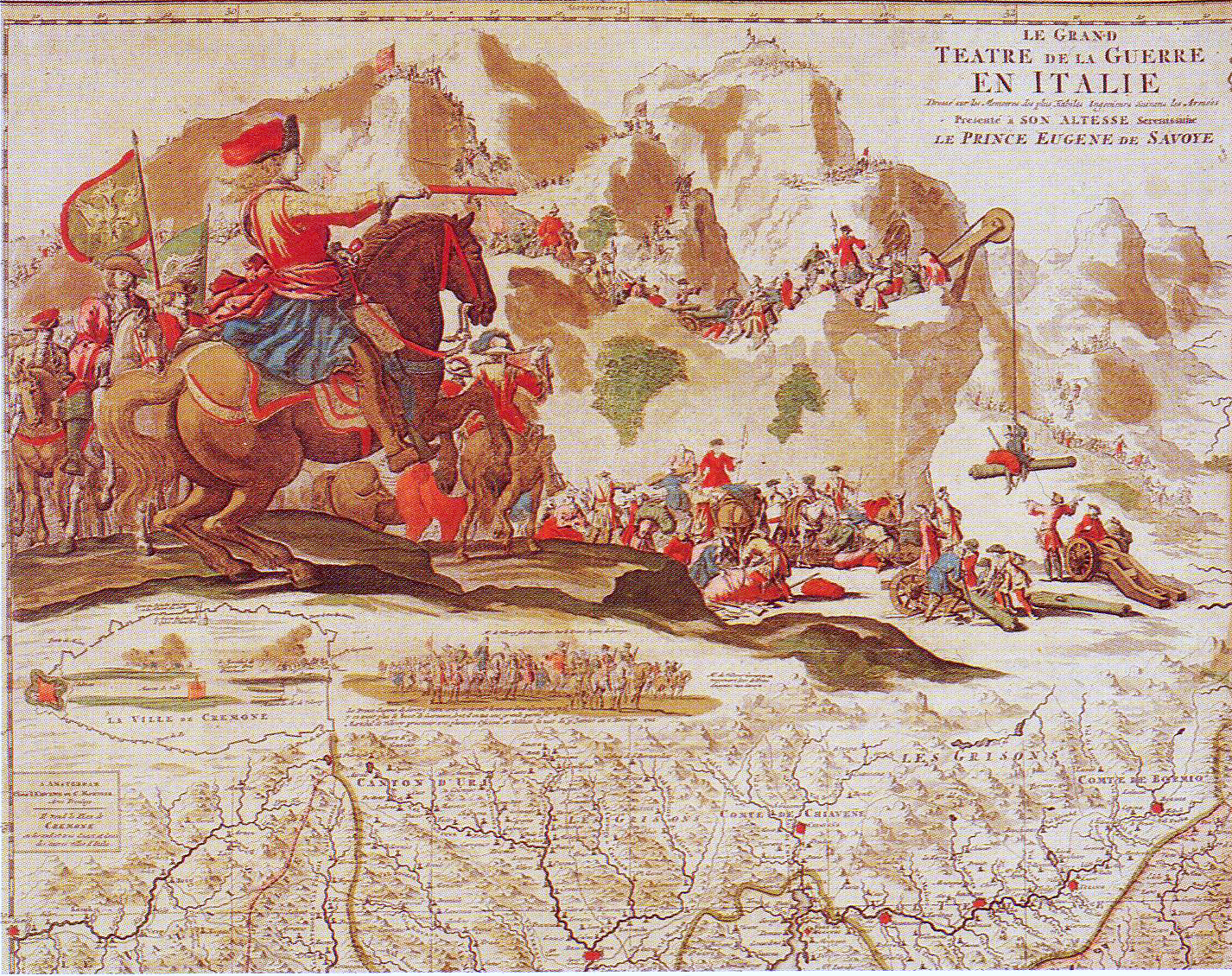
Prince Eugene crossing the Alps.

After five weeks of cautious manoeuvring on both sides, Eugene found an unguarded spot about 10 km southeast of Legnago near the town of Castagnaro. With the usual precautions of secrecy (deceiving even his own army), he crossed the lower Adige in the night of 8/9 July, and overpowered the small cavalry corps that alone was encountered at Carpi (9 July).

Catinat at once concentrated his scattered army backwards on the Mincio, while Eugene turned northward and regained touch with his old line of supply, Roveredo-Rivoli. For some time Eugene was in great difficulties for supplies, as the Venetians would not allow his barges to descend the Adige. At last, however, he made his preparations to cross the Mincio close to Peschiera del Garda and well beyond Catinat's left, with the intention of finding a new supply area about Brescia. This was executed on 28 July.

Catinat's cavalry, though coming within sight of Eugene's bridges, offered no opposition. It seems that the marshal was well content to find that his opponent had no intention of attacking the Spanish possessions in the Peninsula; at any rate, Catinat fell back quietly to the Oglio. But his army resented his retreat before the much smaller force of the Austrians and, early in August, his rival Tessé reported this to Paris, whereupon Marshal Villeroy, a favourite of Louis, was sent to take command.
