= Battle of Marsaglia =

1693 battle of the Nine Years' War

Coordinates: 44.4500°N 7.9667°E

- Part of the Nine Years' War
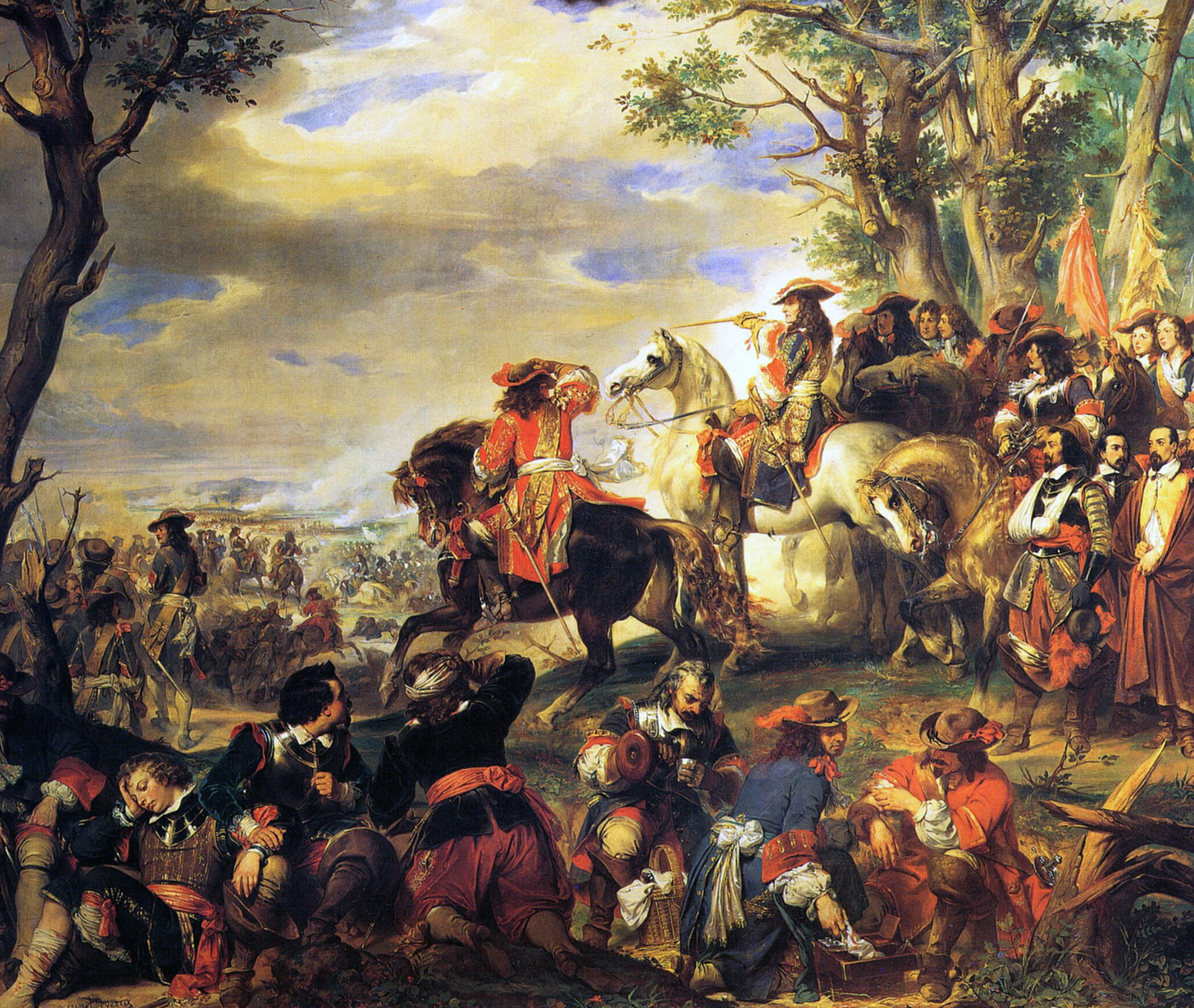
- Catinat at Marsaglia, 4 October 1693
Date	4 October 1693
Location	Marsaglia, near Turin, present-day Italy
Result	French victory

Belligerents
France	Savoy; Spain

Commanders and leaders
(Kingdom of France) Nicolas Catinat	(Duchy of Savoy) Victor Amadeus II of Savoy

Strength
40,000	36,000

Casualties and losses
3,000	9,000 dead or wounded 2,000 captured

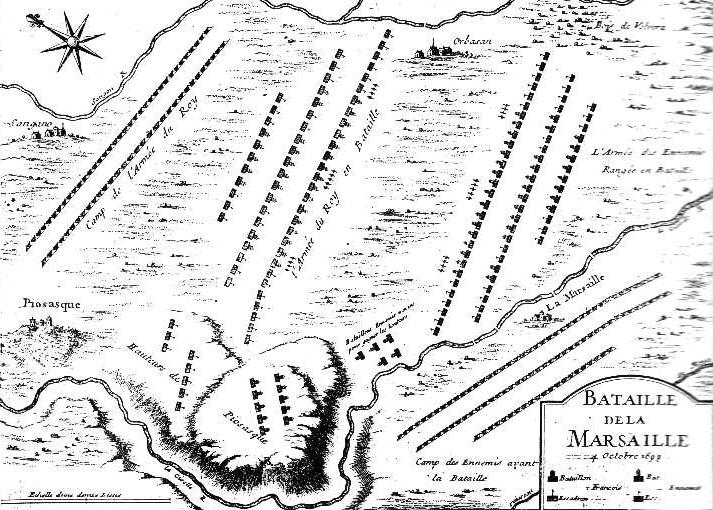
Map of Marsaglia

The Battle of Marsaglia or Orbassano was a battle in the Nine Years' War, fought in Italy on 4 October 1693, between the French army of Marshal Nicolas Catinat and the army of the Grand Alliance under Duke Victor Amadeus II of Savoy.

Catinat, advancing from Fenestrelle and Susa to the relief Pinerolo, defended by the count of Tessé and which the duke of Savoy was besieging, took up a position in formal order of battle north of the village of Marsaglia, near Orbassano. Here, on 4 October, the duke of Savoy attacked him with his whole army, front to front, but the greatly superior regimental efficiency of the French, and Catinat's minute attention to detail in arraying them, gave the new marshal a victory that was a worthy pendant to Neerwinden.

The Piedmontese and their allies lost approx. 11,000 killed, wounded and prisoners, as against Catinat's 3,000.

Marsaglia is one of the first (if not the first) instances of a bayonet charge by a long deployed line of infantry. Hussars figured here for the first time in western Europe. A regiment of them had been raised in 1692 from deserters from the Austrian service. It is also notable as one of the first major battles to see the new Irish Brigade in action for the French army.
