= Jean-François Coste (physician) =

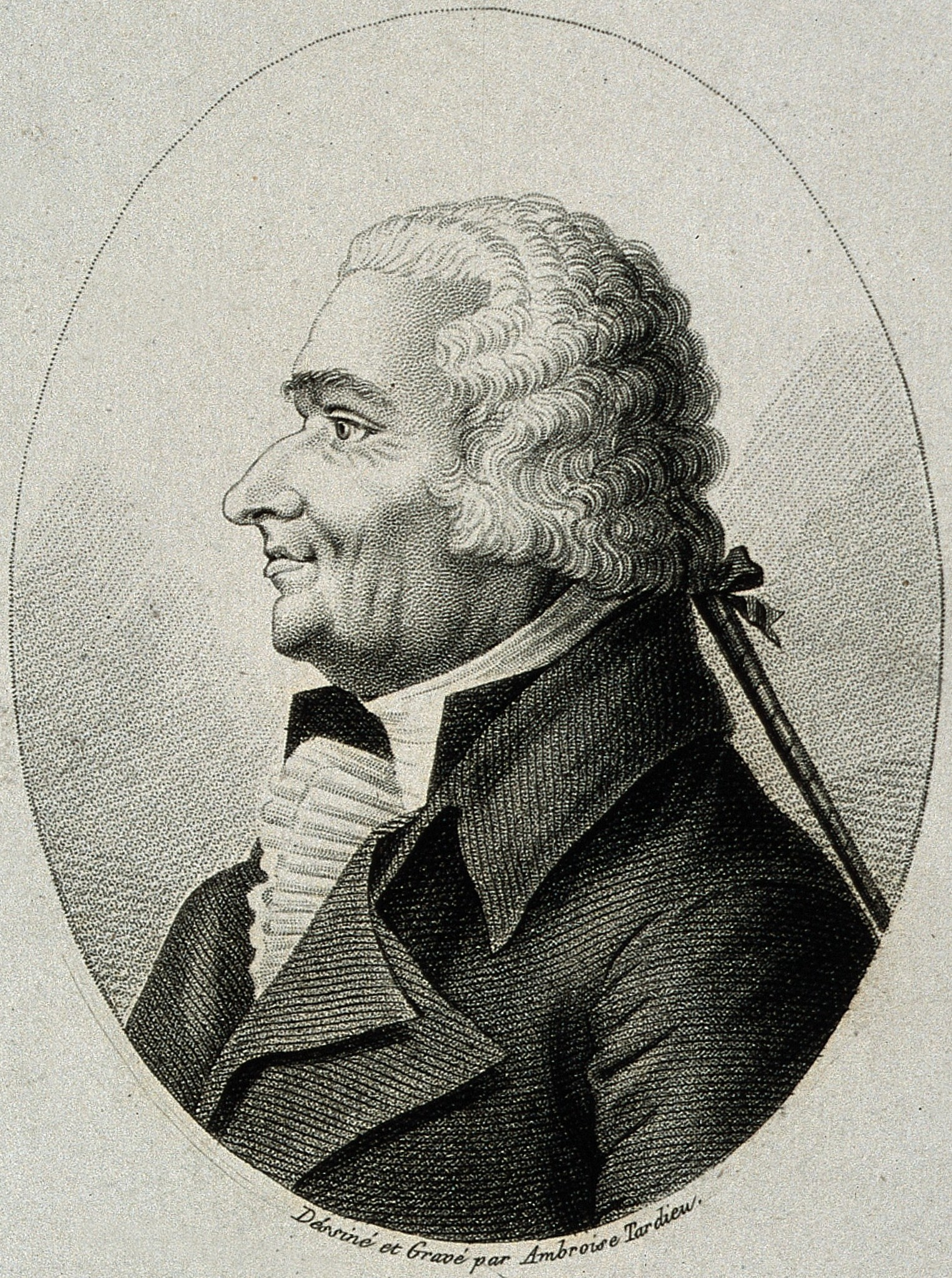
Jean-François Coste (physician)

Jean-François Coste (14 June 1741 – 8 November 1819) was the chief physician of the French expeditionary forces in the American revolution.

== Biography ==
Born in France to a physician and his wife, Coste was educated in Belley and then Lyon before studying medicine in Paris, earning his Doctorate in 1763 in Valencia, Spain. He returned home to join his father’s practice before his work on an epidemic in Gex made him well-known in France. Before long, Coste was in contact with men such as Jean-Jaques Rousseau, Voltaire, and the chief physician of the French army. He worked in a hospital in Calais before becoming chief physician to the forces sent to America under Rochambeau in 1780. During the war, Coste treated French and American soldiers, earning an honorary Doctor of Medicine degree from William and Mary College in the process.

In 1783, he was elected as a member to the American Philosophical Society. That same year, he returned to his physicianship at Calais before becoming Chief Consulting Physician of the Camps and Armies of the King the following year, and then Mayor of Versailles in 1790. During the Reign of Terror, he remained Chief Physician of the Armies, but lost his seat on the Council of Health. In 1808, he left France to study the inner-workings of hospitals in Milan, Geneva, and Alexandria, and upon his return the following year, Coste served as chief physician of the Hôtel des Invalides. He occupied many of these offices until a lung condition took his life.
