= Siege of Ath (1697) =

1697 siege during the Nine Years' War

- Part of the Nine Years' War
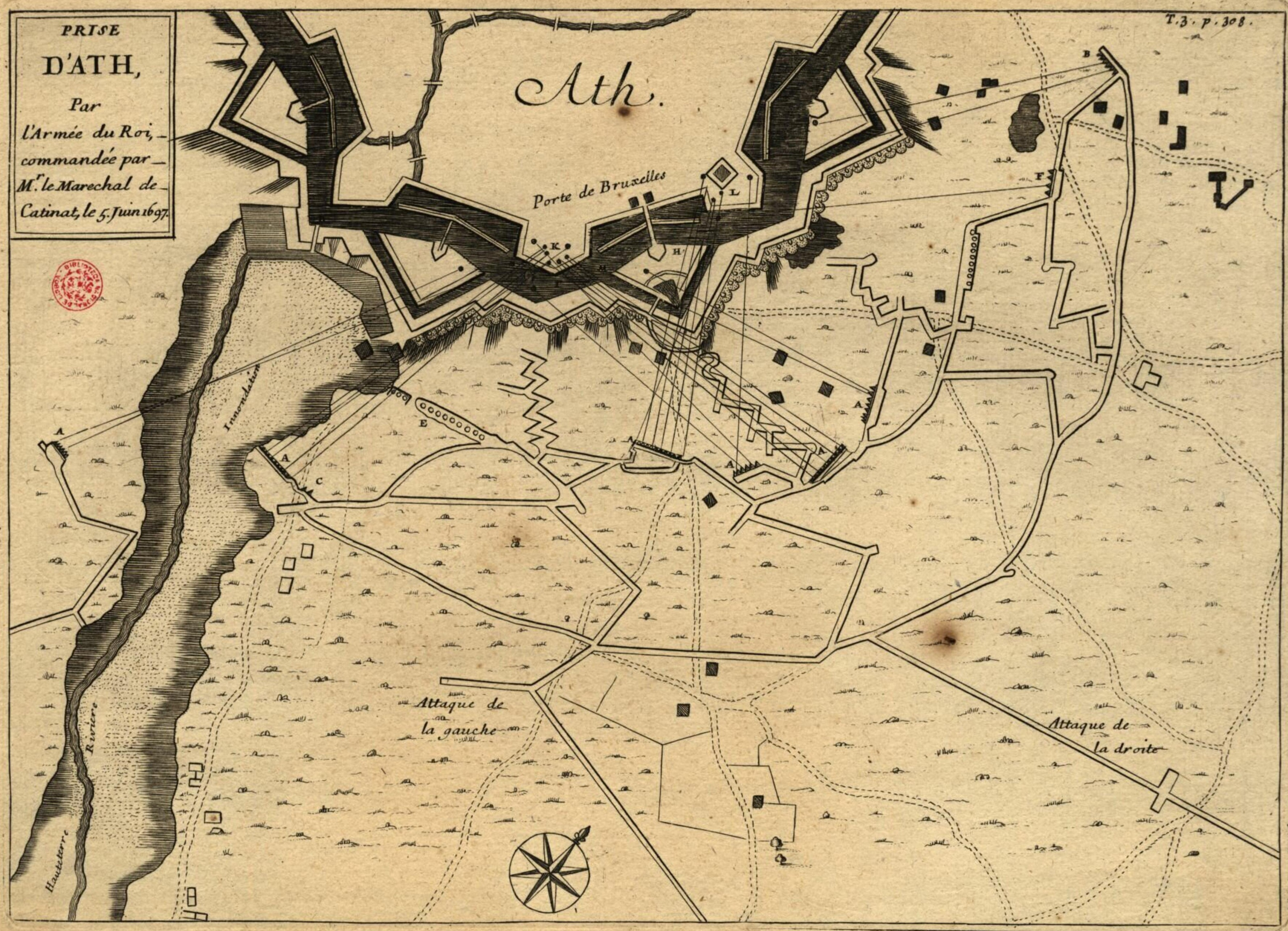
- Engraved map of the siege of Ath in 1697
Date	Investment: 16 May 1697 – 5 June 1697 (2 weeks and 6 days); Siege: 22 May 1697 – 5 June 1697 (2 weeks)
Location	Ath, Spanish Netherlands, present-day Belgium 50.617°N 3.767°E
Result	French victory

Belligerents
France	Holy Roman Empire; Spain; Dutch Republic

Commanders and leaders
(Kingdom of France) Marquis de Vauban (Kingdom of France) Nicolas Catinat	(Holy Roman Empire) Comte de Roeux (Holy Roman Empire) Prince of Anhalt-Zerbst

Strength
40,000 men 20,000 civilian laborers 34 siege guns 39 other guns 41 smaller artillery pieces	3,850 men 32 artillery pieces

Casualties and losses
200 killed and wounded	3,700 killed, wounded and captured 32 artillery pieces captured

The siege of Ath (15 May 1697 – 5 June 1697) was a siege of the Nine Years' War. The French stockpiled 266,000 French pounds of gunpowder for the siege and used less than half of it. Consumption of other material amounted to 34,000 pounds of lead, 27,050 cannonballs, 3,400 mortar bombs, 950 grenades and 12,000 sandbags. The financial costs were 89,250 French livres. After the garrison's capitulation, 6,000 peasant workers filled up the trenches. Of the 62 French engineers present, two were killed and seven seriously wounded. This demonstration of French military potency, combined with the successful storming of Barcelona the same year, convinced the Allies to come to terms with France in the treaty of Ryswick, thus ending the war.

The siege was hailed by contemporaries as Vauban's masterpiece and the most efficient siege ever conducted, owing to its speed, low costs and the modernity of the eight-bastion fortress, which had been designed by Vauban himself 25 years earlier.

== Background ==
When the War of the Grand Alliance broke out in 1688 the modern Spanish fortress of Ath stood on the sidelines of the fighting. The French armies of Louis XIV menaced the more important fortified towns of Brussels and Oudenarde, while leaving untouched the medium-sized Ath with its 6,000 inhabitants.

Peace negotiations to end the war got underway in 1695 in Ryswick but the absence of a knockout blow on either side encouraged the participants to continue the struggle. When the Duchy of Savoy defected from the Grand Alliance in late 1696, Louis XIV saw that the time had come decide the issue on the Spanish Netherlands front. In mid-April 1697 French forces began the campaign and prepared to besiege the strong fortress of Ath to demonstrate France's military pre-eminence to the Allied negotiators.

== Prelude ==
In 1540 Ath's medieval walls and château had been upgraded by the Spanish. Upon the French capture of the fort during the War of Devolution in June 1667 when the Spanish garrison fled the town without fighting, the walls were razed by Vauban in 1668. From 1668 to 1674 he replaced the ancient fortifications with eight new trace italienne angled bastions. In 1678 the modern fort was handed back to the Spanish as part of the Treaties of Nijmegen.

The fort's curtain wall was surrounded by a ditch that made the top of the wall 30-feet high to someone standing at the bottom. When opened, a sluice gate added eight feet to the water's height, which was normally only several feet high. The bastions were within effective musket range of each other or no more than 600 feet apart. The bastions were separated by chevron-shaped outworks called tenailles located above the ditch. In front of the outworks were huge, triangular ravelin islands with masonry fortifications that could house hundreds of soldiers and several small-caliber guns. The outer wall of the ditch was known as the counterscarp, which served as the covered way around the fort. At Ath it was located 120 feet beyond the ravelins. The angled salients of the open-air walkway were usually the first to be captured but smaller re-entry angles between and behind the salients could be packed with dozens of troops to prevent the besieger from exploiting the capture of one section of the counterscarp. Two of the Ath bastions also had reinforced bulwarks in front of them for additional protection. The sloped glacis was the final piece of the outer perimeter. It presented the besiegers with murderous interlocking fields of fire from the defenders, who also had a double line of palisades at the top of the slope. A contemporary journal called Vauban's creation a "perfect model of the Art". The French engineer himself had given some thought to the matter of besieging the fort ever since he had designed it.

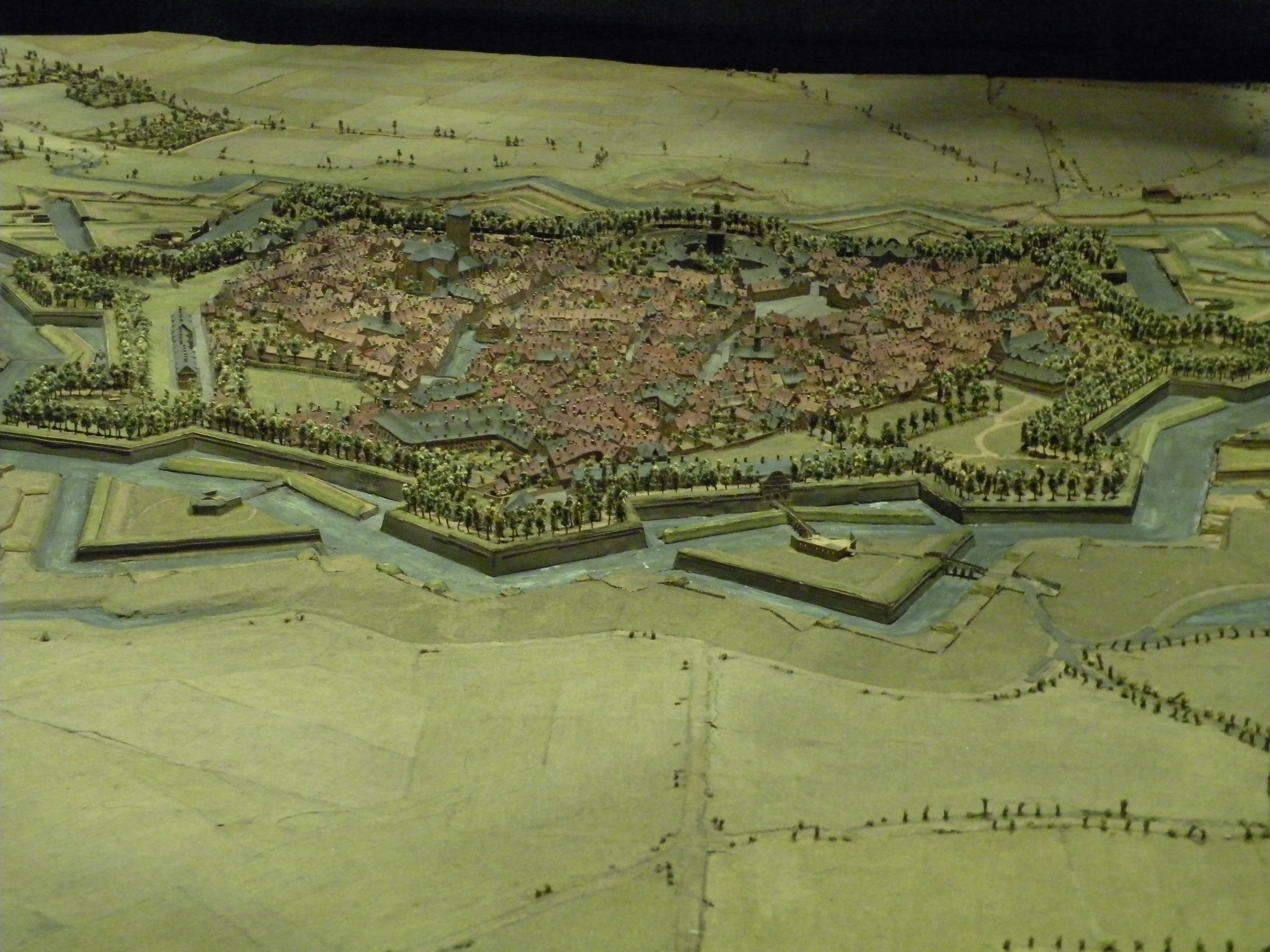
Plan-relief of Ath constructed in 1697 after its capture

The commander of the siege force, Marshal Nicolas Catinat and his chief engineer Marshal Vauban had a strong working relationship and would cooperate seamlessly during the siege. Catinat had 50 battalions and as many squadrons of cavalry, some 40,000 men in total. Vauban was assisted by Jean de Mesgrigny and 62 select engineers. Marshals Boufflers and Villeroi commanded the two covering forces, whose combined strength amounted to 140,000 men.

The under-strength Allied garrison of 3,850 men was commanded by the lethargic 65-year old Comte de Roeux. Due to Roeux's frequent inactivity, command devolved to Anthony Günther, Prince of Anhalt-Zerbst. The Marquis de Conflans had been ordered to take command of the fortress' regiments but was captured by the French on 16 May before he could make the journey. The Allies had prioritized the more important forts of Brussels and Oudenarde and would be caught by surprise when the siege of Ath began.

== Investment ==
A 12,000-man French cavalry force arrived before Ath on the morning of 16 May, securing all roads, river crossings, abbeys and buildings within a several-kilometer radius. Catinat's main force left Helchin the same day, crossed the Scheldt river and established itself in three camps about 10 kilometers from the fortress. The camps were separated by the Western and Eastern branches of the River Dender, which meet at Ath, and the French got to work setting up siege lines and regimental quarters and building bridges to facilitate communications. Boufflers' and Villeroi's armies took up covering positions on Catinat's flanks.

Wealthy women inside the fort were let go by the French the same day. On 17 May, the Allied garrison indiscriminately burned down the buildings outside the fort to deny the French of cover and concealment, without giving any thought to the most likely French avenues of approach. They also failed to burn down the hedgerows and gardens, of which the French would make use. The Allies directed inaccurate cannon fire at the far too distant French camps. All of this was noted by Vauban, who concluded that Roeux was incompetent.

Civilian surgeons from the surrounding cities such as Valenciennes and Cambrai were conscripted to assist the French military surgeons with the wounded. 4,000 wagons were required to transport supplies and armaments and their civilian driver teams had to recruited from the region as well. Some 20,000 peasants were ordered to help dig the lines of circumvallation to defend against attacks from the garrison or possible relief forces.

== Siege ==
The siege of Ath in 1697 began on 15 May with the encirclement of the fortress by an 11,000-strong cavalry detachment under the command of Captain Rose; on 16 May, a 40,000-strong siege army under Marshal Catinat arrived, and Marshal Villeroi's observation corps was stationed in Ostiche to cover the siege . By this time, the fortress was in a significantly neglected state by the Spaniards; they managed to restore, and only partially, only the counterscarps and glacis, and install palisades here and there . Conducting approaches to the Burgundian bastion was extremely difficult due to the flooding of the Dandre River . But along the rest of the stretch, siege work was quite possible. The defenders, under the command of Count von Kex, numbered only 4,100 people. The fortress's armament was deplorable: upon surrender, only 31 cannons and one mortar were actually serviceable. Against them, with 40,000 men, the besiegers brought into action 34 24-pounder cannons, 6 12-pounders and 8-pounders, and 48 mortars - a total of 94 cannons.

Already on 22 May, at 8 o'clock on a rainy dark evening, Vauban had laid the first parallel at a distance of 575 meters from the fortress's wharves. The parallel was 3,200 meters long, but its laying was nevertheless completed without losses for the attackers. The second parallel, 300 meters from the fortress, was successfully laid the following night, and also connected to the rear by approaches, along the capitals of the Namur and Limburg bastions and the ravelin between them. On the third night, the second parallel was completed and saps were started to the outgoing corners of the attacked wharves. Considering the first parallel to be a covering means against the initial sorties, Vauban decided only on the fourth night to lay five ricochet batteries in the second parallel, on the continuation of the faces of the attacked buildings, for shooting with reduced charges. This was a bold innovation, but the good result of the bombardment quickly showed that the defenders were not in a position to counter such fire. The small number of guns responding from the fortress were forced to change places after a few shots from the ricochet batteries. On the sixth night, the saps were already brought to a distance of 50 meters from the radiating angles of the bridgeheads, and it became possible to build another ricochet battery opposite the Limburg bastion and two mortar batteries on either side of it, each with 12 guns. The last two batteries were intended to destroy the main sluice, by which the water of the Dendera was kept at a height of 10 feet above the ordinary and provided for the flood. On the eighth night, all three radiating angles of the covered route were attacked, and the besieger, having crowned the glacis . During the attack, Vauban received a concussion in the left shoulder, which, however, did not stop his activity. The besiegers began building breach batteries on the following, ninth, night . The besieged detonated a mine under the ravelin's spire, which did no harm to the besiegers.

On 31 May, the sluice on the Dendera was destroyed by mortar batteries, and the river dropped to its normal level in 5 hours. On the tenth night from the beginning of the siege, 1 June, a breach was made in the ravelin, which was immediately occupied by the attackers. The defenders of the ravelin, being cut off from the fortress because the bridge that served them for communication was destroyed by fire from the besiegers, surrendered the ravelin along with the redoubt to the French on 3 June. In the following two nights, the eleventh and twelfth, two more breach batteries were added opposite the bastion faces and 21 mortars were installed to fire on the interior of the fortress.

At midday on 3 June, the wall of the Namur bastion collapsed over a distance of 30 meters from the fire of the breach batteries, and by 5 June the fire of these same batteries had made 3 breaches with convenient avalanches for climbing, which could be climbed by a front of 20-30 people. By this time, the dam across the moat in front of the Namur bastion was completed, and the attacker was already preparing for a decisive assault, when the garrison of the fortress surrendered on the 14th day of the siege (on the night of 4–5 June).

== Results ==
The attackers suffered losses of only 200 killed and wounded, and 31 cannons and 1 mortar were taken during the surrender. The garrison of 3,000 people was taken prisoner. The French owed the siege's success exclusively to Vauban, who, knowing the fortress well, managed to paralyze the fortress's strength and the garrison's energy by skillfully conducting approaches and using ricochet fire. This siege is usually considered an example of fortress warfare. Vauban himself wrote in his memoirs:

“I do not think that another such correct siege has been found that would so quickly and with such little difficulty deliver into the hands of the besieger such an excellent fortress as the one we took.”

By the Peace of Ryswick in 1697, Ath was returned to Spain.
