= Diego Dávila Mesía y Guzmán, 3rd Marquess of Leganés =

Spanish noble and politician

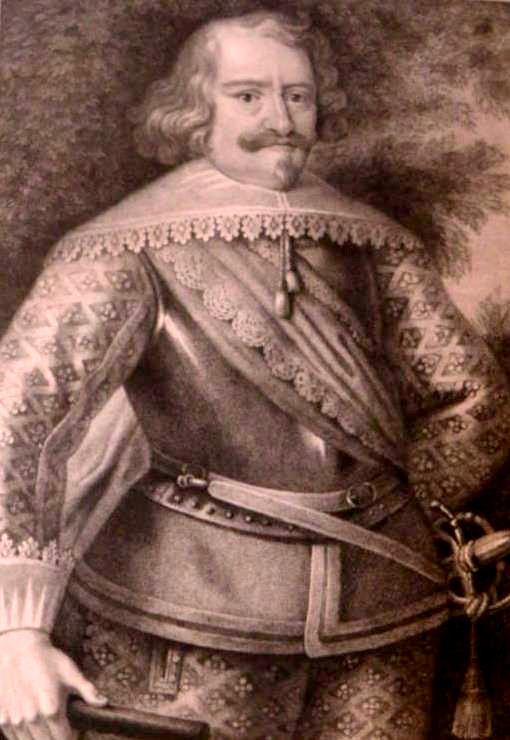
Diego Dávila Mesía y Guzmán.

Diego Dávila Mesía y Guzmán, 3rd Marquess of Leganés (around 1648 – 1711) was a Spanish noble and politician.

== Biography ==
He was the son of Gaspar Felípez de Guzmán y Spinola, second marquess of Leganés and grandson of Diego Felipez de Guzmán, 1st Marquess of Leganés. His father was viceroy of Valencia when he died in 1666. Diego succeeded his father as viceroy, even when he was only 18 years old. He was replaced the next year by Vespasiano Vincenzo Gonzaga.

Diego, also called Diego Felipez de Guzmán after his famous grandfather, had a successful political career.
He became viceroy of Catalonia in 1678, viceroy of Navarre in 1684 and again of Catalonia between 1685 and 1688.
Between 1691 and 1698, he was Governor of the Duchy of Milan, in the midst of the Nine Years' War with France.

During the War of Spanish Succession, he switched sides from the Bourbon to the Habsburg party in 1705.

He married Jerónima de Benavides, daughter of viceroy of Peru Diego de Benavides y de la Cueva. They had no children. After his death in 1711, his titles went to Antonio Gaspar de Moscoso Osorio y Aragón.

== Sources ==
- Geneanet
- En reino extraño: Relación de la visita del Real Monasterio de Valldigna. By Fray Tomás Gómez
- Elenco de Grandezas y Títulos Nobiliarios Españoles, Instituto "Salazar y Castro", C.S.I.C.
