= Nicolas Catinat =

French military officer (1637–1712)

Marshal Nicolas Catinat
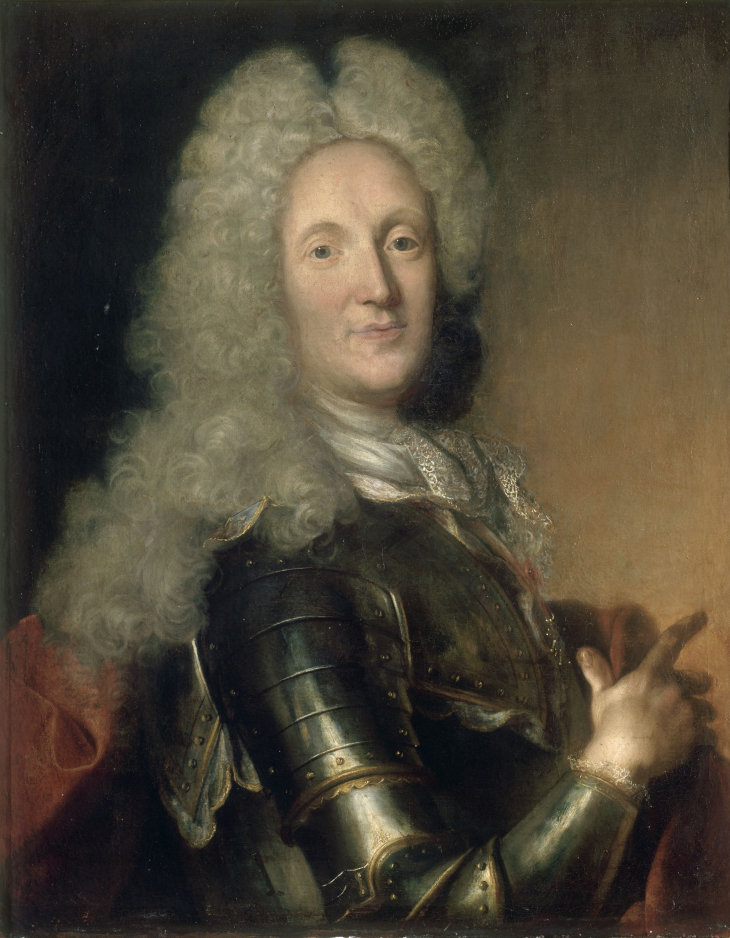
- Maréchal Catinat, by Robert Tournières, c. 1700–12
- Born: 1 September 1637; Paris, France
- Died: 22 February 1712 (aged 74); Saint-Gratien, France
- Military career
- Allegiance: Kingdom of France
- Branch: French Army
- Service years: 1660–1705
- Rank: Marshal of France
- Wars: War of Devolution; Siege of Lille; Franco-Dutch War; Nine Years' War; Siege of Philippsburg; Battle of Staffarda; Battle of Marsaglia; Siege of Ath; War of the Spanish Succession; Battle of Carpi; Battle of Chiari

Nicolas Catinat (French pronunciation: [nikɔla katina], 1 September 1637 - 22 February 1712) was a French military commander and Marshal of France under Louis XIV.

== Life ==
The son of a magistrate, Catinat was born in Paris on 1 September 1637. He entered the Gardes Françaises at an early age and distinguished himself at the Siege of Lille in 1667.

He became a brigadier ten years later, maréchal de camp in 1680, and lieutenant-general 1688. He served with great credit in the campaigns of 1676–1678 in Flanders during the Franco-Dutch War, and was later employed in the persecution of the Vaudois in 1686. After taking part in the Siege of Philippsburg at the opening of the Nine Years War, he was appointed to command the French troops in the south-eastern theatre of war. In 1691 he crossed into the County of Nice, and captured the towns Nice and Villefranche.

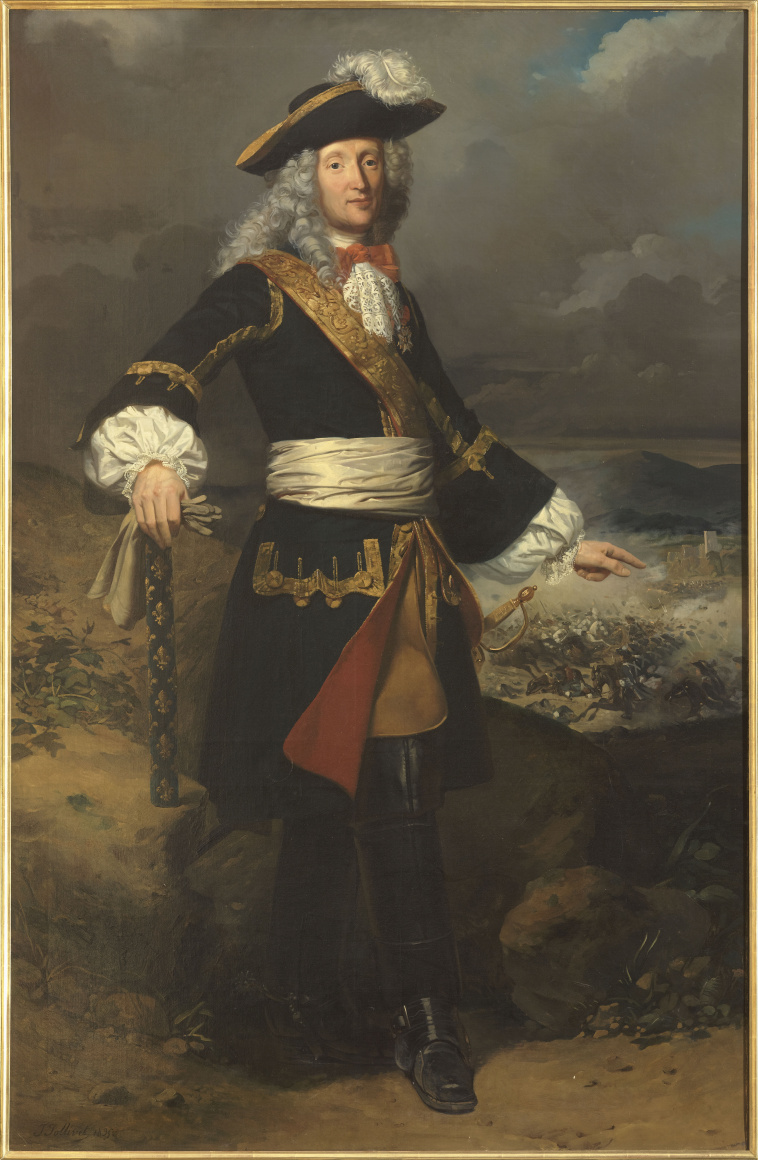
L. Roger, Nicolas Catinat, Maréchal de France, National Gallery of Art

His victories against Victor Amadeus of Savoy at the Battle of Staffarda in 1690, and the Battle of Marsaglia in 1693, were among his greatest achievements, (Victor Amadeus later abandoned the Allied coalition and concluded peace with King Louis XIV by signing the Treaty of Turin on 29 August 1696). In 1693 Catinat was made a marshal of France and in 1697 he led the French forces in the victorious Siege of Ath.

At the beginning of the War of the Spanish Succession, Catinat was placed in charge of operations in northern Italy, but he was much hampered by the orders of the French court and the weakness of his forces. Outmanoeuvred by Prince Eugene of Savoy, Catinat suffered a reverse at Carpi and was soon afterwards superseded by Marshal Villeroi.

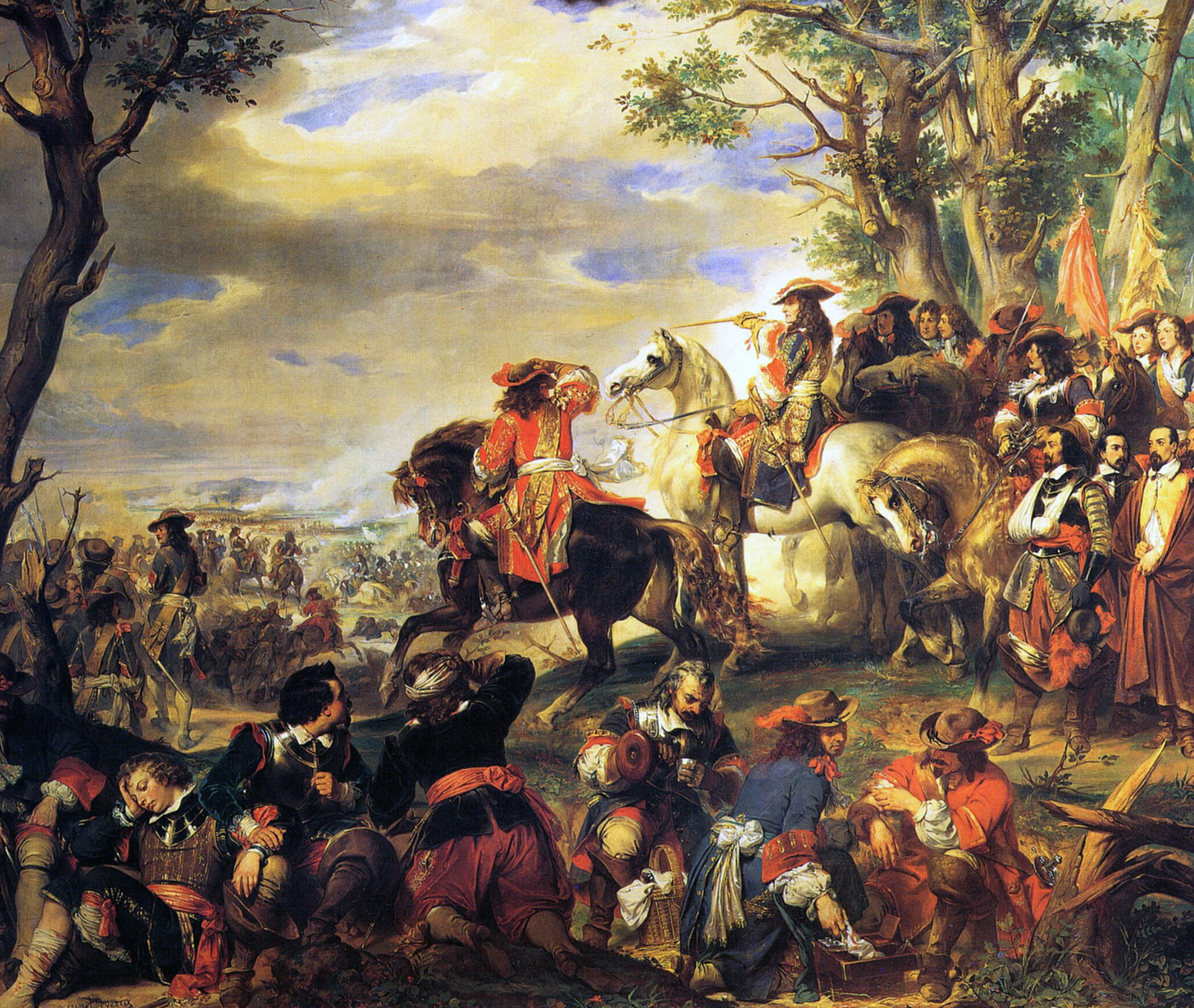
Catinat at the Battle of Marsaglia

With Catinat acting as Villeroi's second-in-command, French forces were again defeated by Eugene's Imperialists at the Battle of Chiari. Catinat died at Saint-Gratien in 1712. His memoirs were published in 1819.

The British historian Geoffrey Treasure sums up Catinat:

Catinat was not the typical soldier of this period. He had begun life as a lawyer, with no advantage of birth, and made his way by sheer merit. He was a careful general, thorough and sparing of the lives of his men, unambitious and something of a philosopher. After his failure in the Italian campaign of the next war [i.e., the War of the Spanish Succession], he retired to the country to cultivate his garden.

== Legacy ==
The aphorism "No man is a hero to his valet" is sometimes attributed to Catinat, as well as other sources, including Michel de Montaigne and Madame de Sévigné.
