= Battle of Staffarda =

1690 battle of the Nine Years' War

- Part of the Nine Years' War
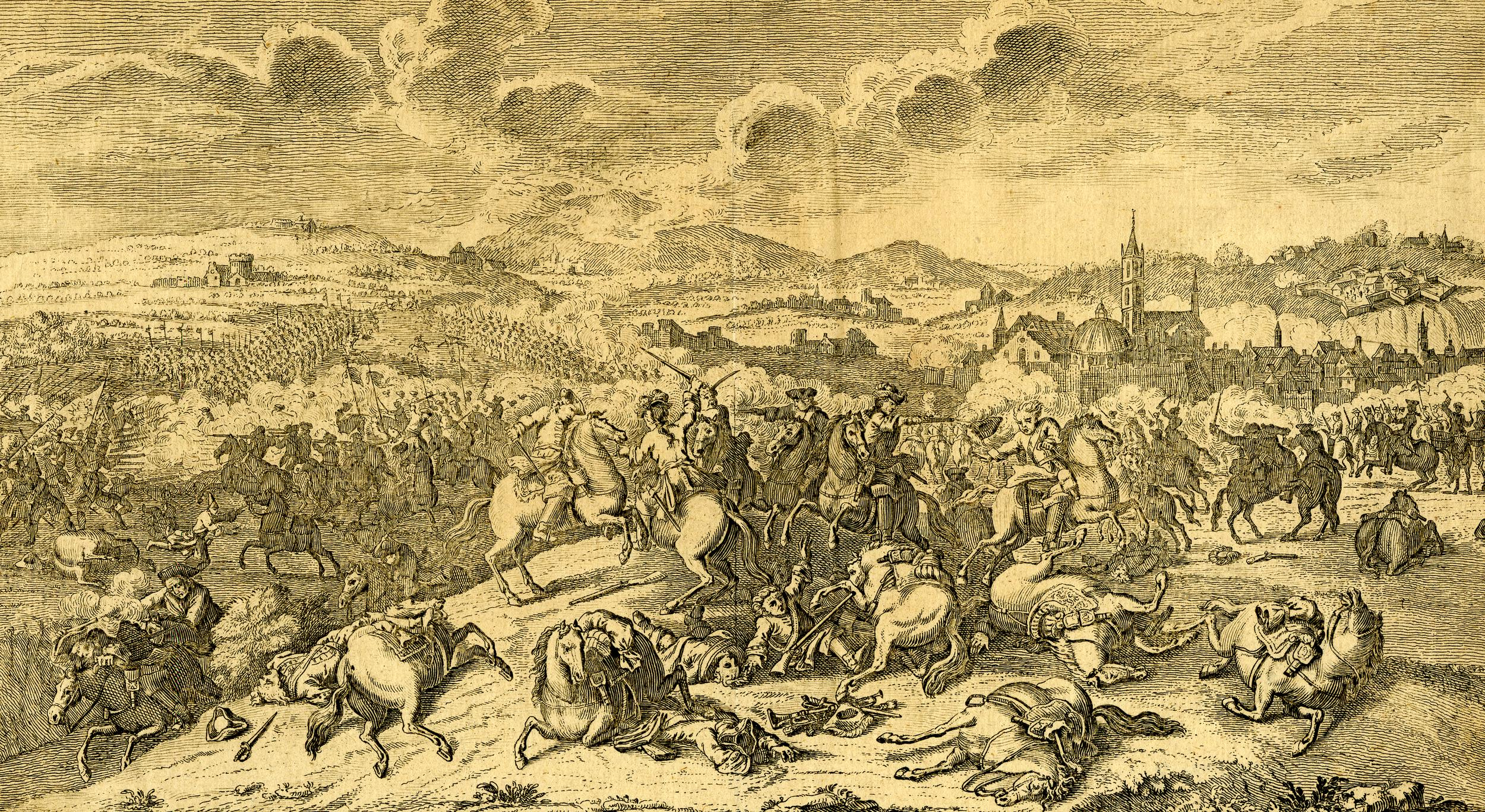
- 1785 illustration of the battle by George Bickham the Younger
Date	18 August 1690
Location	Staffarda, Piedmont
Result	French victory

Belligerents
France	Duchy of Savoy; Spain; Holy Roman Empire

Commanders and leaders
(Kingdom of France) Nicolas Catinat	(Duchy of Savoy) Victor Amadeus II (Habsburg monarchy) Prince Eugène of Savoy

Strength
12,000	18,000; 12 guns

Casualties and losses
1,000 to 2,000 killed or wounded	2,800 killed or wounded 1,200 captured 11 guns

The Battle of Staffarda took place on 18 August 1690 during the Nine Years' War in Piedmont, Northern Italy. The engagement was the first major battle of the Nine Years' War in Italy since Victor Amadeus II of Savoy joined the Grand Alliance against Louis XIV of France earlier that year.

A French force of around 12,000 under Nicolas Catinat defeated a Savoyard army of 18,000 led by Victor Amadeus and the Imperial general Prince Eugène of Savoy. Victory allowed Catinat to over-run most of Piedmont but he was unable to take the capital of Turin due to sickness, lack of men and supply problems.

== Background ==
By 1690, the Nine Years' War was in its third year, with both France and the Allies focusing their main effort in the Spanish Netherlands. Neither side was able to gain a decisive advantage in this theatre, or along the Rhine, leaving Northern Italy as the one area where the Allies could "open a door...into France".

The Savoyard state was split into several distinct areas: the County of Nice and the Duchy of Savoy, both of which are now within modern France, along with the Duchy of Aosta, and Principality of Piedmont. Like his predecessors, Louis XIV viewed Savoy as a French dependency, an outlook bolstered by control of two key fortresses in Piedmont. These were Pinerolo in the west, annexed by France in 1631, and Casale in the east, acquired in 1681 from Ferdinand Charles, Duke of Mantua and Montferrat.

== Prelude ==
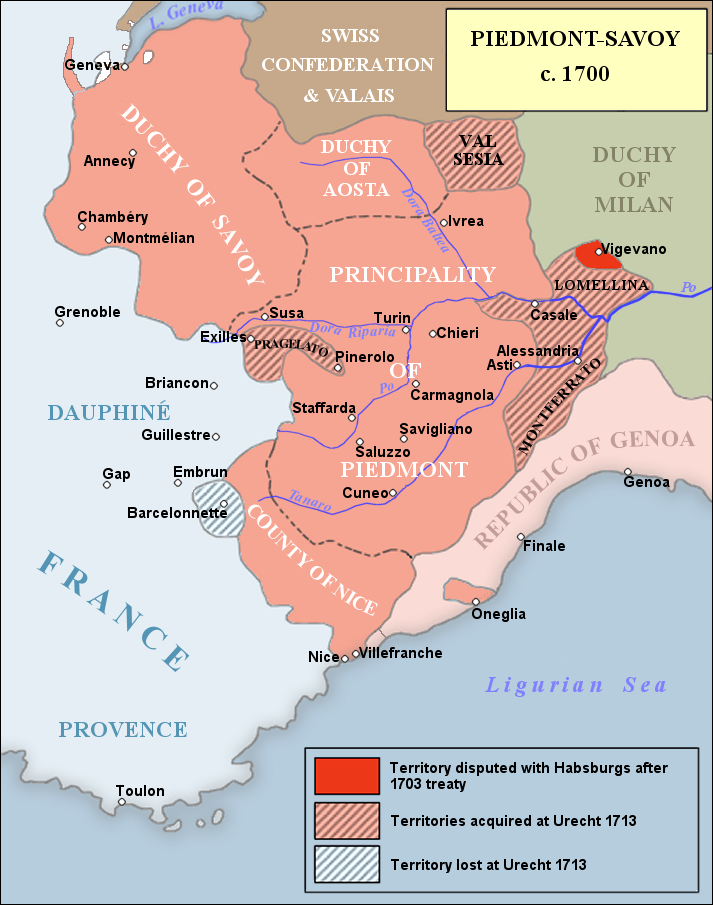
The Savoyard state

At the beginning of 1690, Victor Amadeus had yet to openly join the war; although his small army totalled only 8,000 men, Louis XIV understood that he had to retain Savoy in the French orbit. Ignoring Amadeus's own sovereign interests, the French sought guarantees and made their demands on the Duke: Amadeus was either to send 2,000 infantry and three dragoon regiments to assist French forces in the Spanish Netherlands – nearly half his army – or, he was to unite them with Nicolas Catinat's forces for an attack on the Spanish-ruled Duchy of Milan; he was also to hand over to Catinat the citadel of Turin and, further down the Po River, Verrua. If he did not do so he would, in Louvois' words, "be punished in such a manner that he remembers it for the rest of his life."

French demands were nothing less than an attack on Savoyard independence, and the intimidation ultimately proved counter-productive. In the early summer of 1690 Amadeus realised he had to stand up to France and he began to look towards the Grand Alliance. But he had conditions. Amadeus reiterated his family claim to the Duchy of Montferrat, over which the House of Savoy was in perennial dispute with the Duke of Mantua, stipulating the razing of Casale as the minimum he would accept in this region; he also demanded the reacquisition of Pinerolo as the sine qua non of Savoyard entry into the war on the Allied side, and sought to take over at least one French place in Dauphiné. Amadeus's hectic preparations for war and his negotiations for financial assistance from England and Spain, were followed by a declaration of war against France on 4 June.

== Battle ==
The 1690 Italian Campaign; key locations

In July Catinat took command of French forces in Piedmont, totalling some 12,000 men, while Victor Amadeus received 10,000 Spanish reinforcements from Milan, and was also promised 5,000 Imperial troops led by his cousin, Prince Eugene of Savoy. Additionally, Amadeus's Protestant community, the Vaudois, who had previously suffered religious persecution from Louis XIV and Amadeus alike, had since become reconciled with their Duke, and took up arms in defence of their valleys. Little quarter was asked or given when fighting the French.

Determined to punish Amadeus, Louis XIV had ordered Catinat to use his force to burn and tax (put under contribution) large tracts of parts of Savoy and the Plain of Piedmont – attempts by local peasants to retaliate were met by hanging anyone who was found carrying arms. However, the Marquis de Feuquieres, sent by Catinat with 1,200 troops to Luserna, suffered a major setback and was forced to abandon the town with the loss of some 600 men.

While Catinat's army manoeuvred on the Piedmontese plain Marquis de Saint-Ruth took most of the exposed Duchy of Savoy, routing the Savoyard forces; only the great fortress of Montmélian, less than 60 km north of Grenoble, remained in ducal hands. Although Savoy was far less important than Piedmont, its loss was a major setback for the Grand Alliance, making an invasion of France now much less likely. In a desperate attempt to halt the destruction and intimidation Amadeus – against the advice of Eugene – insisted on engaging the French with his own and Spanish troops. Believing that Feuquieres was lost, and anxious to catch the French whilst they were weak, Amadeus left his camp at Villafranca with the intention of attacking and surrounding Catinat.

Catinat left his camp at Cavour and marched south with the intention of taking Saluzzo; when Amadeus moved to stop him, the result was the engagement at the abbey of Staffarda on 18 August. Marshes and hedges impeded movement on the battlefield and sheltered the Savoyard line, but French troops eventually broke the Savoyard army. Only Prince Eugene's command of the Savoyard cavalry and his conduct in retreat saved the Allied army from disaster. Amadeus suffered 2,800 casualties and 1,200 prisoners; he also lost 11 of his 12 cannon. Catinat's casualties amount to between 1,000 and 2,000 troops.

== Aftermath ==
Catinat subsequently took Saluzzo, Savigliano and Fossano, levying supplies and taxes from the occupied areas; towns that refused to pay, like Ceresole and Autrive were looted. When Imperial troops finally arrived in Piedmont little could be achieved, allegedly due to Spanish reluctance to support Victor Amadeus, their long-time rival for dominance in Northern Italy, with Prince Eugene claiming "they want to do absolutely nothing." Instead, he confined himself to small raids carried out by his cavalry, many of whom were used to the brutality of the Turkish wars; during one such episode in September 1690, they reportedly castrated 200 French prisoners before killing them.

Catinat proceeded to Susa, a vital fortress controlling communications with Briançon in the Dauphiné, opening trenches there on 11 November. The stronghold capitulated two days later, but hopes of taking Turin then capturing the Asti region and south-east Piedmont in order to link up with Casale had to be scaled back due to supply and communication problems, manning shortages, and sickness within the army. Unable to live off the resources of a devastated Piedmont, the French took up winter quarters in Savoy, the Dauphiné, and Provence. The Imperial troops based themselves in Montferrat, much to the consternation of its pro-French ruler, the Duke of Mantua.

== Sources ==
- Chandler, David G (1990). The Art of Warfare in the Age of Marlborough. Spellmount Limited. ISBN 0-946771-42-1.
- Henderson, Nicholas (1966). Prince Eugene of Savoy. Weidenfeld & Nicolson. ISBN 1-84212-597-4.
- Lynn, John A (1999). The Wars of Louis XIV, 1667–1714. Longman. ISBN 0-582-05629-2.
- McKay, Derek (1977). Prince Eugene of Savoy. Thames & Hudson Ltd. ISBN 0-500-87007-1.
- McKay, Derek & Scott, H. M (1984). The Rise of the Great Powers 1648–1815. Longman. ISBN 0-582-48554-1
- Rowlands, Guy (2000). "Louis XIV, Vittorio Amedeo II and French Military Failure in Italy, 1689–96". The English Historical Review. 115 (462): 534–569. doi:10.1093/ehr/115.462.534. JSTOR 579666.
- Storrs, Christopher (1999). War, Diplomacy and the Rise of Savoy, 1690–1720. Cambridge University Press. ISBN 0-521-55146-3.
