= Compagnie d'ordonnance =

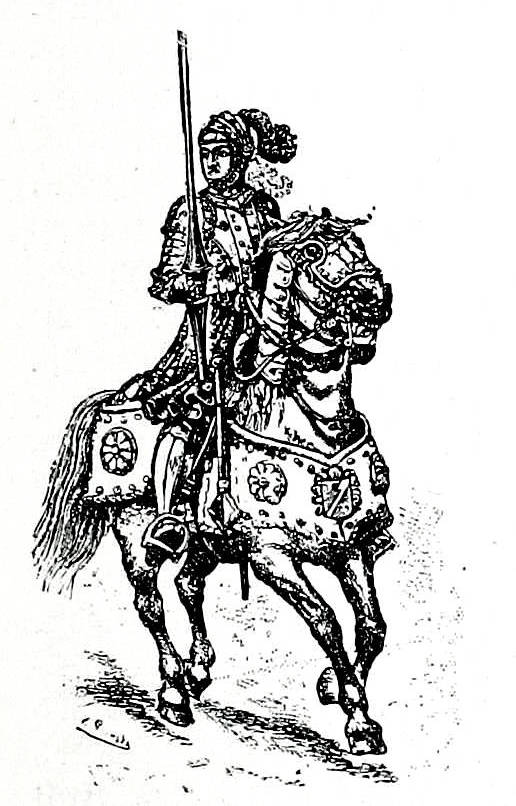
- Active: 2 November 1439 – 17th century
- Country: Kingdom of France
- Type: Heavy cavalry Light cavalry Light infantry Archer; Crossbowmen
- Role: Standing army
- Size: 9,000 (1445); 10,800 (1461); 24,000 (1483); 15,000 (1485); 19,200 (1490)

The compagnie d'ordonnance was the first standing army of late medieval and early modern France. The system was the forefather of the modern company. Each compagnie consisted of 100 lances fournies, which was built around a heavily armed and armored gendarme (heavy cavalryman), with assisting pages or squires, archers and men-at-arms, for a total of 600 men. By 1445, France had 15 compagnies, for an army of 9,000 men, of which 6,000 were combatants and 3,000 non-combatants. Over the course of the 15th century, the compagnies d'ordonnance expanded to a peak strength of 58 compagnies of 4,000 lances and 24,000 men in 1483. It was later supplemented by the bandes d'artillerie, the franc-archers militia after 1448 and standing infantry regiments (bandes d'infanterie) from 1480 onward.

The compagnies d'ordonnance were replaced by the gendarmerie system in the 17th century.

== History ==
In the 14th and early 15th century bands of mercenaries, whose contracts with their masters had expired, were the scourge of medieval France. French success in the Caroline war had been largely driven by a professional standing army that Charles V had been able to create and finance in the aftermath of the disastrous experience with the mercenary routiers who had pillaged much of the country after the 1360 peace. This force, the first standing army in post-Roman western Europe, had been disbanded in the tumultuous regency period after 1380. In the late 1430s, with the Hundred Years' War going through one of its quieter periods, unemployed mercenaries from the Anglo-Burgundian armies were allowed to pillage. Eventually some were recruited by French mercenary captains who hired them out to the royal companies raised by order of the King, who it seems regarded the Écorcheurs as a major impediment to peaceful rule. These free companies were primarily composed of Gascons, Spaniards, Bretons, Flemish, and Germans. They extorted protection money from local peasants as well as exacting tolls from passing merchants and holding local important people for ransom.

In 1439 the French legislature, known as the Estates General (French: états généraux), passed laws that restricted military recruitment and training to the king alone. There was a new tax to be raised known as the taille that was to provide funding for a new Royal army. The mercenary companies were given a choice of either joining the Royal army as compagnies d'ordonnance on a permanent basis, or being hunted down and destroyed if they refused. The newly established force greatly resembled the army previously created by Charles V. France gained a total standing army of around 6,000 men, which was sent out to gradually eliminate the remaining mercenaries who insisted on operating on their own. The reforms of the 1440s eventually led to the French victory at Castillon in 1453 and the conclusion of the Hundred Years' War. The origins of this name is often attributed to the order or "ordenance", act of arranging, by the King of France Charles VII in 1447 for a permanent standing army. By 1450 the companies were divided into the field army, known as the grande ordonnance and the garrison force known as the petite ordonnance. In addition to these companies, French kings still called upon men at arms and footmen in the traditional way by calling the arriere-ban, in other words, a general levy where all able-bodied males age 15 to 60 living in the Kingdom of France were summoned to go to war by the King. Furthermore, there existed throughout the kingdom countless garrisons of royal soldiers in towns, cities, castles and fortresses which were summoned to go to battle as in previous centuries; however their importance was not the same as that of the ordonnance men.

While traditional historiography has force comprising 20 compagnies of 100 lances each, this is not the case, and is a later (even folk-historical) assessment. Adding to the murky historiography associated with this development, it seems pretty clear that there was not a single Grande Ordonnance, but rather two dozen or more, published simultaneously (or nearly so) across France. Each of those localized simultaneous versions applied only to the immediate area and its assigned force, but was otherwise identical to in terms of regulations, guidelines for recruitment, and so forth. Accordingly, the size of companies varied, and individual companies contained anywhere from 30 to 100 lances, depending on the defense and security requirements of the region where the troops were stationed. Prior to this legislation, the French depended on a haphazard mixture of volunteers, mercenaries, and feudal levies, of very mixed capabilities and reputations. Worse, many of these fighters were essentially freebooters, more interested in larceny or brigandage than in actually defending France. The Grande Ordonnance, in whatever form it took, was a coherent, centralized effort to place the defense of the realm in the hands of a reliable force, whose senior officers were (as direct appointees of the crown) loyal to the French monarchy, and dependent on it for supplies, pay, and support.

Each lance (properly a lance fournie or 'furnished' or 'equipped lance') contained, as contemporary sources put it, six horses and four men. Actually, each lance contained six personnel, each with a horse, but only four of them were counted as combat personnel. The senior member was a man-at-arms (gen d'armes in French, plural gens d'armes or gendarmerie as a collective noun). This man was supported by a squire (ecuyer or coutillier), usually a younger man still undergoing his apprenticeship to arms, or not yet fully proved in battle. The man-at-arms and squire were further assisted by a page, or valet de guerre, usually a teenage male, who was responsible for caring for their armour, equipment, and horses. The squire was generally fully armoured, and usually charged alongside (or close by) the man-at-arms, and helped him handle the sixteen- to nineteen-foot lance when they fought dismounted (which initially happened fairly often).

The lance further contained two archers, who were at first considered mounted infantrymen, provided with horses for mobility alone, but not for battlefield operations. Some were apparently equipped with bows and arrows, others with crossbows, and all also carried swords or axes and some armour, if usually less than the man-at-arms and the squire. As time went on, their role became increasingly difficult to distinguish from that of the other two combat soldiers. Archers of the Ordonnances officially became armed with the lance in Henri II's ordinance in 1549. In his famous Commentaires, the sixteenth-century soldier Blaise de Monluc noted that he had joined the army as an archer in the compagnies about 1521, but "since then everything had become degraded," and the old standards no longer applied. Monluc wrote his Commentaires in semi-retirement in the late 1560s, more than a century after the institution was created, so his assessment may well have been correct. Initially though, the archers also shared the support and assistance of their own page or valet de guerre, whose role was to provide them with the same assistance as the other such individual provided to the man-at-arms and squire.

Most men-at-arms and squires were drawn from the landowning gentry and aristocracy, although not necessarily titled nobility. This tendency became more pronounced as time went on, and the companies gradually grew more 'aristocratic' in character. The archers were more typically commoners at first, in part to integrate the considerable pool of experienced soldiers who were not gentry or aristocracy, into the framework of the new army. The men-at-arms and squire were both mounted on heavy war-horses (destriers), and full-equipped with plate armour and visored helmet. The archers were generally less well-armoured, and typically mounted on decent riding horses. They were not at first expected to engage in mounted combat, but that distinction later faded, and the archers became nearly indistinguishable from the man-at-arms, as did the squire. As non-combatants, the two pages were not generally armoured, and armed only with a dagger or small sword for personal protection. The pages' horses, like those of the archers, were not warhorses. The status of the pages remained largely unchanged throughout the development of the compagnies d'ordonnance.

This professional army was supported by a new class of militia, the "Free Archers" Francs-Archers, following the edict of 28 April 1448 by the same King. The francs-archers were not paid, but were exempt from paying the taille in recognition of their service. As volunteers and part-time soldiers, they were often drawn from the military fraternities which existed at the time in many French municipalities. Such fraternities also existed across much of northern and central Italy, in parts of Spain and the Low Countries, and even in some areas of Germany. As a militia, their standards of equipment and training were very uneven, and despite some earnest effort, the francs-archers never enjoyed much success as a military force.
