= Jean de Bourbon, Count of Enghien =

French soldier and prince du sang (1528–1557)

Jean de Bourbon
- Comte d'Enghien; Comte de Soissons
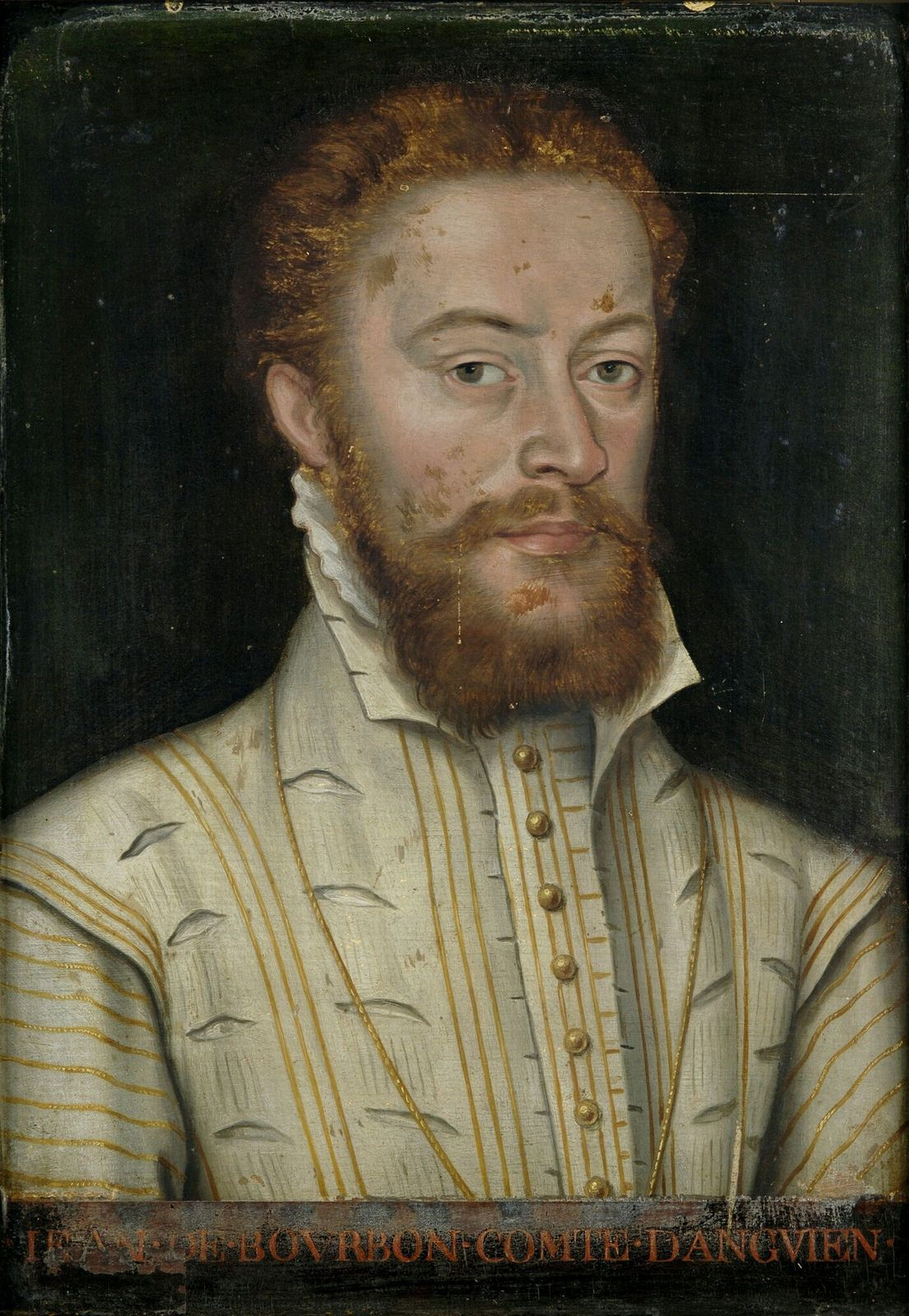
- Portrait of Jean de Bourbon
- Born: 6 July 1528
- Died: 10 August 1557 (aged 29); Saint-Quentin
- House: Bourbon-Vendôme
- Father: Charles de Bourbon, duc de Vendôme
- Mother: Françoise d'Alençon

Jean de Bourbon, comte d'Enghien and comte de Soissons (6 July 1528 – 10 August 1557) was a French prince du sang and military commander during the latter Italian Wars of the French king Henri II. The son of Charles de Bourbon, duc de Vendôme (duke of Vendôme) and Françoise d'Alençon, Jean had several older brothers. After the death of his elder brother François de Bourbon, comte d'Enghien (count of Enghien), Jean inherited the title, by which he would be known to posterity.

Enghien enjoyed a ceremonial role in the early reign of Henri II, he was not however afforded much in the way of offices or titles by the crown. For the conclusion of peace with the English in 1550, he was made a hostage as guarantor of French payments to England. With the resumption of the Italian Wars in 1551, Enghien participated in the war of Parma at the siege of Lanzo. He then saw service in the successful defence of French controlled Metz in 1552, against a siege led by the Holy Roman Emperor Charles V. Come 1555, Enghien was back in Italy, and participated in the successful capture of Volpiano. Sometime in 1557 he married his first cousin Marie de Bourbon, and shortly thereafter died in the disastrous French defeat of the battle of Saint-Quentin on 10 August 1557.

== Personal life and family ==
=== Family ===
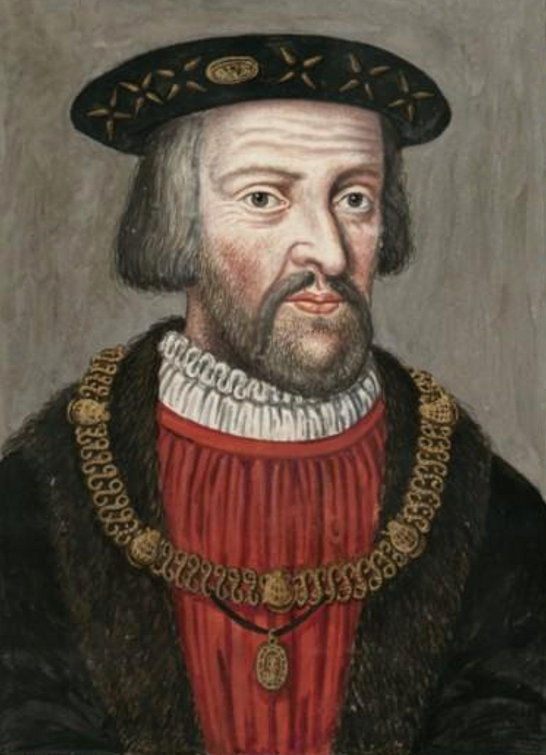
Charles de Bourbon, duc de Vendôme, father to Jean de Bourbon

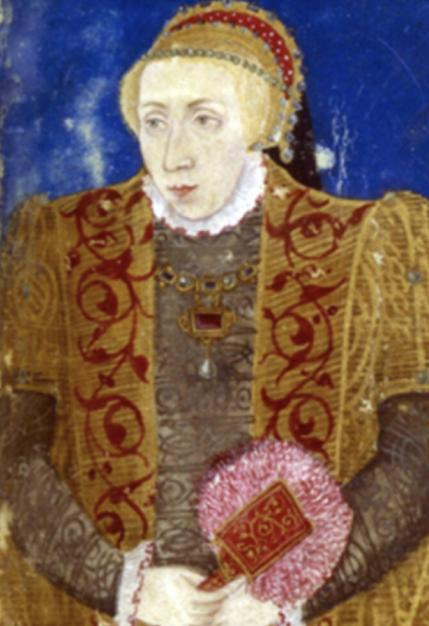
Marie de Luxembourg, paternal grandmother to Jean de Bourbon, and owner of the territories of Enghien and Soissons

Jean de Bourbon was born on 6 July 1528, the son of Charles de Bourbon, duc de Vendôme (duke of Vendôme) and Françoise d'Alençon. Jean's father Charles de Bourbon was a prince du sang (prince of the royal blood), by virtue of his descent from the sixth son of king Louis IX, Robert Capet, comte de Clermont (count of Clermont). By this descent, Jean de Bourbon was a cadet member of the royal house through the male line. Jean's mother, Françoise d'Alençon brought various lands to the marriage. Together this couple had thirteen children.

Among Jean's brothers were the eldest Antoine de Bourbon, who would succeed their father as duc de Vendôme, and then, by his 1548 marriage, become king of Navarre in 1555. Another brother of Jean's of note was François de Bourbon, comte d'Enghien, who achieved a famous triumph at the battle of Ceresole in 1544 and to whom Jean would succeed in titles. Finally, of note for Jean's life among his brothers was Louis de Bourbon, prince de Condé with whom Jean would collaborate in many military escapades in the 1550s.

In 1528, the seigneur d'Humières was established as godfather to the new-born Jean de Bourbon.^{α}

=== Marriage ===
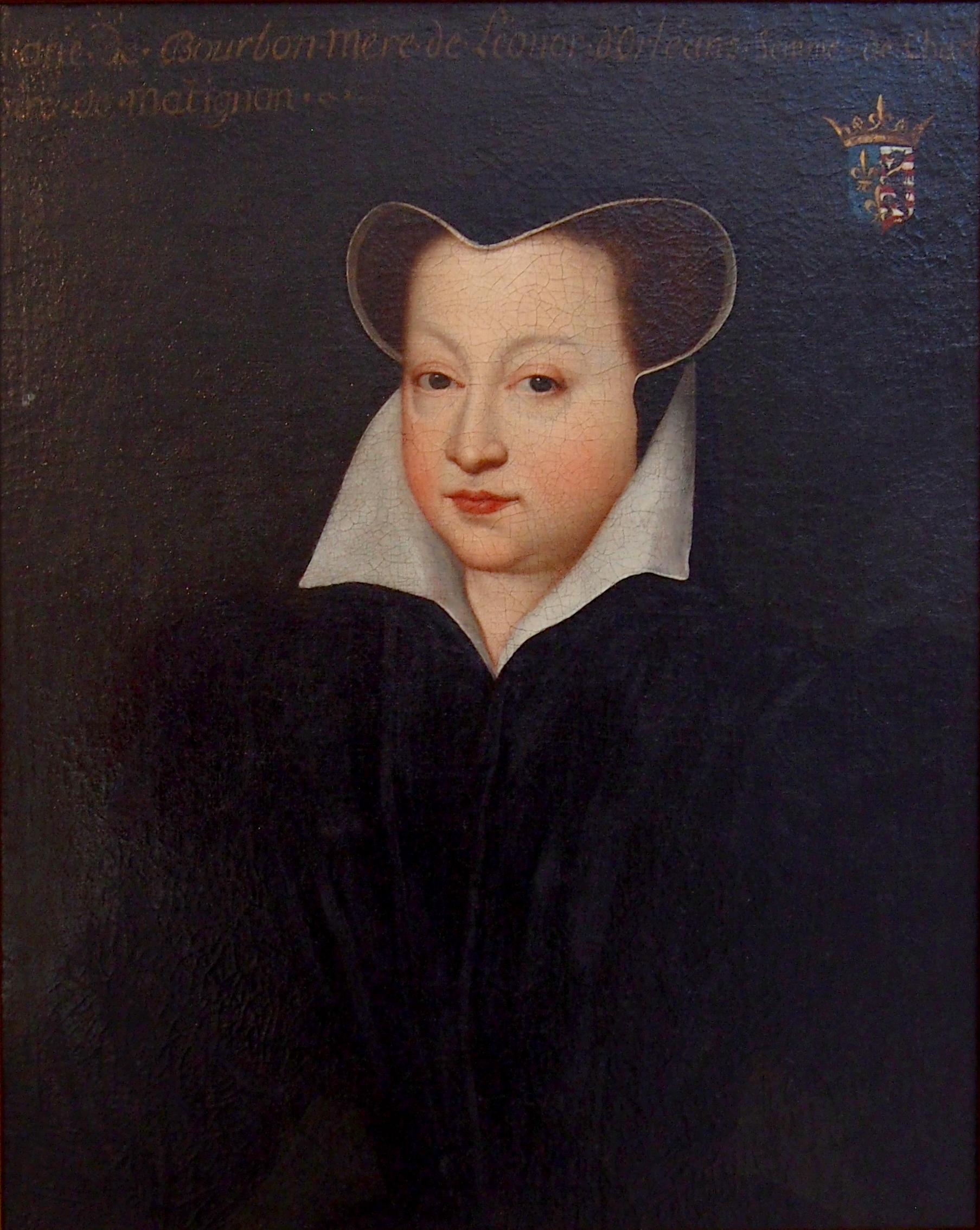
Marie de Bourbon, duchesse d'Estouteville and comtesse de Saint-Pol, first cousin of Jean de Bourbon and briefly his wife

Jean de Bourbon married his first cousin, Marie de Bourbon, duchesse d'Estouteville and comtesse de Saint-Pol daughter of Jean's paternal uncle François de Bourbon, comte de Saint-Pol. This marriage was celebrated on 14 June 1557, shortly before Jean de Bourbon's death at Saint-Quentin. The couple would have no issue.

After Jean's death, Marie remarried. Her second marriage transpired three years later in 1560 with the elderly François I de Clèves, duc de Nevers.

=== Luxembourg inheritance ===
In 1546, Jean's grandmother, Marie de Luxembourg died. Her inheritance was now a matter of partage. By the terms of the attendant partage, in 1549, Jean received 4,000 livres per year. With the division of Marie's plate, Jean was granted 32 marcs of silver. Jean's eldest brother, the duc de Vendôme had responsibility for ensuring that his younger brothers Jean and Louis were territorially satisfied. From his deceased elder brother François, Jean inherited the comté (county) d'Enghien. Meanwhile, the duc de Vendôme was to provided the comté de Soissons by the duc de Vendôme. Jean will be referred to as the comte d'Enghien for the remainder of this article.

The territory of Enghien was to be found in the Belgian province of Hainaut It was a contested territory at the north-western extremity of the Holy Roman Empire and therefore was sometimes under Imperial occupation. This was the case before the convention of La Fère in October 1538.

=== Compagnie d'Ordonnance ===
Jean de Bourbon enjoyed command of a compagnie d'ordonnance (the heavy cavalry core of the French army). A certain captain of the Bourbon château de Vendeuil, François de Stavaye would serve as the lieutenant of Jean's compagnie.

=== Childhood ===
In his youth, Jean de Bourbon, and his elder brother François de Bourbon, jointly lived in the household of their uncle, François de Bourbon, comte de Saint-Pol.

== New King, little favour ==
On 31 March 1547, King Francis I died. The comte d'Enghien (count of Enghien) was among those in the funeral processions for the King. He wore a Moiré cloak like the other princes and peers of France.

The beginning of the reign of Francis' son, who now styled himself Henri II, was the occasion of a palace revolution. The duchesse d'Étampes and all her supporters were ousted. Though many vacancies were generated in this process, Henri did not grant them to the princes du sang like Enghien or his elder brother the duc de Vendôme, favouring instead his familiars. Cloulas describes the spurning of these men, in favour of 'newcomers' as scandalous. Alongside the Bourbon family in being spurned, was to be found the house of Albret who were felt to be too close to the duchesse d'Étampes.

One of the great beneficiaries of the palace revolution was Diane de Poitiers. She spread the favour that had been bestowed upon her by granting those lands whose heir was unknown to the duc d'Aumale (a member of the sovereign house of Lorraine-Guise. He in turn, passed on the privilege to the comte d'Enghien. By this means, Diane became a patron to both the Lorraine-Guise family, and the Bourbon family.

On the day the mourning for Francis I was due to end, 29 May, the new King convened a meeting of the Order of Saint-Michel. This order, created by Louis XI in the prior century was the pre-eminent royal chivalric order. In part due to the preceding palace revolution, a reorganisation of the order was necessary. Several new knights of the order were thus created: the comte d'Enghien, the marquis de Mayenne, the vicomte de Rohan (viscount of Rohan), the baron de Sérignan, and the seigneur de Saint-André (lord of Saint-André) who was simultaneously made a maréchal de France (Marshal of France - great officer of the crown and senior military commander).

=== Coronation and ceremony ===
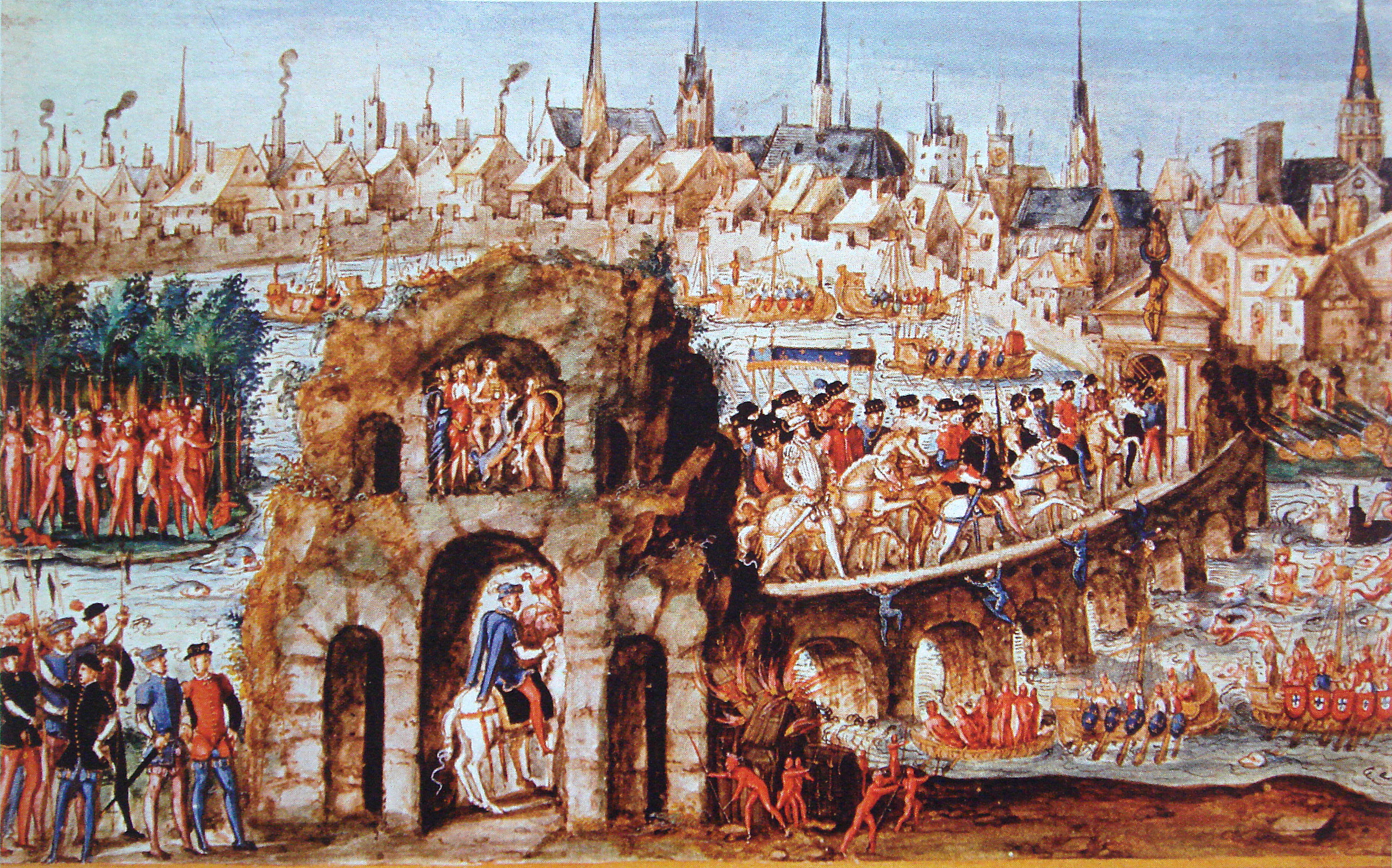
Royal Entry into Rouen in 1550

Come 20 July 1547, Henri was ready to depart for his coronation. The new King met with a delegation from Reims (where he was to be crowned) at the nearby village of La Myre. With the King for the occasion were the constable de Montmorency, the king of Navarre, the duc de Lorraine, the duc de Vendôme (Enghien's elder brother) and the comte d'Enghien among others. The royal party entered Reims on 25 July to receive a Joyous Entry (a special ceremonial first entry into a city). The following day, the king undertook his coronation at the Cathedral of Reims.

The governor of the Lyonnais, the maréchal de Saint-André resolved to undertake a Joyous Entry into the capital of his governate, Lyon. This aroused opposition from the grandees of the city who argued such entries were not a prerogative of governors, but rather the King and Queen, as well as princes du sang. Saint-André assured the grandees of Lyon that he would in fact be accompanied by four princes on his journey, including two princes du sang: the comte d'Enghien and the prince de La Roche-sur-Yon. The city therefore resigned itself to facilitating Saint-André's expensive Entry.

The coronation of the French queen, Catherine took place on 10 June 1549. Around 11:00 on the day of the coronation, Catherine was fetched from the abbey of Saint-Denis by the cardinal de Vendôme and cardinal de Guise, so that she might be accompanied to the great church for her crowning. Around them were to be found a host of princes, princesses and office holders. The comte d'Enghien and his elder brother the duc de Vendôme enjoyed the responsibility of holding the hem of Catherine's mantle. During the ceremony itself, Enghien, Vendôme and the cardinal de Bourbon (one of their uncles) jointly held the crown above Catherine's head after she had received her anointment.

=== Conclusion of the English war ===
Around November 1549, the comte d'Enghien had his compagnie of 50 lances (heavy cavalry unit, each one comprising a gendarme heavy cavalryman wielding a lance as well as several other soldiers) garrisoned with him in the city of Saint-Quentin in Picardy.

Peace between England and France was signed on 24 March 1550. As part of this peace, the English withdrew from the city of Boulogne, which they had held since 1544. The French, for their part, were to pay the English a sum of money. Until the full sum had been paid, six hostages were to be sent to England as security. These were the comte d'Enghien, the marquis de Mayenne, the elder son of the constable de Montmorency, François, the vicomte de Thouars, the vidame de Chartres and the seigneur de La Hunaudaie.

On 1 October 1550, Henri celebrated his 'victory over the English' in the form of a triumph in the city of Rouen. The King's household preceded him into the city, among them the great officers of the crown. Before the King came the constable de Montmorency with the Constable's sword drawn, the duc de Guise (formally known as the duc d'Aumale), the comte d'Enghien, Enghien's younger brother the prince de Condé and many others. Cloulas finds it notable that the King's two great favourites (Guise and Montmorency) walked before the princes du sang Enghien and Condé. A spectacle had been prepared for the royal party, featuring the daily life of the Tupinambá people of Brazil, a region in which France had interests. After the conclusion of his 'triumph' Henri went, on 8 October, to administer justice in the parlement of Rouen. With him went the comte d'Enghien, the king of Navarre, the duc de Guise, the duc d'Aumale (formerly the marquis de Mayenne), the constable de Montmorency and the various cardinals.

== Resumption of the Italian wars ==
=== Parma war ===
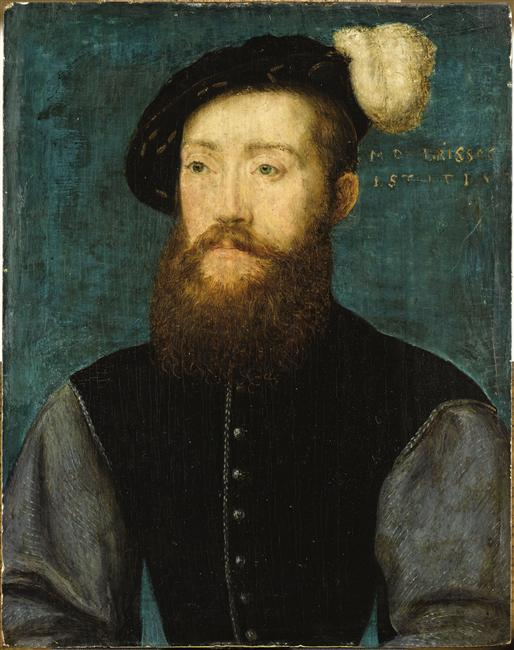
Charles de Cossé, comte de Brissac, leading French military commander in the Italian peninsula

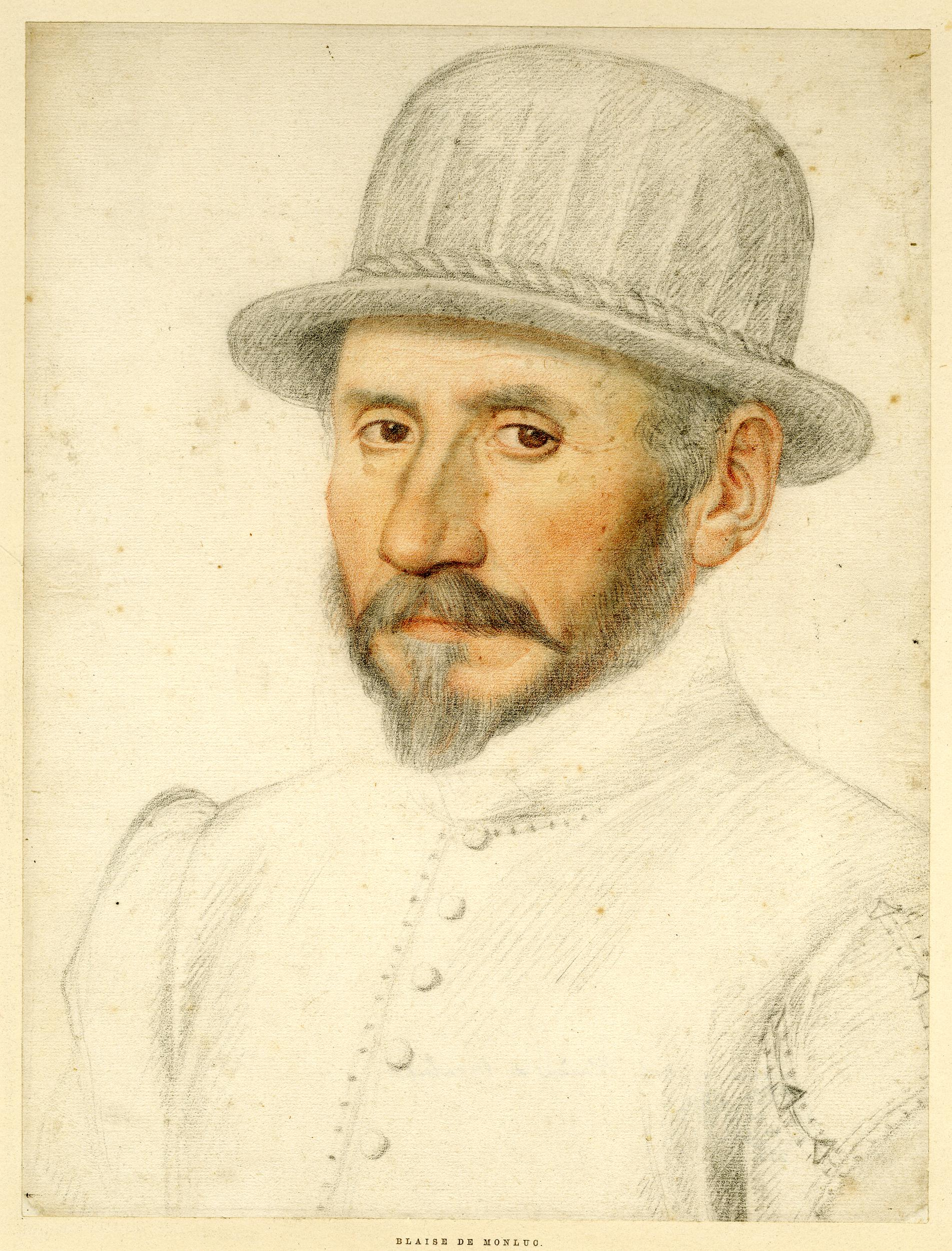
Seigneur de Monluc, with whom several of Enghien's military escapades during the 1550s in Italy would be associated

After the death of Pope Paul III, the Holy Roman Emperor Charles V no longer saw why he should offer a friendly face to the Farnese family. He therefore demanded the duke of Parma yield his duchy of Parma. In May 1551, the duke of Parma, entered into compact with the French king Henri II. No sooner had this been done, that his lands were invaded by the Papacy and Imperial (i.e. Holy Roman) parties. The Imperial army that laid siege to Parma was under the command of the condotierri (a type of Italian contract mercenary) Ferrante Gonzaga. With the Imperials bogged down before Parma, the French commander the comte de Brissac launched attacks on San Damiano, Cherasco and Chieri near Turin. San Damiano was poorly defended and easily taken. Cherasco was hotly defended, and the assault failed. Though the assault on Chieri also failed, a siege brought success, and the city was surrendered by composition on 5 September. Brissac also succeeded in surprising the entourage of the archduke of Austria and his wife Maria near Asti, taking many dead and prisoners. Appraised of the fall of Chieri and San Damiano, which risked compromising his western front, Gonzaga made for Asti with 6,000 men, leaving a subordinate in front of the city of Parma. Henri II meanwhile funnelled reinforcements to Brissac, dispatching six companies of lances. As had happened before the battle of Ceresole, the victory of Enghien's eponymous elder brother in 1544, many young nobles hungry for battle descended on Italy to join with Brissac as part of these reinforcements. In Cloulas' estimation, they were attracted to the theatre by Brissac's easy surprise of the royal entourage. Among them was the new comte d'Enghien; as well as his younger brother, the prince de Condé; the eldest son of the constable de Montmorency, and the comte de Charny.

These prestigious new arrivals were welcomed by the seigneur de Monluc, who ensured they were armed and horsed, as well as offering to educate them in the art of war. Brissac looked to put his new arrivals to work with the capture of Lanzo near Turin. Through Lanzo's capture, control of Turin would be more assured. However, arriving before Lanzo, Brissac determined the place impregnable. Monluc took umbrage with this. Monluc, in alliance with the young nobles, like the comte d'Enghien, who in their inexperience were hungry for battle, succeeded in overturning Brissac's objection to the capture of Lanzo. The village of Lanzo was taken with ease, it being the castle which was the great challenge. Having spotted an advantageous hill where cannons might be sited, the process of placing them in this overlook was then undertaken. Each of the four cannons was assigned to one of the great nobles in the army, who during the night were responsible for the lifting of the cannon up the heights. The cannons were sited, and the bombardment began in the morning of 29 September. After only three hours, the fortress capitulated. Sournia notes that the role of the garrison being unpaid.

After the capture of Lanzo, Brissac retired to Turin. Now of the opinion there was no great showdown to come between the French and Imperial armies in Italy, in addition to the coming prospect of a royal campaign in Alsace and the eastern French frontier, the young nobles departed the peninsula back to France, nevertheless proud of what had been accomplished at Lanzo.

=== Metz campaign ===
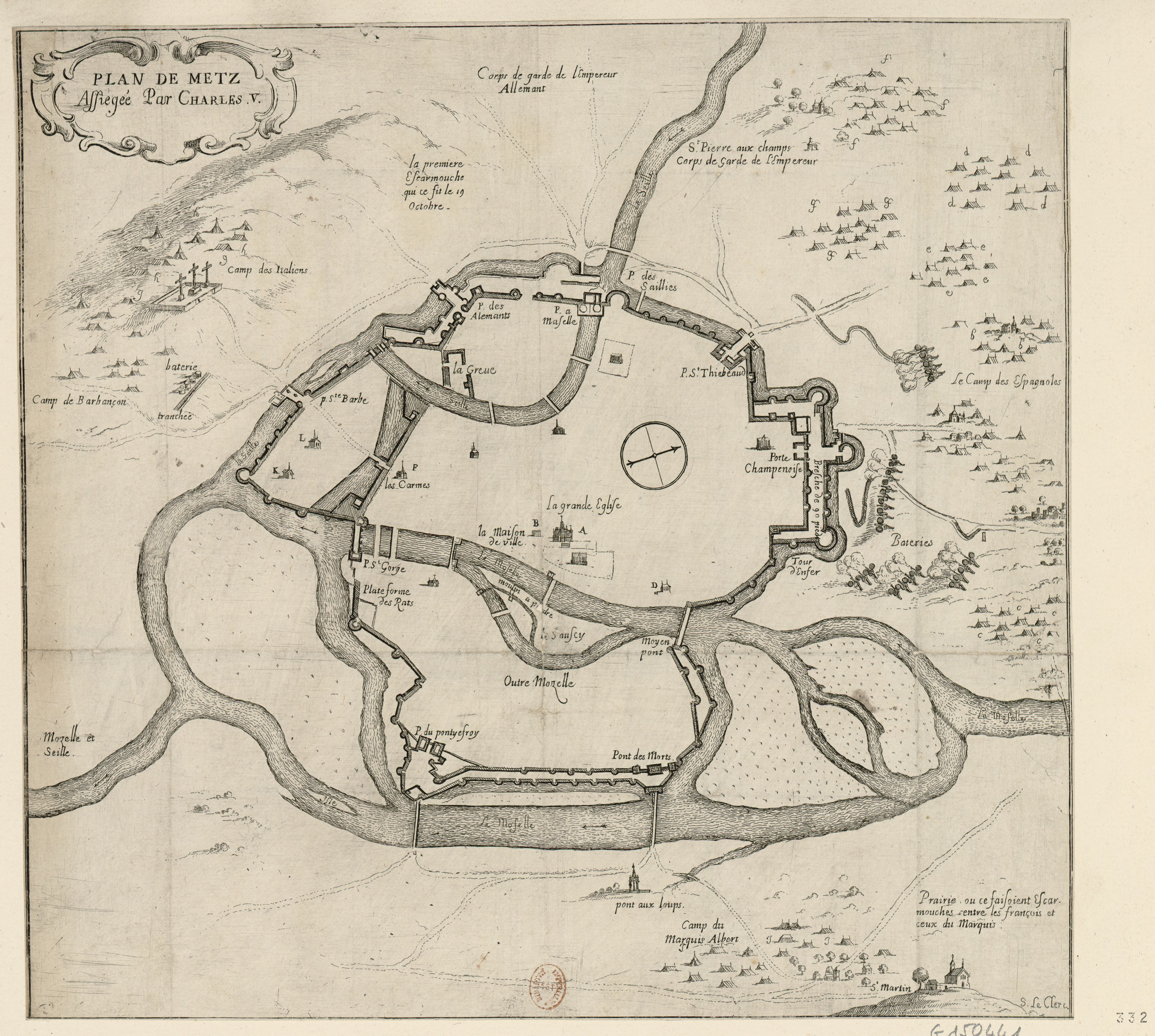
Metz during the siege, the area of the walls over which Enghien and the prince de Condé were responsible is in the top right of this image

The royal army struck eastwards into Alsace in two bodies. One was led by the duc de Guise and the king Henri II. The other was led by the constable de Montmorency. Guise and Henri descended upon Toul, and then Nancy. Montmorency gained entry to Metz via a degree of subterfuge. It was at Metz that the royal army re-unified and marched forward to Strasbourg. Suspicious of Montmorency after his trickery at Metz, the army was refused entry to Strasbourg and it soon began to retreat westwards, capturing Montmédy, Bouillon and Verdun.

During this time, an Imperial counterstroke was lacking. The emperor Charles V was ill. Come the Autumn, he was ready, and he put the city of Metz to siege. During the intervening period, the duc de Guise had enjoyed the opportunity to reinforce the city. The city had become a magnet for the young nobility, keen to undertake a feat of arms. The comte d'Enghien was among those to be found in Metz, along with his brother the prince de Condé, the duc de Guise's brother the marquis d'Elbeuf and several relatives of the constable de Montmorency. To channel the excitable energies of the great nobility, the duc de Guise allocated various sections of the walls to the leading families of the kingdom. Enghien and Condé held responsibility for the walls from the Saint-Thiébault gate to the river Seille.

Come mid-November, Metz was menaced by three separate Imperial armies. To the north of the city, the army of the queen of Hungary, to the south that of the duke of Alba and finally in the south-west the army of the margrave of Brandenburg. Nevertheless, Guise was in good spirits as to his defensive prospects for the city, and bid Henri II allow the royal army to pursue objectives elsewhere.

The besieging armies succeeded in opening breaches in Metz's walls. However, the defenders were quickly able to see these defects closed. In the Imperial camp, disease spread and the weather soured. Come 1 January 1553, Charles V resolved to abandon the siege of Metz.

=== Volpiano ===
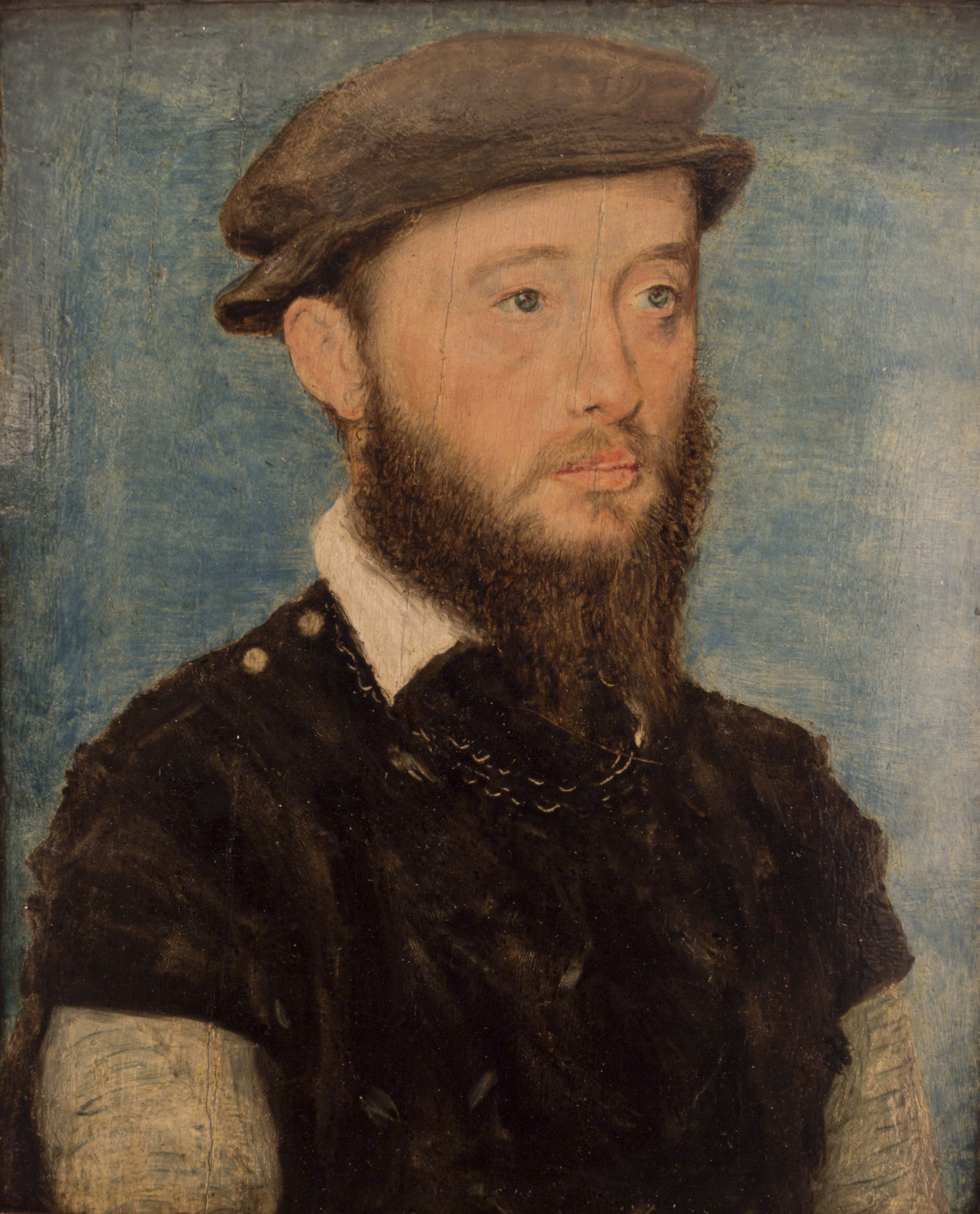
Comte d'Enghien

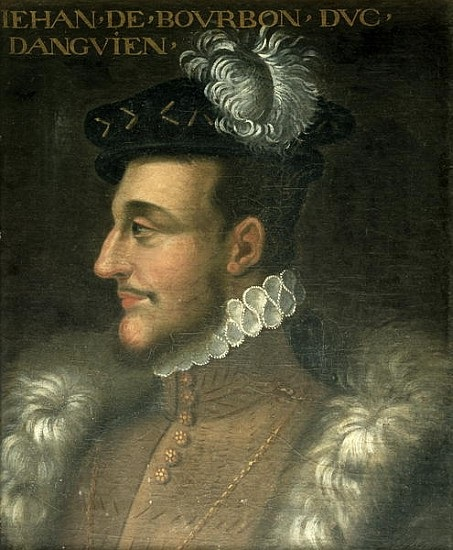
Comte d'Enghien

As the end of 1554 approached, the French commander in Italy, the comte de Brissac now faced a new Imperial opponent, Gómez Suárez de Figueroa who took little initiative. Therefore, Brissac looked to assume the offensive. In December 1544 he captured Ivrea, and followed this with the capture of Casale in March 1555. By these measures, Montferrat was secure and the Po Valley opened to the French. Come June, Figueroa was replaced in the Imperial command by the duke of Alba, who enjoyed a far more fearsome reputation. Alba looked to compromise the recent French conquests with a siege of Santhià, which was a challenge Brissac had to respond to. The comte de Brissac requested of Henri II that new troops be provided to him, so that he might confront Alba. Henri obliged the request, proffering 5,000 Swiss soldiers (a renowned type of mercenary) and 5,000 Gascons. Meanwhile, Alba faced stiff resistance in Santhià, and conscious of Brissac's reinforcements, was forced to withdraw from the siege in August. His hands freed, Brissac resolved to clean up the Imperial enclave of Volpiano on the outskirts of Turin. Command of the siege of Volpiano fell to the young duc d'Aumale. Aumale collaborated in command of the siege with the older veteran seigneur de Monluc. The besiegers were joined, as had happened in 1552, by the young and great nobility eager for battle. From Paris came the comte d'Enghien, the prince de Condé, and the duc de Nemours among others. These men had no formal position of command in the army they were joining, simply coming so that they might fight.

The siege of Volpiano began on 3 September. The first attempted assault was a disaster. Brissac, annoyed that his orders concerning the siege had been violated, reprimanded Aumale for the debacle. Nevertheless, the duke of Alba was concerned for the fate of Volpiano, and looked to send four companies of infantry and another four of cavalry into the city to stiffen the defence of the place against the French. Monluc, Enghien, Condé and Nemours succeeded in intercepting this attempted reinforcement column. As a result of this success, only 200 men made it into Volpiano. An assault was launched by which artillery breached the ramparts. The French succeeded in capturing two fortification works. Brissac arrived at the siege lines on 19 September. The day that followed Volpiano surrendered to the French. The castle of Volpiano held out four days more, before it too surrendered.

Brissac made it clear to Henri II that he was medically incapable in continuing his role as the King's lieutenant-général in Piedmont. The rumour spread, to the horror of the young lords of the French army in Italy, that he was to be replaced by the elderly seigneur de Thermes. They rebuked this possibility, of the opinion a man of a 'mediocre family' like Thermes was not worthy of a post, which should go instead to the duc d'Aumale. Sournia views the objections to Thermes as ultimately being short-sighted, arguing Thermes had far more experience, and Aumale lacked the authority with the soldiery that Thermes enjoyed. Monluc became associated with this movement towards Aumale's command, though his exact role is unclear. Montmorency, as constable of France (and thus chief of the French military), was uninterested in the desires of these young nobles to see one of their own established to this key posting. Thermes was appointed to the charge, and Montmorency had Enghien and Condé lightly reprimanded for their role in the affair.

At some point in 1555, the comte d'Enghien and the prince de Condé paid a visit to Geneva, which was now dominated by the Protestant theologian Calvin, where they enjoyed a warm welcome.

=== Saint-Quentin ===
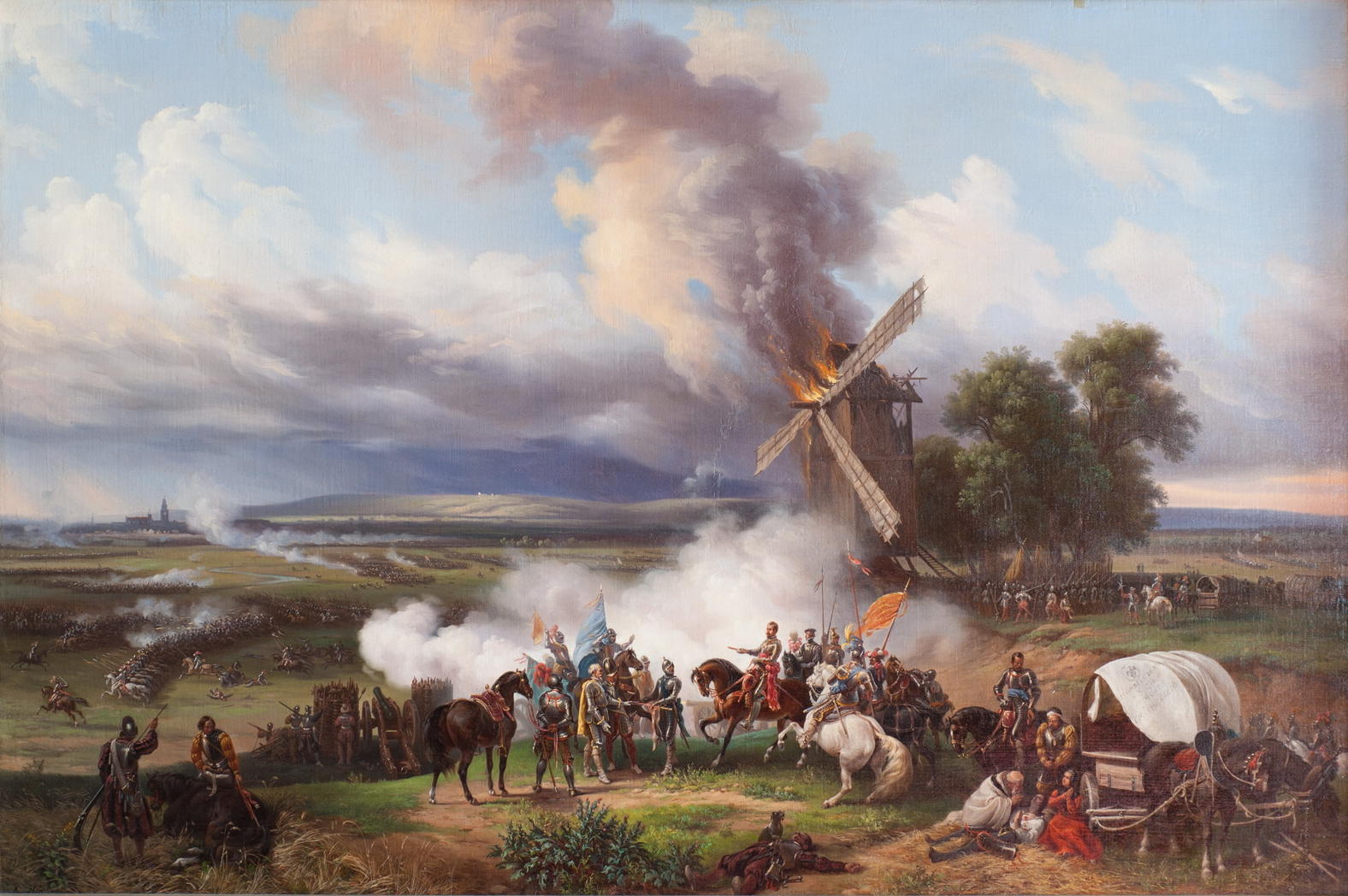
Aftermath of the Spanish victory at the battle of Saint-Quentin

With an army under the Spanish king Philip II, numbering perhaps around 47,000 men skulking around on the north-east French frontier, the constable de Montmorency was dispatched to take command in the theatre on 28 July 1557. All the noble soldiers of the court left with him to join the army. The French were significantly outnumbered in Picardy, boasting between 22,000 and 24,000 soldiers.

The French were misled as to the intentions of the Spanish army, falsely believing it looked to strike eastwards. Rather, its commander, the duke of Savoy hoped to plunge into Picardy. On 1 August, several companies of the Spanish army appeared before Saint-Quentin, hoping to seize the place by surprise. This was not successful. With Montmorency hurrying to dispatch units to reinforce Saint-Quentin, the duke of Savoy looked to undertake a proper siege. Henri II informed Montmorency of the importance of holding Saint-Quentin. Woefully outnumbered, Baumgartner imagines he had no intention of offering battle to Savoy, and rather hoped to sneak a further party of reinforcements into the city. The reinforcements, under the command of the seigneur d'Andelot were rebuffed by the Spanish on 4 August and 10 August. With the failure of the 10 August reinforcement effort, Montmorency looked to withdraw the French army, which had come out to support the penetration into Saint-Quentin. The withdrawal was badly misjudged, and in a little time, much of the French army was routed.

In the disaster of the battle of Saint-Quentin, seven thousand French soldiers were made captive, including a considerable number of the kingdoms leading nobles like the maréchal de Saint-André, and duc de Montpensier. Among the noble dead of the battle was the comte d'Enghien, the vicomte de Turenne and around 600 other gentleman. In the broader army around 2,500 soldiers were dead.

With Enghien's death, his territories of Enghien and Soissons reverted to the family domain.

The following year, Enghien's elder brother the duc de Vendôme, and now king of Navarre, was keen for battle against the Spanish king Philip II in the hopes he might avenge the death of his younger brother. Navarre was recalled to the front in June 1558.

== Notes ==
^α Potter describes Humières as being Enghien's godson, but this is unlikely given their relative ages in 1528.

== Sources ==
- Baumgartner, Frederic (1988). Henry II: King of France 1547–1559. Duke University Press.
- Boltanski, Ariane (2006). Les ducs de Nevers et l'État royal: genèse d'un compromis (ca 1550 - ca 1600). Librairie Droz.
- Carroll, Stuart (2011). Martyrs and Murderers: The Guise Family and the Making of Europe. Oxford University Press.
- Cloulas, Ivan (1985). Henri II. Fayard.
- Crété, Liliane (1985). Coligny. Fayard.
- Decrue, Francis (1889). Anne, Duc de Montmorency: Connétable et Pair de France sous les Rois Henri II, François II et Charles IX. E. Plon, Nourrit et Cie.
- Jouanna, Arlette (2021). "BOURBON, maison de". In Jouanna, Arlette; Hamon, Philippe; Biloghi, Dominique; Le Thiec, Guy (eds.). La France de La Renaissance: Histoire et Dictionnaire. Bouquins.
- Knecht, Robert (2014). Catherine de' Medici. Routledge.
- Le Fur, Didier (2009). Henri II. Tallandier.
- Nawrocki, François (2015). L'Amiral Claude d'Annebault: conseiller favori de François Ier. Classiques Garnier.
- Neuschel, Kristen (1989). Word of Honor: Interpreting Noble Culture in Sixteenth-Century France. Cornell University Press.
- Poignant, Simone (1966). L'Abbaye de Fontevrault et les filles de Louis XV. Nouvelles éditions latines.
- Potter, David (1992). "The Luxembourg Inheritance: The House of Bourbon and its lands in Northern France during the Sixteenth Century". French History. 6 (1).
- Potter, David (1993). War and Government in the French Provinces: Picardy 1470-1560. Cambridge University Press.
- Roelker, Nancy (1968). Queen of Navarre: Jeanne d'Albret 1528-1572. Harvard University Press.
- Romier, Lucien (1909). Jacques d'Albon de Saint-André: Maréchal de France (1512 – 1562). Perrin et Cie.
- Sainte-Marie, Anselme de (1733). Histoire généalogique et chronologique de la maison royale de France, des pairs, grands officiers de la Couronne, de la Maison du Roy et des anciens barons du royaume: Tome I. La compagnie des libraires.
- Sournia, Jean-Charles (1981). Blaise de Monluc: Soldat et Écrivain (1500-1577). Fayard.
