= Rouault =

Rouault is a surname. Notable people with the surname include:

- Georges Rouault (1871–1958), French painter, draughtsman, and print artist
- Germaine Rouault (1905–1982), French racing driver
- Sébastien Rouault (born 1986), French freestyle swimmer
- Anthony Rouault (born 2001), French footballer
- Joachim Rouault (died 1478), French soldier
