= Standing army =

Permanent army composed of full-time career soldiers or conscripts

A standing army is a permanent, often professional, army. It is composed of full-time soldiers who may be either career soldiers or conscripts. It differs from army reserves, who are enrolled for the long term, but activated only during wars or natural disasters, and temporary armies, which are raised from the civilian population only during a war or threat of war, and disbanded once the war or threat is over. Standing armies tend to be better equipped, better trained, and better prepared for emergencies, defensive deterrence, and particularly, wars. The term dates from approximately 1603, although the phenomenon it describes is much older.

== History ==
=== Ancient history ===
==== Mesopotamia ====
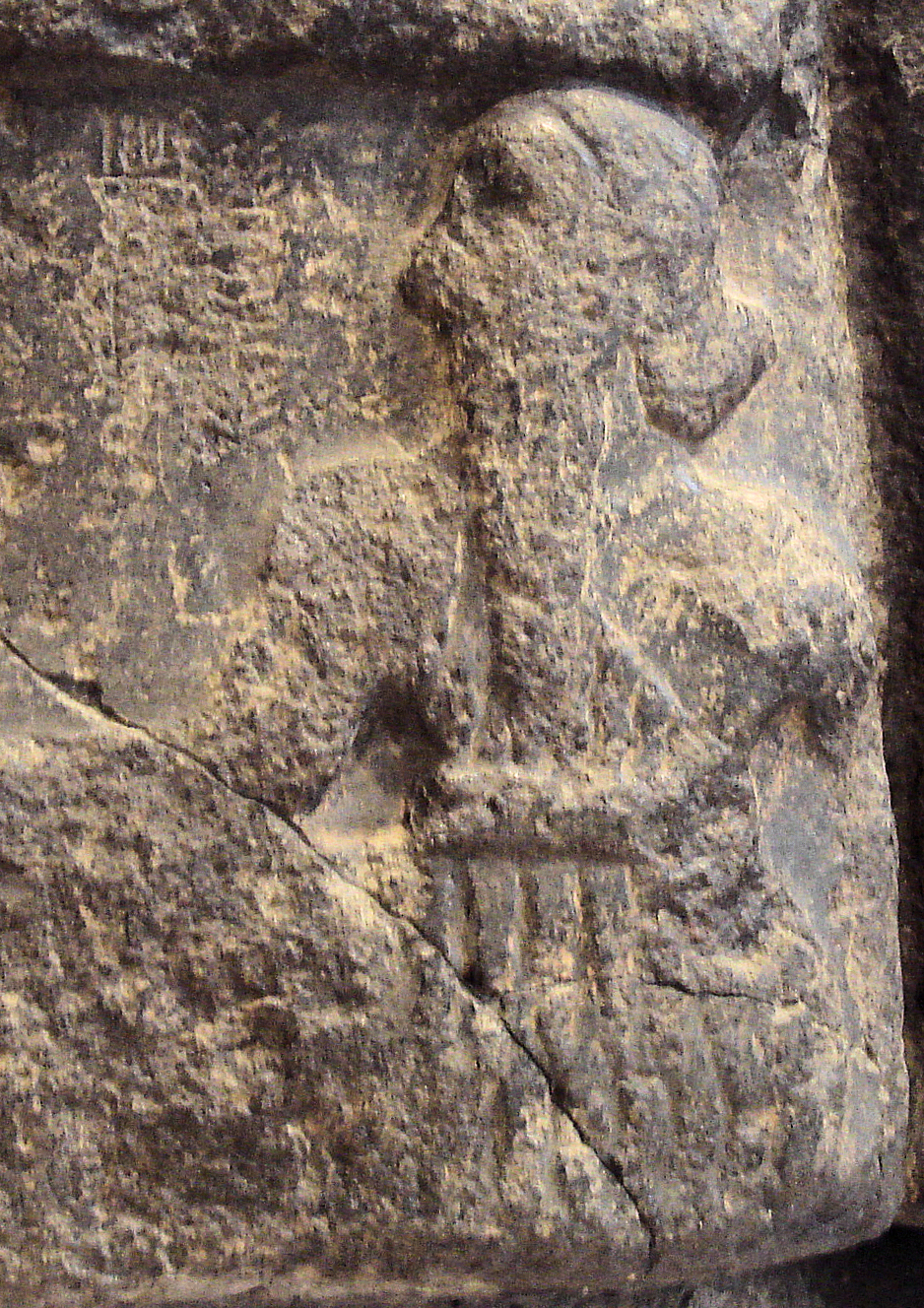
Sargon of Akkad, who is believed to have raised the first standing army

Sargon of Akkad, the founder of the Akkadian Empire, is believed to have raised the first standing professional army. Tiglath-Pileser III of Assyria (ruled 745–727 BC) created Assyria's first standing army. Tiglath-Pileser III disbanded militias and instead paid professional soldiers for their services. His army was composed largely of Assyrian soldiers but was supplemented with foreign mercenaries and vassal states. The standing army he created was the most sophisticated administrative and economic institution of its time, and it was the engine of the Assyrian economy, which capitalized on warfare.

==== Ancient Persia ====
Cyrus the Great formed the first professional army of Persia. The composition of the army varied and evolved. The empire's great armies were, like the empire itself, very diverse. Its standing army was composed of Persians (the bravest people of the empire, according to Herodotus) and Medes. This standing army, which may have been reviewed annually by the king or his representative, is referred to as kāra in the inscriptions. At the heart of this army was its elite guard, the 10,000 Immortals. Herodotus describes that if any of these guardsmen drops out owing to death or disease, a substitute is immediately supplied and the number again filled. Thousands of these 10,000 guardsmen composed the royal bodyguards in the palace, their insignia were golden apples or pomegranates at the butts of their spears (accordingly they are named “apple-bearers” by Heraclides Cumaeus).

==== Ancient Greece ====
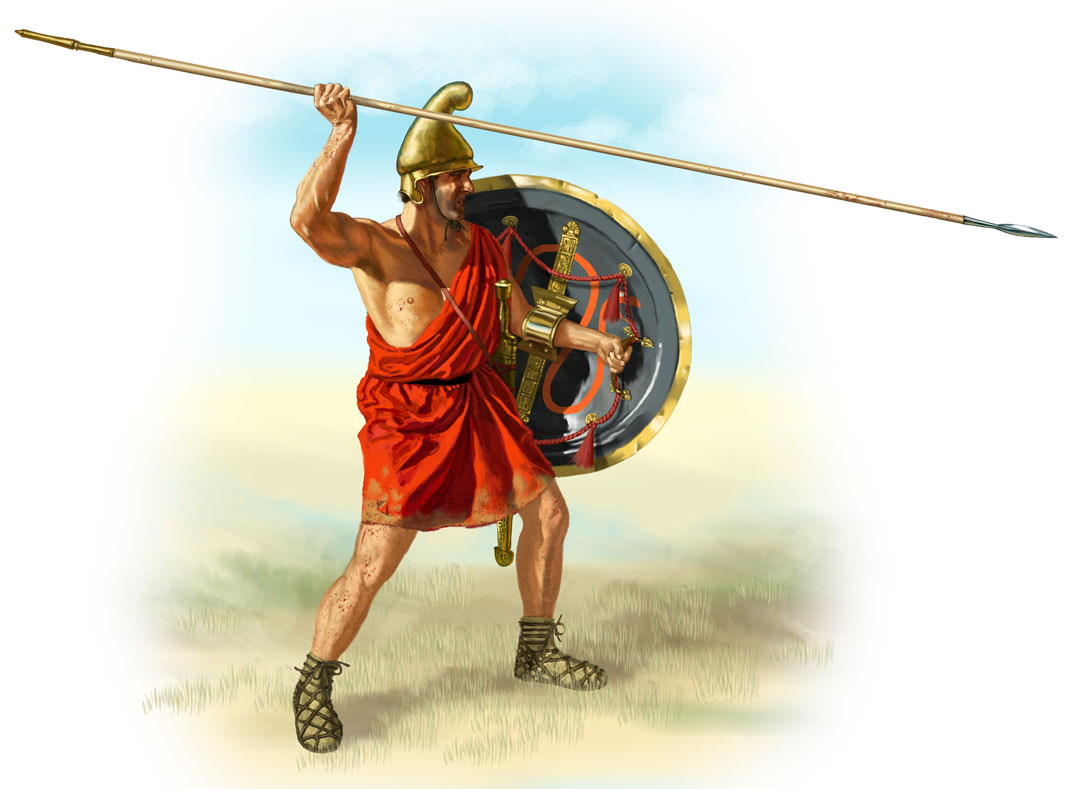
A hypaspist of the ancient Macedonian army, which was transformed into a standing army during the reign of Philip II

In ancient Greece, the armies of Greek city-states generally consisted exclusively of militias drawn from the civilian population. Although the city-state of Sparta is commonly claimed to have had the sole standing army of ancient Greece, a claim derived from early modern and 19th-century Western historians, in reality the Spartan army consisted entirely of militia in common with other Greek city-states. As noted by the English historian Stephen Hodkinson, "[contrary] to orthodox views, Sparta’s full citizens, the Spartiates, were not professional or specialized full-time soldiers and, apart from practice in elementary drill, their training focused mainly on physical fitness."

The city-state of Athens raised a professional cavalry force in the 440s BC which by the late 430s BC comprised 1,000 Hippeis (heavy cavalry) and 200 horse archers. From 421 to 418 BC, the city-state of Argos maintained a standing force of 1,000 hoplites, and in 378 BC the city-state of Thebes raised the Sacred Band of Thebes, a standing force of 300 elite hoplites which existed until 338 BC. Philip II of Macedon, who reigned from 359 to 336 BC, transformed the ancient Macedonian army into a standing force with its troops being paid year-round. This army would under Philip's son Alexander the Great go on to participate in numerous conquests.

==== Ancient China ====
The Western Zhou maintained a standing army, enabling them to control other city-states effectively and spread their influence. Unlike the Western Zhou, the Eastern Zhou initially did not have a standing army. Instead, they drafted militias from around 150 city-states. While the Eastern Zhao did not initially maintain a standing army, the state of Jin became the first to do so in 678 BCE. The first professional army in China was established by the Qin dynasty in 221 BCE, which ushered in Imperial China. Under the Qin dynasty, wars were fought by trained vocational soldiers instead of relying on temporary soldiers.

==== Ancient India ====
In Ancient India, warfare was first attested during the Vedic period. However, warfare was primarily waged between various clans and kingdoms solely by the kshatriya class during times of conflict. True standing armies in India developed under the Mahajanapadas, which relied on paid professional soldiers year-round. The most prominent of the Mahajanapadas was the Kingdom of Magadha. It is accepted that the first standing army of India was created in Maghada by the ruler Bimbisara.

K. A. Nilakanta Sastri described the Chola state as possessing a “powerful standing army” and a considerable navy. He regarded the development of these military forces as an important feature of the Chola imperial expansion.

==== Ancient Rome ====
Under the reign of Augustus, the first Roman emperor, a standing professional army of the Roman Empire was gradually instituted, with regularized pay. This professional force of legionaries was expensive to maintain, but supported the authority of the empire, not only as combat troops but also as provincial police forces, engineers, and guards. Legionaries were citizen volunteers entitled to a discharge bounty upon 25 years of honourable service; supplementing the legions were the auxilia, auxiliary forces composed of non-citizens in the provinces who typically earned citizenship as a reward for service.

In late antiquity and the early Byzantine period, this system evolved into a more differentiated military structure, in which mobile field armies (comitatenses) were complemented by frontier troops (limitanei) tasked with guarding and policing the imperial borders.

=== Post-classical history ===
==== Ottoman Empire ====
The first modern standing armies on European soil during the Middle Ages were the Janissaries of the Ottoman Empire, which were formed in the 14th century under Sultan Murad I.

==== France ====
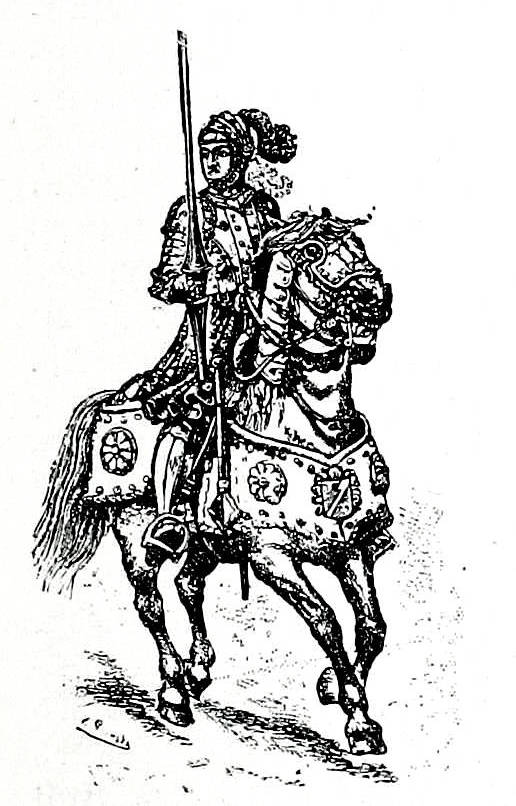
A cavalryman of the compagnies d'ordonnance, France's first standing units

The first Christian standing army since the fall of the Western Roman Empire to be paid with regular wages, instead of feudal levies, was established by King Charles VII of France in the 1430s while the Hundred Years' War was still raging. As he realized that France needed professional, reliable troops for ongoing and future conflicts, units were raised by issuing "ordonnances" to govern their length of service, composition and payment. These compagnies d'ordonnance formed the core of the French gendarmes that dominated European battlefields in the late 15th and early 16th centuries. They were stationed throughout France and summoned into larger armies when needed. Provisions were also made for franc-archers and foot soldiers raised from the non-noble classes, but those units were disbanded at the end of the Hundred Years' War.

The bulk of the infantry for warfare was still provided by urban or provincial militias, raised from a specific area or city to fight locally and named after their recruiting grounds. Gradually, these units became more permanent, and in the 1480s, Swiss instructors were recruited, and some of the 'bandes' (militia) were combined to form temporary 'legions' of up to 9,000 men. The men would be paid and contracted and would receive training.

Henry II further regularised the French army by forming standing infantry regiments to replace the militia structure. The first, the Régiments de Picardie, Piémont, Navarre, and Champagne, were collectively called "Les Vieux Corps" (The Old Corps). It was normal policy to disband regiments after a war was over to save costs. The Vieux Corps and the king's own household troops (the Maison militaire du roi de France) were the only survivors.

==== Hungary ====
The Black Army, established in 1462 by Hungarian king, Matthias Hunyadi, was the first Central/Eastern European standing army. However, while the Black Army was certainly the first standing field army in that part of Europe, Hungary in fact had maintained a permanent army in the form of garrisons of border fortresses since the 1420s.

Matthias recognized the importance and key role of early firearms in the infantry, which greatly contributed to his victories. Every fourth soldier in the Black Army had an arquebus, which was an unusual ratio at the time. The high price of medieval gunpowder prevented them from raising it any further. The main troops of the army were the infantry, artillery, and light and heavy cavalry. The function of the heavy cavalry was to protect the light armoured infantry and artillery, while the other corps delivered sporadic, surprise assaults on the enemy.

==== Songhai Empire ====
In West Africa, the Songhai Empire under the Askia Mohammad I (1493–1528) possessed a full-time corps of 40,000 professional warriors. Al-Sa'di, the chronicler who wrote the Tarikh al-Sudan, compared Askia Mohammad I's army to that of his predecessor; "he distinguished between the civilian and the army, unlike Sunni Ali [1464–92] when everyone was a soldier." Askia Mohammad I is said to have possessed cynical attitudes towards kingdoms that lacked professional armies like his, notably in reference to the neighbouring kingdoms in the land of Borgu.

==== Majapahit Empire ====
A Chinese observer recorded the Majapahit thalassocracy as having 30,000 full-time professional troops, whose soldiers and commanders were paid in gold. This demonstrates the existence of a standing army, an achievement that only a handful of Southeast Asian empires could aspire to. In addition to these professional soldiers, Majapahit was strengthened by troops from subordinate countries and regional leaders. As was common in Southeast Asia, Majapahit also used a levy system, in fact, the majority of the Majapahit troops were a levy.

==== Russia ====
Russia was isolated from Central and Western European warfare for centuries as a result of the 13th-century Mongol conquests. Ivan the Terrible reformed the state apparatus and centralized his power. Meanwhile, external pressure from Poland and Sweden in the west, and the Tatar khanates in the east, led him to reform the army and establish Russia's first permanent standing military force, the streltsy, in the mid-16th century.

==== Spain ====
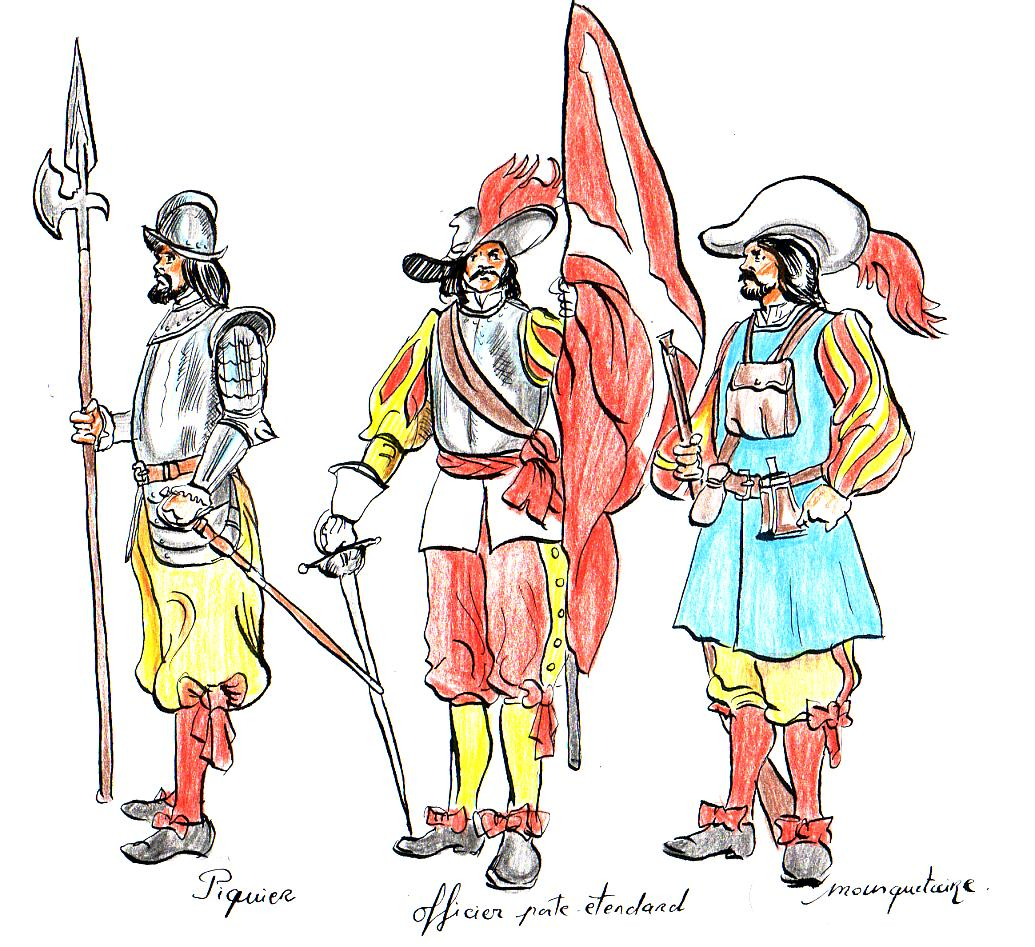
Soldiers of a tercio, Spain's first type of standing unit

The tercios of the Spanish Empire were the first Spanish standing units composed of professional soldiers. Their pike and shot composition assured predominance in the European battlefields from the 16th century to the first half of the 17th century. Although other powers adopted the tercio formation, their armies fell short of the fearsome reputation of the Spanish, whose core of professional soldiers gave them an edge that was hard for other states to match.

==== Britain ====
Prior to the mid-17th century, the kingdoms of England, Scotland and Ireland relied solely on the militia and temporary units of conscripts, volunteers and mercenaries for national defence due to in part to political opposition to a peacetime standing army. During the First English Civil War, the Parliamentarians raised the New Model Army, a standing army in which 50,000 men served at its height, in 1645. Though the New Model Army was disbanded by the Parliament of England in 1660 following the Stuart Restoration, the standing English Army was raised in January 1661 by Charles II, which many New Model Army veterans joined. By 1688 the English Army numbered over 34,000 men. Following the Glorious Revolution of 1688, the English Parliament passed the Bill of Rights 1689 which placed the English army under Parliament's control and under the direction of William III the army was enlarged to 94,000 men by 1694. Fearing royal power, during the Standing Army Controversy the English Parliament reduced the English army to 7,000 English-born subjects in 1698.

==== United States ====
In the Thirteen Colonies of British America, there was a strong distrust of a standing army not under civilian control. The U.S. Constitution in (Article 1, Section 8) limits federal appropriations to two years, and reserves financial control to Congress, instead of to the President. The President, however, retains command of the armed forces when they are raised, as commander-in-chief. The Framers' suspicion of a standing army is reflected in the constitutional requirement that the appointment and promotion of high-ranking military officers (like civil officers) be confirmed by the United States Senate. At the 1787 Constitutional Convention, Elbridge Gerry argued against a large standing army, comparing it to an erect penis: "An excellent assurance of domestic tranquility, but a dangerous temptation to foreign adventure." After the Battle of Bladensburg in 1814, during which American militiamen from Maryland and Virginia were soundly defeated by the British Army, President James Madison commented "I could never have believed so great a difference existed between regular troops and a militia force, if I not witnessed the scenes of this day."

The benefits of a standing army are distributed unevenly, and so throughout the history of the US, support has varied by region. For example, naval expansion was supported by the Northeast to further their interests in commercial shipping during the early 1800s. Coastal Southerners also supported naval spending, but those further inland preferred internal improvements such as canals, railways, and roads. Support for naval expansion became more widespread during the 1840s and 1850s with the rise of manifest destiny, with special interest in the South. The frustrating compromises over slavery caused serious talk of expanding the slave-holding area of the country into the Caribbean by the likes of William Walker.

== See also ==
- Regular army
- List of militaries by country
- List of countries by number of military and paramilitary personnel
- List of armies by country
