= Man-at-arms =

European fully-armoured heavy cavalrymen

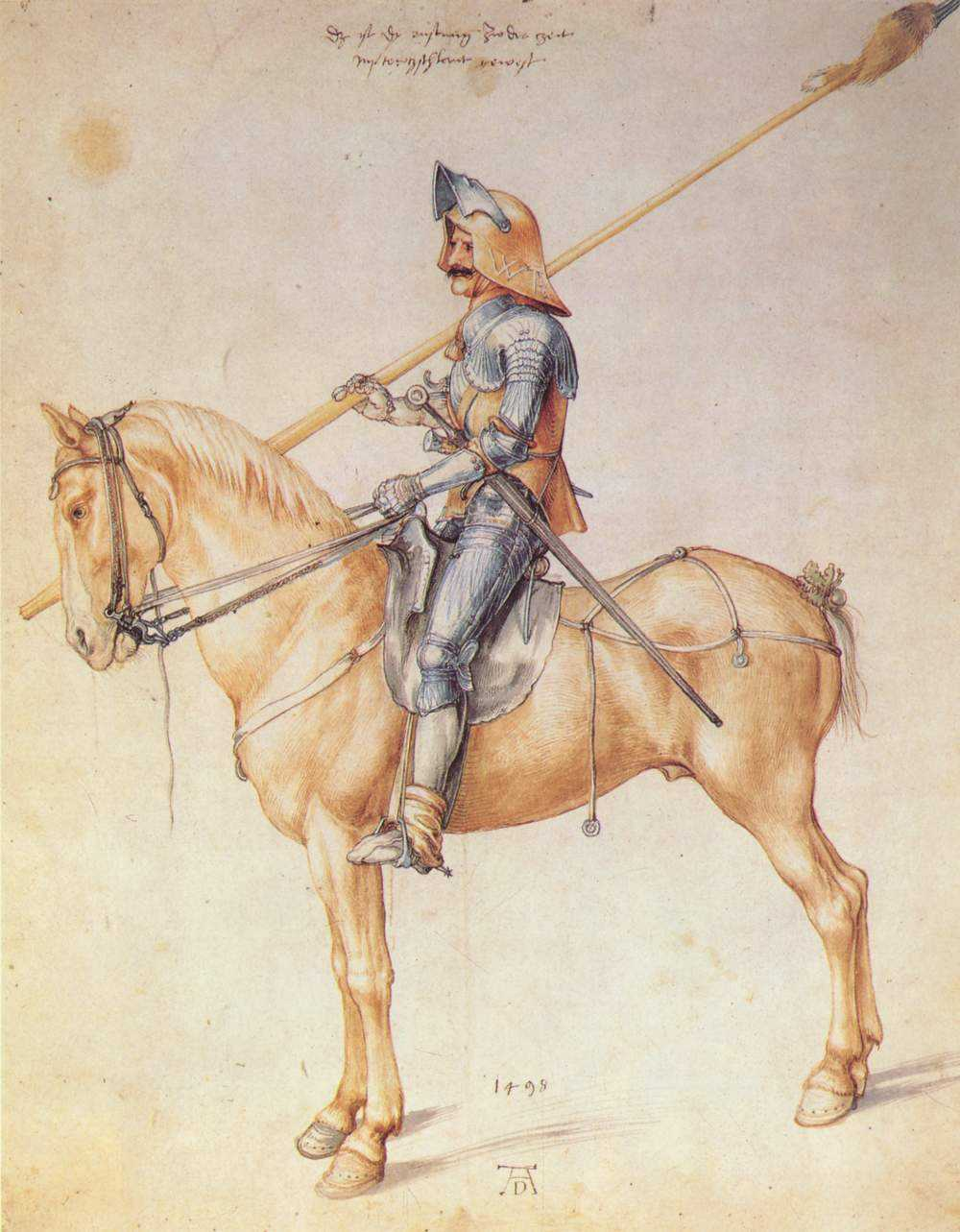
1498 illustration of a German man-at-arms by Albrecht Dürer. The man-at-arms is equipped as a demi-lancer.

A man-at-arms was a soldier of the High Medieval to Renaissance periods who was typically well-versed in the use of arms and served as a fully-armoured heavy cavalryman. (Note: The Old French: gen d'armes, plural gens d'armes or gendarmerie as a collective noun, was the direct equivalent of the English 'man-at-arms'.) A man-at-arms could be a knight, nobleman, member of a knight's or nobleman's retinue, or a mercenary in a company serving under a captain. Such men could serve for pay or through a feudal obligation. The terms knight and man-at-arms are often used interchangeably, but while all knights equipped for war were men-at-arms, not all men-at-arms were knights.

== Terminology ==
Though in English the term man-at-arms is a fairly straightforward rendering of the French homme d'armes, (Note: Originally translated in English as "man-of-arms" but from the 16th century as "man-at-arms.") in the Middle Ages, there were numerous terms for this type of soldier, referring to the type of arms he would be expected to provide: In France, he might be known as a lance or glaive, while in Germany, Spieß, Helm or Gleve, and in various places, a bascinet. In Italy, the term barbuta was used, and in England from the late 14th century, men-at-arms were known as lances or spears.

In the Early Medieval period, any well-equipped horseman could be described as a "knight", or in Latin, miles. In the course of the 12th century knighthood became a social rank with a distinction being made between milites gregarii (non-noble cavalrymen) and milites nobiles (true knights). As a fully armoured cavalryman could be of a lesser social status than a knight, an alternative term describing this type of soldier came into use which was, in French, homme d'armes or gent d'armes, and in English man-at-arms. This evolution differed in detail and timeline across Europe but by 1300, there was a clear distinction between the military function of the man-at-arms and the social rank of knighthood. The term man-at-arms thus primarily denoted a military function, rather than a social rank.

== Military function ==
The military function that a man-at-arms performed was serving as a fully-armoured heavy cavalryman; though he could, and in the 14th and 15th centuries often did, also fight on foot. In the course of the 16th century, the man-at-arms was gradually replaced by other cavalry types, the demi-lancer and the cuirassier, characterised by less-extensive armour coverage and the use of weapons other than the heavy lance.

=== Arms and armour ===
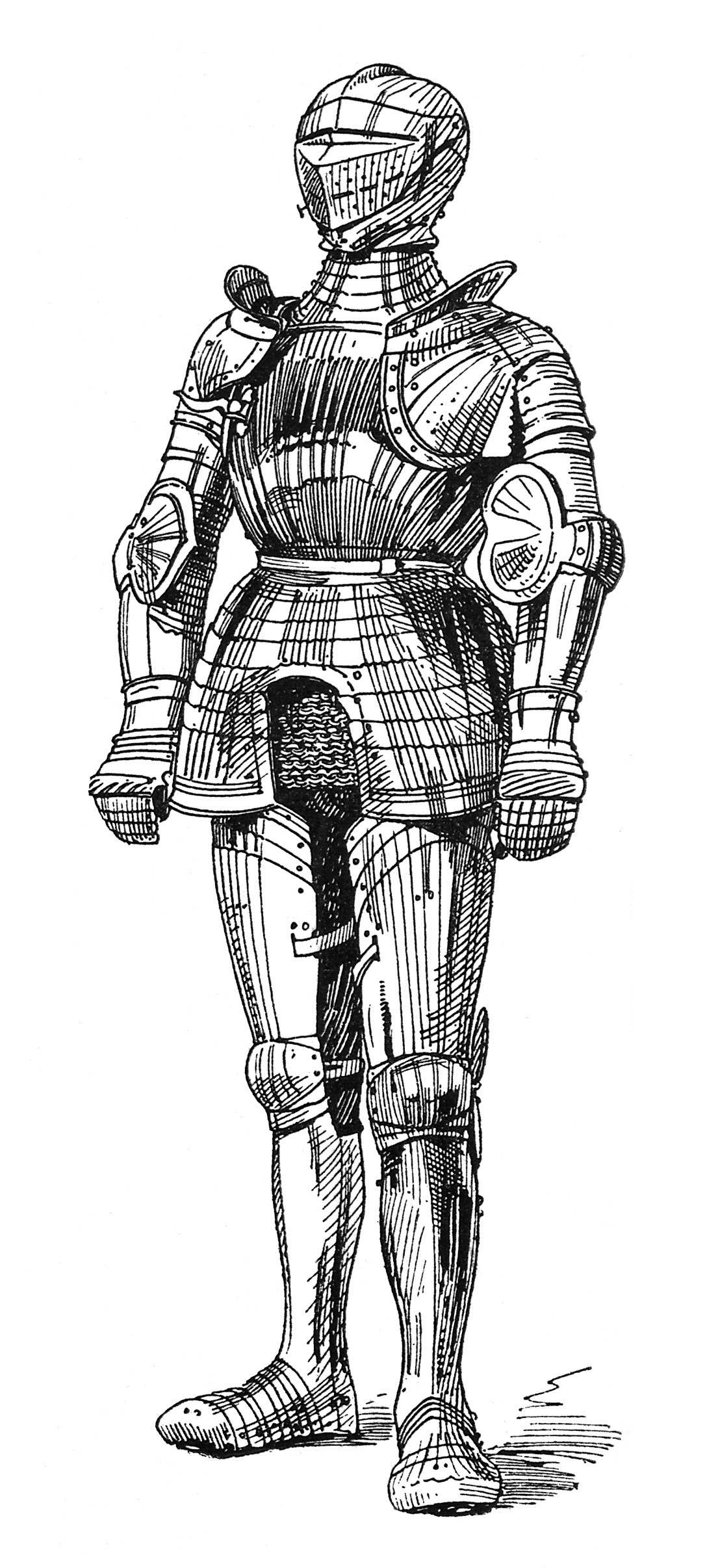
Armour of an early 16th-century man-at-arms

Throughout the medieval period and into the Renaissance the armour of the man-at-arms became progressively more effective and expensive. Throughout the 14th century, the armour worn by a man-at-arms was a composite of materials. Over a quilted gambeson, mail armour covered the body, limbs and head. Increasingly during the century, the mail was supplemented by plate armour on the body and limbs. In the 15th century, full plate armour was developed, which reduced the mail component to a few points of flexible reinforcement.

From the 14th to 16th century, the primary weapon of the man at arms on horseback was the lance. The lance of the 14th century was essentially a simple spear, 12 ft (3.7 m) in length, usually of ash. In response to the development of improved armour, however, heavier lances weighing up to 18 kg (40 lb) were developed, combined with a new method of using them in conjunction with a lance rest (arrêt) fixed to the breastplate. This combination of heavy lance and arrêt enabled the mounted man-at-arms to enjoy a new effectiveness on the battlefields of the later 15th and 16th centuries. Not all men-at-arms in the 15th century carried the heavy lance. A lighter weapon called a demi-lance evolved and this gave its name to a new class of a lighter-equipped man-at-arms, the demi-lancer, towards the end of the 15th century.

When fighting on foot, men-at-arms initially modified their ordinary cavalry weapons. English men-at-arms in Italy in the 1360s are recorded as advancing in close order with two men holding a cavalry lance. On other occasions, such as at the Battle of Agincourt, men-at-arms cut down their lances to a more manageable size of 5 ft (1.5 m). In the 15th century, the increased protection of plate armour led to the development of a specialist foot combat weapon, the two-handed poleaxe.

=== Horses ===
The horse was an essential part of a man-at-arm's equipment. The type of horse, however, varied according to wealth and status. Andrew Ayton in an in-depth study of English warhorses of the 13th and 14th centuries has shown that three types predominate: the destrier, the courser and an animal simply known as a "horse" (L:equus Med Fr : chival). Destriers were both rare and expensive, making up 5% of men-at-arms horses. Ayton also calculated the value of the average man-at-arm's horse in thirteen campaigns between 1282 and 1364, showing it varied between £7.6 and £16.4. In only two campaigns in the mid-14th century did the majority of horses cost more than £10. The horse was, therefore, a major item of expenditure in the equipment of a man-at-arms. It has been calculated that a French gendarme's horse in the mid-15th century cost the equivalent of six months' wages. The cost of horses meant that the professional soldier might not wish to risk his expensive asset in combat. A system evolved in the 13th century for employers to compensate for horses lost in action. In England this was called by the Latin name restauro equorum and similar systems were in use in France and Italy. In order to secure this insurance scheme, the man-at-arms had the value of his horse assessed and details of its appearance recorded. The assessment system also allowed employers to insist on a minimum value (and hence quality) of horse be presented at muster. In 14th-century England, the minimum value appears in most cases to be 100 shillings (£5).

==== Horse armour ====
As early as the late 13th century, Edward I decreed that all his men-at-arms should be mounted on equus coopertus, that is armoured, or barded, horses. Horse armour was not at that time always made of metal, with leather and quilted fabric armour also in use. Metal horse armours were made from mail or brigandine, with plate reserved for the head in the form of a chamfron. In the 15th century, plate armour for horses was introduced and was a common feature of the equipment of the gendarme into the 16th century.

== In England ==
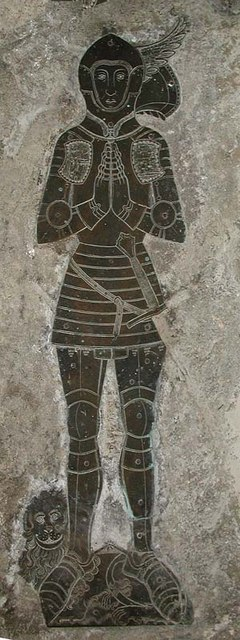
English man-at-arms, funerary brass c. 1431

=== Social status ===
The social structure of the Anglo-Norman society of England was relatively rigid. One of the easiest ways for a man to improve his social rank was through military service; another method was through the church. In the Norman states, unlike in many other contemporary societies, the knighting of men of common birth who had demonstrated ability and courage on the field of battle was possible. Although rare, some non-knightly men-at-arms did advance socially to the status of knights. The knighting of squires and men-at-arms was sometimes done in an ignoble manner, simply to increase the number of knights within an army (such practice was common during the Hundred Years' War). In chivalric theory, any knight could bestow knighthood on another, however, in practice this was usually done by sovereigns and the higher nobility. It is recorded that the great mercenary captain Sir John Hawkwood knighted a number of his followers, as many as twenty on one occasion, though he could reasonably be expected to provide the income his created knights required to maintain their new status. Attempts to restrict the power of commanders to make knights would increase during the 16th century and by the end of Elizabeth I's reign, the practice had all but ceased.

Although a knight bachelor, a knight banneret and all grades of nobility usually served as men-at-arms when called to war, the bulk of men-at-arms from the later 13th century came from an evolving social group which became known as the gentry. The man-at-arms could be a wealthy mercenary of any social origin, but more often he had some level of social rank based on income, usually from land. Some came from the class known as serjeants but increasingly during the 14th century they were drawn from an evolving class of esquire. Esquires were frequently of families of knightly rank, wealthy enough to afford the arms of a knight but who had thus far not been advanced to knightly status or perhaps had avoided it because they did not want the costs and responsibilities of that rank. Also found serving as men-at-arms were the lowest social group of the gentry, known by the 15th century simply as gentlemen.

The proportion of knights among the men-at-arms varied through time. Between the 1280s and 1360s, figures between 20 and 30% were commonplace. Thereafter, there was a rapid decline, with the figure dropping to 6.5% in 1380. A slight rise is recorded to 8% at Agincourt, perhaps because this was a royal army, but thereafter the figure continued to decline and by 1443, the Duke of Somerset mustered only 1.3% knights among his men-at-arms.

=== Conditions of service ===
Social status affected the types of military service performed by men-at-arms. Garrison duty was considered unattractive and was often carried out by soldiers of lesser status. For example, the English garrison in the Scottish town of Roxburgh in 1301 consisted of just three knights compared to twenty seven men-at-arms of lesser status.

The social stratification of men who served as men-at-arms is illustrated by their rates of pay on campaign. In the mid 1340s a knight was paid two shillings a day, an ordinary man-at-arms was paid half this amount; for comparison a foot archer received two or three pence (12 pennies to the shilling). A man-at-arms was also recompensed differentially according to the quality of his principal war-horse, if the horse was to die or was killed in battle. An ordinary esquire might own a war-horse worth only five pounds whilst a great nobleman might own a horse worth up to 100 pounds.

=== Military role ===
English men-at-arms before the second quarter of the 14th century were indistinguishable from their continental counterparts, serving as heavy cavalry on the field of battle. The Battle of Dupplin Moor in 1332, against the Scots, signalled a major change in the battlefield role of the English man-at-arms. This battle was the first major encounter where the tactical combination of dismounted men-at-arms with longbow-armed archers was deployed; the men-at-arms functioning as heavy close-combat infantry. This combination was later employed very effectively against the French in the Hundred Years' War. The English man-at-arms remained highly trained in mounted combat, though his use of the warhorse became largely confined to the pursuit of a broken enemy, skirmishing and in the chevauchée. In the late 15th century a resurgence in the effectiveness of the heavy lancer in combat took place in Europe. This was reflected to some extent in England, exemplified by Richard III's mounted charge at the Battle of Bosworth (1485) and the English cavalry charge at the Battle of the Spurs (1513).

The last major battle in which English men-at-arms were prominent was fought against a Scottish army in 1547 at Pinkie Cleugh. The outnumbered Scots cavalry were easily driven off by the English horse (the Scots cavalry having lost heavily in an engagement the day before), the Scots then made a sudden advance with their massed pikemen. To slow their onset and give time for the English infantry to receive them the English heavy horse (men-at-arms and demi-lancers) were thrown against the pikes. The English cavalry crashed into the pikemen with great elan but sustained considerable losses. However, they halted the Scots attack, buying time for the English infantry and artillery to deploy effectively; the battle resulted in a heavy defeat for the Scots.

== In France ==
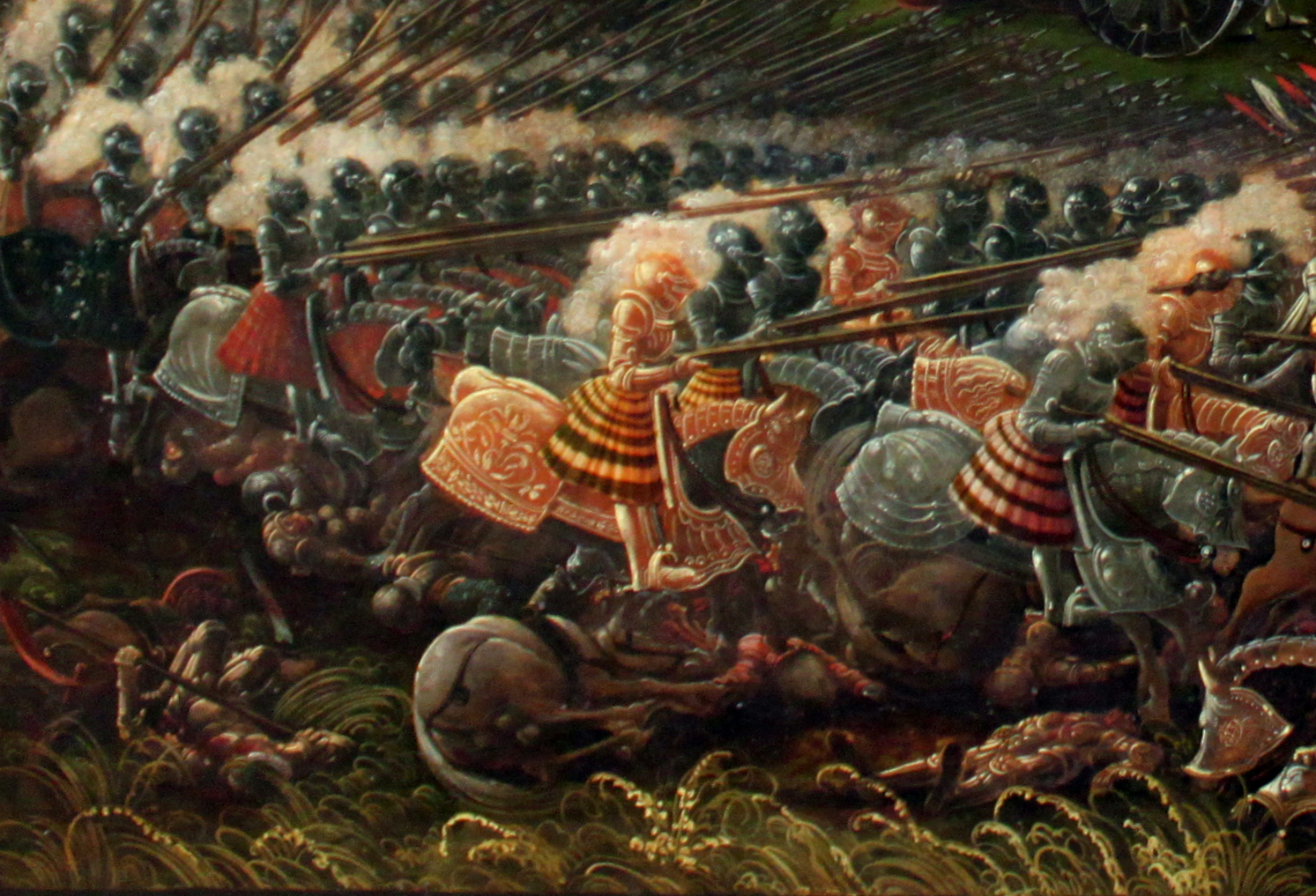
Fully armoured gendarmes from the Italian Wars (mid 16th century).

French men-at-arms were, as elsewhere, drawn from the broad class of gentil hommes. Up to the middle of the 14th century, they attended the royal army either in company of their feudal lords or as individuals. In 1351, the first in a series of ordonnances was proclaimed, attempting to regularise the organisation of men-at-arms into units of 25 to 80 combatants. New ordonnances were issued occasionally to either reinforce or reform previous ones. The ordonnance of 1363 attempted to create a standing army of 6,000 men-at-arms, although it might not have achieved more than 3,000 in reality. In 1445, a more radical overhaul was attempted. 15 companies of the ordonnance were created, each of 100 lances. Each lance contained a man-at-arms, a coustillier, three mounted archers and a page. In 1446, the scheme was extended to add another five companies, giving a total of 2,000 men-at-arms. Eventually, the number of these gens d'ordonnance du roi raised by Louis XI would reach 15,816 men, including 2,636 men-at-arms.

=== The 16th century ===
The number of men-at-arms would continue to fluctuate, dependent on military circumstances, into the 16th century. In the first quarter of the century, they varied between a peacetime minimum of 1500 lances in 1505 and a wartime maximum of 3847 in 1523. The changes were made both by raising and disbanding whole companies and by varying the number of men in ordonnance companies. In 1559, for example, Francis II reduced the number of lances in each company by 20.

By the 1580s the traditional French gendarme, as a lance-armed heavily armoured cavalryman, was in sharp decline. The Battle of Coutras (October 20, 1587), between Henry of Navarre, and the Duc de Joyeuse, during the French Wars of Religion, illustrates the demise of the heavy lancer. Navarre's cavalry were 1,300 armoured pistoleers whilst the Royalists under Joyeuse were 2,000 heavy lancers (gendarmes). Within a few minutes of combat the lancers had been routed, many being captured and held for ransom. All later French cavalry named 'gendarmes' were more lightly armoured, eventually becoming unarmoured, and employed firearms and a sword, rather than the heavy lance.

=== Later history ===
Louis XIV on his accession to the throne found only eight companies of gendarmes surviving out of an original total of more than one hundred, but after the victory of Fleurus (1690), which had been decided by their courage, he increased their number to sixteen. The four first companies were designated by the names of Gendarmes ecossais, Gendarmes anglais, Gendarmes bourguignons and Gendarmes flamands, from the nationality of the soldiers who had originally composed them, but at that time they consisted entirely of French soldiers and officers. These four companies had a captain-general, who was the king. The fifth company was that of the queen and the others bore the name of the princes who respectively commanded them. This organisation was dissolved in 1788.

=== Evolution into a paramilitary police force ===
A military corps having such duties was first created in 1337 and was placed under the orders of the Constable of France (connétable), and therefore named connétablie. In 1626 after the abolition of the title of connétable, it was put under the command of the Maréchal of France, and renamed Maréchaussée. Its main mission was protecting the roads from highwaymen. In 1720 the maréchaussée was subordinated to the gendarmerie; after the French Revolution the maréchaussée was abolished and the gendarmerie took over its duties in 1791.

== In Spain ==
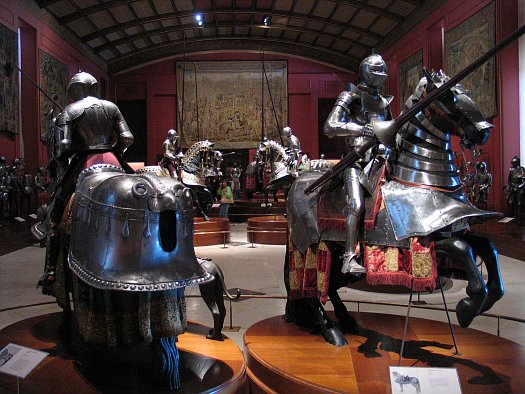
Armour for man-at-arms and fully barded horse, Royal Armory of Madrid

Spain had multiple factors contributing to the strong chivalric ethos exemplified by Spanish knights and men-at-arms. One factor leading to the prominence of chivalric orders in Spain, is the Reconquista in which Christian kingdoms attempted to regain land from, and eventually expel from the peninsula, the Muslim states. The greatest foes of the Spanish Christian knight were, above all, Muslims; who were a local and deeply entrenched enemy, not as distant as the 'infidel' was for the knights of other European regions. However, warfare between the Christian states of the Iberian Peninsula was also not uncommon. It can be argued that in Spain the existence of a common enemy had some role in uniting Christian kingdoms in the cause of the Crusades and Reconquista.

In the 12th–13th century most of the prominent Spanish Knightly orders were formed. The early history of chivalric orders in the peninsula was unstable. In Calatrava, during the middle of the 12th century Castilian Knights established a fortress, which would later be abandoned due to the threat of Muslim attack, then again within fifty years the castle of the Order of Calatrava was then rebuilt and became a fortified monastic community.

In the Italian Wars the Spanish man-at-arms was prominent in the campaigns. One example is at the Battle of Cerignola, which began with two charges by the French heavy cavalry against the center of the Spanish army, but these were scattered by Spanish heavy artillery and arquebus fire. The next assault tried to force the right flank, but many of the French cavalrymen fell into the Spanish trench and the attack was then broken by a storm of fire from the Spanish arquebusiers.

The Spanish leader Gonzalo Fernández de Córdoba then called for a counterattack against the now disorganized enemy by both the Spanish infantry and the heavy Spanish cavalry waiting in reserve. Mounted arquebusiers surrounded and routed the remaining French gendarmes, but the Swiss pikeman managed to retreat in a relatively organized fashion.

== In Italy ==
Men-at-arms formed the core troops of the Italian condottiere companies from the 14th to the 16th century. Although the man-at-arms always remained essentially a mounted soldier, in the 14th century, they often fought on foot, following the example of English mercenaries who, from the second half of the century, commonly fought there. The system of condotte or contracts which gave the condottieri their name led to the construction of armies from a number of contract holders, usually grouped under a main contractor. Perhaps the best known of these is the White Company led by Sir John Hawkwood in the 14th century. Organisation of these companies was in lanze of three men, initially two fighting men and a page but later a man-at-arms, an armed servant (piatto) and a page (ragazzo). 5 lanze were grouped to form a posta and five of these made a bandiera.

In the 15th century, the structure of the companies changed. A company would be organised into a number of squadrons. One of these would be the household squadron of the captain, known as the casa, which contained both fighting troops and headquarters staff, such as a marshal, chaplain, chancellors, cooks and servants. The size of squadrons varied but would contain about 25 lanze.

In the second half of the century, these structures began to be supplemented by the practice of states hiring alongside companies individual men-at-arms, who were then grouped under a commander appointed by the state. These were originally recruited from men-at-arms whose company commander had died or retired and so were known as lanze spezzate or broken lances. At the same time, changes were seen in the components of the lanze, with the introduction of the corazzo, a larger unit but still containing just one man-at-arms, and the recognition of two types of men-at-arms in condotte; true men-at-arms known as armigeri veri and lighter-equipped elmetti. Towards the end of the 15th century, squadrons of men-at-arms begin to be organised into larger formations known as columns led by a senior condottiero called a colonello. A column typically contained eight to ten squadrons.

== Bibliography ==
- Ayton, Andrew (1994). Knights and Warhorses. Woodbridge: Boydell & Brewer. ISBN 0851157394.
- Bell, Adrian; Curry, Anne; King, Andy; Simpkin, David (2013). The Soldier in Later Medieval England. Oxford: Oxford University Press. ISBN 9780199680825.
- Church, S.; Harvey, R., eds. (1994). Medieval knighthood V: papers from the sixth Strawberry Hill Conference 1994. Woodbridge: Boydell & Brewer.
- Contamine, Philippe (1984). War in the Middle Ages. Oxford: Wiley-Blackwell. ISBN 0631131426.
- Cooper, S. (2008). Sir John Hawkwood, Pen and Sword Books, Barnsley.
- Coss, Peter (1993). The Knight in Medieval England 1000–1400. Stroud, Glos: Alan Sutton. ISBN 075090996X.
- Curry, A. (ed.) (1994) Arms, armies and fortifications in the Hundred Years War. Boydell & Brewer, Woodbridge.
- Edge, David; Paddock, John Miles (1988). Arms and Armour of the Medieval Knight. London: Defoe. ISBN 1870981006.
- Fowler, Kenneth (1980) [1967]. The Age of Plantagenet and Valois. London: Ferndale Editions. ISBN 0905746090.
- Fritze, Ronald H. and Robison, William B. (eds.) (2002) Historical Dictionary of Late Medieval England, 1272-1485, Greenwood Publishing Group, Westport, CT ISBN 9780313291241
- Gravett, Christopher (1999). Bosworth 1485: Last Charge of the Plantagenets. Campaign. Vol. 66. Oxford: Osprey Publishing. ISBN 1-85532-863-1.
- Gravett, C. (2006). Tudor Knight, Osprey Publishing, Oxford.
- Mallett, Michael (1974). Mercenaries and their Masters, The Bodley Head, London, ISBN 0370105028
- Martin, Paul (1968). Armour and Weapons. London: Barrie & Jenkins.
- Nicholson, Helen J. (2004). Medieval warfare: theory and practice of war in Europe, 300–1500, Palgrave Macmillan.
- Oman, Sir Charles W. C. (1998). History of the Art of War in the 16th Century, reprinted (ed.), Greenhill Books ISBN 0-947898-69-7
- Potter, David (2008). Renaissance France at War. Woodbridge: Boydell & Brewer. ISBN 9781843834052.
- Prestwich, Michael (1996) Armies and Warfare in the Middle Ages: The English Experience, New Haven: Yale University Press ISBN 0300076630
- Rogers, Clifford J. (2008). "The Battle of Agincourt", in The Hundred Years' War (Part II): Different Vistas, ed. L. J. Andrew Villalon and Donald J. Kagay, Leiden: Brill Publishers: 37–132.
- Simpkin, D, (2008) The English aristocracy at war: from the Welsh wars of Edward I to the Battle of Bannockburn. Boydell & Brewer, Woodbridge.
- Vale, Malcolm (1981). War and Chivalry. London: Duckworth Books. ISBN 0715610422.
