= Franc-archer =

francs-archers
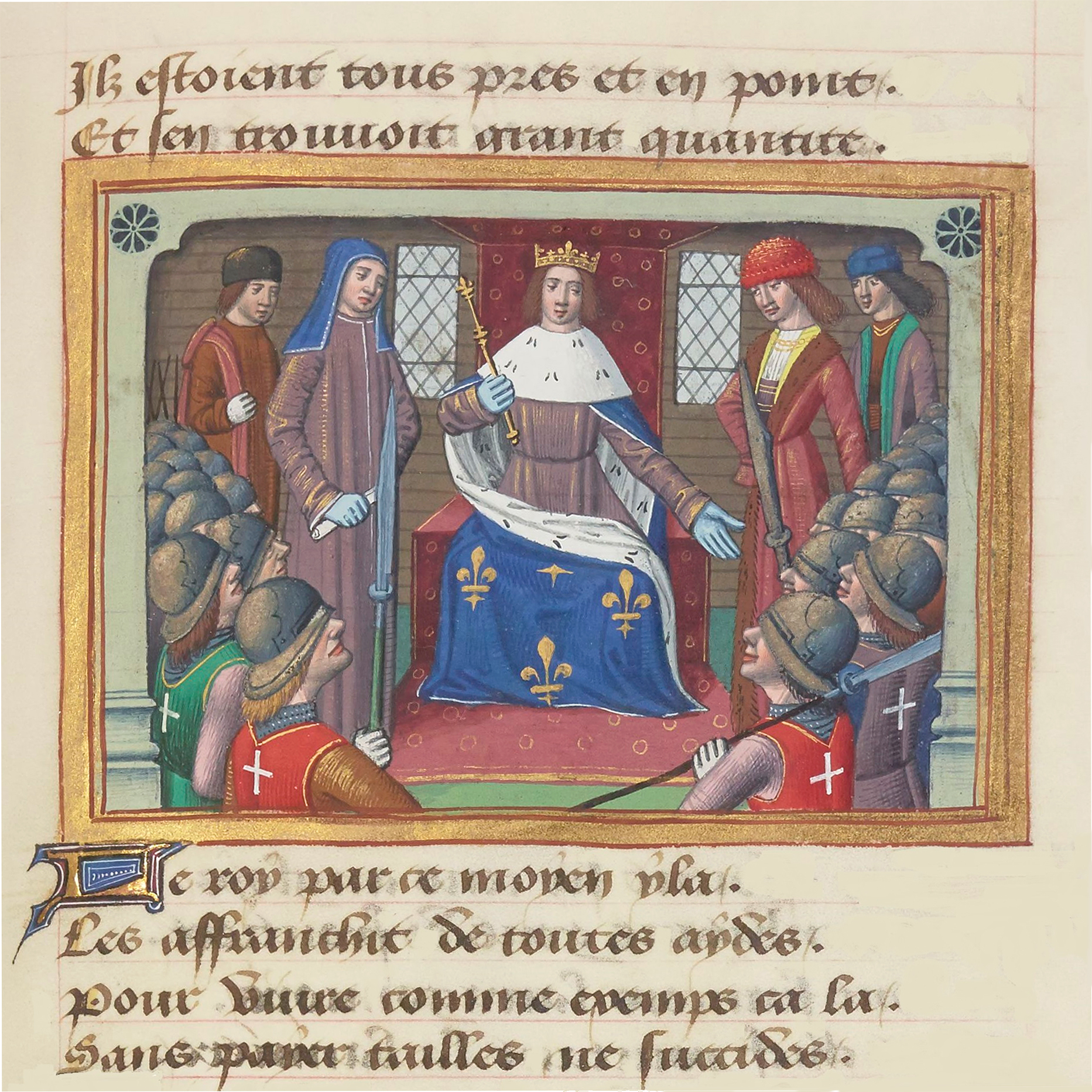
- King Charles VII creates the francs-archers. Portrayal in the 1484 manuscript Vigiles du roi Charles VII
- Active: 28 April 1448 – 1481; 1485 – 1535
- Country: Kingdom of France
- Allegiance: Royal
- Type: Light infantry
- Role: Militia
- Size: 24,000 (1522)
- Nickname: Francs-taupins
- Engagements: Hundred Years' War: Castillon; War of the Public Weal; War of the Burgundian Succession: Guinegate; Mad War; War of the League of Cambrai Italian War of 1521–26

Commanders
- Notable commanders: Marshal Joachim Rouault; Marshal Philippe de Crèvecœur d'Esquerdes

The francs-archers ("free archers") militia were the first attempt at the formation of regular infantry in France. They were created by the ordonnance of Montil-lès-Tours on 28 April 1448, which prescribed that in each parish an archer should be chosen from among the most apt in the use of arms; who was to be exempt from the taille and certain obligations, to practise shooting with the bow on Sundays and feast-days, and to hold himself ready to march fully equipped at the first signal. Under Charles VII the francs-archers distinguished themselves in numerous battles with the English, and assisted the king in driving them from France.

The Francs-archers' deficient combat performance, indiscipline and unreliability led Louis XI in 1480 to train a professional army under Marshal Philippe de Crèvecœur d'Esquerdes and abolish the militia a year later, ordering their equipment to be put in store in the parishes. The cost of this permanent force was too great for the kingdom's finances, with the standing army being disbanded in 1483–1484 after Louis XI's death. In 1485 the franc-archer system was re-established and they were employed again in the Flanders campaign of the Mad War under Esquerdes.

During the Italian Wars, the francs-archers were primarily used for frontier defense. In May 1513 Louis XII raised 22,000 of them for such a purpose. They occasionally served in the field during campaigns such as in 1522 and 1523. They were levied for the last time after the French defeat at Pavia. The francs-archers were definitively disbanded in 1535.

== Recruitment and composition ==
A Franc-archer was recruited in every parish of France. The parish was obligated to choose an archer and supply him with the specified equipment. The archer would train himself on feast-days and holidays. They were free from all taxes (hence the name) and were paid four francs for every month of service. The Francs-archers were predominantly older men, with the average age being 32. They often had to be re-equipped after service, breeding resentment among the villagers. They would also misuse their position to oppress the peasantry, while pretending to be simply obeying the king's will.

== Organization and equipment ==
During the Hundred Years' War the francs-archers fought in companies of 200–300 men. The companies were led by nobles and were later put under the command of 4 captains-general. The 1448 ordonnance specified the equipment of the archer as a sallet helmet, dagger, sword, a bow, a sheaf of arrows, a jerkin and a coat of mail. In 1466 they used the pike for the first time and by the late 1470s some companies were employing Swiss-style pikemen. During the Mad War in 1488, Esquerdes took 12,000 francs-archers for his campaign in Flanders.

In 1513, the 22,000-strong francs-archers levy was raised for 18 months and was organised into 44 ensigns of 500 men, each led by five centeniers. In 1510 Machiavelli noted that each franc-archer was required to have a horse. The Decree of 17 January 1522 listed the updated equipment of the franc-archer as comprising a corselet, a mail gorget, arm-pieces, a mail skirt and a helmet. Two-thirds were to be pikemen and the rest would be armed with halberds, crossbows and arquebuses.

== Service ==
The Francs-archers were primarily used for frontier defense against foreign enemies and against bandits in the interior such as the aventuriers. They were also used in field battles, though their combat effectiveness against professional troops was low, such as against the Germans at Guinegate. In addition, they were prone to desertion, treason and capitulation.

During the reign of Louis XI the francs-archers performed poorly at the battle of Guinegate while under the command of Marshal Joachim Rouault. Lacking any unit training or discipline, they lost 6,000 men killed in action and many of them looted the enemy camp instead of fighting.

== Franc-archers in literature ==
The franc-archers was a stock figure of fun in literary satire as early as the late 15th century. In these satires the franc-archer is portrayed as vainglorious, cowardly and militarily useless. François Rabelais mocked the francs-archers as cowards in his 1542 edition of Pantagruel. The francs-archers were nicknamed francs-taupins, meaning either "free-moles" or "free-beetles".

== Bibliography ==
- Potter, David (2008). Renaissance France at War: Armies, Culture and Society, c.1480–1560. Woodbridge, Suffolk: Boydell Press. ISBN 978-1-84383-405-2.
