= Lance fournie =

Soldiers that accompanied men-at-arms or knights in battle

The lance fournie (French: "equipped lance") was a medieval equivalent to the modern army squad that would have accompanied and supported a man-at-arms (a heavily armoured horseman popularly known as a "knight") in battle. These units formed companies under a captain either as mercenary bands or in the retinue of wealthy nobles and royalty. Each lance was supposed to include a mixture of troop types (the men-at-arms themselves, lighter cavalry, infantry, and even noncombatant pages) that would have guaranteed a desirable balance between the various components of the company at large; however, it is often difficult to determine the exact composition of the lance in any given company as the available sources are few and often centuries apart.

A lance was usually led and raised by a knight in the service of his liege, yet it is not uncommon in certain periods to have a less privileged man, such as a serjeants-at-arms, lead a lance. More powerful knights, also known as a knight bannerets, could field multiple lances.

== Origins ==
The origins of the lance lie in the retinues of medieval knights (Chaucer's Knight in the Canterbury Tales, with his son the Squire and his archer Yeoman, has similarities to a lance). When called by the liege, the knight would command men from his fief and possibly those of his liege lord or in this latter's stead. Out of the Frankish concept of knighthood, associated with horsemanship and its arms, a correlation slowly evolved between the signature weapon of this rank, the horseman's lance, and the military value of the rank. In other words, when a noble spoke of his ability to field forces, the terms knights and lances became interchangeable.

The lance had no consistent strength of arms throughout its usage as a unit. Different centuries and different states gave it a fluctuating character. However, the basic lance of three men; a knight, a squire who served as a fighting auxiliary, and a non-combatant squire, primarily concerned on the battlefield with looking after the knight's spare horses or lances, seems to evolve in the 13th century An excellent description to convey its relevance is in Howard, "a team of half a dozen men, like the crew of some enormous battle tank". The 13th-century French rule of the Templars had specified that a brother knight should have one squire if he had one warhorse, two if he had an extra one. In addition, he had a riding horse and a packhorse. In battle the squires would follow the brothers with the spare warhorses. A similar arrangement was also seen in Spain in the 1270s, according to Ramon Llull:

Neither horse, nor armour, nor even being chosen by others is sufficient to show forth the high honour that pertains to a Knight. Instead he must be given a squire and a servant to look after his horse

== Organization ==
=== France ===
The term lances fournies itself appeared much the same way as the compagnies d'ordonnance "Les lances fournies pour les compagnies d'ordenance du Roi." or The lances furnished for the companies ordered by the King. Upon the original establishment of the French compagnies d'ordonnance, the lances fournies were formed around a man-at-arms (a fully armored man on an armored horse) with a retinue of a page or squire, two or three archers, and a (slightly) lighter horseman known as the serjeant-at-arms or coutilier (literally "dagger man," a contemporary term for mounted bandits and brigands). All members in a lance were mounted for travel but only the man-at-arms and the coutilier were regularly expected to fight on horseback, though of course both members were also trained and equipped for dismounted action. Lances would be further organized as companies, each company numbering about 100 lances, effectively 400 plus fighting men and servants. These companies were sustained even in peace, and became the first standing army in modern Europe.

=== Burgundy ===
The last Duke of Burgundy, Charles the Bold, made a number of ordinances prescribing the organisation of his forces in the 1460s and 1470s. In the first ordinance of 1468, the army is clearly organised in three man lances; a man-at-arms, a coustillier and a valet. In the Abbeville Ordinance of 1471, the army is re-organised into 1250 lances of nine men each : a man-at-arms, a coustillier, a non-combatant page, three mounted archers and three foot soldiers, namely a crossbowman, handgunner, and pikeman. This organisation is repeated in the 1472 ordinance (substituting the crossbowman for an archer on foot and adding a mounted crossbowman) and 1473 ordinance (keeping the 1472 composition, although the infantry is not described).

=== Brittany ===
The Duchy of Brittany also ordered the equivalent of the lance in an ordinance of 1450. While the basic lance was the familiar three man structure of man-at-arms, coutilier and page, dependent on the wealth of the man-at-arms, additional archers or juzarmiers (that is, men equipped with a guisarme) were added. At the highest income band specified (600–700 livres), either four archers, or three archers and a juzarmier, were added to the basic unit.

=== Italy ===
In Italy in the 14th and 15th centuries, mercenary soldiers were recruited in units known variously as barbuta, lance, or corazza, consisting of two to six men. Although it is traditionally thought that the three man lance was introduced to Italy by the mercenaries of the White Company in the 1360s, in fact they had evolved somewhat earlier. The three man lance consisted of two combatants, a man-at-arms and an armed squire, plus a page. Occasionally, a mounted archer could be substituted for the squire.

In the mid 15th century, soldiers called lanze spezzate, 'broken lances', evolved. These were men who, for some reason, had become detached from their mercenary companies and their lances and were now hired as individuals. They were then placed in new companies and lances under a new commander.

=== Germany ===
In Germany, an indigenous form of the lance known as a gleve (pl. gleven) developed. A gleve may have consisted of as many as ten men – both horse and foot soldiers – supporting the knight. The three-man gleve may have existed in the early 14th century, with a knight supported by two sergeants. Later the sergeants were replaced by mercenaries. The equivalent of the lance of two combatants with page is seen in Germany in the later 14th century, when the second combatant can be a spearman or an archer. However, in various regions, other sizes of gleven existed of up to ten men, including up to three mounted archers (who would dismount to fight) and armed servants who acted as infantry.

=== Poland ===
Kopia (Polish for lance) was the basic military formation in medieval Poland, identical to the lance-unit employed elsewhere in Western Europe. A Kopia was composed of a knight and his retinue (of 3–12 soldiers). On campaign, several kopias were combined to form a larger unit, the chorągiew (pl: banner).

From the 15th century the term kopia was replaced by Poczet.
