= Joachim Rouault =

French soldier

Coat of arms of Joachim Rouault

Joachim Rouault (died 1478), a French soldier, was a member of an old family of Poitou. He attached himself to the Dauphin (afterwards Louis XI) and became his premier squire.

He followed Louis in his expedition against the Swiss in 1444, distinguished himself in the war against England in 1448, and received the posts of governor of Blaye and Fronsac and constable of Bordeaux. After taking an important part in the Battle of Castillon (1453), which resulted in the defeat and death of John Talbot, 1st Earl of Shrewsbury, he fought against Jean V of Armagnac in 1455. In the following year, he made a fruitless expedition into Scotland.

He took part in the campaign in Catalonia, and became Marshal of France in 1461, and governor of Paris in 1471. In 1471 and 1472 he defended Amiens and Beauvais against the Burgundian State. Towards the end of his life, he was disgraced by Louis XI and sentenced to banishment and the confiscation of his property.
