= Coutilier =

Title in Medieval French armies

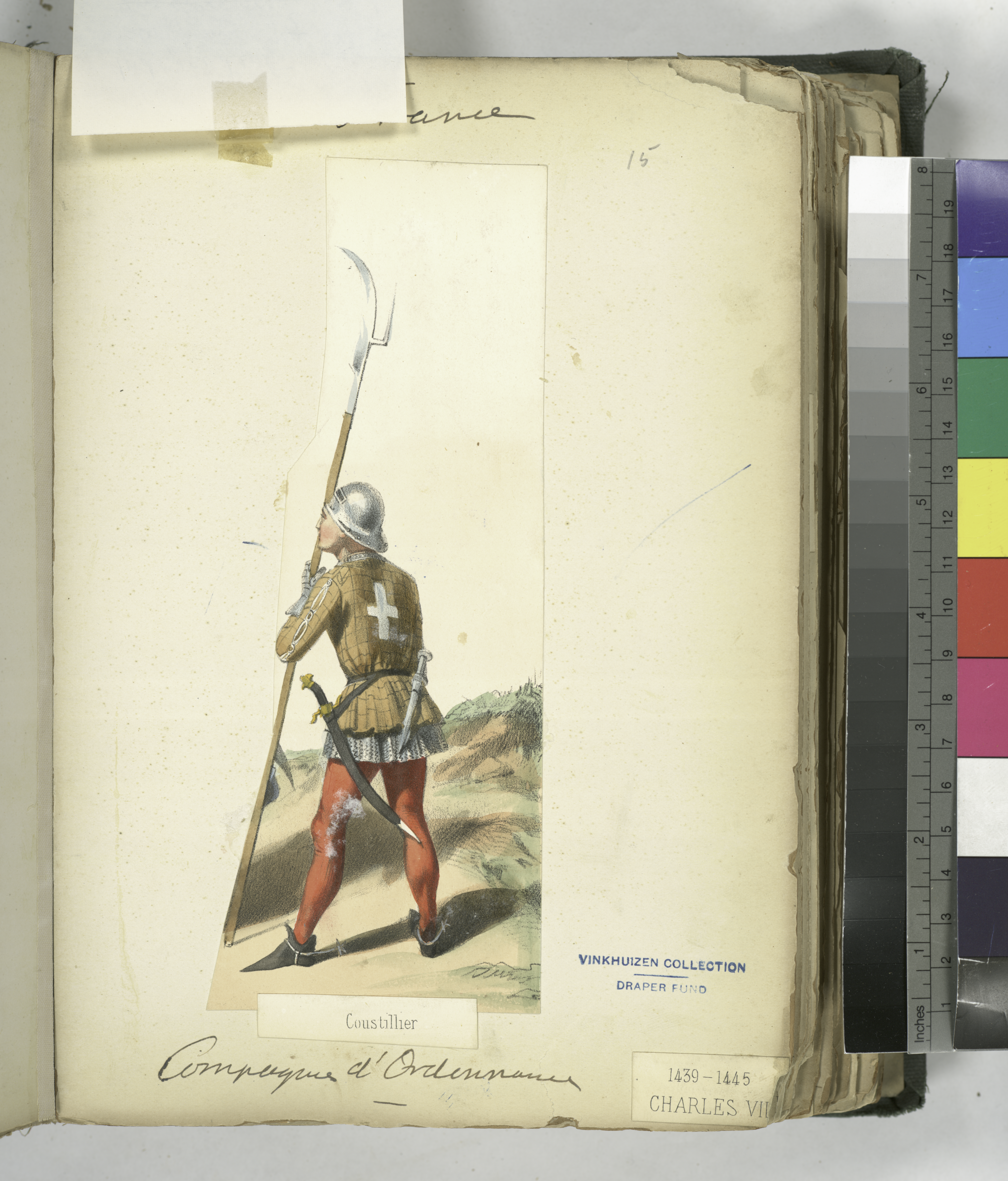
Illustration of the dress of a coutilier c. 1439–45.

The coutilier (also coutillier, coustillier) was a title of a low-ranking professional soldier in Medieval French armies. A coutilier was a member of the immediate entourage of a French knight or a squire called lances fournies. The presence of the coutilier is first recorded in a French Ordinance of 1445. The coutilier also had a place in the Burgundian army of Charles the Bold, being described in detail the military regulations of 1473. Coutiliers are also mentioned in the Breton military regulations of March 1450.

== Equipment ==
The name coutilier seems to derive from their being equipped with a long knife or short sword called a coustille. According to Ewart Oakeshott, the term originally meant a type of infantryman or brigand. However, by the time detailed descriptions appear in the mid-15th century, the coutilier is clearly a lightly armoured horseman. A French coutilier of 1446 was equipped with a helmet, leg armour, a haubergeon, jack or brigandine, a dagger, sword and either a demilance or a voulge. The equipment of a Burgundian coutilier in 1473 is almost identical, with the substitution of a javelin for the demi-lance or voulge (javelin here meaning a light spear, not a throwing weapon). His horse should be worth at least 30 écus.
