= Siege of Toulon (1707) =

1707 siege

Coordinates: 43°07′33″N 05°55′50″E

- Part of the War of the Spanish Succession
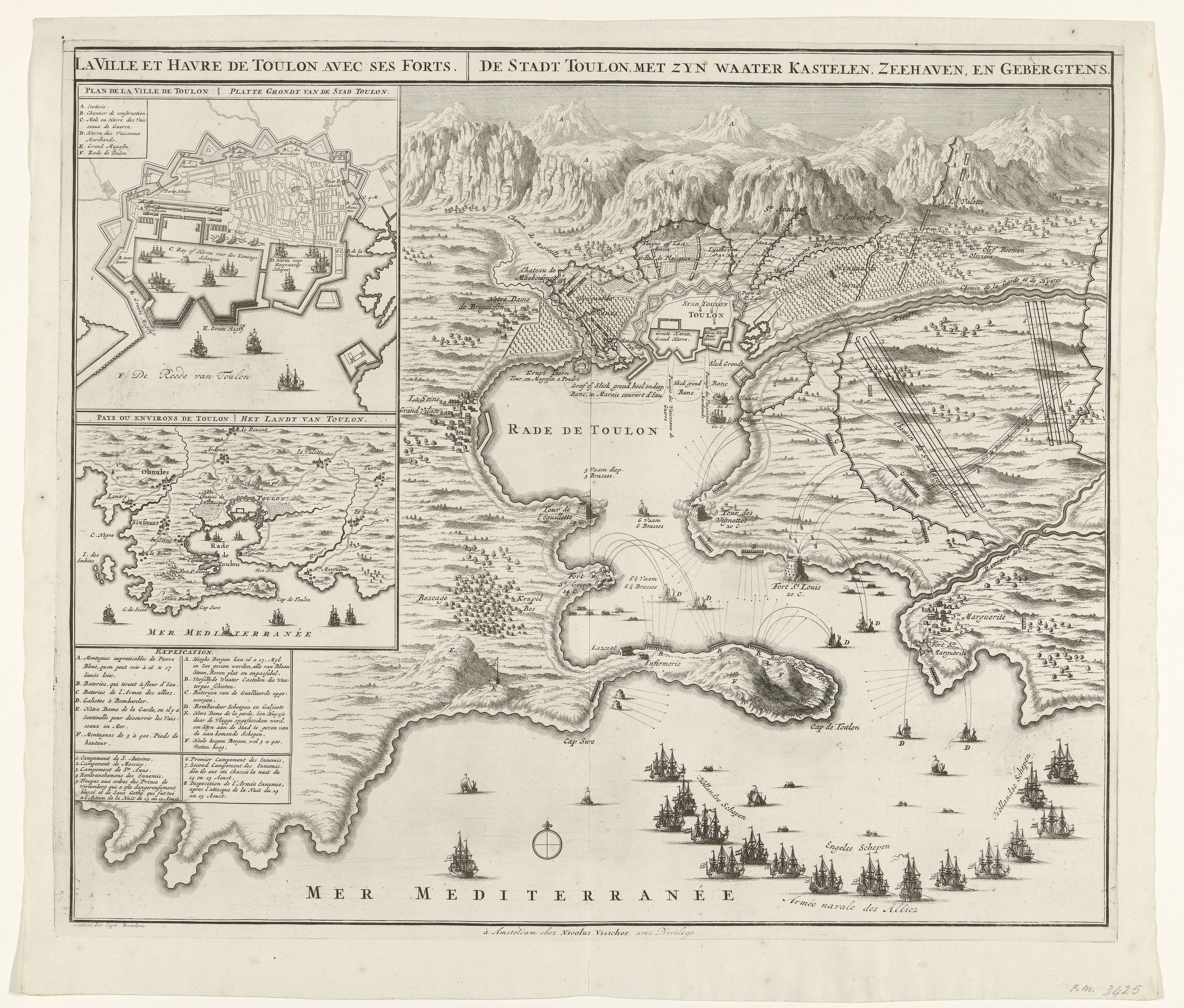
- Map of the siege
Date	29 July – 21 August 1707 (3 weeks and 2 days)
Location	Toulon, France
Result	French victory

Belligerents
Habsburg monarchy Savoy; Great Britain; Dutch Republic	France

Commanders and leaders
Victor Amadeus; Prince Eugene; Cloudesley Shovell; Cornelis Beeckman; Johann Wilhelm of Saxe-Gotha-Altenburg †	Comte de Tessé; Comte de Médavy

Strength
35,000	10,000 garrison 20,000 field force

Casualties and losses
13,000 dead, wounded, deserted or died of disease	Unknown; 46 ships of the line scuttled

The siege of Toulon took place between 29 July and 21 August 1707 during the War of the Spanish Succession, when a combined Savoyard-Imperial army supported by a Anglo-Dutch naval force, attacked the French base at Toulon.

The Allies had insufficient men to institute a formal siege, while they were outnumbered by French land forces; after losing around 13,000 men, mostly from disease, they retreated to Piedmont. The French fleet inside the harbour, including 46 ships of the line, was sunk to prevent its destruction; the fleet would not be re-floated until after the war ended, cementing Anglo-Dutch control of the western Mediterranean.

However, the Allied defeat ended hopes of attacking France through its vulnerable southern border, forcing the Allies into a war of attrition on its much more strongly held northern frontier. The battle's outcome also effectively brought an end to major operations in Italy.

== Background ==
The War of the Spanish Succession was triggered by the death in November 1700 of the childless Charles II of Spain. He named his heir as Philip of Anjou, grandson of Louis XIV of France, and on 16 November 1700, he became king of the Spanish Empire. In addition to mainland Spain, this included the Spanish Netherlands, large parts of Italy, and much of Central and South America. In 1701, disputes over territorial and commercial rights led to war between France, Spain, and the Grand Alliance, whose candidate was Charles, younger son of Leopold I, Holy Roman Emperor.

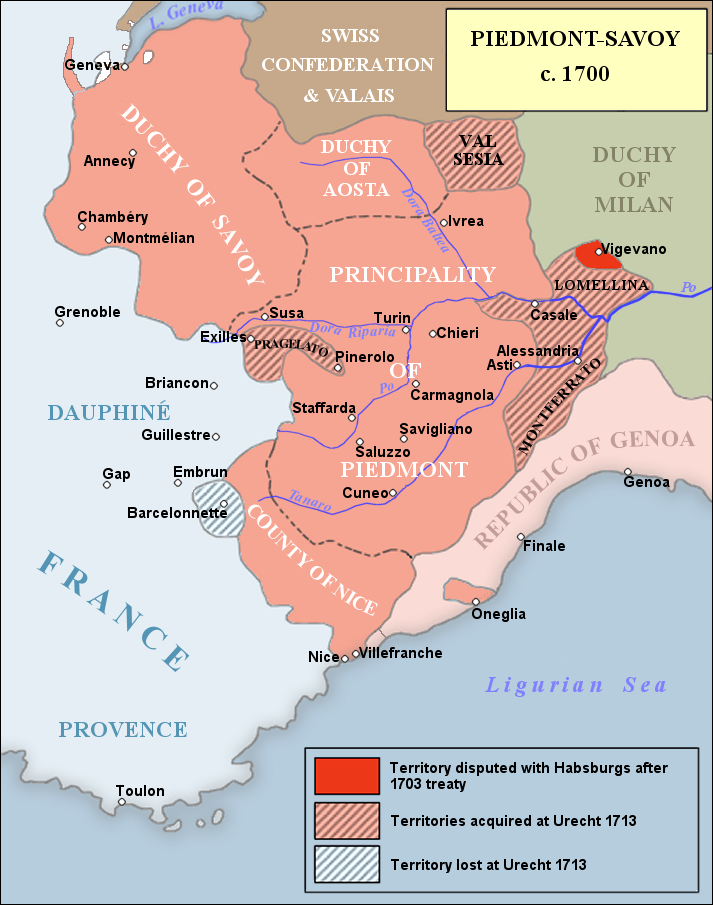
Savoyard state, circa 1700; note Nice and Savoy, today part of France

The war in northern Italy centred on the Spanish-held duchies of Milan and Mantua, which were considered essential for the security of Austria's southern borders. In March 1701, French troops occupied both cities; Victor Amadeus of Savoy allied with France and his daughter Maria Luisa married Philip V. In October 1703, Victor Amadeus renounced his alliance with France, and switched sides. During 1704, French Marshall La Feuillade captured Savoyard territories north of the Alps in Villefranche and the County of Savoy. This was accompanied by an offensive conducted by the duc de Vendôme in Piedmont, and by the end of 1705, Victor Amadeus controlled only his capital of Turin.

The situation changed in July 1706 when Vendôme and any available forces were sent to reinforce France's northern frontier after their defeat at Ramillies. Reinforced by German auxiliaries, Prince Eugene broke the Siege of Turin in September; despite a minor French victory at Castiglione, the war in Italy was over. To the fury of his allies, in the March 1707 Convention of Milan French troops in Lombardy were given free passage to Southern France by Emperor Joseph.

However, it also released Imperial and Savoyard forces for use elsewhere. Sir Richard Hill, English ambassador to Savoy from 1703 to 1706, had been trying to persuade Victor Amadeus to attack the French naval base at Toulon. Its capture would confirm Allied naval supremacy in the Western Mediterranean, support the Protestant Camisard revolt in Southern France, divert Bourbon forces from Spain, and win back Villefranche and Savoy.

== Siege ==
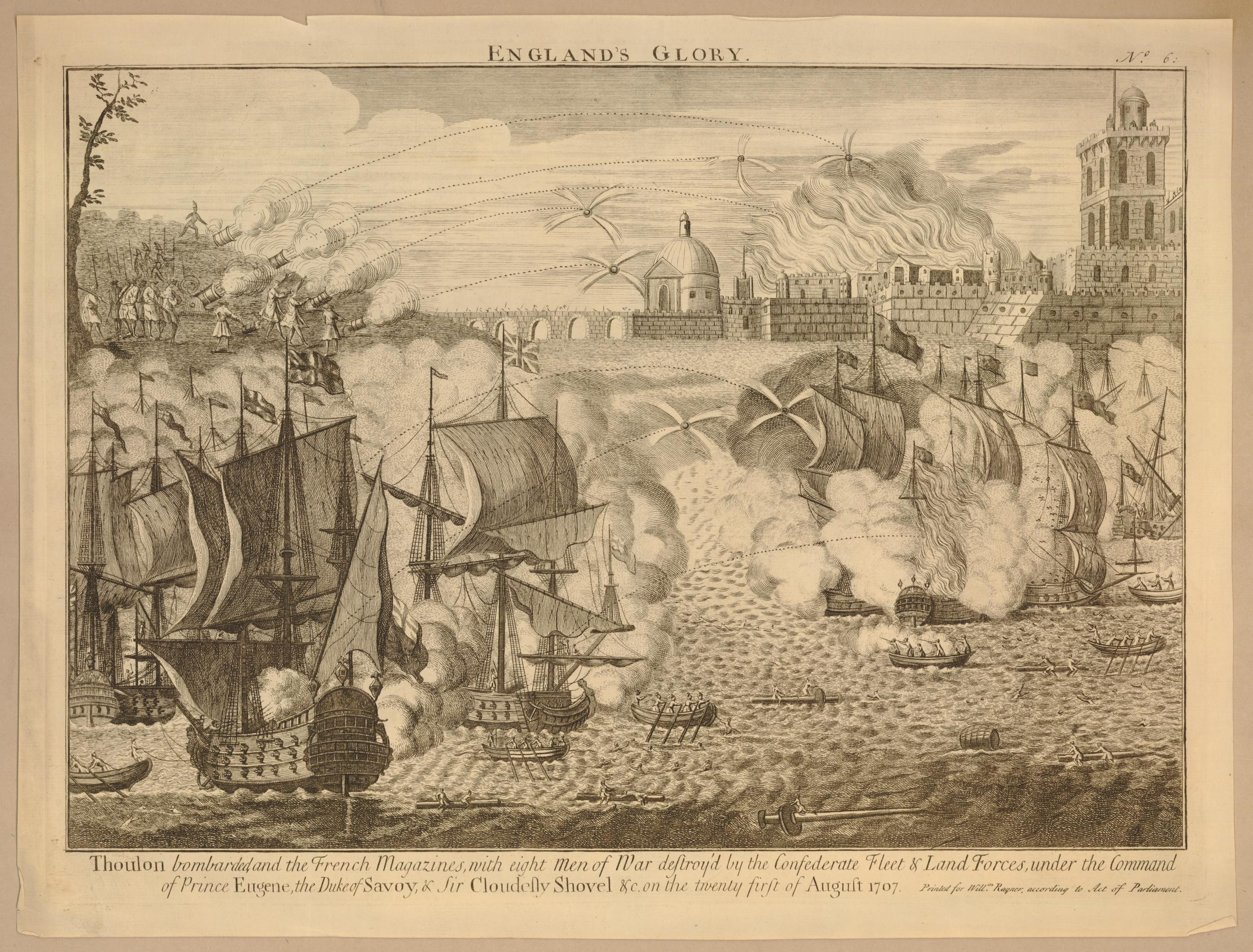
c. 1739 engraving of the siege

By April 1707, the Allies had assembled an army of 35,000 but the campaign was delayed when Emperor Joseph detached 10,000 troops in June to capture Naples, allowing France to strengthen its defences around Toulon. The consolidation of Habsburg power and continuing presence of French garrisons in north-west Piedmont made Victor Amadeus cautious about committing to operations outside Italy, especially since many of the commitments made by Austria in the 1703 Treaty of Turin remained unfulfilled.

Supported by an Anglo-Dutch squadron under Admiral Cloudesley Shovell, Prince Eugene and Victor Amadeus crossed the Alps via the Col de Tende on 6 July. They reoccupied Nice, then marched along the coast from Antibes to Cuers reaching La Valette du Var by late July. However, progress was slow, and victory at Almansa in April allowed the French to send reinforcements from Spain; by the time the Allies arrived at Toulon on 27 July, René de Froulay de Tessé had over 20,000 men based just outside.

Toulon harbour contained forty-six ships of the line, ranging in size from 50 to 110 guns; concerned they might be burnt, Louis XIV ordered them sunk, to be re-floated later, while their guns were removed and mounted in the land defences. Although the Allies had insufficient forces or heavy artillery to mount a formal siege, they captured the heights of Santa Catarina above the port on 6 August, followed by the outworks of Fort Sainte-Marguerite on 10 August. Four days later, Tessé retook the heights, inflicting heavy casualties on the Allies, the dead including Johann Wilhelm of Saxe-Gotha-Altenburg.

The Camisard rising failed to take place, while many of the troops evacuated from Lombardy had been assembled at Riez under the Comte de Médavy, threatening the Allied rear. Although a naval attack captured Fort St Louis on 18 August, thousands of Allied troops were incapacitated by disease, and Prince Eugene and Victor Amadeus agreed to withdraw on 22nd. After loading the siege artillery and as many sick as possible on his ships, Shovell's squadron bombarded the harbour for eighteen hours. He sank two French warships, severely damaged many of those partly sunk, and destroyed the dockyards and naval stores essential for repairing them.

== Aftermath ==
None of the French ships would be available until after the war ended; Louis XIV decided to reallocate money spent on the fleet on strengthening his land forces in Spain. Despite the failed assault on Toulon, the action confirmed Anglo-Dutch naval control of the Western Mediterranean, while the diversion of resources prevented the Bourbons taking full advantage of their victory at Almansa. However, it cost the Allies 13,000 casualties, mostly from disease, and Marlborough considered it a serious strategic defeat. It ended hopes of attacking France through its vulnerable southern border, and forced the Allies into a war of attrition on their strongly held northern frontier.

Prince Eugene and Victor Amadeus recrossed the Alps in early September and expelled the remaining French garrisons in Northwest Piedmont, but Villefranche and the County of Savoy remained in French hands until 1714. Immediately after the siege, the British squadron returned to England; on 22 October 1707, navigational errors caused the loss of four ships and 2,000 men, including Shovell. This led to the 1714 Longitude Act, which offered cash prizes for devising a method of accurately calculating longitude.

== Sources ==
- Atkinson, CT (1951). "The Cathcart MSS; Marlborough's campaigns 1707–1708". Journal of the Society for Army Historical Research. 29 (118). JSTOR 44228612.
- Bancks, John (1745). The history of Francis-Eugene Prince of Savoy (2010 ed.). Gale ECCO. ISBN 1170621236.
- Blackley, William (1845). The Diplomatic Correspondence of the Right Hon. Richard Hill ...: Envoy Extraordinary from the Court of St. James to the Duke of Savoy ... from July 1703, to May 1706 (2010 ed.). Nabu Press. ISBN 1145943462.
- Dhondt, Frederik (2015). De Ruysscher, D; Capelle, K (eds.). History in Legal Doctrine; Vattel and Réal De Curban on the Spanish Succession; the War of the Spanish Succession in Legal history; moving in new directions. Maklu. ISBN 9789046607589.
- Frey, Linda; Frey, Marsha (1995). The Treaties of the War of the Spanish Succession: An Historical and Critical Dictionary. Greenwood. p. 471. ISBN 0313278849.
- Holmes, Richard (2008). Marlborough; England's Fragile Genius. Harper Press. ISBN 978-0007225729.
- Sobel, Dava (1998). Longitude: The True Story of a Lone Genius Who Solved the Greatest Scientific Problem of His Time. Fourth Estate. ISBN 1-85702-571-7.
- Somerset, Anne (2012). Queen Anne; the Politics of Passion. Harper. ISBN 978-0007203765.
- Sundstrom, Roy A (1992). Sidney Godolphin: Servant of the State. EDS Publications Ltd. ISBN 978-0874134384.
- Symcox, Geoffrey (1983). Victor Amadeus II: Absolutism in the Savoyard State, 1675-1730. Thames and Hudson. ISBN 978-0500870105.
