= Lake Fontanej =

Glacial lake in Piedmont, Italy

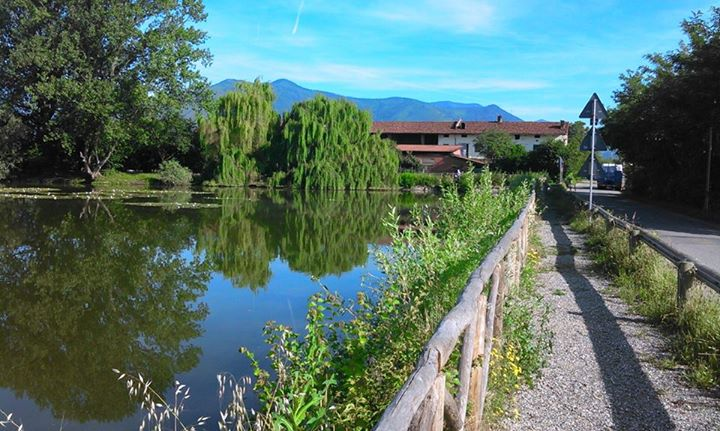
- Interactive map of Lake Fontanej
- Location: Pianezza, Metropolitan City of Turin, Piedmont, Italy
- Coordinates: 45.12201°N 7.52959°E
- Type: Glacial
- Primary inflows: Surface runoff, groundwater springs
- Basin countries: Italy
- Surface elevation: 326 m (1,070 ft)

The Lake Fontanej (Füntanej in Piedmontese) is located in Pianezza, in the Metropolitan City of Turin, at an altitude of 326 meters.

== Geology ==
Its origin is estimated to date back about 400,000 years, following the deposition of clay that made a small morainic depression, carved by the Riparian glacier, impermeable; Currently, the lake is fed by surface waters, mainly runoff ditches, and some groundwater springs.

The small body of water, over the millennia, has risked disappearing several times, but recently the area has undergone a qualification intervention as part of the “Corona Verde” project of the Piedmont Region, whose funds have enabled improvements in the naturalization and accessibility of the area, which is now connected to a cycling network that winds through the entire territory of the Municipality of Pianezza.

== Hiking and fishing ==
A small path bordered by a curtain of trees and bushes completely surrounds the lake; walking it allows one to encounter picturesque views. In the vicinity of the lake, there is a large grassy area equipped with tables and benches for picnics, and not far away is a model airplane flying field; on one side, there is a farmhouse named after Maria Bricca, a popular Pianezzese heroine who, on the night between 5 and 6 September 1706, led Piedmontese soldiers to ford the Dora Riparia and enter through a secret tunnel into the Pianezza castle, where officers assisting the French engaged in the siege of Turin were stationed. Recently, a project to renovate the farmhouse itself (municipally owned) has been launched, which envisages its transformation into a brewery.

The Fontanej is a fairly popular destination for anglers, who can find medium-sized carp, catfish, and pike in the lake. Water lilies flourish in the water, and ducks, coots, and cormorants are regular visitors to the lake.
