= Castiglione delle Stiviere =

- Comune
- Comune di Castiglione delle Stiviere
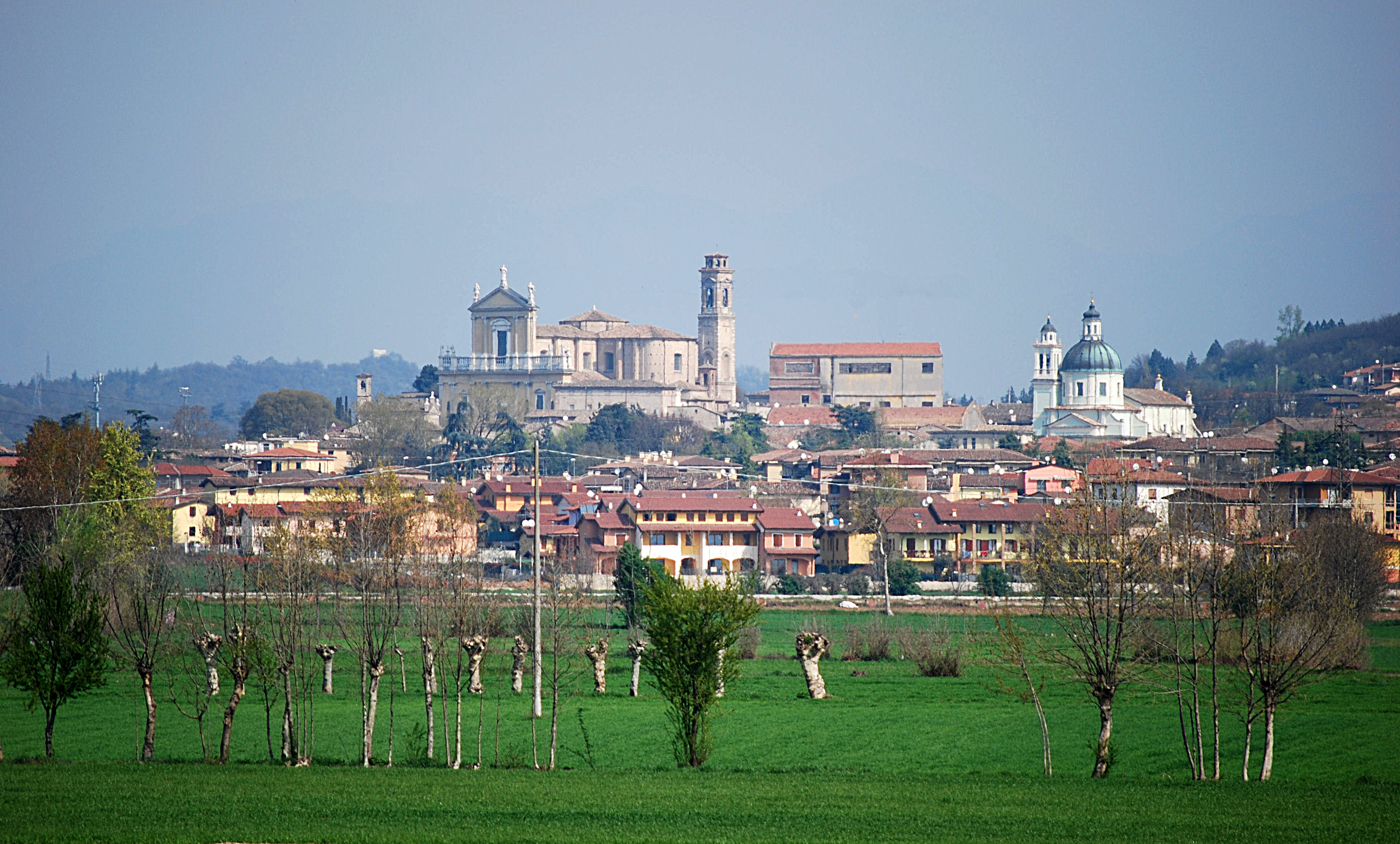

- Coat of arms

- Location within Italy Location within Lombardy
- Coordinates: 45°23′30″N 10°29′20″E
- Country: Italy
- Region: Lombardy
- Province: Mantua (MN)
- Frazioni: Astore, Gozzolina, Grole, San Vigilio

Government
  - Mayor: Enrico Volpi

Area
  - Total: 42.02 km^{2} (16.22 sq mi)
- Elevation: 111 m (364 ft)

Population (31 August 2017)
  - Total: 23,448
  - Density: 558.0/km^{2} (1,445/sq mi)
- Demonym: Castiglionese (pl: Castiglionesi)
- Time zone: UTC+1 (CET)
  - Summer (DST): UTC+2 (CEST)
- Postal code: 46043
- Dialing code: 0376
- Patron saint: St. Aloysius Gonzaga
- Saint day: June 21
- Website: Official website

Castiglione delle Stiviere (Italian pronunciation: [kastiʎˈʎoːne delle ˈstivjeːre]) or simply Castiglione (Upper Mantuan: Castiù or Castigliòn), is a town and commune in the Province of Mantua, in the region of Lombardy, Italy, 30 kilometres (19 miles) northwest of the city of Mantua by road.

== History ==
The town's castle was home to a cadet branch of the House of Gonzaga, headed by the Marquis of Castiglione. Saint Aloysius Gonzaga (1568–1591) was born there as heir to the marquisate, but became a Jesuit. He died tending plague victims in Rome and was buried there, but his head was later translated to the basilica in Castiglione which bears his name.

During the War of the Spanish Succession, the French under the duc de Vendôme occupied the town. In 1706, in the first Battle of Castiglione a French army under Jacques Eléonor Rouxel de Grancey defeated here a Hessian army led by Frederick I, Landgrave of Hesse-Kassel.

During the siege of Mantua in 1796, the Austrians under Dagobert Sigmund von Wurmser were defeated here in the second Battle of Castiglione by the revolutionary French army under General Augereau, later Marshal of France, who in 1808 was created Duke of Castiglione by Emperor Napoleon I, a hereditary victory title (so there never was an actual territorial duchy attached to it) extinguished in 1915.

Castiglione received the honorary title of city by presidential decree on 18 October 2001.

== Main sights ==
It has an old castle, much altered and restored, especially by the Gonzaga family of Mantua in the 16th century.

The Fountain of Domenica Calubina is a small hexagonal fountain in the piazza Dallò in the center of the town.

Castiglione is the birthplace of the International Red Cross, which was established by Henri Dunant during the aftermath of the Battle of Solferino in 1859. There is a museum in the center of the town dedicated to the IRC.

== International relations ==
Castiglione delle Stiviere is twinned with:

- Barentin, France
- Leutkirch im Allgäu, Germany, since 1995
- Monteprandone, Italy
