= Cornelis Beeckman =

Dutch States Navy officer

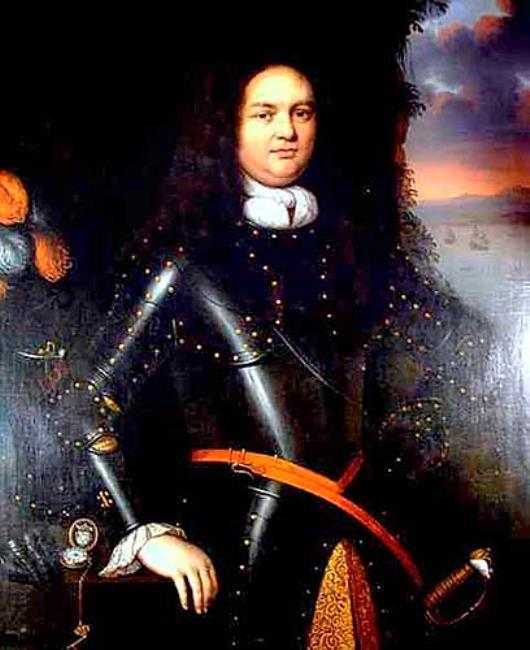
- Cornelis Beeckman

Captain of Amsterdam
- In office 1693–1709

Schout-bij-nacht of Amsterdam
- In office 1709–1716

Personal details
- Born: 1662
- Died: 1716 (aged 53–54)

Military service
- Allegiance: Dutch Republic
- Rank: Admiral
- Battles/wars: Nine Years' War; Great Northern War; War of the Spanish Succession; Battle of Cádiz; Battle of Vigo Bay; Capture of Gibraltar; Siege of Gibraltar; Battle of Cabrita Point; Siege of Toulon; Capture of Minorca

Cornelis Beeckman (1662 – 1716) was a Dutch States Navy officer during the 17th and 18th centuries. He took part in the Nine Years' War and the War of the Spanish Succession and ended his military career at the rank of Schout-bij-nacht.

== Biography ==
Cornelis Beeckman became a captain in the Admiralty of Amsterdam in 1693, during the Nine Years' War, having probably served in a lesser rank in earlier years. As such, he was with the fleet of Lieutenant-Admiral Gerard Callenburgh in 1694 which liberated Barcelona and shelled Palamos. Likewise, he commanded a ship of war in the large fleet commanded by Lieutenant-Admiral van Philips van Almonde, with which the coasts of France were kept in turmoil in 1696 and commanded the Gouda of 64 pieces in the shelling of Copenhagen in 1700.

More praise and distinction were gained by Beeckman in the War of the Spanish Succession the campaign to Cádiz, which, although unsuccessful, led to the triumph at Vigo in 1702, where a French squadron was destroyed and all the Spanish merchantmen lying there were burned or taken. He also distinguished himself in shelling Gibraltar, which was conquered by the English and Dutch. He also twice helped to relieve Gibraltar while it was under siege and played an honourable part in the destruction of several French ships under the command of de Pointis. Beeckman's zeal and courage earned him command of the Prins Willem, a ship of 92 pieces, with which he collaborated in the Mediterranean Sea during the war of succession to the attack against Toulon, helped disperse an enemy convoy and conquer the islands of Sardinia and Minorca. Twice, in 1706 and 1709, he commanded a squadron of eight ships to protect the East Indies Return Fleet of the VOC, with no higher rank than that of captain. That of 1709 was his last sea voyage. After having been overlooked for long, he finally obtained the rank of Schout-bij-nacht, but he died shortly after his promotion in 1716.

== Sources ==
- Van der Aa, Abraham Jacob (1854). "Cornelis Beeckman". Biographisch woordenboek der Nederlanden. Deel 2. Eerste en tweede stuk.
