= Fountain of Domenica Calubina =

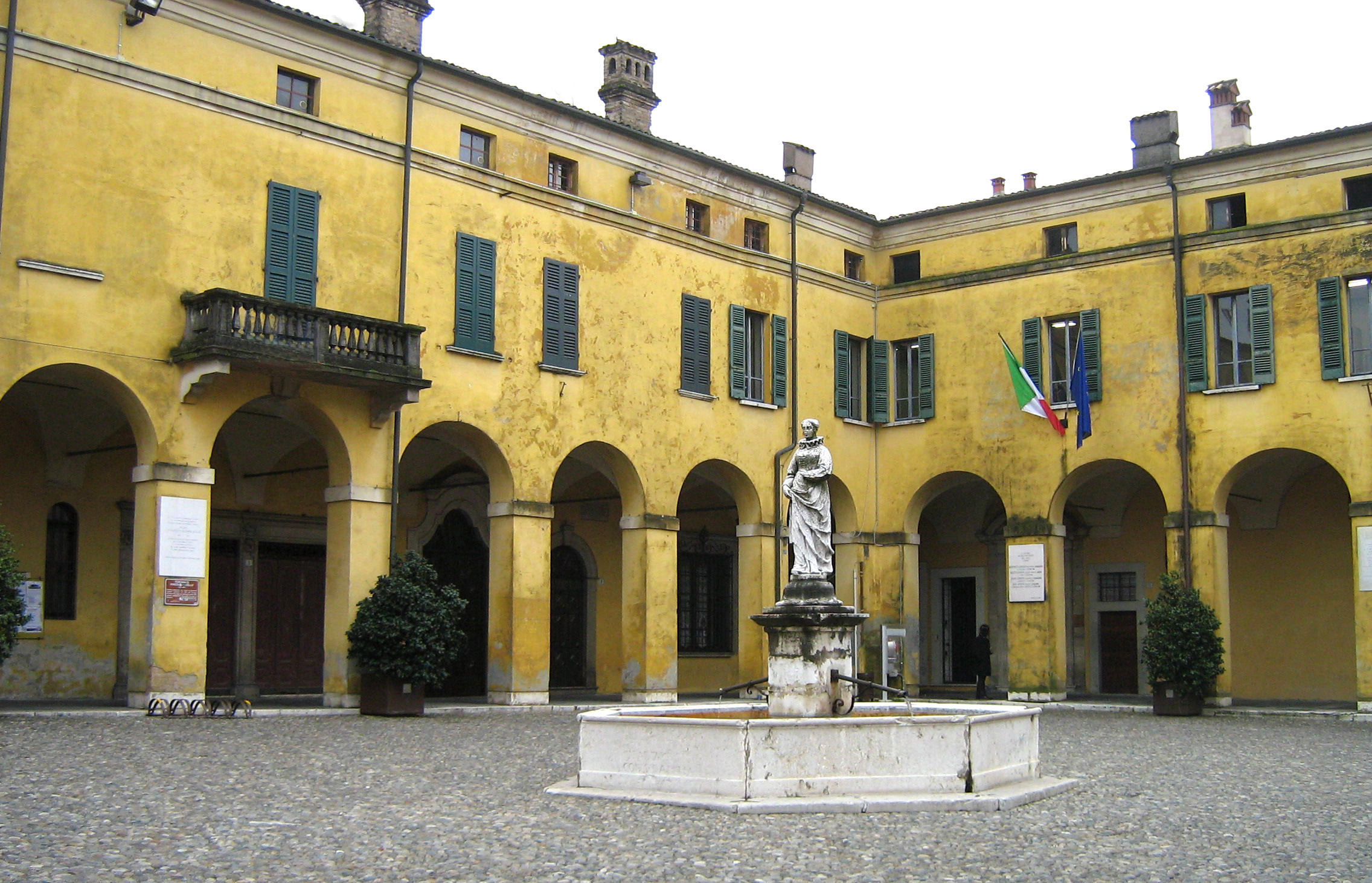
Fountain of Domenica Calubina

The Fountain of Domenica Calubina is a small hexagonal fountain in the piazza Dallò in the center of the town of Castiglione delle Stiviere, province of Mantua, region of Lombardy, Italy. In the center, atop a pillar is a worn marble statue of a woman, likely pregnant and holding a hand to her abdomen, dressed in late-15th century garb with a ruff around the neck. Tradition as stated by the Latin inscription on the base is that it represents Domenica Calubina, who loved better to die than dishonor herself.

Few details of the story can be found; the base of the statue appears to be stamped with the date 1733 and the sculptor is unclear. The story is described as that of the Lombard Lucretia; it has echoes in the Marian veneration in Italy. A paraphrase of Spallicci's short paragraph on the 15th-century story is:

that this handsome woman, born in Castiglione, was the delight of all those who knew her. She was unfortunate in choosing her lover; for one evening finding her alone, sought to insult her in honor. She not only denied his claims, but bitterly reproached the lover, who blinded by anger, killed her.
