= Pietro Micca =

Italian soldier (1677–1706)

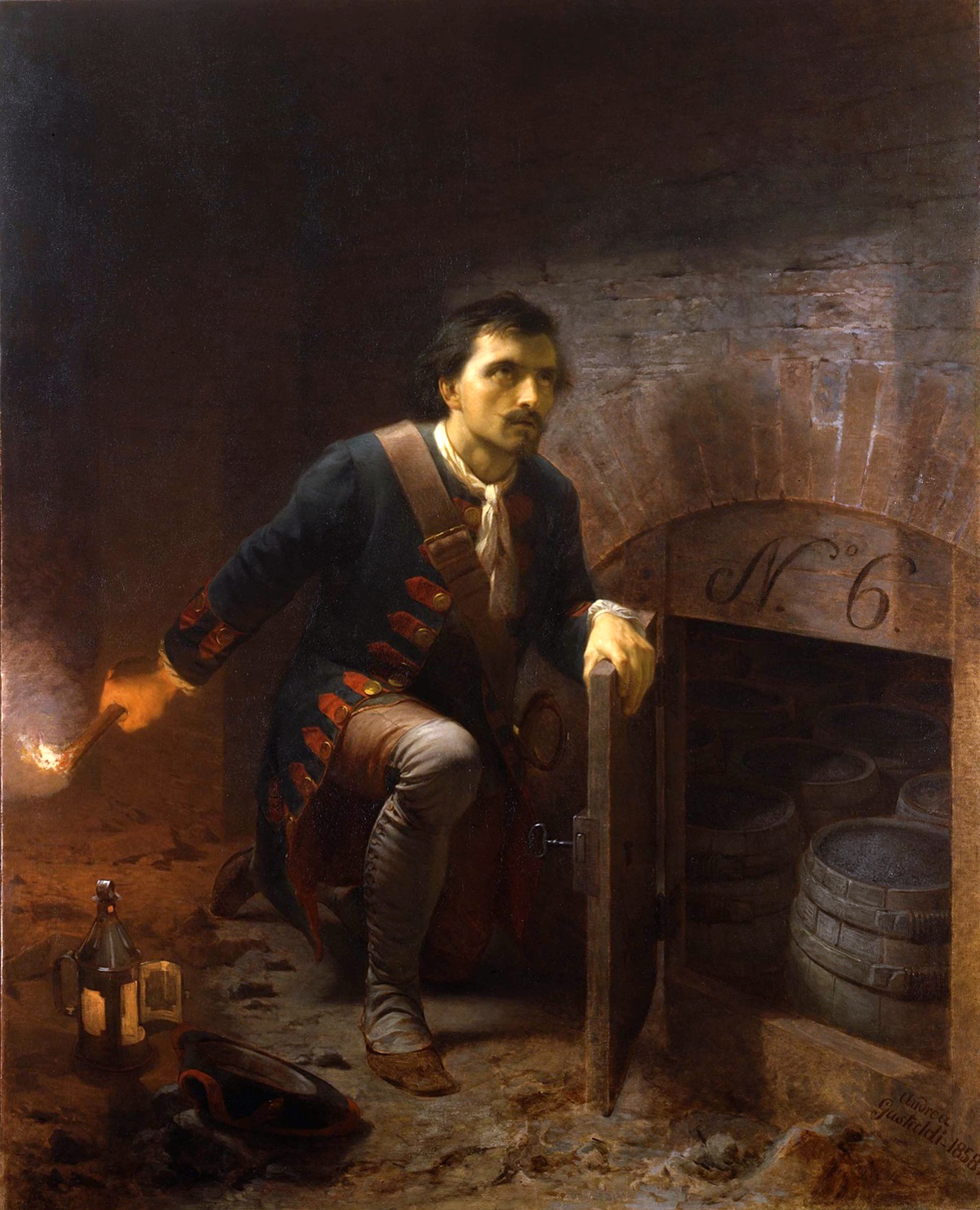
- 1858 portrait of Micca by Andrea Gastaldi
- Born: 6 March 1677; Sagliano, Duchy of Savoy
- Died: 30 August 1706; Turin, Duchy of Savoy
- Spouse: Maria Cattarina Bonino (m. 1704)
- Children: 1
- Military career
- Allegiance: Duchy of Savoy
- Branch: Savoyard Army
- Rank: Private
- Nickname: Pierre Micha
- Unit: Sappers
- Conflicts: War of the Spanish Succession; Siege of Turin †

Private Pietro Micca (6 March 1677 – 30 August 1706), also known as Pierre Micha, was an Italian soldier who became a national hero of the Duchy of Savoy for sacrificing himself during the siege of Turin of the War of Spanish Succession. Serving as a sapper in the Savoyard Army, he prevented a breakthrough by French grenadiers by lighting two gunpowder barrels at the cost of his life.

== Early and personal life ==
Micca was born at Sagliano, now Sagliano Micca, Piedmont, near the town of Biella. His father was bricklayer Giacomo Micca, a native of Sagliano and his mother was Anna Martinazzo, of the Riabella frazione of San Paolo Cervo.

On 29 October 1704 Micca married Maria Cattarina Bonino and the marriage produced one son, Giacomo Antonio (1705–1733). Micca initially worked as a bricklayer before enrolling as a sapper in the Sabaudian army which was then engaged in the War of the Spanish Succession (1702–1714).

== Military action and death ==
Micca was enlisted into the Savoyard Army as a sapper at the rank of private; he was nicknamed Passepartout. During the siege of Turin, Micca was employed as a tunneller and bricklayer in the military mines, which ran under the citadel. The mines were designed to detect Franco-Spanish attempts to dig under the citadel and to neutralize them by blowing them up. For this purpose, barrels of gunpowder were placed in strategic places around the network of mines.

On the night of 29–30 August 1706, a party of French grenadiers crept into a large trench, which had been the site of a failed assault on the citadel. The Piemontese had lit bonfires in the trench to burn dead bodies, and this meant that the French grenadiers were not seen. The French attacked a small number of Savoyard soldiers at the base of the trench, who were guarding an entrance to the Savoyard mines. The attackers killed them and entered the upper level of the mines.

On hearing the French attack, Micca and a comrade barred a door at the top of the steps leading down to the lower level of the mines. As the French grenadiers attempted to break down the door, Micca sent away his comrade, lit a very short fuse and placed it in two barrels of gunpowder behind the door. The gunpowder exploded as the French grenadiers broke down the door, killing or injuring most of them. Micca was severely injured in the explosion and died due to his injuries and poisonous carbon dioxide gas, which had been released by the exploding gunpowder. Had the French grenadiers reached the lower level of the mines, they could have entered the heart of the citadel and the city itself. Micca's sacrifice prevented this, and the French assault was repulsed with heavy losses. A few days later, the steps where Micca had exploded the bomb were quickly bricked over. Micca's body was buried in a mass grave.

== Memorial and archaeology ==
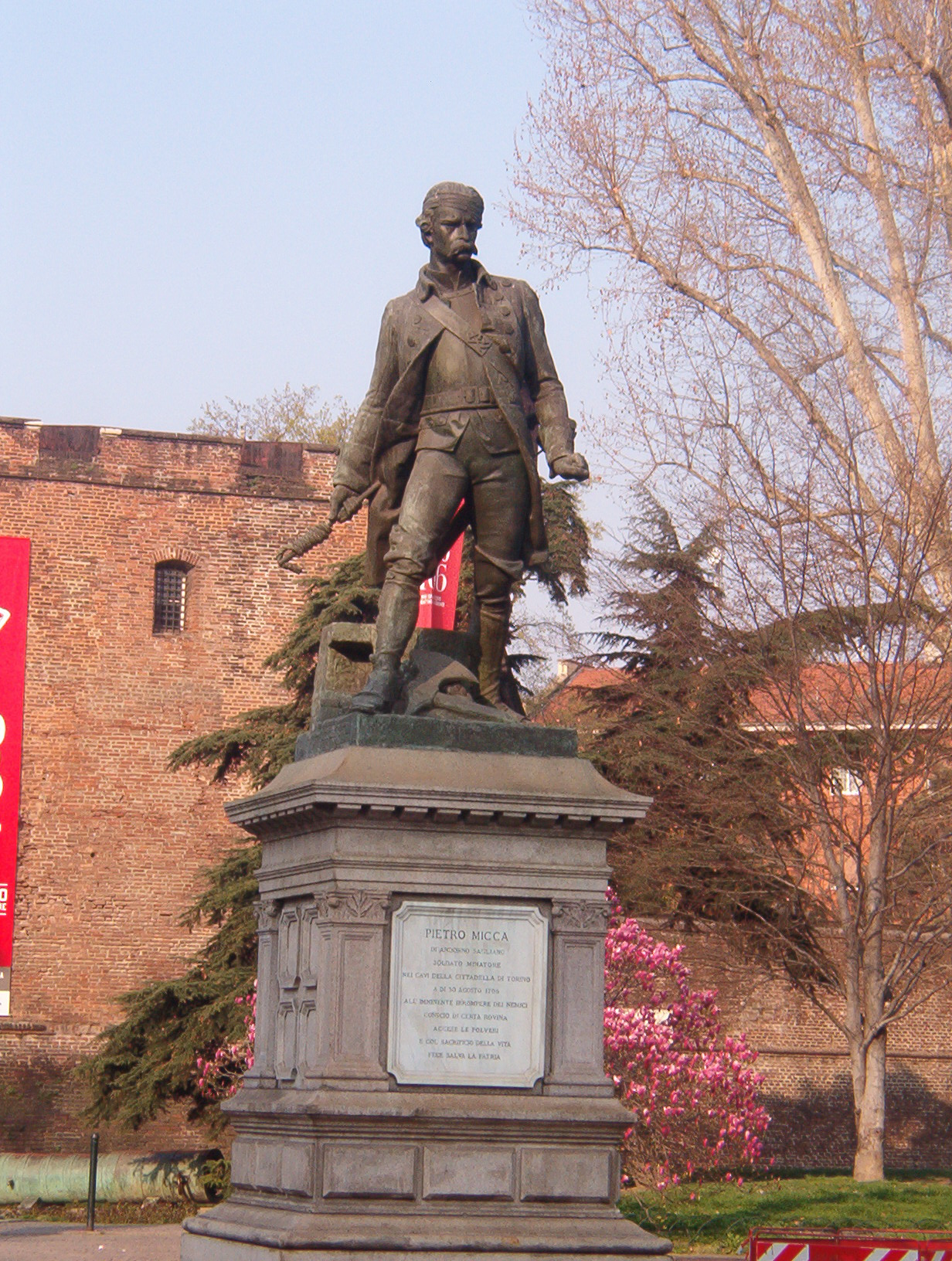
Monument to Pietro Micca in Turin

In 1958, Captain (later General) Guido Amoretti discovered the bricked-up 'Pietro Micca steps' and these form the centre-piece of the network of military mines, which can be visited at the Museo Civico Pietro Micca (the Civic Museum of Pietro Micca and the siege of Turin). The remnants of the attackers' grenades, knives and other personal equipment were discovered, and are displayed at the museum.

Micca's heroism has been the subject of poems, plays and romances. However, according to Count Giuseppe Solaro della Margherita, the commander of the Turin garrison at the time, it was through a miscalculation of the pace of the fuse, and not by deliberate intent, that he sacrificed his life. As well as the Museo Civico Pietro Micca, a central street in Turin was named after him, and a statue was erected in his honour. His home town was renamed from Andorno to Andorno Micca. In 1938 a film Pietro Micca was produced, focusing on his actions during the siege of Turin.

== Bibliography ==
- Bianchi, Paola (2010). "MICCA, Pietro". Dizionario Biografico degli Italiani (in Italian). Vol. 74: Messi–Miraglia. Rome: Istituto dell'Enciclopedia Italiana. ISBN 978-88-12-00032-6.
- Manno, Antonio (1883). "Pietro Micca ed il Generale Solaro de la Margarita". Miscellanea di Storia Italiana. XXI: 313–534.
