= Maria Bricca =

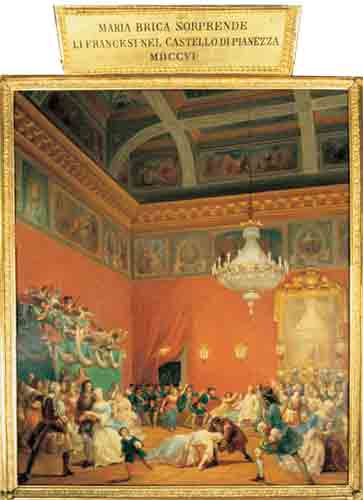
Maria Bricca-Gonin

Maria Bricca (1684-1733), was a cook and war heroine from the Duchy of Savoy. She played a role in the War of the Spanish succession. She was a cook living near the Pianezza Fortress in the Duchy of Savoy. She assisted Prince Eugene of Savoy to conquer the fortress during the Siege of Turin (1705) in the War of the Spanish Succession and was hailed as a war heroine and subject of several legends. She is the subject of the film Pianezza 1706 - Maria Bricca (2010).
