= Convention of Milan =

1707 agreement between France and Habsburg Austria ending fighting in Northern Italy

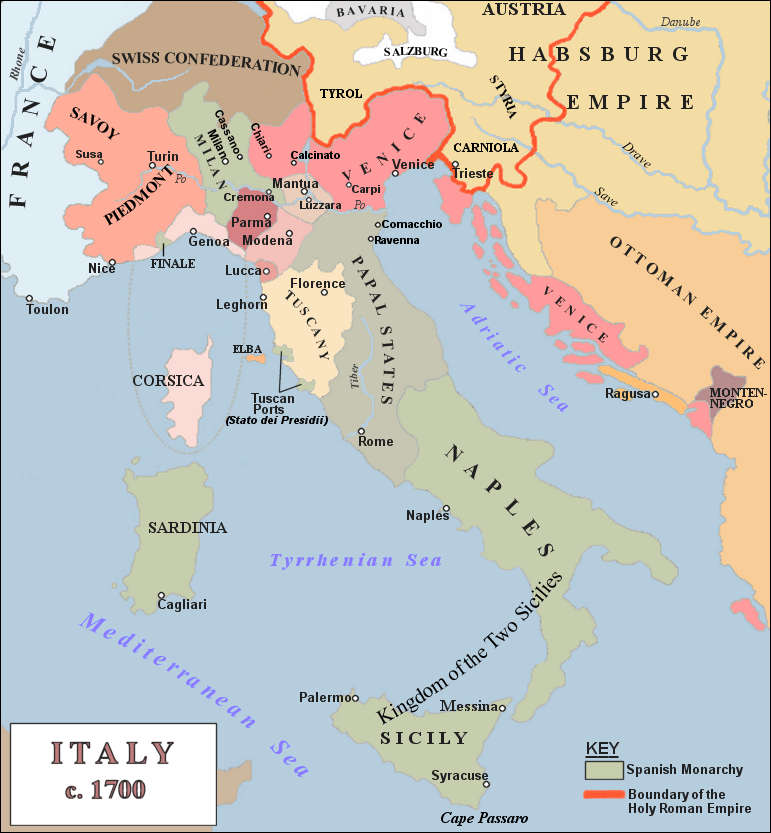
- Italy 1700; Spanish-controlled territories in green
- Signed: 13 March 1707
- Location: Milan
- Original signatories: Prince de Vaudémont; (Habsburg monarchy) Prince Eugene of Savoy
- Parties: France; Bourbon Spain; Habsburg monarchy
- Languages: French

The Convention of Milan, signed on 13 March 1707 during the War of the Spanish Succession, was an agreement between France and Austria which ended the fighting in Northern Italy. The French were allowed to withdraw their remaining forces undisturbed and in return handed control of any towns they still held to the Austrian commander Prince Eugene of Savoy.

== Background ==
Habsburg Spain, had dominated Italy since the Peace of Cateau-Cambrésis in 1559; their possessions included the kingdoms of Sardinia, Naples and Sicily, along with a number of territories in the north, the most important being the Duchy of Milan. By 1700, this position was increasingly threatened by the general decline of Spanish power, Italian resentment over decades of heavy taxation to pay for their wars, and the rise of Savoy.

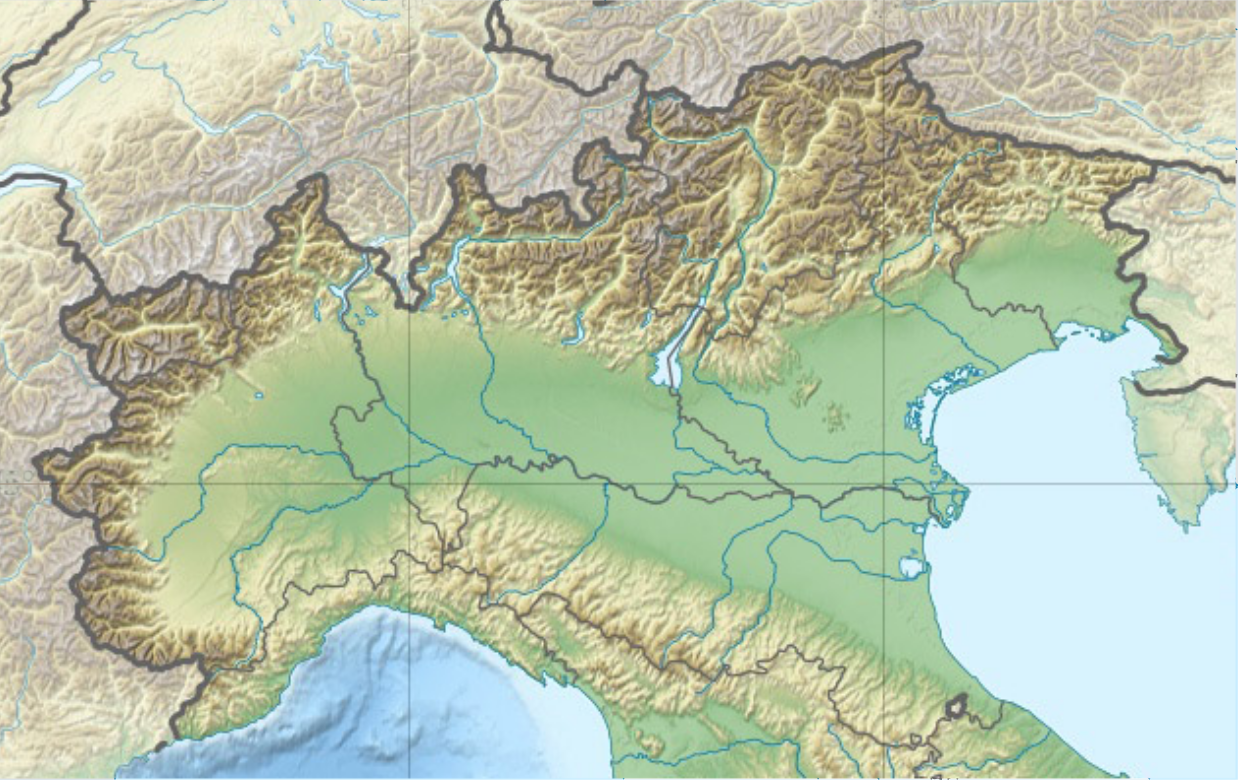
Key locations in Northern Italy

When Charles II of Spain, the last Habsburg ruler of the Spanish Empire, died in November 1700 without children, he left his throne to Philip of Anjou, the younger grandson of Louis XIV of France, who became Philip V of Spain. In early 1701, French troops occupied Milan and Mantua on his behalf and Louis XIV allied with Victor Amadeus of Savoy, whose daughter Maria Luisa married Philip. These actions led to the outbreak of the War of the Spanish Succession in July.

Possession of these territories allowed the Franco-Spanish Bourbon alliance to threaten the Archduchy of Austria, the heartland of the Habsburg monarchy. This led Emperor Leopold to despatch an Imperial army into Italy commanded by his best general, Prince Eugene of Savoy, who by February 1702 had regained control of most of Lombardy. However, the collapse of Imperial finances in 1703 and a Hungarian revolt forced Leopold to withdraw his troops and allowed the Franco-Spanish alliance to recover most of their losses.

Although Victor Amadeus switched sides in October 1703, by the beginning of 1705 Savoy was close to defeat and Prince Eugene was sent back to Italy by Emperor Joseph, who had succeeded his father in May. Much of his army consisted of German mercenaries funded by England and the Dutch Republic. With their help, Prince Eugene broke the Siege of Turin in September, then seized Milan; despite a minor victory at Castiglione on 8 September, French forces in Italy were now cut off from France. In February 1707, Modena surrendered to Imperial forces, leaving Mantua as the only significant city still held by the Franco-Spanish alliance.

== Provisions ==
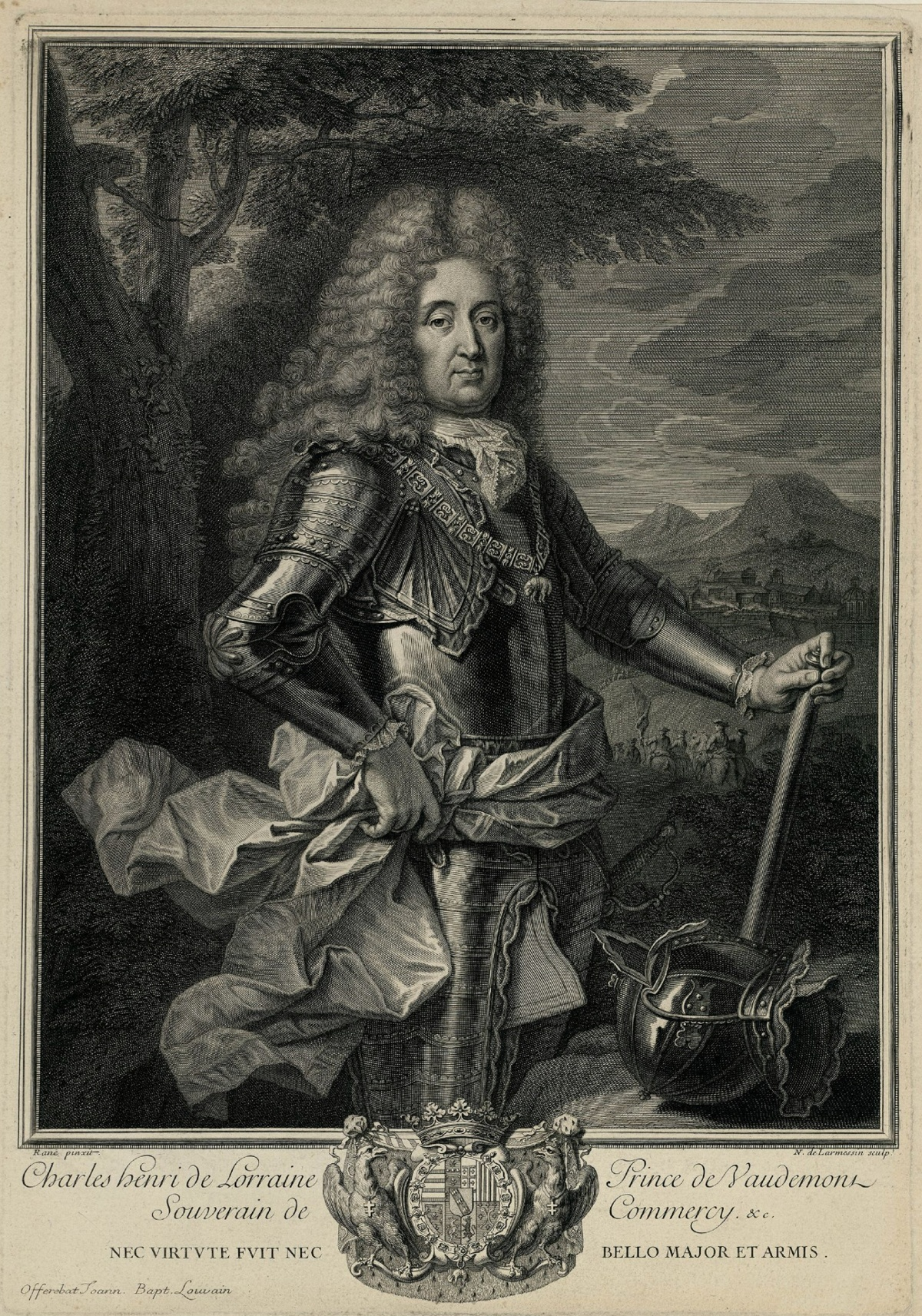
Prince de Vaudémont, the last Spanish Governor of Milan who negotiated the Convention

The War of the Spanish Succession was fought in a number of linked but separate theatres, the most important being those in Northern Italy, the Low Countries and Spain, where the Allies were backing the claim of Archduke Charles, younger brother of Emperor Joseph. However, the Austrian Habsburgs viewed Italy as more important to their long-term security than Spain and it was their refusal to agree the cession of Naples, Sicily and Milan to France that led to the failure of the Treaty of London (1700) and the outbreak of war in 1701.

By 1706, the Bourbon alliance was under immense pressure both in Flanders, following a heavy defeat at Ramillies in July, and in Spain, where the Allies captured Madrid before being forced to retreat in October. Success in Northern Italy meant they now planned an attack on the French naval base at Toulon, in which Savoyard and Imperial land forces would be supported by the Royal Navy. Its capture would confirm Allied naval supremacy in the western Mediterranean Sea, allow them to support the Protestant Camisard revolt in Southern France, divert Bourbon forces from Spain, and regain the French-occupied Savoyard territories of Villefranche and the County of Savoy.

Having decided to cut his losses in Italy, Louis opened negotiations with Emperor Joseph, using the Prince de Vaudémont, the last Spanish Governor of Milan and Governor-General of Lombardy. From his base in Mantua, during the winter of 1706/1707 Vaudémont began secret talks with Prince Eugene to withdraw all remaining Bourbon forces from Italy for use elsewhere. On 13 March 1707, they signed the Convention of Milan, which allowed all remaining Franco-Spanish troops free passage into France; in return, Vaudémont ceded the Spanish Duchies of Milan and Mantua to Austria.

== Aftermath ==
Although the Convention ensured Austrian domination of Italy with minimal expense and thus made strategic sense for Emperor Joseph, his Allies reacted with fury. The English and Dutch had largely financed Prince Eugene's army while Victor Amadeus had expected to gain Milan but it also allowed France to withdraw nearly 30,000 troops for use elsewhere. Many of those evacuated from Lombardy played a key role in defeating the Allied attack on Toulon in August 1707, which Marlborough considered a serious strategic defeat. It ended hopes of attacking France through its vulnerable southern border, forcing the Allies into a war of attrition on their strongly held northern frontier.

== Sources ==
- Blackley, William (1845). The Diplomatic Correspondence of the Right Hon. Richard Hill ...: Envoy Extraordinary from the Court of St. James to the Duke of Savoy ... from July 1703, to May 1706 (2010 ed.). Nabu Press. ISBN 1145943462.
- Coynart, Charles de (1914). Le chevalier de Folard, 1669-1752 (in French). Librairie Hatchette.
- Dhondt, Frederik (2015). De Ruysscher, D.; Capelle, K. (eds.). History in Legal Doctrine; Vattel and Réal De Curban on the Spanish Succession; the War of the Spanish Succession in Legal history; moving in new directions. Maklu. ISBN 9789046607589.
- Frey, Linda; Frey, Marsha, eds. (1995). The Treaties of the War of the Spanish Succession: An Historical and Critical Dictionary. Greenwood. ISBN 978-0313278846.
- Holmes, Richard (2008). Marlborough; England's Fragile Genius. Harper Press. ISBN 978-0007225729.
- Kamen, Henry (2002). Spain's Road to Empire: The Making of a World Power, 1492-1763. Allen Lane. ISBN 978-0713993653.
- Lynn, John (1999). The Wars of Louis XIV, 1667–1714 (Modern Wars in Perspective). Longman. ISBN 978-0582056299.
- Rule, John (2017). Onnenkirk, David; Mijers, Esther (eds.). The Partition Treaties, 1698-1700 in A European View in Redefining William III: The Impact of the King-Stadholder in International Context. Routledge. ISBN 978-1138257962.
- Sundstrom, Roy A. (1992). Sidney Godolphin: Servant of the State. EDS Publications Ltd. ISBN 978-0874134384.
- Wilson, Peter (1998). German Armies: War and German Society, 1648-1806. Routledge. ISBN 1857281063.
- Wilson, Peter (2016). The Holy Roman Empire: A Thousand Years of Europe's History. Allen Lane. ISBN 978-1846143182.
