= Jacques Eléonor Rouxel de Grancey =

French military officer and Marshal of France

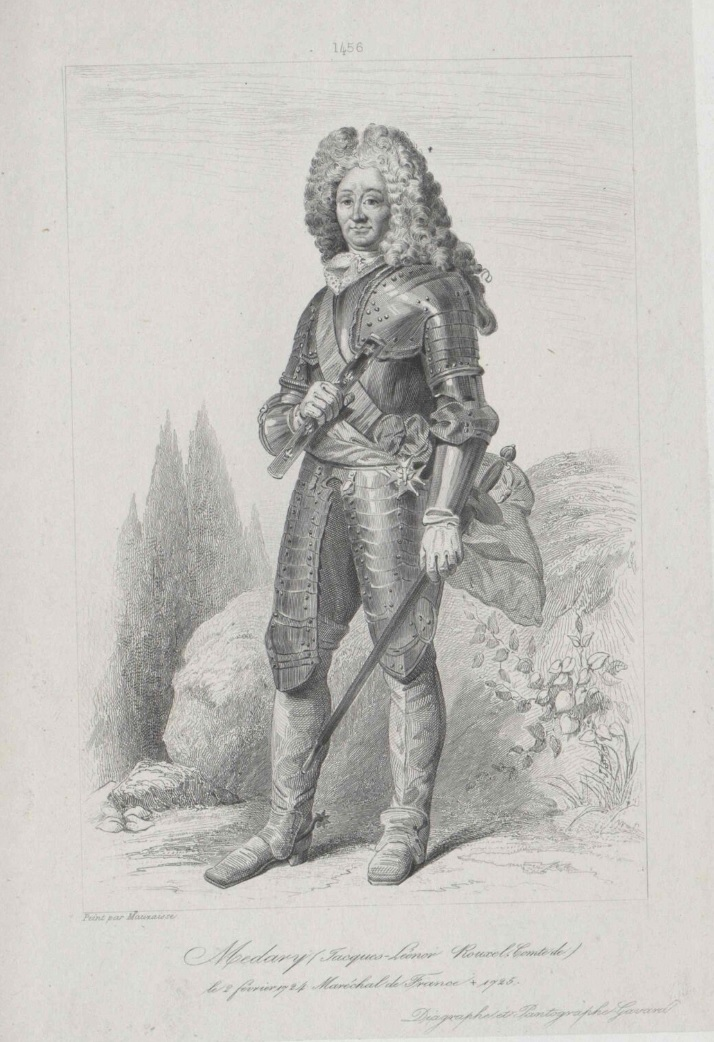
- Jacques-Léonor Rouxel de Grancey, comte de Médavy
- Born: 31 May 1655; Chalancey Champagne (province), France
- Died: 6 November 1725 (aged 70); Paris
- Military career
- Allegiance: France
- Service years: 1673–1713
- Rank: Marshal of France
- Unit: Cavalry
- Conflicts: Seneffe (1674); Konzer Brücke (1675); Marsaglia (1693); Luzzara (1702); Cassano (1705); Turin (1706); Castiglione (1706); Toulon (1707)
- Awards: Chevalier de Saint Esprit

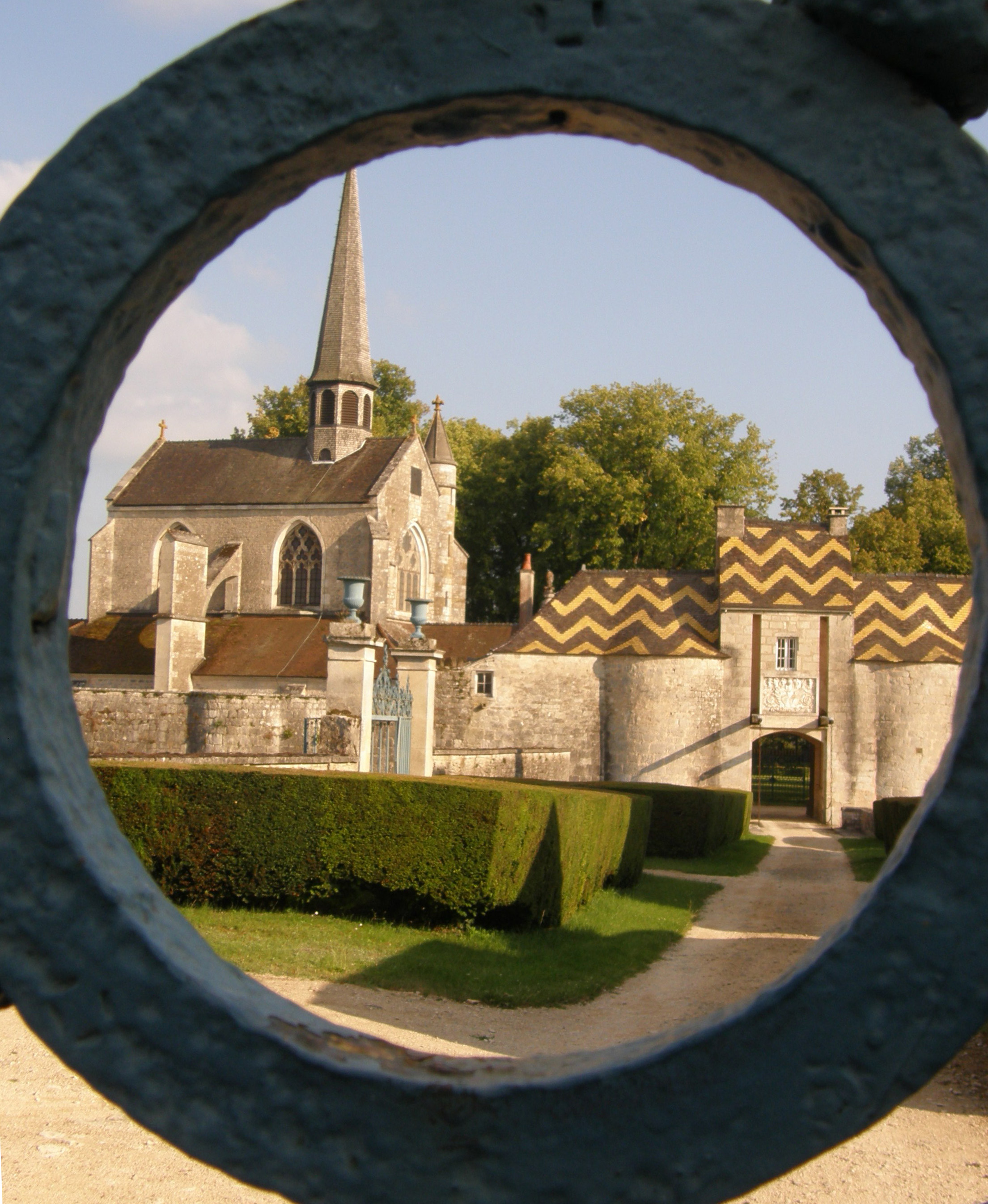
Grancey-le-Chateau

Jacques Eléonor Rouxel de Grancey, Count of Médavy (31 May 1655 – 6 November 1725) was a French military officer and Marshal of France who fought in the Nine Years' War and the War of the Spanish Succession.

== Early life ==
Jacques Eléonor Rouxel de Grancey, born on 31 May 1655 at Chalancey, was the son of Pierre Rouxel (1626-1704), Count of Grancey and of Médavy, and Henriette de La Palud. His paternal grandfather was Marshal Jacques Rouxel de Grancey.

== Career ==
In 1673, at the age of 18 Médavy was enrolled in the prestigious Garde du Corps; he took part in numerous actions during the Nine Years' War and War of the Spanish Succession. He was promoted Lieutenant-General in 1702 and made Marshal of France in 1724, just before his death.

He was made a brigadier in 1688 and a Maréchal de camp in 1692. He served in this capacity at the Battle of Marsaglia, where he was severely wounded.

During the War of the Spanish Succession, he served mainly in Italy under the duc de Vendôme, taking part in most of the battles in that theatre. When Vendôme returned to France in July 1706, Médavy was left in command of Lombardy and defeated a Hessian corps at Castiglione in September.

When French forces were withdrawn from Italy under the Convention of Milan in March 1707, Médavy was given command of French forces in the occupied County of Savoy and took part in the successful defence of Toulon.

In 1704, he was appointed Governor General of Argentan, a position previously held by his father; as a reward for his service in Italy, in 1707 he was also made Governor General for Nivernais and Donziois and in 1714, Governor of the Dauphiné and Provence. In 1720 he became Governor of the Principality of Sedan.

== Personal life ==
In June 1685, he married Marie-Thérèse Colbert, a niece of Jean-Baptiste Colbert.Together, they had three daughters, all of whom died before their father. He also had an illegitimate son Claude Rouxel de Blanchelande, who served in the French military, and who would be the father of Philibert François Rouxel de Blanchelande, who captured Tobago in 1781.

Between 1705 and 1725, he built the Château de Grancey-le-Château-Neuvelle on the site of an existing medieval fortress, which is still used.
