= Siege of Turin =

1706 battle of the War of the Spanish Succession

Coordinates: 45°04′16″N 7°40′27″E

- Part of the War of the Spanish Succession
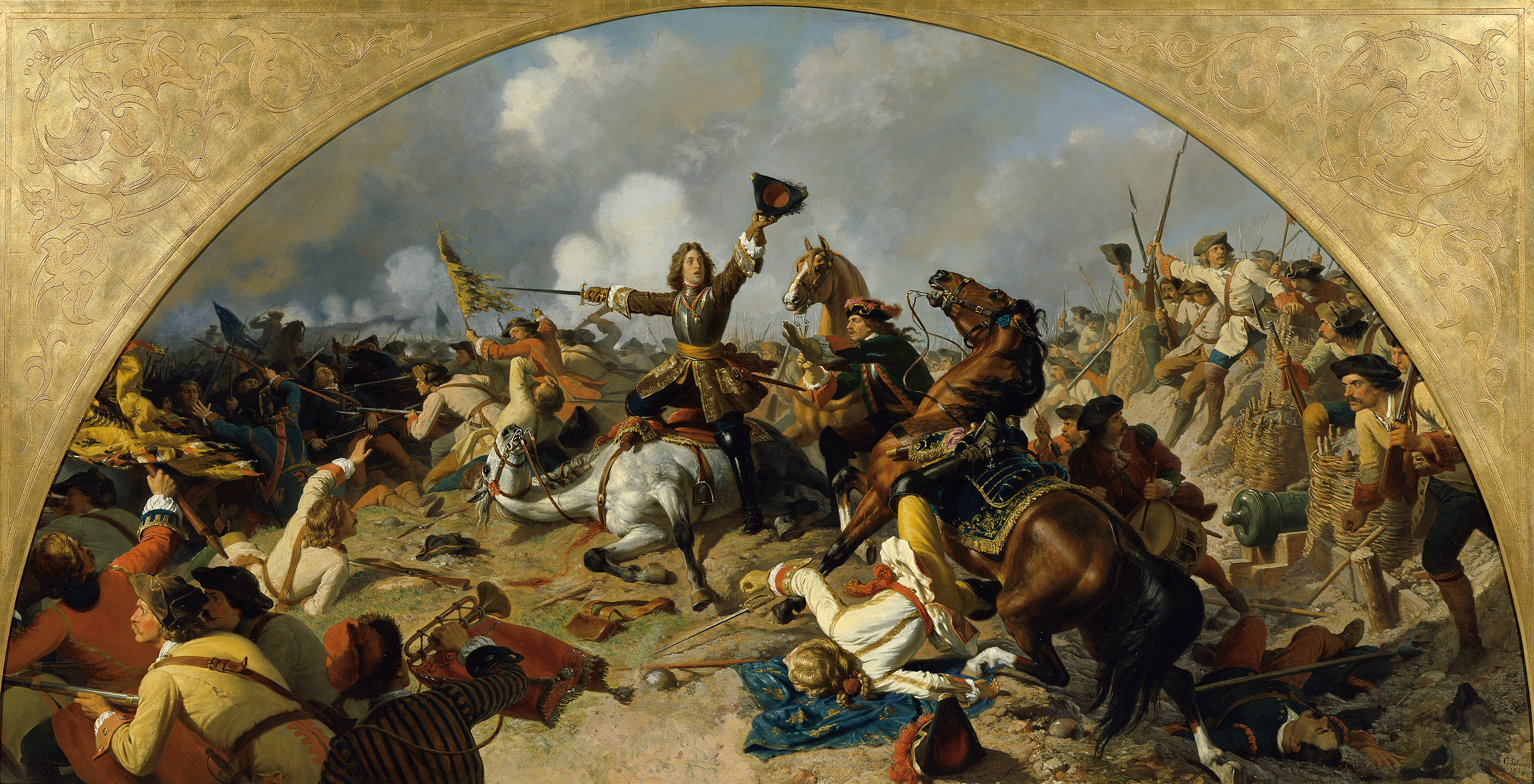
- The Battle of Turin 1706; Karl von Blaas, 1864
Date	2 June – 7 September 1706
Location	Turin, Duchy of Savoy
Result	Grand Alliance victory

Belligerents
Savoy (Austrian Empire) Habsburg Monarchy; Prussia; Holy Roman Empire	France; Spain

Commanders and leaders
(Holy Roman Empire) (Austrian Empire) Prince Eugene (Holy Roman Empire) (Austrian Empire) Philipp von Daun (Duchy of Savoy) Victor Amadeus (Kingdom of Prussia) Prince Leopold (Holy Roman Empire) Johann of Saxe-Gotha (Holy Roman Empire) Charles Alexander, Duke of Wüttemberg	(Kingdom of France) Philippe II, Duke of Orleans (Kingdom of France) Louis de la Feuillade (Kingdom of France) Ferdinand de Marsin †

Strength
36,000 total	60,000 total

Casualties and losses
Siege: 4,600 total (including disease); Relief operation: 3,500–4,800 killed and wounded	Siege: 10,000 total (including disease); Relief operation: 7,000–9,000

The Siege of Turin, June to September 1706, took place during the War of the Spanish Succession. A French army led by Louis de la Feuillade besieged the Savoyard capital of Turin, whose relief by Prince Eugene of Savoy has been called the most brilliant campaign of the war in Italy. The siege is also famous for the death of Piedmontese hero Pietro Micca.

By 1706, France occupied most of the Duchy of Savoy, with the exception of its capital Turin. On 19 April, Louis Joseph, Duke of Vendôme, consolidated the French position in Lombardy by victory at Calcinato. Shortly afterwards, Prince Eugene resumed command of Imperial troops in Northern Italy, while Vendôme was recalled to France in July, and replaced by the Duke of Orleans.

Siege operations began on 2 June but made little progress, while Prince Eugene out manoeuvred the French field army under Orleans, and joined forces with 7,000 cavalry led by Victor Amadeus II of Sardinia. Despite being outnumbered overall, the Allies were able to concentrate their forces; on 7 September, they attacked the French south of Turin, and after fierce fighting, broke through their lines.

The French were forced to withdraw from Northern Italy, allowing Victor Amadeus to recover most of Piedmont, although his possessions north of the Alps were held by France until 1713. In March 1707, France, Savoy and Emperor Joseph signed the Convention of Milan, ending the war in Italy.

== Background ==
The War of the Spanish Succession was triggered by the death in November 1700 of the childless Charles II of Spain. He named his heir as Philip of Anjou, grandson of Louis XIV of France, and on 16 November, he became king of the Spanish Empire. In addition to mainland Spain, this included the Spanish Netherlands, large parts of Italy, and much of Central and South America. In 1701, disputes over territorial and commercial rights led to war between France, Spain, and the Grand Alliance, whose candidate was Charles, younger son of Leopold I, Holy Roman Emperor.

The 1706 campaign in Piedmont; key locations

Fighting in Northern Italy centred on the Spanish-held Duchies of Milan and Mantua, which were considered essential to the security of Austria's southern borders. In March 1701, French troops occupied both cities; Victor Amadeus II, Duke of Savoy, allied with France, in return for which his daughter Maria Luisa married Philip V.

In October 1703, Victor Amadeus switched sides to join the Grand Alliance. The following year, French armies under de la Feuillade captured Savoyard territories north of the Alps in Villefranche and the County of Savoy. Vendôme conducted a simultaneous offensive in Piedmont, and by the end of 1705 Turin was the only significant city still under Savoyard control.

To prevent interference from Imperial forces in Lombardy, Vendôme took the offensive and his victory at Calcinato on 19 April drove them into the Trentino valley. The Austrian commander Prince Eugene returned from Vienna and quickly restored order; this left 30,000 Imperial troops around Verona facing 40,000 French spread between the Mincio and Adige rivers. On 12 May, 48,000 men under de la Feuillade arrived outside Turin, although they did not completely encircle it until 19 June.

However, after a serious defeat at Ramillies in Flanders on 23 May, Louis XIV ordered Vendôme back to France and on 8 July he relinquished command in Italy to the inexperienced Philippe II, Duke of Orléans, although it has been argued he was fortunate to be recalled before Prince Eugene exposed his poor strategic planning for the theatre. Orléans was given Ferdinand de Marsin as his main advisor and while neither was a match for the prince, Vendôme was confident they could prevent him intervening at Turin.

== Siege ==
1858 painting of Pietro Micca by Andrea Gastaldi; by the 19th century, he became a symbol of Italian patriotism

Turin's defences were divided into the outer city, containing the residential and commercial areas, with a fortified Citadel at its core; normal practice was to take the city first, allowing the besiegers to bombard the citadel from close range. Hoping to speed up operations, La Feuillade decided to begin firing on the citadel as soon as possible, from gun positions constructed 300 metres outside the city.

Since 1696, the citadel had been significantly improved based on designs provided by the French military engineer Vauban, and much of it was now underground, including 15 kilometres (9.3 mi) of tunnels used for counter sapping operations. Vauban pointed out firing from that distance meant they could only target the higher part of the walls, not the base, and allegedly offered to have his throat cut if Turin was captured using this approach.

Leaving the Austrian general Philipp von Daun in command of the garrison, Victor Amadeus escaped from the city on 17 June with 7,000 cavalry. Attempting to buy time for Prince Eugene, he spent the next two months attacking French supply lines, while La Feuillade continued siege operations 'with more obstinacy than success.' As Vauban predicted, the bombardment inflicted considerable damage, but the citadel remained largely intact, and French mining attempts proved unsuccessful.

On 15 August, Prince Eugene began his advance on Turin, easily evading Orléans' covering force; on 29th, he reached Carmagnola south of Turin, where he was joined by Victor Amadeus. Often overlooked, this was a considerable achievement, comparable in skill and execution to Marlborough's march to the Danube. Taking over a battered and defeated army, Prince Eugene first reorganised it, then ...marched 200 miles in 24 days...crossed four major rivers, pierced lines drawn between the mountains to the seas to stop him...and drove superior numbers of the enemy before him.

Aware of his approach, Orléans joined La Feuillade, and their combined force made three assaults between 27 August and 3 September. All were repulsed with heavy loss; Pietro Micca was killed on 31 August, after exploding a mine to prevent the French breaking into one of the tunnels underneath the citadel. Including deaths from disease, the leading cause during a prolonged siege, the French suffered losses of 10,000, the garrison 4,500.

== Battle ==
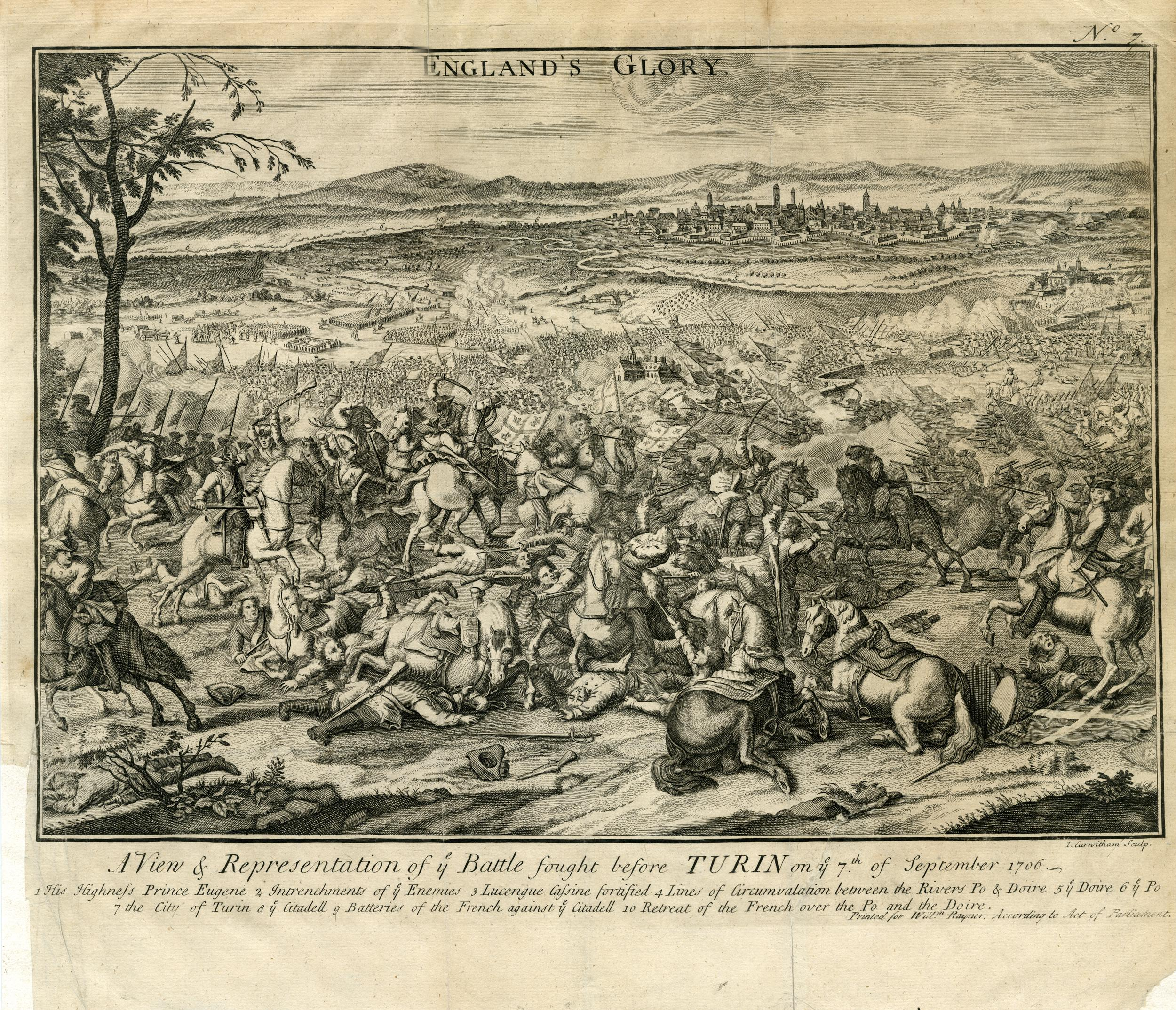
c. 1738 engraving of the battle

Despite their losses, French forces around Turin still outnumbered the combined Imperial-Savoyard relief force of 30,000, but they were dispersed along 25 kilometres (16 mi) of defences, and morale was low after the failed and costly assaults. On 5 September, the Savoyard-Imperial army concentrated at Collegno, between the Dora Riparia and the Stura di Lanzo rivers near a weak spot in the French lines.

On 7 September, Prince Eugene divided his force into eight columns, each split into two lines, leaving gaps between each one for their artillery. Johann of Saxe-Gotha (1677-1707) commanded the right, Charles of Württemberg the left, and Leopold of Anhalt-Dessau the centre. The battle began with an artillery exchange, but the Imperial guns made little impact on the French entrenchments, and around 11:00 am, Prince Eugene ordered a general assault. Although Charles of Württemberg broke through on the left, the rest of the army was held up, before repeated attacks by Leopold, supported by a sortie led by von Daun, finally forced the French to retreat.

Orléans was wounded, as was Marsin, who was captured and died the next day; French casualties ranged from 7,000 to 9,000 (including between 3,200 and 6,000 prisoners), those of the Allies ranged from 3,500 to 4,800. The French withdrew from Turin, abandoning their siege artillery, and retreated towards Pinerolo; Victor Amadeus re-entered his capital the same day.

== Aftermath ==
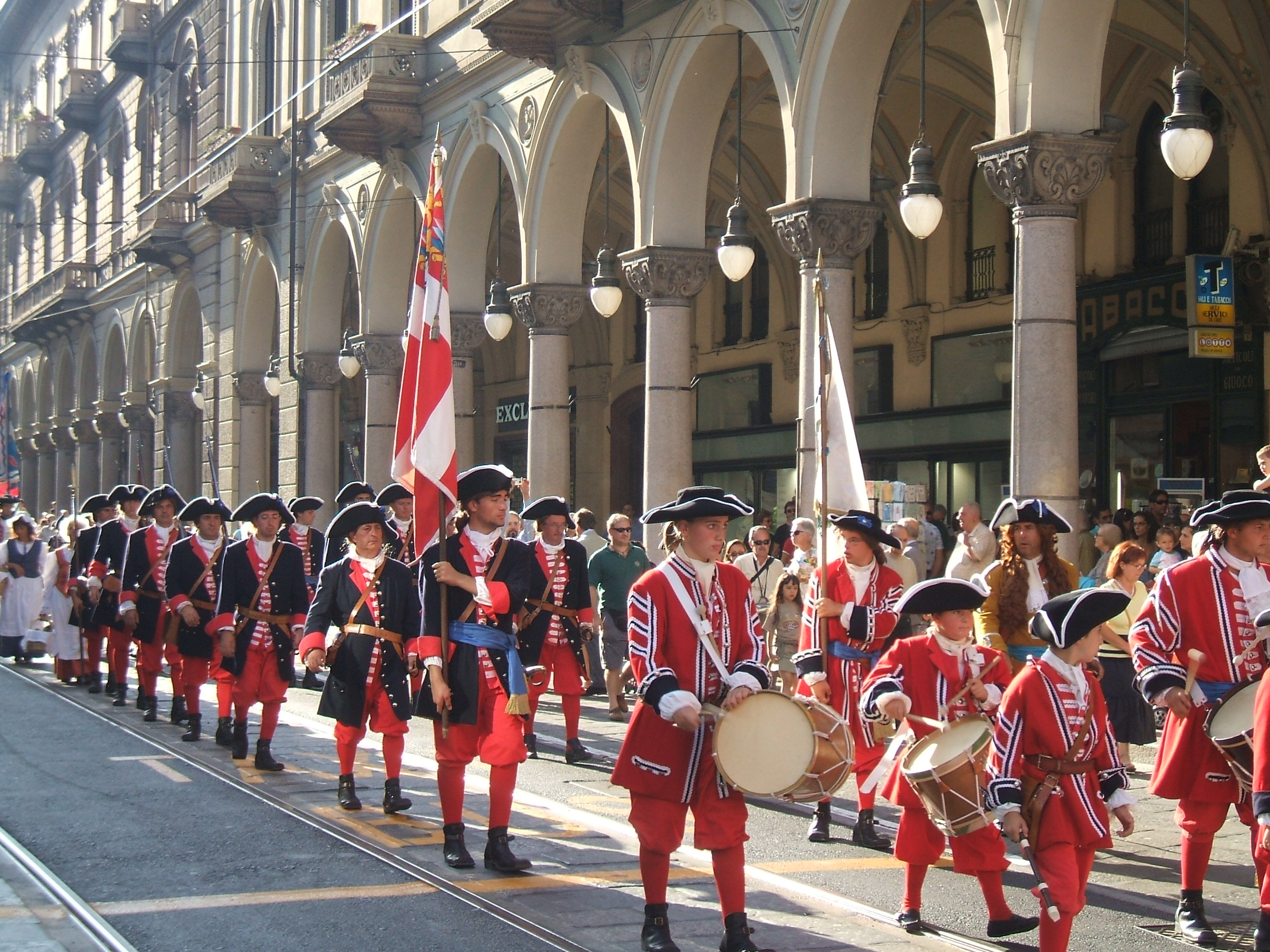
Annual parade in Turin commemorating the siege

On 8 September, a French detachment in Lombardy under the Count of Médavy defeated a Hessian corps at Castiglione but this did not affect the strategic position. French garrisons in Pinerolo and Susa were withdrawn, and the forts reoccupied by Savoy. In 1708, Victor Amadeus gained the minor Duchy of Montferrat, but Nice and the County of Savoy were not returned by France until 1713. Savoyard ambitions to gain Milan remained unfulfilled for another 150 years.

To the fury of his Allies, in March 1707 Emperor Joseph signed the Convention of Milan with France, ending the war in Northern Italy. In return for handing over Milan and Mantua to Austria, French and Spanish troops were repatriated with all their equipment; many were sent to Southern France, where they helped defeat an Allied attack on the French naval base at Toulon in July. In April, Joseph captured the Spanish-ruled Kingdom of Naples, leaving Austria the dominant power in Italy for the first time in two centuries.

After Italian unification in the 19th century, Pietro Micca became an example of patriotism and loyalty to the new Italian state. He was the hero of the 1938 film Pietro Micca; on the tercentenary of his death in 2006, a number of studies were published to mark the occasion, including Le Aquile e i Gigli; Una storia mai scritta, by Cerino Badone.

In 2004, construction of an underground carpark in the Piazza Vittorio Veneto uncovered 22 skeletons dating from the early 18th century; a study published in 2019 indicates these are almost certainly casualties from the 1706 siege.

== Sources ==
- Badone, Cerino G (2007). 1706 Le aquile & i gigli. Una storia mai scritta (in Italian). Omega. ISBN 978-8872415122.
- Clodfelter, Micheal (2002). Warfare and Armed Conflicts: A Statistical Reference to Casualty and Other Figures 1500–1999. McFarland & Co. ISBN 978-0786412044.
- Dhondt, Frederik (2015). De Ruysscher, D; Capelle, K (eds.). History in Legal Doctrine; Vattel and Réal De Curban on the Spanish Succession; the War of the Spanish Succession in Legal history; moving in new directions. Maklu. ISBN 978-9046607589.
- Duffy, Christopher (1995). Siege Warfare: The Fortress in the Early Modern World 1494–1660. Routledge. ISBN 978-0415146494.
- El Hage, Fadi (2017). Drévillon, Hervé; Fonck, Bertrand (eds.). Le duc de Vendôme en Italie (1702–1706) in Les dernières guerres de Louis XIV; 1688–1715 (in French). Presses universitaires de Rennes. ISBN 978-2753585317.
- Falkner, James (2015). The War of the Spanish Succession 1701–1714 (Kindle ed.). Pen and Sword. ISBN 978-1473872905.
- Lynn, John (1999). The Wars of Louis XIV 1667–1714. Longman. ISBN 0582056292.
- Mercinelli, Martina; Smith, Martin J (2019). "Fallen Comrades? Anthropological analysis of human remains from the siege of Turin, 1706". Human Remains and Violence. 5 (2): 1–18. doi:10.7227/HRV.5.2.4.
- Norris, David A (2015). "Italy is Ours; the 1706 Campaign". Warfare History Network.
- Somerset, Anne (2012). Queen Anne; the Politics of Passion. Harper. ISBN 978-0007203765.
- Somerville, Thomas (1795). The History of Great Britain During the Reign of Queen Anne (2018 ed.). Forgotten Books. ISBN 1333572379.
- Sundstrom, Roy A (1992). Sidney Godolphin: Servant of the State. EDS Publications Ltd. ISBN 0874134382.
- Symcox, Geoffrey (1983). Victor Amadeus II: Absolutism in the Savoyard State, 1675–1730. Thames and Hudson. ISBN 978-0500870105.
- Tucker, Spencer C (2009). A Global Chronology of Conflict: From the Ancient World to the Modern Middle East 6V: A Global Chronology of Conflict [6 volumes]. ABC-CLIO. ISBN 978-1851096671.
- Bodart, Gaston (1908). Militär-historisches Kriegs-Lexikon (1618–1905).
