= Battle of Castiglione (1706) =

Battle of 1706 during the War of Spanish Succession

First Battle of Castiglione
- Part of the War of the Spanish Succession
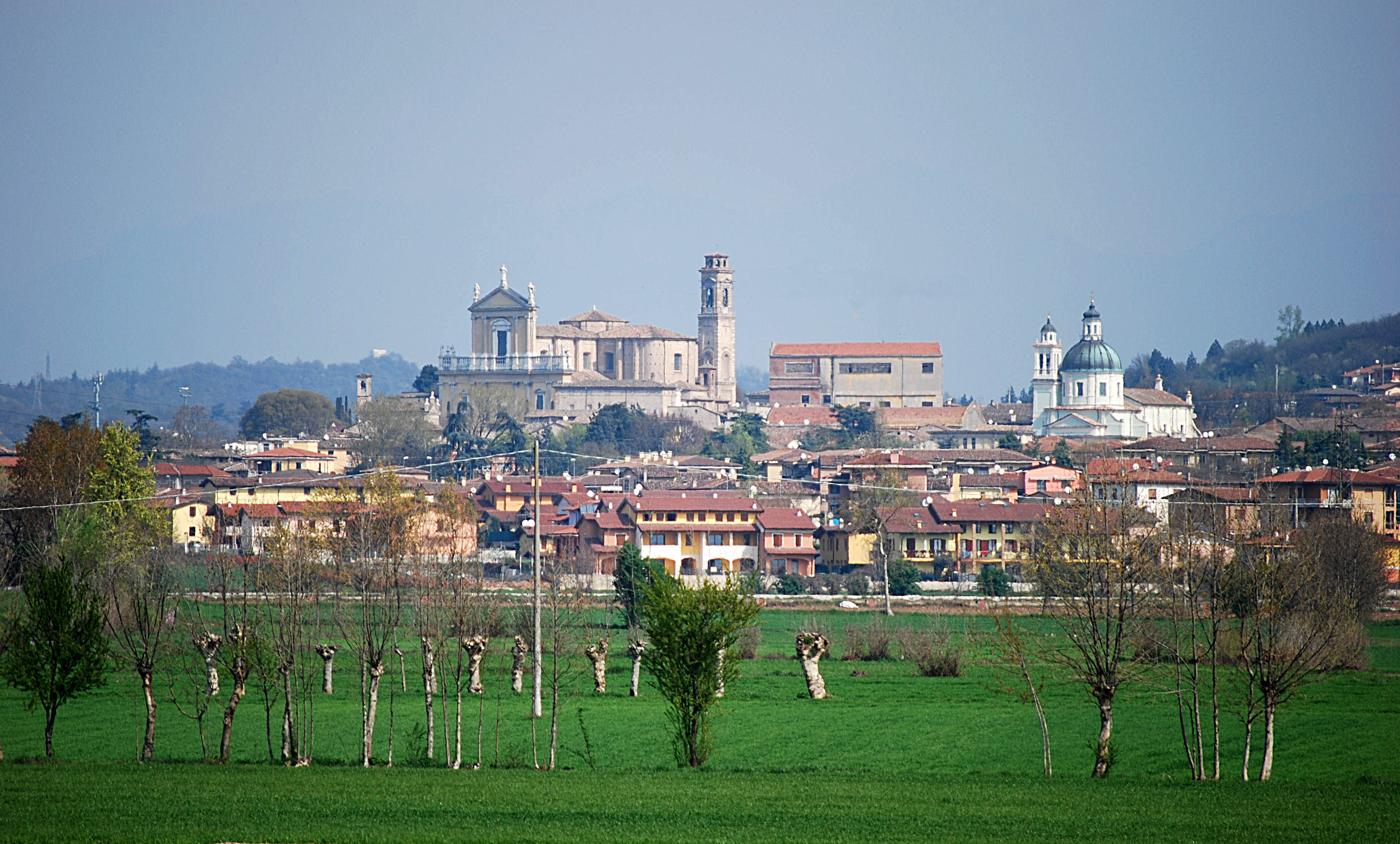
- View of Castiglione delle Stiviere
Date	9 September 1706
Location	Castiglione delle Stiviere
Result	French victory

Belligerents
France	Hesse-Kassel

Commanders and leaders
Count of Médavy	Frederick of Hesse-Kassel

Strength
12,000	8,000 – 10,000

Casualties and losses
1,000 killed or wounded	1,500 killed or wounded 2,500 captured

The Battle of Castiglione took place near Castiglione delle Stiviere in Lombardy, Italy on 9 September 1706 during the War of the Spanish Succession. A French army of 12,000 attacked a Hessian corps of 10,000 that was besieging the town and forced them to retreat with heavy losses.

However, the battle did not affect the overall strategic position since Imperial victories elsewhere meant that by the end of 1706, French troops in Lombardy were isolated and their surrender only a matter of time. This led to the Convention of Milan in March 1707, which allowed them free passage to France in return for withdrawing from their remaining garrisons and effectively ended the war in Northern Italy.

== Background ==
Northern Italy, Lombardy (in yellow); key locations, 1706 Castiglione campaign.

By the end of 1705, France and its allies controlled most of Northern Italy, as well as the Savoyard territories of Villefranche and the County of Savoy, now in modern-day France. The Imperial army in Italy was substantially reinforced, with England and the Dutch Republic financing an army of 20,000 German auxiliaries, which included an additional 10,000 troops from Hesse-Kassel as well as renewing an existing agreement with Prussia.

The main French objective for 1706 was to capture the Savoyard capital of Turin; to prevent Imperial forces in Lombardy intervening, Vendôme attacked at Calcinato on 19 April and drove them into the Trentino valley. On 12 May, his deputy de La Feuillade reached Turin with an army of 48,000 men and completed their blockade of the city on 19 June. The Imperial commander Prince Eugene returned from Vienna and took the remaining troops into the Province of Verona to await the German contingents. By early July, there were 30,000 Imperial soldiers around Verona facing 40,000 French spread between the Mincio and Adige rivers.

The French position looked very strong but defeat at Ramillies in May meant Vendôme and any available troops were sent to Northern France. The Siege of Turin continued and although the Hessians had not yet arrived, by mid-July Prince Eugene could no longer delay marching to its relief. The new French commander in Italy, Louis XIV's nephew Philippe II, Duke of Orléans followed him, leaving Médavy and 23,000 men to guard the Alpine passes.

== Battle ==
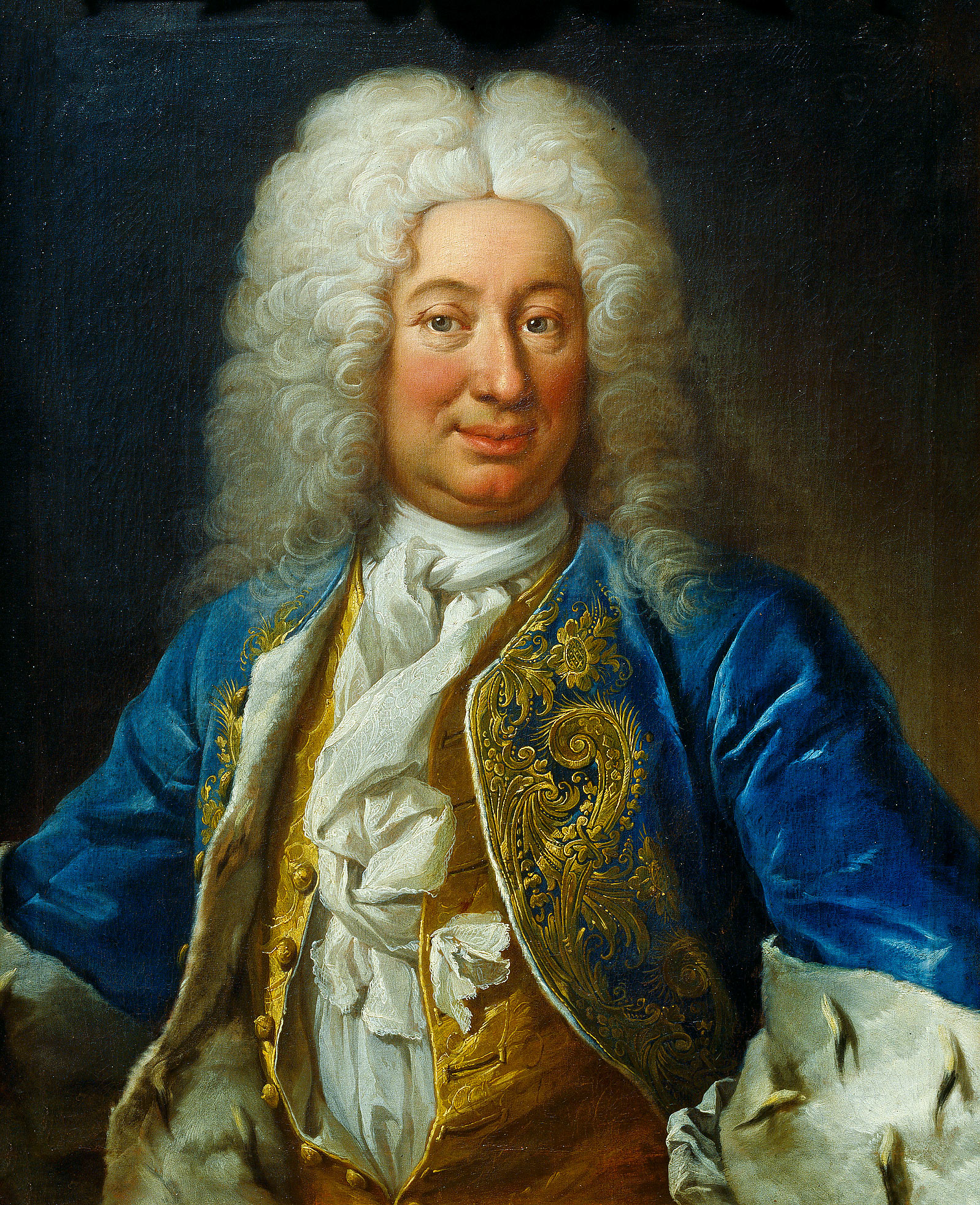
Frederick of Hesse-Kassel, Allied commander at Castiglione

The Hessians finally crossed the Alps in July, under the command of Frederick of Hesse-Kassel, who later succeeded the far more talented Charles XII as King of Sweden. Arriving too late to join the march on Turin, his men were tasked with preventing Médavy from disrupting his supply routes. On 19 August, Frederick sent 2,000 men under Major-General Wetzel to Goito, a small town with a bridge across the Mincio and the French garrison evacuated the town. Castiglione was strongly defended and they had to wait for the heavy artillery to arrive from Arco. Frederick left 1,500 men outside the town with the rest positioned near Medole, allowing him to monitor Médavy's main force at Cremona and the crossing at Goito.

The withdrawal from Goito was part of Médavy's plan to assemble a field army without alerting Frederick by removing garrisons from strongpoints like Cremona. This allowed him to put together a force of 8,000 infantry and 4,000 cavalry, which crossed the Oglio river at Marcaria and attacked the Hessians in the afternoon of 8 September. Dividing his corps left Frederick outnumbered; the first assaults were repulsed but a cavalry charge led by the Irish exile Arthur Dillon caught the Hessian left as they were changing position and the line collapsed. Médavy then attacked those outside Castiglione, many of whom surrendered; French casualties were estimated as 1,000 killed or wounded, the Hessians losing around 1,500 killed or wounded plus 2,500 captured.

The remainder fell back on Valeggio; in a letter written to the Duke of Marlborough and dated 11 September, Frederick claimed his forces were weakened by sickness but although they initially drove the French back, lack of artillery forced him to retreat. Marlborough's response dated 29 September is a masterpiece of flattery.

== Aftermath ==
Despite his success, Médavy's victory left the strategic position unaltered; on 7 September, Prince Eugene had broken the siege of Turin and followed up by capturing Milan. This left French forces in Lombardy isolated while France could no longer spare the resources to continue fighting in Italy. Castiglione slightly improved their bargaining position but the capture of Milan by Prince Eugene prevented French garrisons in Lombardy being reinforced and meant their surrender being only a matter of time.

To the fury of the English and Dutch who had financed the Imperial campaign, as well as Victor Amadeus who had expected to gain Milan, in March 1707 Emperor Joseph signed the Convention of Milan. This allowed French troops in Italy free passage back to France while he gained the Duchy of Milan, considered vital to the security of Austria's southern borders, and was spared the expense of reducing the French garrisons one by one. It also meant the collapse of Spanish power throughout Italy and allowed Austria to take over their possessions.

To placate his allies, Joseph agreed to support an Anglo-Savoyard attack on the French naval base at Toulon. Its capture would confirm Allied naval supremacy in the western Mediterranean Sea, support the Protestant Camisard revolt in Southern France, divert Bourbon forces from Spain, and win back the French-occupied Savoyard territories of Villefranche and the County of Savoy. At the last minute Joseph ordered Count Wirich Philipp von Daun to take 8,000 troops allocated for this campaign and capture the Spanish-ruled Kingdom of Naples. This was complete by the end of September although lack of a navy prevented the Austrians from taking the Kingdom of Sicily and ended fighting in Italy.

== Sources ==
- Bancks, John (1745). The history of Francis-Eugene Prince of Savoy (2010 ed.). Gale ECCO. ISBN 1170621236.
- Blackley, William (1845). The Diplomatic Correspondence of the Right Hon. Richard Hill ...: Envoy Extraordinary from the Court of St. James to the Duke of Savoy ... from July 1703, to May 1706 (2010 ed.). Nabu Press. ISBN 1145943462.
- Churchill, John, Duke of Marlborough (1845). The Letters and Dispatches of John Churchill, First Duke of Marlborough, From 1702-1712; Volume 3 (2018 ed.). Sagwan Press. ISBN 1376535238.
- Frey, Linda; Frey, Marsha, eds. (1995). The Treaties of the War of the Spanish Succession: An Historical and Critical Dictionary. Greenwood. ISBN 978-0313278846.
- Ingrao, Charles W (2010). The Habsburg Monarchy, 1618-1815. Cambridge University Press. ISBN 978-0521785051.
- Lynn, John (1999). The Wars of Louis XIV 1667-1714. Longman. ISBN 0582056292.
- Quincy, Charles Sevin (1726). Histoire Militaire Du Règne De Louis-le-grand, Roi De France (in French) (2010 ed.). Nabu Press. ISBN 1173835547.
- Symcox, Geoffrey (1983). Victor Amadeus II: Absolutism in the Savoyard State, 1675-1730. University of California Press. ISBN 0520049748.
- Wilson, Peter (1998). German Armies: War and German Society, 1648-1806. Routledge. ISBN 1857281063.
- Michele Favro, L'Espero dei Gonzaga. Il principato di Castiglione delle Stiviere e di Solferino verso la catastrofe (1701-1708), ed. Torre d'Ercole, Brescia, 2024. ISBN 978-88-96755-42-6
