= Princess Anne Charlotte of Lorraine =

Abbess of Remiremont and Mons (1714–1773)

Anne Charlotte de Lorraine
- Abbess of Remiremont and Mons; Coadjutor Abbess of Thorn and Essen
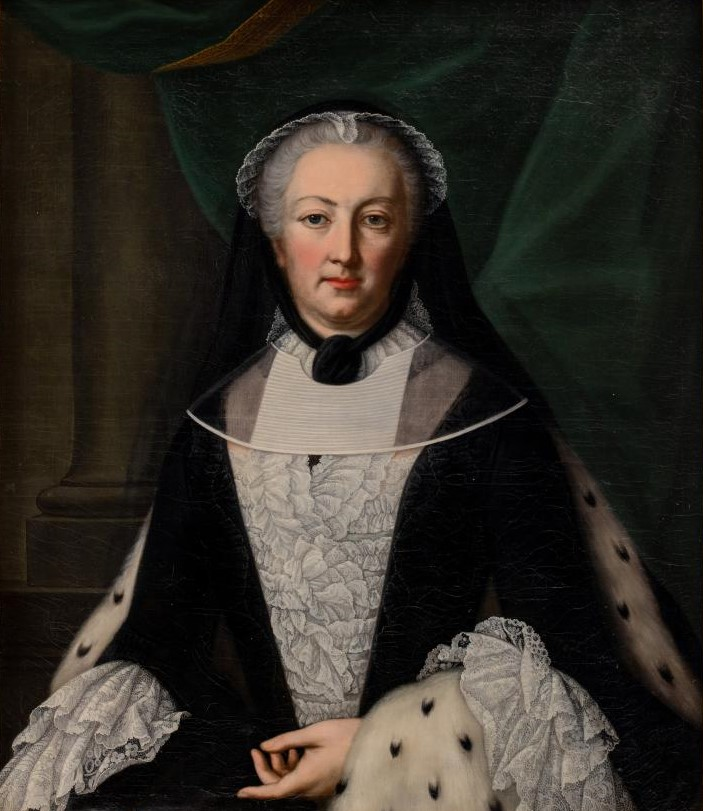
- Born: 17 May 1714; Château de Lunéville, Duchy of Lorraine
- Died: 7 November 1773 (aged 59); Mons, Austrian Netherlands
- Burial: Church of Saint-François-des-Cordeliers, Nancy, France
- House: House of Lorraine
- Father: Leopold, Duke of Lorraine
- Mother: Élisabeth Charlotte d'Orléans
- Religion: Roman Catholic

Anne Charlotte of Lorraine (17 May 1714 – 7 November 1773) was the Abbess of Remiremont and Mons. She was the thirteenth of fourteen children of Leopold, Duke of Lorraine, and his spouse Élisabeth Charlotte d'Orléans. Her mother was the niece of Louis XIV of France and sister of Philippe II, Duke of Orléans and Regent of France during the minority of Louis XV.

== Family ==
Anne Charlotte was born at the Château de Lunéville because the Capital of Lorraine, Nancy, was occupied by French troops of Louis XIV due to the War of the Spanish Succession. She was given her mother's name of Charlotte. At the time of her birth, she had three brothers and a sister alive: Léopold Clément, born in 1707 and heir of the Duchy as the eldest surviving son; Francis Stephen born in 1708; Élisabeth Thérèse born in 1711; and then Charles-Alexandre born in 1712. In 1718, her mother had a stillborn daughter in her last recorded pregnancy.

In 1719 the Château de Lunéville where Anne Charlotte was born was damaged greatly by a fire.

Anne Charlotte was seven and a half when she went to the French court of her maternal family, the Royal House of Bourbon. She met her grandmother, the Dowager Duchess of Orléans, the Princess Palatine for the first and last time; the occasion was for the coronation of Louis XV at the Cathedral of Notre-Dame in Rheims. Her grandmother said that Anne Charlotte was a "little beauty" and that she and her siblings had been brought up well; her mother would always be praised for her maternal instinct. Uncommon for the time, Anne Charlotte's mother insisted that she raise her children, and had a close and affectionate relationship with them.

== Marriage negotiations with the King of France ==
In 1723 Anne Charlotte's father, Léopold, disappointed with his relations with France, decided to send his heir to finish his education in Vienna under the supervision of Charles VI, Holy Roman Emperor. Léopold had been secretly hoping to have his son marry the Emperor's heiress, Archduchess Maria Theresa. The young prince of 16 years died the same year and as a result his brother Francis Stephen became the heir to Lorraine and left Lunéville for Vienna. Francis Stephen later married Maria Theresa and became Holy Roman Emperor upon her accession, the couple having sixteen children. Anne Charlotte's younger sister Marie Louise also died on the same day.

Two years later, the Ducal couple hoped and tried fiercely to get Anne Charlotte to marry the King of France Louis XV who at the time was just 15 years old. The intrigues of the Prime Minister, the Duke of Bourbon, prince of the blood, head of the Condé family and great rival of the House of Orléans also fought fiercely to stop the marriage as it would have decreased their influence over the young king. This did not stop the Duke of Bourbon and his mistress the marquise de Prie, from suggesting the king marry the sister of the Duke, Henriette Louise de Bourbon. Despite the plans of the Prime Minister, Marie Leszczyńska, a poor and plain Catholic princess who was the second daughter of an exiled King Stanislaw I of Poland was chosen as the bride of the monarch. Anne Charlotte's parents were greatly insulted that the daughter of an exiled Pole was to become Queen and not someone who was brought up as French.

== Marriage negotiations with the Duke of Orléans ==
In 1726, the son of the now dead Regent, nephew of the Duchess of Lorraine, became a widower aged 23; his wife Margravine Auguste Marie Johanna of Baden-Baden had died in Paris in childbirth. The Duchess of Lorraine once again tried to get her daughter a husband; it failed; The Duke of Orléans refused all offers of marriage, the last one being made in 1729 when Anne Charlotte was 15.

In the same year Anne Charlotte lost her father Léopold. Her brother, Francis Stephen, still in Vienna returned to Lorraine. While awaiting the return of the latter, Élisabeth Charlotte seized the regency because her son was 17. In 1737, however, the Duchy of Lorraine was annexed by France in exchange for the Duchy of Tuscany in a treaty between France and Francis Stephen.

The Dowager Duchess princess now went with Anne Charlotte to Vienna. The marriage of Francis and Maria Theresa then allowed them to negotiate the marriage of Princess Élisabeth Thérèse to Charles Emmanuel III of Sardinia, his first cousin and already two times widower. The Queen of Sardinia died four years later in childbirth in Turin.

=== Abbess of Remiremont ===
By the marriage of her sister to the King of Sardinia, Anne Charlotte was aged 23. All proposals of marriage being either ignored or declined, Anne Charlotte was made the Abbess of the prestigious Remiremont Abbey on 10 May 1738. Remiremont had previously been the "property" of her older sister Élisabeth Charlotte (who died before Anne Charlotte was born) who was the titular abbess of the prestigious abbey which had many connections with the House of Lorraine.

Her new title caused irritation between certain sovereign princes because this abbey, composed solely of ladies of high nobility and of which the temporal domain included a big number of towns, answered only to authority of the pope.

Later on, Anne Charlotte decided to build a sumptuous abbey palace.

=== Vienna ===
In 1744 the Dowager Duchess of Lorraine, Princess of Commercy died aged 68. After her mother's death, she went to Vienna. She attended the Imperial family in Frankfurt and witnessed the coronation of Francis as Emperor on 4 October 1745, feast day of Saint Francis. The Abbess was given apartments at the vast Schönbrunn Palace.

=== Brussels ===
In 1754 at the age of 30, Anne Charlotte was made the Secular Abbess of the chapter of Noble Ladies of Saint Waltrude of Mons; thus she went to Belgium to see her youngest brother Charles Alexander who had been the Governor of the Austrian Netherlands since 1744. As a Secular Abbess, she could therefore manage this monastery, all the while remaining in the world. Two years later, she was again named by her sister-in-law coadjutor of the monastery of Thorn and in 1757 coadjutor of the one of Essen.

In Brussels, she enjoyed great influence over her brother and served as "first lady." Although Charles Alexander had been a widower for ten years, his wife was the youngest sister of the Empress and she reproached him about his liaison with Madame de Meuse. In 1763, she designated as coadjutor and successor of Remiremont the Princess Kunigunde of Saxony, sister of the Queen of Naples and Sicily and the Dauphine of France. In 1765, she attended the marriage of her nephew the future Léopold II to Infanta Maria Luisa of Spain in Innsbrück; the same year her brother the Emperor died. From April to September 1770, Anne Charlotte made a last trip to Vienna.

On the way, Anne Charlotte crossed the path taken by her niece, the 14-year-old Archduchess Maria Antonia towards that of her French marriage.

Anne Charlotte died in Mons in present-day Belgium at the age of 59. She was buried at the Ducal Crypt in Lorraine, the Église Saint-François-des-Cordelier. She was joined by her brother Charles Alexander in 1780.

== Ancestry ==
Ancestors of Princess Anne Charlotte of Lorraine

8. Nicholas II, Duke of Lorraine
4. Charles V, Duke of Lorraine
9. Claude Françoise of Lorraine
2. Leopold, Duke of Lorraine
10. Ferdinand III, Holy Roman Emperor
5. Eleanor of Austria
11. Eleonora Gonzaga
1. Princess Anne Charlotte of Lorraine
12. Louis XIII of France
6. Philippe I, Duke of Orléans
13. Anne of Austria
3. Élisabeth Charlotte of Orléans
14. Charles I Louis, Elector Palatine
7. Elizabeth Charlotte of the Palatinate
15. Charlotte of Hesse-Kassel
