= Leopold, Duke of Lorraine =

Duke of Lorraine and Bar from 1690 to 1729

Leopold
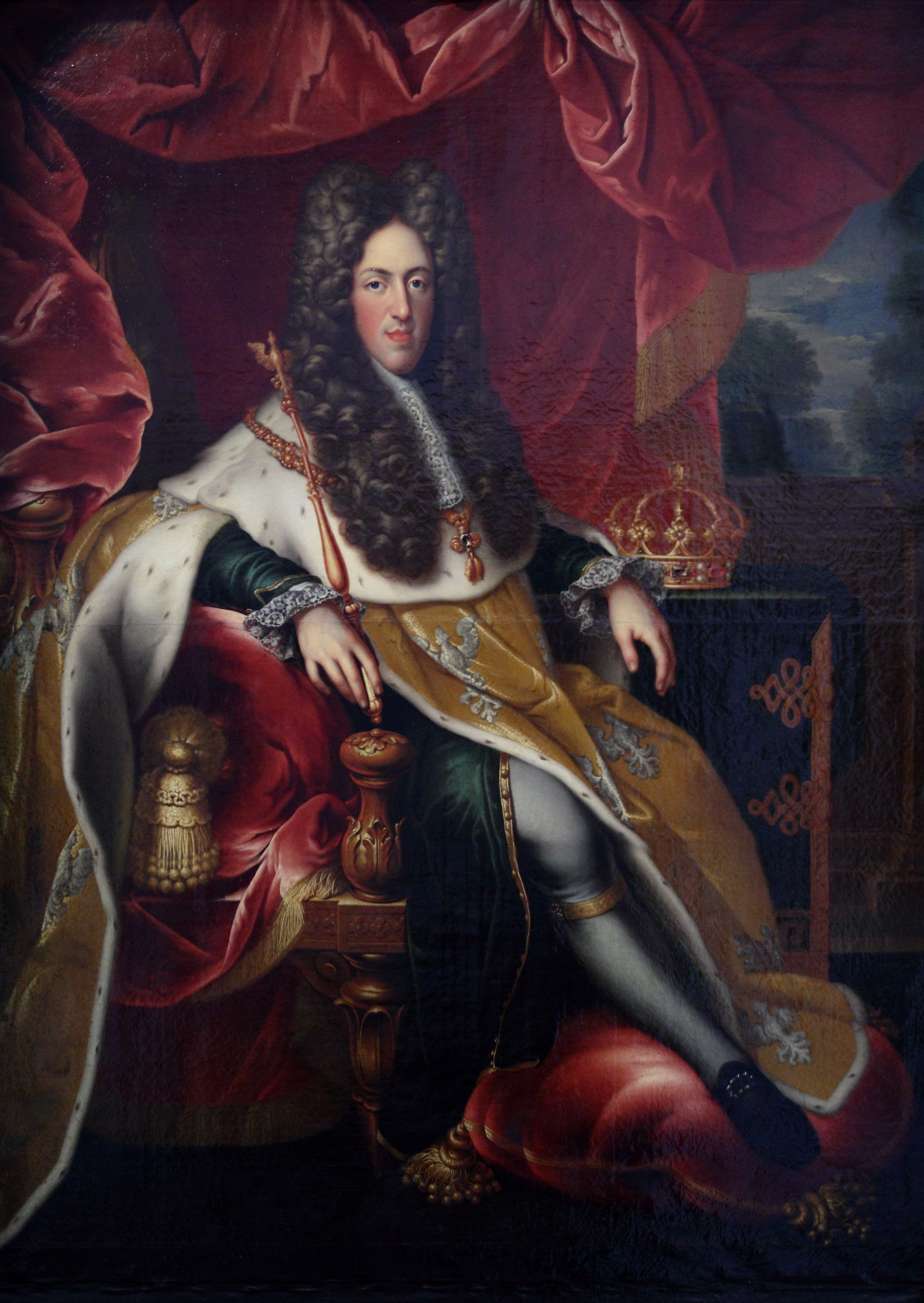
- Portrait by Nicolas-Philippe Dupuy, 1703

Duke of Lorraine and Bar
- Reign: 18 April 1690 – 27 March 1729
- Predecessor: Charles V
- Successor: Francis III Stephen

Duke of Teschen
- Reign: 12 May 1722 – 27 March 1729
- Predecessor: Elizabeth Lucretia
- Successor: Francis Stephen
- Born: 11 September 1679; Palace of Innsbruck, Tyrol, Archduchy of Austria, Holy Roman Empire (now in Austria)
- Died: 27 March 1729 (aged 49); Château de Lunéville, Lorraine, Duchy of Lorraine (now in France)
- Burial: Church of Saint-François-des-Cordeliers, Nancy, France
- Spouse: Élisabeth Charlotte d'Orléans (m. 1698)
- Issue Detail: Princess Élisabeth Charlotte; Louis, Hereditary Prince of Lorraine; Léopold Clément, Hereditary Prince of Lorraine; Francis I, Holy Roman Emperor; Elisabeth Therese, Queen of Sardinia; Charles Alexander, Governor of the Austrian Netherlands; Anne Charlotte, Abbess of Essen
- House: Lorraine
- Father: Charles V, Duke of Lorraine
- Mother: Eleonore of Austria
- Religion: Roman Catholicism
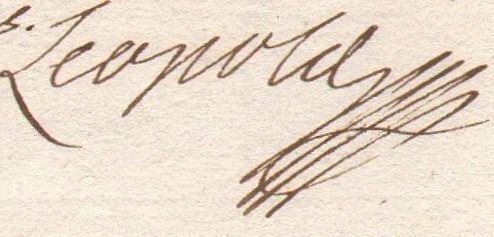
- Signature

Leopold the Good (11 September 1679 – 27 March 1729) was Duke of Lorraine and Bar from 1690 to his death. Through his son Francis Stephen, he is the direct male ancestor of all rulers of the Habsburg-Lorraine dynasty, including all Emperors of Austria.

== Early life ==
Leopold Joseph Charles Dominique Agapet Hyacinthe was the son of Charles V, Duke of Lorraine, and his wife Eleonora Maria Josefa of Austria, a half-sister of Leopold I, Holy Roman Emperor.

At the time of Leopold's birth, Lorraine and Bar had been occupied by Louis XIV of France, forcing his parents to move into exile to Austria, where they lived under the protection of the Emperor. Therefore, Leopold was born in the palace of Innsbruck and received his first name in honour of the Emperor. Leopold grew up in Innsbruck, while his father would be engaged in defending Vienna against the Turks.

In 1690, his father died and eleven-year-old Leopold inherited the still occupied Duchies. His mother, trying to fulfil her husband's last wishes of returning her children to their patrimony, appealed to the Reichstag in Regensburg to restore her son to Lorraine. Leopold was sent to Vienna to receive a military education under the supervision of the Emperor. In Vienna, he grew up with his cousins, the Archdukes Joseph and Charles, both future Emperors. Leopold was also created a Knight of the Order of the Golden Fleece that year.

Like his father before him, he entered the Imperial Army and, aged eighteen, took part in the Siege of Timișoara in 1694. Three years later, he received the command of the Army of the Rhine.

== Duke of Lorraine ==
On 30 October 1697, the Nine Years' War (aka, War of the League of Augsburg) ended with the signing of the Treaty of Ryswick.

The treaty restored the duchies of Lorraine and Bar to the House of Lorraine, as Leopold's mother had hoped; she died four days later in Vienna. On 17 August 1698, Duke Leopold made a triumphant entry into his capital Nancy. He reconstructed and repopulated his war-stricken duchy, encouraging immigration. At the end of his reign the duchy was safe and prosperous.

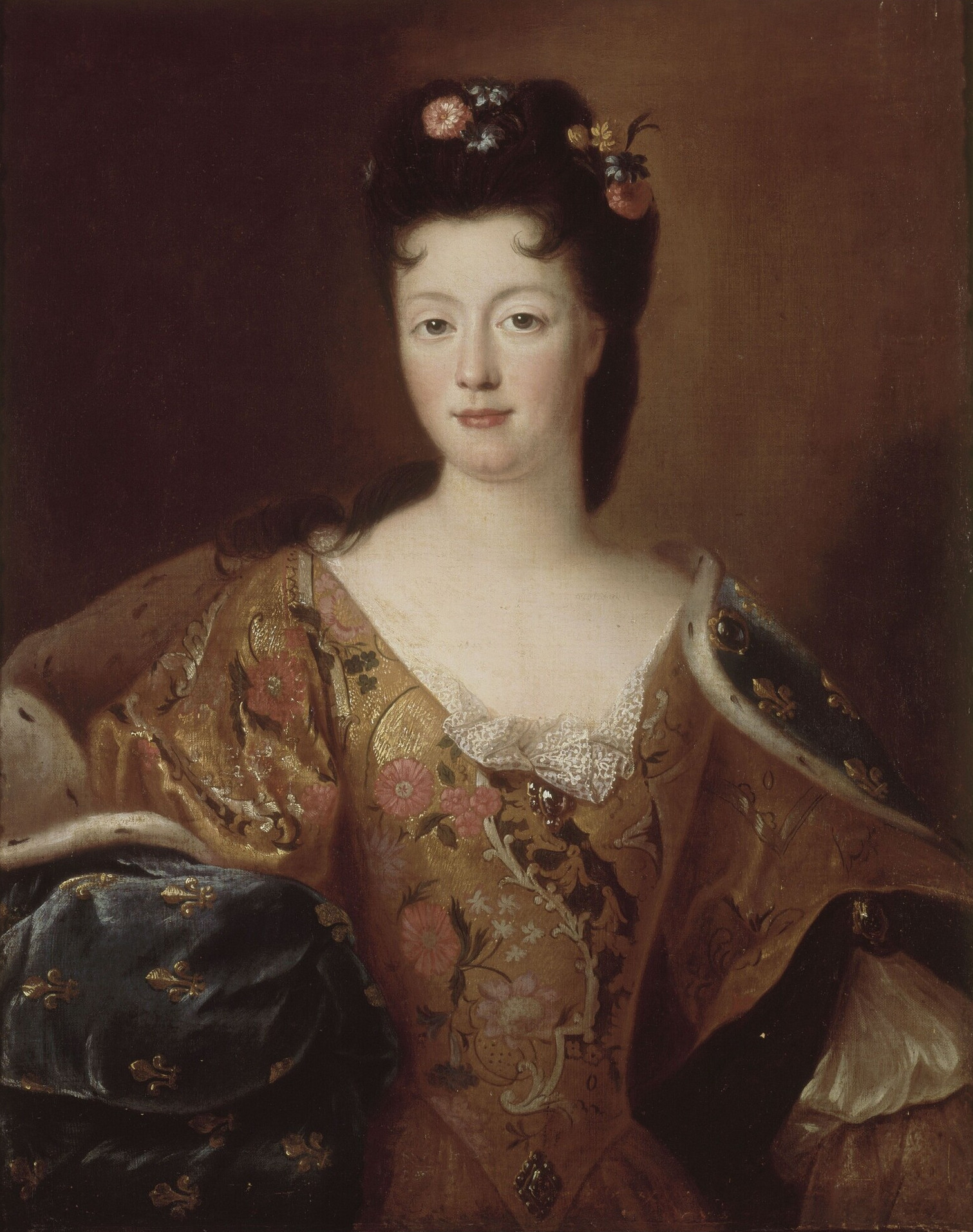
Leopold's wife, Élisabeth Charlotte d'Orléans.

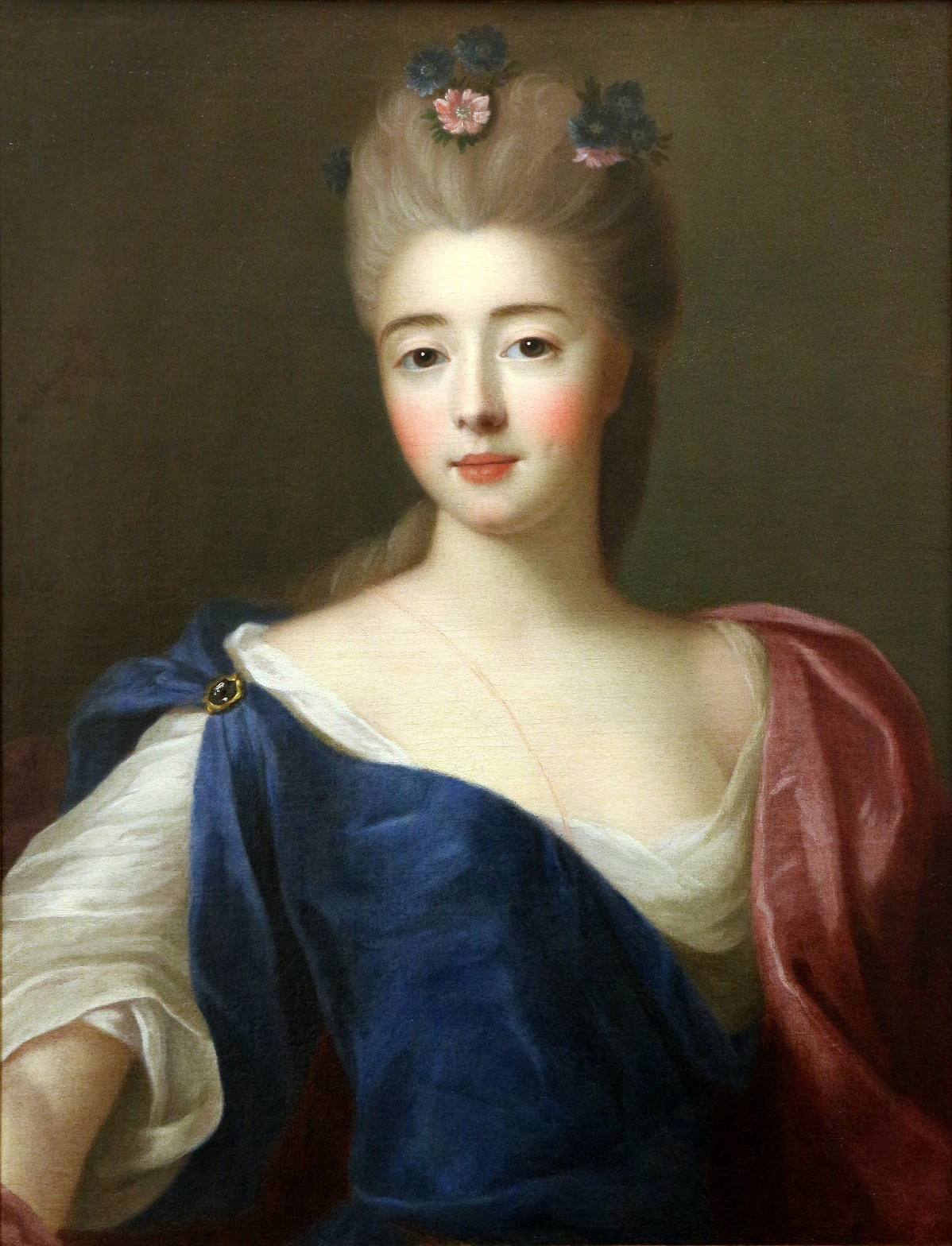
Leopold's mistress, Anne-Marguerite de Lignéville

In his foreign policy, Leopold tried to further good relations with France and to appease his powerful neighbor. On 13 October 1698 at the Palace of Fontainebleau, Leopold married Élisabeth Charlotte d'Orléans, the niece of Louis XIV, who had offered a dowry of 900,000 livres to the penniless Duke. Élisabeth Charlotte turned out to be a caring mother and gave birth to fourteen children, of whom only four survived into mature adulthood. Three of them died within a week in May 1711 due to a smallpox outbreak at the Château de Lunéville, the country seat of the dukes of Lorraine.

Despite Leopold's diplomatic attempts, his capital, Nancy, was occupied by foreign troops during the War of the Spanish Succession (1700–1713). Fearing for his family, Leopold relocated the court to the Château de Lunéville, where Leopold rebuilt the castle as the "Versailles of Lorraine". It was here that his first child Leopold was born in 1700.

In 1703, the Duke introduced the Code Léopold regulating the government of the Duchy. A number of crimes were punishable with death by burning, such as witchcraft, coin forgery, arson, and sexual acts "contrary to nature". Also, those guilty of aggravated theft of sacred objects from a church could be condemned to be burnt alive. He tried to install his eldest daughter, Élisabeth Charlotte Gabrièle of Lorraine, as Abbess of Remiremont but failed due to the opposition of Pope Clement XI.

Leopold's marital life was troubled in 1708, when he took Anne-Marguerite de Lignéville, Princess of Beauvau-Craon as his mistress. Élisabeth Charlotte however, following her mother's advice, remained silent and continued to give her husband children.

In 1708, Leopold had claimed the Duchy of Montferrat as the closest relative of his cousin, Charles III Gonzaga, erstwhile Duke of Mantua, who had been deposed and then died without male issue. However, the Emperor had already promised Montferrat to the Dukes of Savoy but wishing to compensate the House of Lorraine, he gave the Duchy of Teschen in Silesia to Leopold.

In 1710, Leopold and his wife visited Paris to attend the marriage of Élisabeth Charlotte's niece Marie Louise Elisabeth to the Duke of Berry and were among the guests of the lavish banquet at the Palais du Luxembourg. During the visit, Leopold, as a foreign prince, received the style of Royal Highness.

In 1719, Leopold bought the County of Ligny-en-Barrois from his cousin, Charles Henry of Vaudemont. During his reign a new security system was put in place all around Lorraine. He tried to abolish serfdom but the redemption payments were too high for the peasantry, even when Leopold halved it. On New Year's Eve 1719 he freed his own serfs without redemption, hoping in vain the nobility would follow his example.

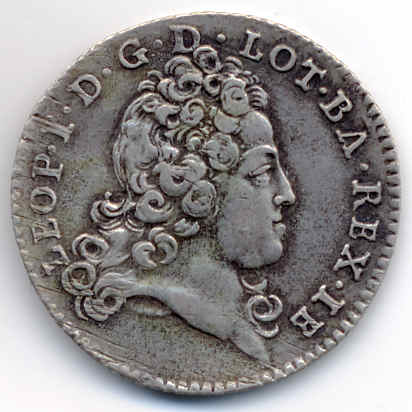
Coin from the reign of Léopold, 1720.

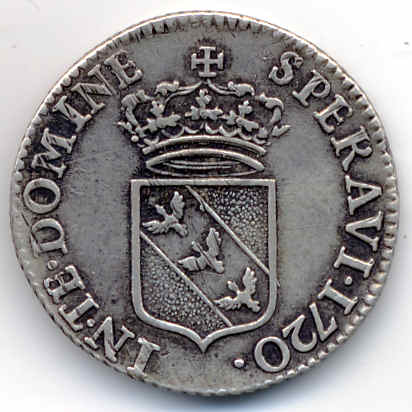
The reverse of the coin, 1720

In 1721, Leopold arranged for his eldest surviving son and heir, Leopold Clement, to receive an education at Vienna. He also intended to forge relations with Archduchess Maria Theresa, the heiress of Emperor Charles VI. However, Leopold Clement died shortly afterwards at Lunéville and in his stead, the next eldest son Francis Stephen went to Vienna, where he married Maria Theresa. Francis would become Emperor and his descendants, the House of Habsburg-Lorraine, would rule Austria until 1918.

In 1725, Leopold tried to arrange his daughter Anne Charlotte to marry the young King Louis XV, but Louis Henry, Duke of Bourbon, then prime minister, prevented a union with a descendant of the rival House of Orléans. Then, Élisabeth Charlotte tried to arrange her daughter's marriage to her first cousin, the recently widowed Louis, Duke of Orléans, but Louis refused. All proposals of marriage being either ignored or declined, Anne Charlotte later became Abbess of the monasteries Remiremont and Essen.

In March 1729, Leopold caught a fever while walking at the Château at Ménil near Lunéville. He returned to Lunéville where he died on 27 March, aged 49.

== Ancestry ==
Ancestors of Leopold, Duke of Lorraine

8. Francis II, Duke of Lorraine
4. Nicholas Francis, Duke of Lorraine
9. Christina of Salm
2. Charles V, Duke of Lorraine
10. Henry II, Duke of Lorraine
5. Claude Françoise of Lorraine
11. Margherita Gonzaga
1. Leopold, Duke of Lorraine
12. Ferdinand II, Holy Roman Emperor
6. Ferdinand III, Holy Roman Emperor
13. Maria Anna of Bavaria
3. Eleonore of Austria
14. Charles II Gonzaga, Duke of Nevers
7. Eleonora Gonzaga
15. Maria Gonzaga, Duchess of Montferrat

== Issue ==
Leopold and Élisabeth Charlotte had 14 children in just 16 years:

- Léopold (26 Aug 1699 - 2 April 1700), first crown prince, died in infancy.
- Élisabeth Charlotte Gabrièle (21 Oct 1700 - 4 May 1711), died in childhood.
- Louise Christine (13 Nov 1701 - 18 Nov 1701), died in infancy.
- Marie Gabrièle Charlotte (30 Dec 1702 - 11 May 1711), died in childhood.
- Louis (28 Jan 1704 - 10 May 1711), second crown prince, died in childhood.
- Josepha Gabrièle (16 Feb 1705 - 25 Mar 1708), died in early childhood.
- Gabrièle Louise (4 Mar 1706 - 13 June 1710), died in early childhood.
- Léopold Clement Charles (25 April 1707 - 4 June 1723), third crown prince, died in adolescence.
- Francis Stephen (8 Dec 1708 - 18 Aug 1765), fourth crown prince and his successor, married Maria Theresa of Austria and became Holy Roman Emperor.
- Eléonore (4 June 1710 - 28 July 1710), died in infancy.
- Elisabeth Therese (15 Oct 1711 - 3 July 1741), married in 1737 Charles Emmanuel III of Sardinia.
- Charles Alexander Emmanuel (12 Dec 1712 - 4 July 1780), governor of the Austrian Netherlands and army commander.
- Anne Charlotte (1714 - 1773), abbess at Essen.
- Stillborn daughter (28 November 1715).

== See also ==
- Dukes of Lorraine family tree

Regnal titles
Preceded by Charles V	Duke of Lorraine; 1690–1729	Succeeded by Francis (III) Stephen
Vacant Title last held by Elizabeth Lucretia	Duke of Teschen; 1722–1729	Succeeded by Francis (III) Stephen
