= Élisabeth Charlotte d'Orléans =

Duchess of Lorraine from 1698 to 1729

- Princess of Commercy
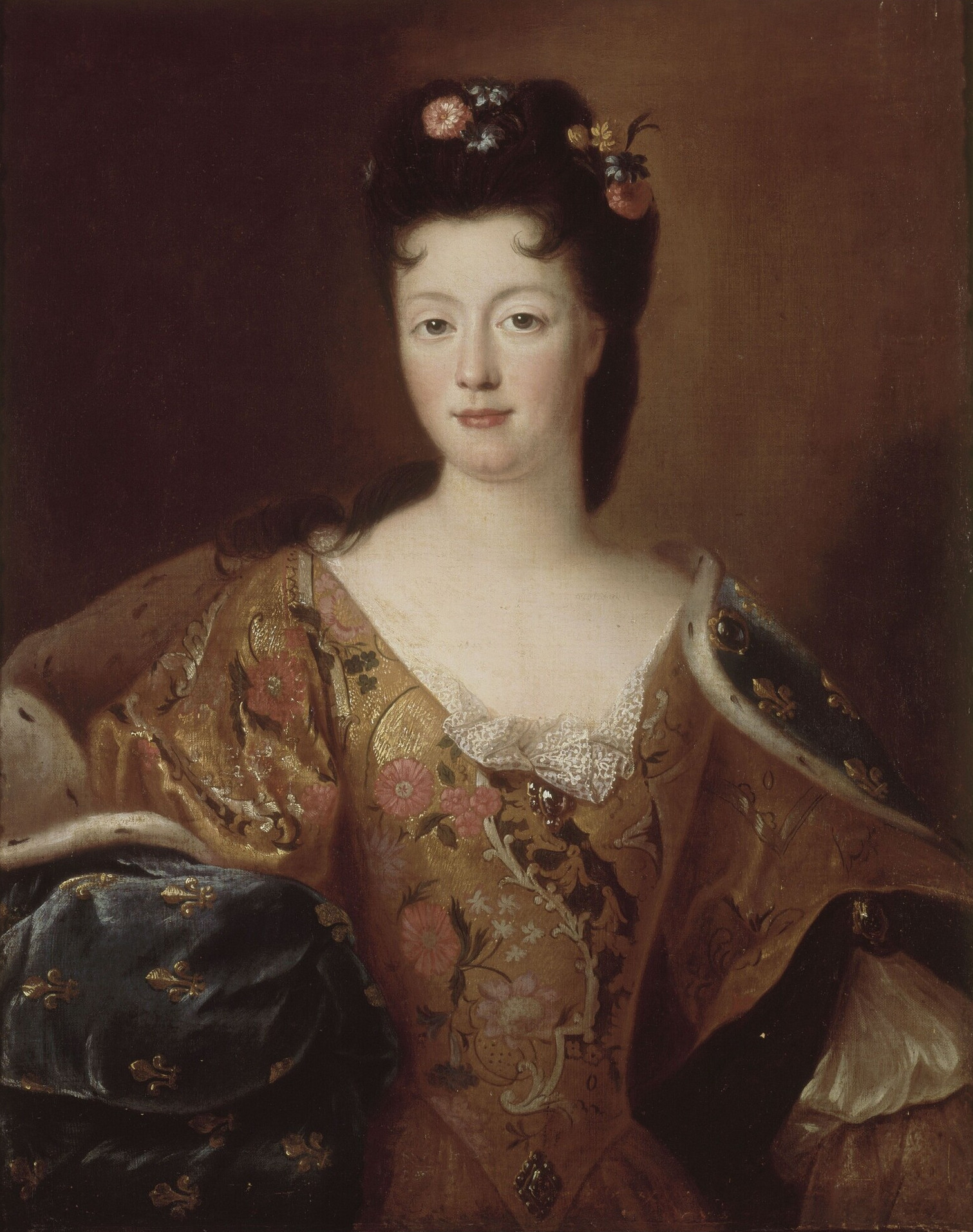

Duchess consort of Lorraine
- Tenure: 13 October 1698 – 27 March 1729

Duchess consort of Teschen
- Tenure: 12 May 1722 – 27 March 1729

Princess of Commercy
- Reign: 9 July 1737 – 23 December 1744
- Successor: Stanislas
- Born: 13 September 1676; Château de Saint-Cloud, Kingdom of France
- Died: 23 December 1744 (aged 68); Château de Commercy, Duchy of Lorraine, Holy Roman Empire
- Burial: Church of Saint-François-des-Cordeliers, Nancy, France
- Spouse: Leopold, Duke of Lorraine (m. 1698; died 1729)
- Issue Detail: Princess Élisabeth Charlotte; Louis, Hereditary Prince of Lorraine; Léopold Clément, Hereditary Prince of Lorraine; Francis I, Holy Roman Emperor; Elisabeth Therese, Queen of Sardinia; Charles Alexander, Governor of the Austrian Netherlands; Anne Charlotte, Abbess of Essen
- House: Orléans
- Father: Philippe I, Duke of Orléans
- Mother: Elisabeth Charlotte of the Palatinate

Élisabeth Charlotte d'Orléans (13 September 1676 – 23 December 1744) was a petite-fille de France as grand-daughter of king Louis XIII, and duchess of Lorraine and Bar by her marriage to Duke Leopold. She was regent of the duchy during the minority (1729–1730) and absence (1730–1737) of her son and suo jure princess of Commercy from 1737–1744. Among her children was Francis I, Holy Roman Emperor, the co-founder of the House of Habsburg-Lorraine.

== Early life ==
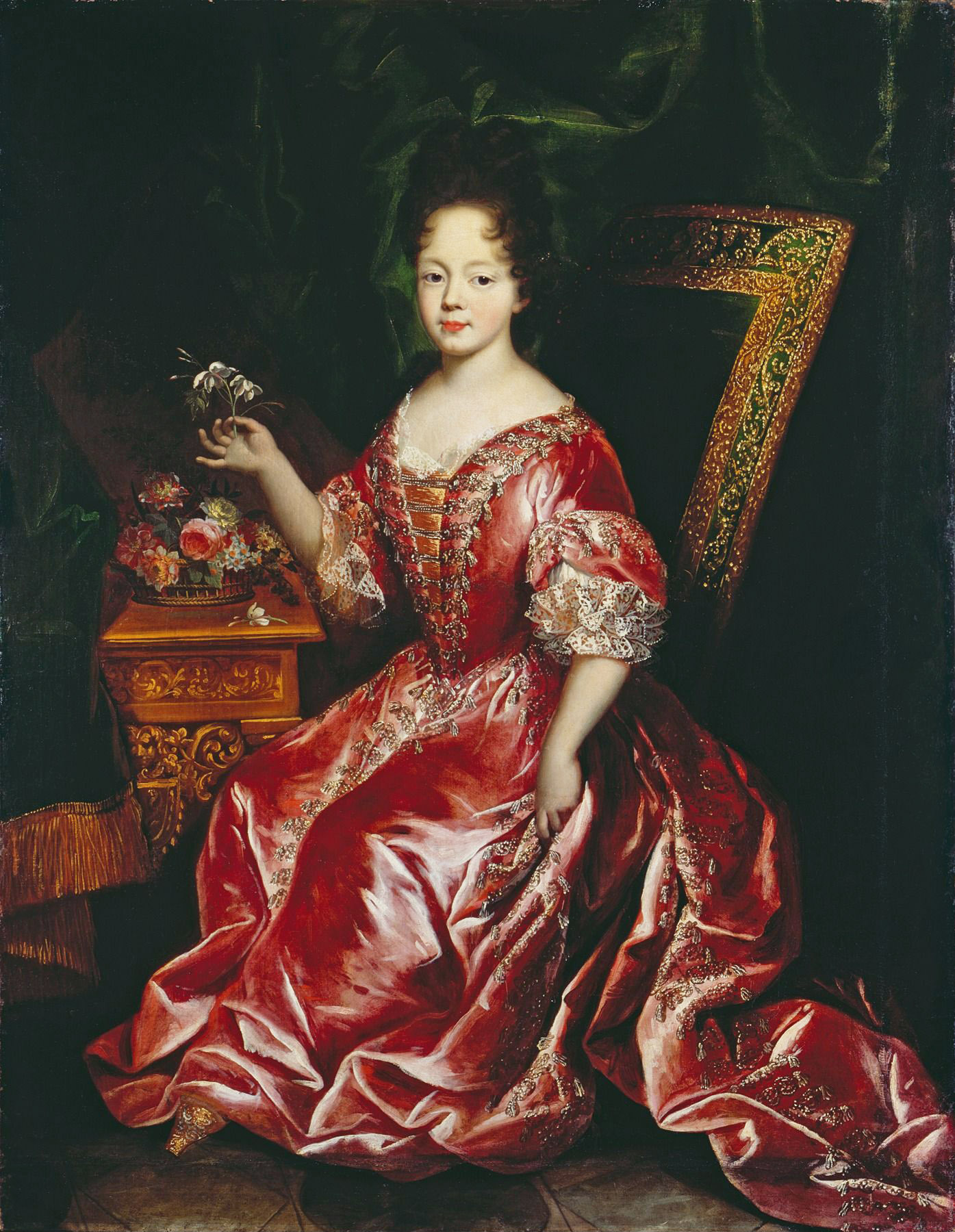
Portrait of Princess Élisabeth Charlotte (by Louis Ferdinand Elle the Younger, c. 1685)

Élisabeth Charlotte was born on 13 September 1676 at the Château de Saint-Cloud, located outside of Paris, France. She was the third child and first daughter of Philippe I, Duke of Orléans, Monsieur, and his second wife, Elizabeth Charlotte, Madame Palatine, the daughter of Charles I Louis, Elector Palatine. Her father was the only sibling of King Louis XIV. As a petite-fille de France, she was entitled to the style of Her Royal Highness, as well as the right to an armchair in the presence of the king. At birth, she was given the style of mademoiselle de Chartres, taken from the name of one of her father's appanages. After the marriage of her two older half-sisters, Marie Louise and Anne Marie (born of the first marriage of their father to Henrietta of England), she was known as Madame Royale, according to her status as the highest-ranking unmarried princess in France.

As a child, Élisabeth Charlotte was described by her mother as 'so terribly wild' and 'rough as a boy'. To her father's displeasure, she shared the frank opinions of her mother.

== Marriage ==
Her mother wanted her to marry as prestigiously as her sisters had. When her cousin's wife, Maria Anna, the dauphine, suggested she should marry her younger brother Joseph Clemens of Bavaria, Élisabeth Charlotte reportedly said, 'I am not made, madam, for a younger son'. Élisabeth's mother initially wanted her to marry King William III of England but him being a Protestant prevented the marriage.

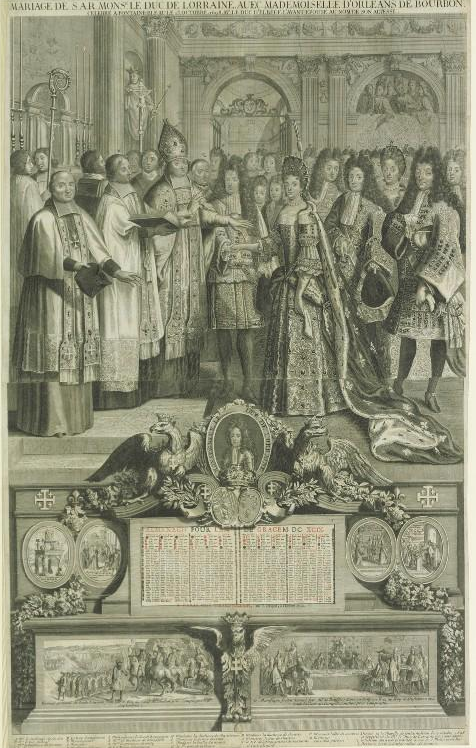
Proxy marriage of the Duke of Lorraine and Élisabeth Charlotte by an unknown artist

Joseph I, Holy Roman Emperor was also considered. He was highly regarded, and the union would have been a way of reconciling the Bourbons and their traditional rivals, the Habsburgs. Her widowed cousin, Louis, Grand Dauphin was considered, as well as his son, Louis, Duke of Burgundy, and another cousin, the legitimised Louis Auguste, Duke of Maine, eldest son of Louis XIV and Madame de Montespan. Élisabeth Charlotte's mother opposed any match between her children and the legitimised offspring of the king.

Élisabeth Charlotte was finally married on 13 October 1698 at the Palace of Fontainebleau to Leopold, Duke of Lorraine, son of Charles V, Duke of Lorraine, and Archduchess Eleonora of Austria. The marriage was the result of the Peace of Ryswick, one of its conditions being that the Duchy of Lorraine, which had been the possession of France for many years, be restored to the House of Lorraine. Élisabeth Charlotte was an instrument to cement the peace treaty; her mother later said that her daughter 'was a victim of war'.

== Duchess of Lorraine ==
The marriage was seen as a brilliant match by the House of Lorraine, but some regarded it as unworthy of a petite-fille de France. The bride brought a dowry of 900,000 livres. Because of these conflicts, some ladies of the royal family used the death of a small son of the duke of Maine to attend the wedding in mourning clothes.

To everyone's surprise, what had been expected to be an unhappy union turned out to be a marriage full of love and happiness; it produced fourteen children in just sixteen years. After the birth of her children, Élisabeth Charlotte showed great maternal instinct and a naturally caring character. Unfortunately, most of the children died young; only four survived into mature adulthood. Three of them died within a week in May 1711 due to a smallpox outbreak. The duchess, pregnant for the eleventh time, was devastated: of the ten children she had given birth to, only two were left. She would give birth to four more children, three of whom would survive to adulthood.

Élisabeth Charlotte was religiously intolerant and supported the persecution of non-Catholics. She persuaded her husband to issue many oppressive laws against Protestants and Jews. During this time, over 280 religious dissenters were burned at the stake.

In June 1701, her father died after having a heated argument with Louis XIV at Versailles about the duke of Chartres. Her brother thus became the new duke of Orléans and head of the House of Orléans. Her mother was left at the mercy of Louis XIV, who forbade her from going abroad. As a result, Élisabeth Charlotte was only able to see her mother if she went to Versailles; they maintained a correspondence, which was destroyed in a 1719 fire at the Château de Lunéville.

In 1708, after ten years of marriage, her husband took a mistress, Anne-Marguerite de Ligniville, Princess of Beauveau-Craon. Embarrassed, Élisabeth Charlotte took her mother's advice, remained silent and lived with her husband and his mistress. Around this time, she was also ill, suffering from heavy coughing, fainting, and fevers. Ligniville remained the favourite of the duke until his death in 1729.

On the death of Louis XIV in 1715, her brother became the regent of France for the five-year-old king, Louis XV. In 1718, when she briefly visited the French court, her niece, Marie Louise, Dowager Duchess of Berry gave a lavish reception in her honour at Luxembourg Palace. More than a hundred hors d'œuvres, thirty-two soups, sixty entrées, a hundred and thirty hot and sixty cold entremets, and many other courses were served. Almost four hundred partridges and pheasants, eighty-two pigeons, and more than a hundred sweetbreads were used. Then, as dessert, a hundred baskets of fresh fruit, almost as much dried fruit, fifty dishes of iced fruit and more than a hundred kinds of compote was given. Upon leaving France, her husband was accorded the style of Royal Highness, usually reserved for members of foreign dynasties headed by a king.

== Regent of Lorraine ==
Her husband died in 1729, leaving his wife regent of Lorraine for their son, Francis Stephen who had been raised in Vienna. He returned home in 1730 for the investiture of his mother as regent, but then continued to live in Austria. During this time, Élisabeth Charlotte tried to engage her daughter, Anne Charlotte to Louis XV; this project failed due to the intrigues of Louis Henri, Duke of Bourbon. She then tried to arrange a marriage for Anne Charlotte to her nephew, Louis, Duke of Orléans, who had been recently widowed, but the devout duke chose not to remarry.

== Princess of Commercy ==
Unable to prevent her son from giving up the duchy of Lorraine to Stanisław Leszczyński when he married the Habsburg heiress, Maria Theresa, Élisabeth Charlotte moved into the Château de Commercy in nearby Commercy. This commune was then made into a sovereign principality for her dowager years.

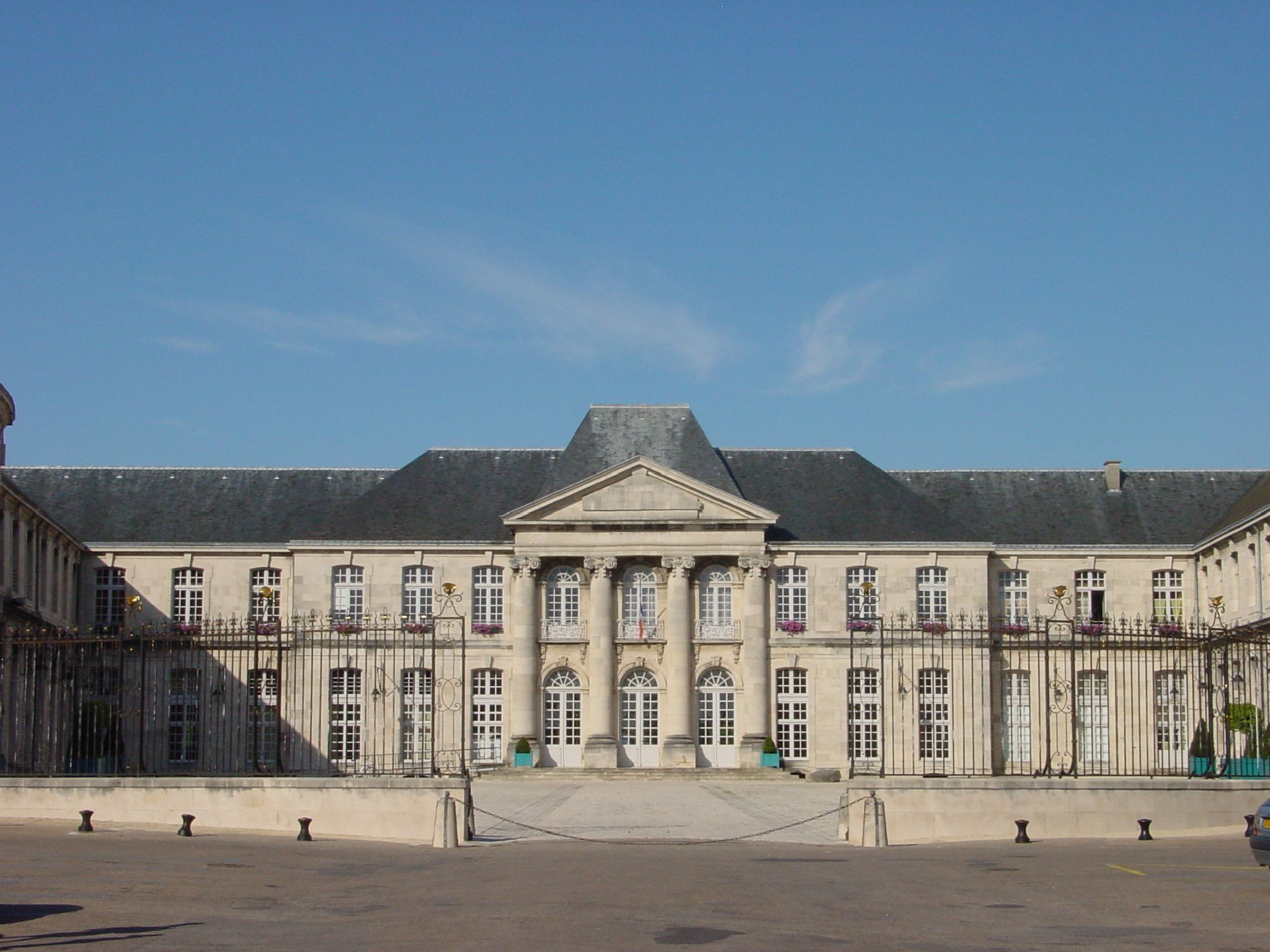
The Château de Commercy where she died in 1744

In 1737, her daughter, Elisabeth Therese married Charles Emmanuel III of Sardinia. She died in 1741, giving birth to Prince Benedetto, Duke of Chablais. On 7 January 1744 her youngest son, Prince Charles Alexander of Lorraine, married Archduchess Maria Anna of Austria, who died in childbirth on 16 December 1744.

=== Death and burial ===
Élisabeth Charlotte died of a stroke at the age of sixty-eight on 23 December 1744, one week after her daughter-in-law and grandchild. She was the last of her siblings to die and had outlived all but three of her children. Nine months after her death, her son Francis Stephen became Holy Roman emperor. She was buried in the funerary chapel of the dukes of Lorraine in the Church of Saint-François-des-Cordeliers church in Nancy.

== Legacy ==
In 1696, Charles Perrault dedicated his Les Contes de ma mère l'Oye, (known in English as Mother Goose Tales) to her. Élisabeth Charlotte authorised the construction of a hospital in Bruyères. In 1730, she offered to the church of Mattaincourt a gilded wooden shrine for the relics of Pierre Fourier, a former parish priest who had been beatified on 29 January 1730. The modern Basilica of Saint Pierre Fourier of Mattaincourt was built in 1853 on the site of this former church.

== Issue ==
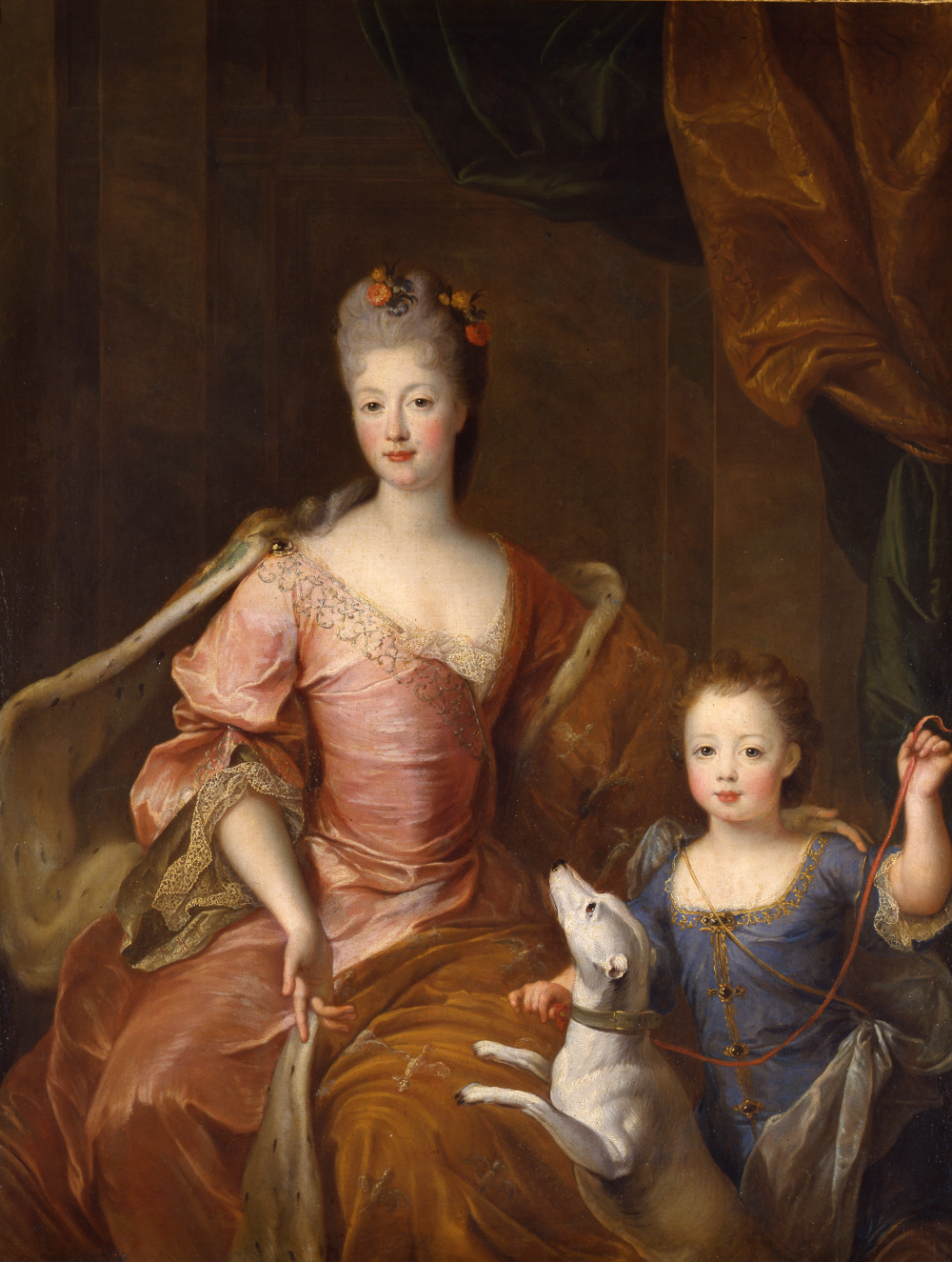
Portrait of Élisabeth Charlotte with her son Louis, and a dog (by Pierre Gobert, c. 1706).

Élisabeth Charlotte was constantly pregnant during much of her marriage, giving birth almost once a year:

1. Léopold, Hereditary Prince of Lorraine (26 August 1699 – 2 April 1700); died in infancy.
2. Élisabeth Charlotte Gabrièle of Lorraine (21 October 1700 – 4 May 1711); died in childhood of smallpox.
3. Louise Christine of Lorraine (13 November 1701 – 18 November 1701); died in infancy.
4. Marie Gabrièle Charlotte of Lorraine (30 December 1702 – 11 May 1711); died in childhood of smallpox.
5. Louis, Hereditary Prince of Lorraine (28 January 1704 – 10 May 1711); died in childhood of smallpox.
6. Joséphine Gabrièle of Lorraine (16 February 1705 – 25 March 1708); died in childhood.
7. Gabrièle Louise of Lorraine (4 March 1706 – 13 June 1710); died in childhood.
8. Léopold Clément Charles, Hereditary Prince of Lorraine (25 April 1707 – 4 June 1723); died unmarried and without issue.
9. Francis Stephen of Lorraine (8 December 1708 – 18 August 1765); married Archduchess Maria Theresa of Austria, had issue. He later became the Holy Roman Emperor.
10. Eléonore of Lorraine (4 June 1710 – 28 July 1710); died in infancy.
11. Elisabeth Therese of Lorraine (15 October 1711 – 3 July 1741); married Charles Emmanuel III of Sardinia, became Queen of Sardinia, had issue.
12. Charles Alexandre Emanuel of Lorraine (12 December 1712 – 4 July 1780); married Maria Anna of Austria and had no surviving issue but had illegitimate children.
13. Anne Charlotte of Lorraine (17 May 1714 – 7 November 1773); died unmarried and without issue. Became abbess of Remiremont, Mons and Essen.
14. Stillborn daughter (28 November 1715)

== Ancestors ==
Ancestors of Élisabeth Charlotte d'Orléans

8. Henry IV of France
4. Louis XIII of France
9. Marie de' Medici
2. Philippe I, Duke of Orléans
10. Philip III of Spain
5. Anne of Austria
11. Margaret of Austria
1. Élisabeth Charlotte of Orléans
12. Frederick V of the Palatinate
6. Charles I Louis, Elector Palatine
13. Elizabeth Stuart
3. Elisabeth Charlotte of the Palatinate
14. William V, Landgrave of Hesse-Kassel
7. Charlotte of Hesse-Kassel
15. Amalie Elisabeth of Hanau-Münzenberg

Élisabeth Charlotte d'Orléans House of Orléans Cadet branch of the House of Bourbon Born: 13 September 1676 Died: 23 December 1744
French nobility
Preceded by Marie Anne d'Orléans	Mademoiselle de Chartres; 1676–1698	Succeeded by Louise Adélaïde d'Orléans
French royalty
Vacant Title last held by Eleonore of Austria	Duchess consort of Lorraine and Bar; 1698–1729	Vacant Title next held by Maria Theresa of Austria
Preceded by New creation	Princess of Commercy; 1737–1744	Succeeded by Stanisław Leszczyński
