= Léopold Clément, Hereditary Prince of Lorraine =

Heir to the Duchy of Lorraine (1707–1723)

Léopold Clément
- Hereditary Prince of Lorraine
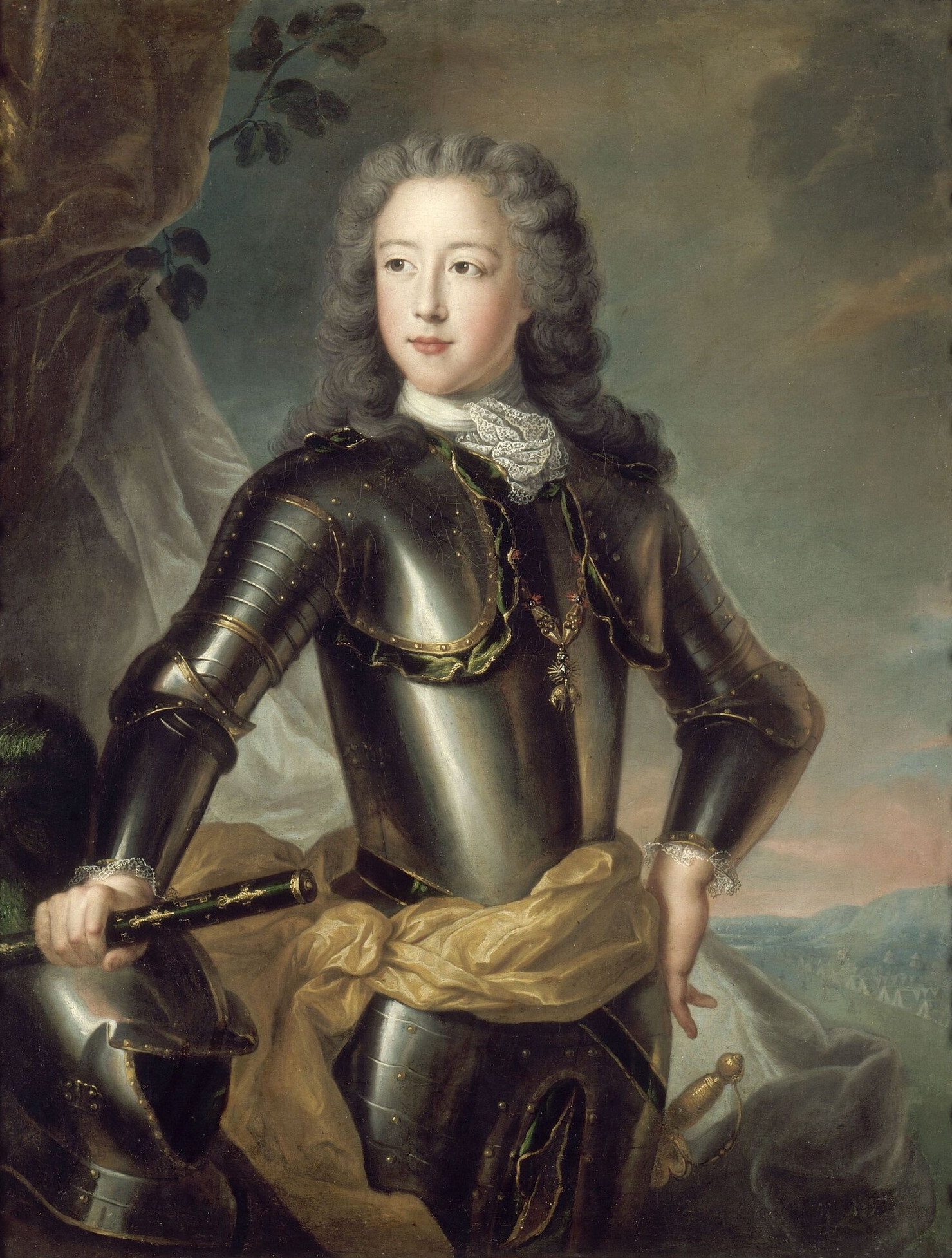
- Portrait by Pierre Gobert, c.1722
- Born: 25 April 1707; Château de Lunéville, Lorraine
- Died: 4 June 1723 (aged 16); Château de Lunéville, Lorraine
- Burial: Church of Saint-François-des-Cordeliers, Nancy, Lorraine
Names
- Léopold Clément Charles de Lorraine
- House: Lorraine
- Father: Leopold, Duke of Lorraine
- Mother: Élisabeth Charlotte d'Orléans

Léopold Clément, Hereditary Prince of Lorraine (Léopold Clément Charles; 25 April 1707 – 4 June 1723) was heir apparent to the throne of the sovereign Duchy of Lorraine.

His father was the reigning Duke of Lorraine and his mother a member of the House of Bourbon, then ruling the Kingdom of France. He became the Hereditary Prince at the death of his older brother Louis in 1711, but died of smallpox in 1723 at the age of sixteen, unmarried and without descendants.

== Biography ==
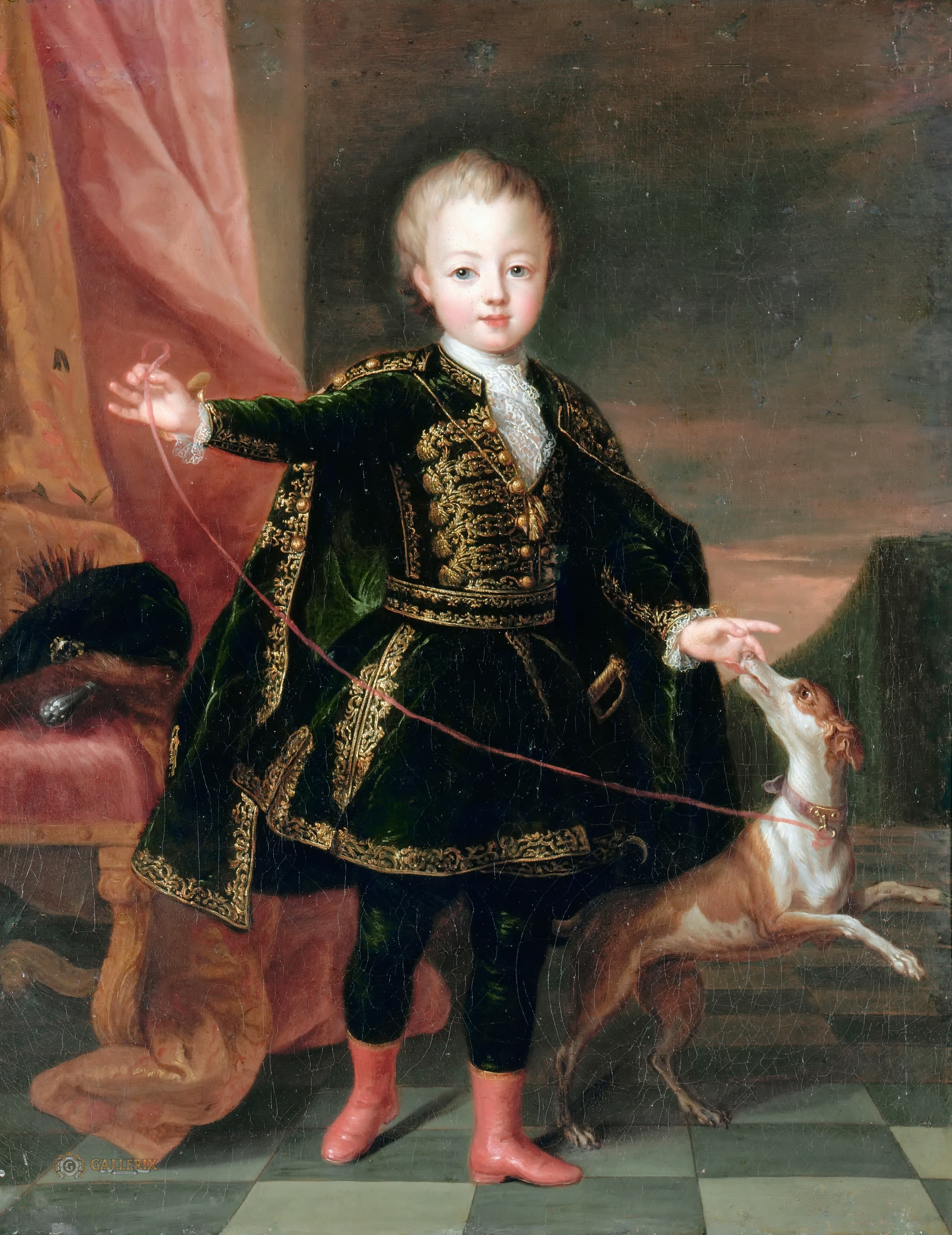
Prince Leopold in 1710, portrait by Pierre Gobert.

He was born at the Château de Lunéville to Léopold, Duke of Lorraine and his wife Élisabeth Charlotte d'Orléans.

Léopold was the third son born to his parents. His eldest brother, also Léopold (1699–1700), died aged eight months. Three other older siblings died in an outbreak of smallpox at Lunéville: Élisabeth Charlotte (1700–1711), Marie Gabrièle Charlotte (1702–1711) and Louis (1704–1711). The smallpox epidemic had killed other royalty such as the Grand Dauphin and the Holy Roman Emperor Joseph I at the same time.

In 1722 Léopold also became the heir to the Duchy of Teschen which was given to his father in compensation for his father's maternal grandmother's rights to the Duchy of Montferrat in northern Italy, which Emperor Charles VI had taken and given to his allies, the Dukes of Savoy.

In 1723 he was sent to Vienna to carry out his education under the supervision of Charles VI, his father's first cousin. Another reason for his journey was to forge a Habsburg-Lorraine alliance through a marriage with the Archduchess Maria Theresa.

Soon afterward the prince caught smallpox at Lunéville and quickly died at the Château there. He was buried in the Ducal Crypt at the Church of Saint-François-des-Cordeliers, Nancy. His younger brother Francis Stephen became the Hereditary Prince and later married Maria Theresa, Habsburg heiress and future Queen regnant of Hungary and Bohemia.

== Ancestry ==
Ancestors of Léopold Clément, Hereditary Prince of Lorraine

8. Nicholas II, Duke of Lorraine
4. Charles V, Duke of Lorraine
9. Claude Françoise of Lorraine
2. Leopold, Duke of Lorraine
10. Ferdinand III, Holy Roman Emperor
5. Eleanor of Austria
11. Eleonora Gonzaga
1. Léopold Clément, Hereditary Prince of Lorraine
12. Louis XIII of France
6. Philippe I, Duke of Orléans
13. Anne of Austria
3. Élisabeth Charlotte d'Orléans
14. Charles I Louis, Elector Palatine
7. Elizabeth Charlotte of the Palatinate
15. Charlotte of Hesse-Kassel

== References and notes ==
Léopold Clément, Hereditary Prince of Lorraine House of Lorraine Born: 25 April 1707 Died: 4 June 1723
Preceded by Louis of Lorraine	Hereditary Prince of Lorraine; 10 May 1711 – 4 June 1723	Succeeded by Francis Stephen of Lorraine
