= Prince Leopold Clement =

Prince Leopold Clement may refer to:

- Léopold Clément, Hereditary Prince of Lorraine (1707–1723), heir apparent to Duchy of Lorraine
- Prince Leopold Clement of Saxe-Coburg and Gotha (1878–1916), Austro-Hungarian officer; heir apparent to House of Koháry's wealth
