= Louis, Hereditary Prince of Lorraine =

Heir to the Duchy of Lorraine (1704–1711)

Louis
- Hereditary Prince of Lorraine
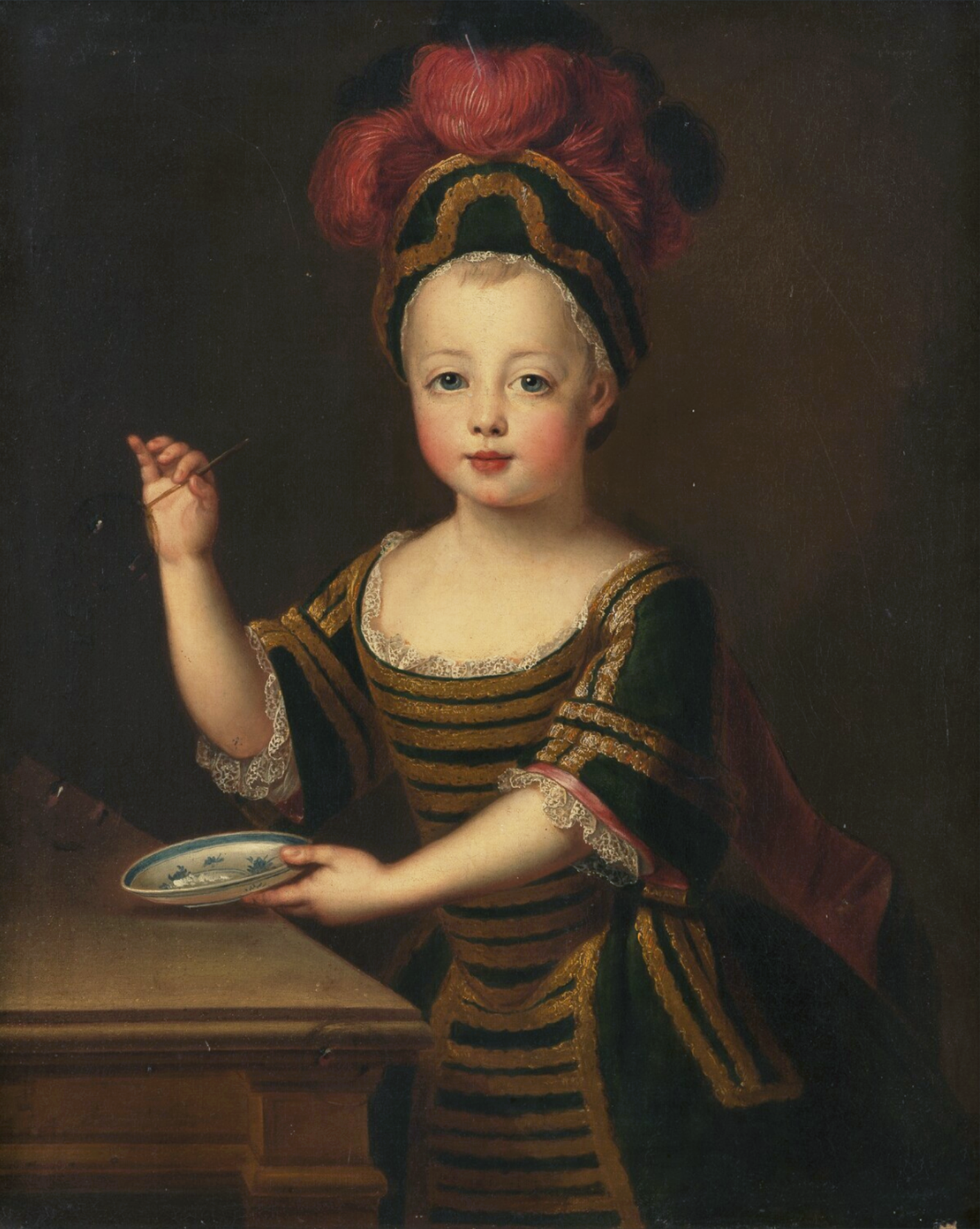
- Louis by Pierre Gobert,
- Born: 28 January 1704; Château de Lunéville, Lorraine
- Died: 10 May 1711 (aged 7); Château de Lunéville, Lorraine
- Burial: Église Saint-François-des-Cordeliers
- House: Lorraine
- Father: Leopold, Duke of Lorraine
- Mother: Élisabeth Charlotte d'Orléans

Louis, Hereditary Prince of Lorraine (28 January 1704 – 10 May 1711) was heir apparent to the throne of the sovereign Duchy of Lorraine.

His father was the reigning Duke of Lorraine and his mother a member of the House of Bourbon, then ruling the Kingdom of France. He became the Hereditary Prince at his birth in 1704, but died of smallpox in 1711 at the age of seven, unmarried and without descendants.

== Biography ==
He was born at the Château de Lunéville to Léopold, Duke of Lorraine and his wife Élisabeth Charlotte d'Orléans.

Louis was the fifth child but second son born to his parents. Also, Louis was the second of the four heirs of his father: his older brother Prince Léopold, Duke of Bar (26 August 1699 – 2 April 1700) died aged eight months; his younger brother Léopold Clément Charles (25 April 1707 – 4 June 1723) died aged sixteen and his younger brother François Etienne/Stephen lived to adulthood, became the Duke of Lorraine and also, via his marriage; became Holy Roman Emperor and founded the House of Habsburg-Lorraine.

Soon after his birth, on 24 June 1704, the young prince was baptised as a Roman Catholic at the Château de Lunéville. He did not see the deaths of two of his siblings: Louis, Duke of Bar (26 August 1699 – 2 April 1700) and Princess Louise Christine (13 November 1701 – 18 November 1701) both died before reaching the age of one. By the time of his birth, however, two sisters had survived.

An epidemic of smallpox was going around Europe in the Spring of 1711. It had already killed people like the Holy Roman Emperor Joseph I (who died on 17 April) and the Grand Dauphin, Louis (who died on 14 April). Unfortunately, against all efforts, Princess Élisabeth Charlotte of Lorraine, Louis' older sister, contracted smallpox and died on 4 May. Before this, she passed the disease on to Louis and Princess Marie Gabrièle Charlotte. Louis died on 10 May and Marie Gabrièle Charlotte died the very next day. They were both buried in the ducal crypt at the Église Saint-François-des-Cordeliers. At Louis' death, his younger brother Léopold Clement Charles became Hereditary Prince, but he, too died of smallpox in 1723, at the age of sixteen.

== Ancestry ==
Ancestors of Louis, Hereditary Prince of Lorraine

16. Francis II, Duke of Lorraine
8. Nicholas II, Duke of Lorraine
17. Countess Christina of Salm
4. Charles V, Duke of Lorraine
18. Henry II, Duke of Lorraine
9. Claude-Françoise of Lorraine
19. Margerita Gonzaga
2. Leopold, Duke of Lorraine
20. Ferdinand II, Holy Roman Emperor
10. Ferdinand III, Holy Roman Emperor
21. Maria Anna of Bavaria
5. Eleonora Maria of Austria
22. Charles Gonzaga, Duke of Nevers
11. Eleanor Gonzaga
23. Maria Gonzaga
1. Louis de Lorraine
24. Henry IV of France
12. Louis XIII of France
25. Marie de' Medici
6. Philippe I, Duke of Orléans
26. Philip III of Spain
13. Anne of Austria
27. Margaret of Austria
3. Élisabeth Charlotte d'Orléans
28. Frederick V of the Palatinate
14. Charles I Louis, Elector Palatine
29. Elizabeth Stuart
7. Elizabeth Charlotte of the Palatinate
30. William V, Landgrave of Hesse-Kassel (or Hesse-Cassel)
15. Landgravine Charlotte of Hesse-Kassel (or Hesse-Cassel)
31. Countess Amalie Elisabeth of Hanau-Münzenberg

== References and notes ==
Louis, Hereditary Prince of Lorraine House of Lorraine Born: 28 January 1704 Died: 10 May 1711
French nobility
Vacant Title last held by Léopold, Duke of Bar	Hereditary Prince of Lorraine; 28 January 1704 – 10 May 1711	Succeeded by Léopold Clément Charles of Lorraine
