= Princess Élisabeth Charlotte of Lorraine =

Titular Abbess of Remiremont (1700–1711)

Élisabeth Charlotte
- Abbess of Remiremont (titular)
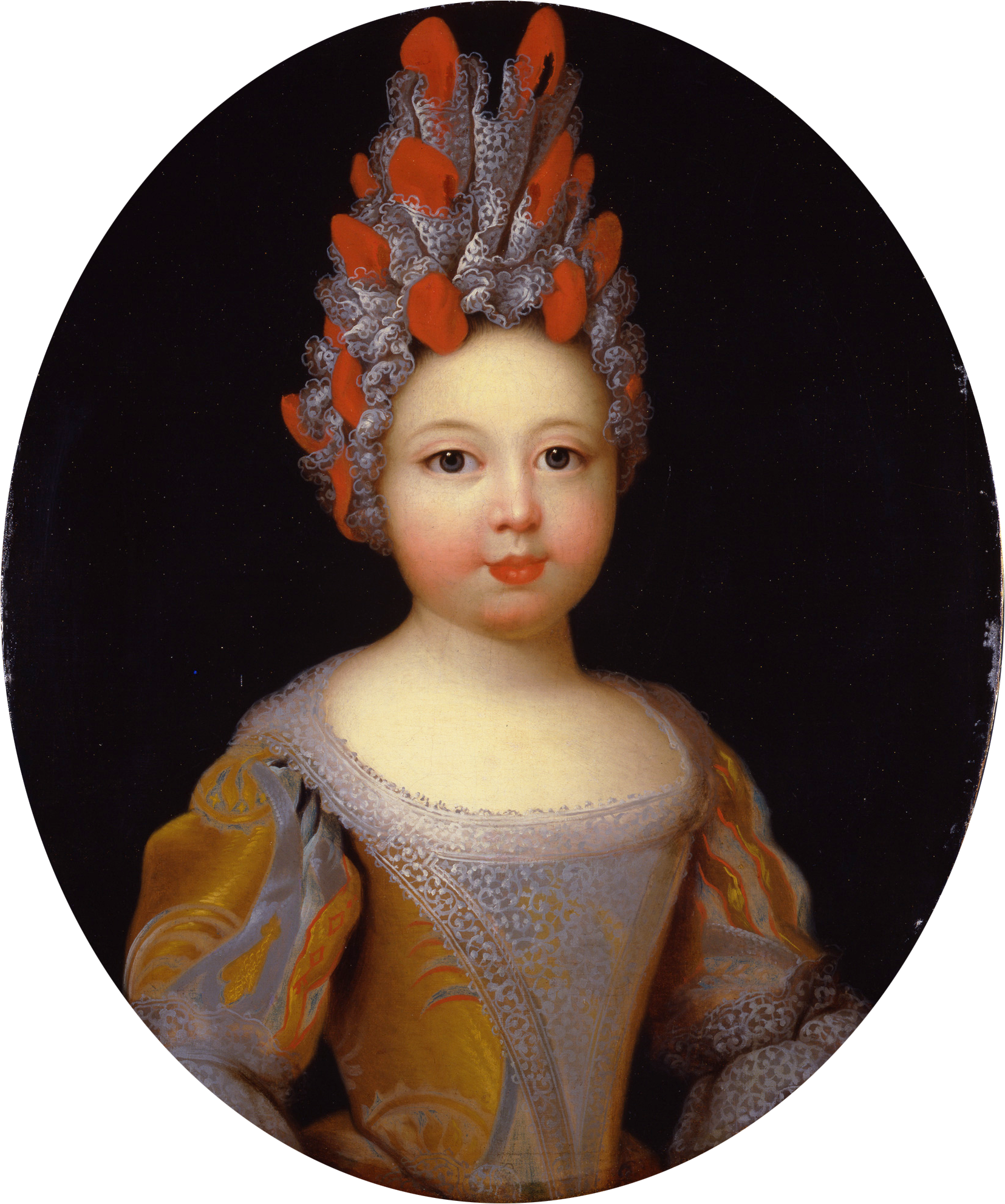
- Born: 21 October 1700; Ducal Palace of Nancy, Lorraine
- Died: 4 May 1711 (aged 10); Château de Lunéville, Lorraine
- Burial: Église Saint-François-des-Cordeliers, Nancy, Lorraine, France
Names
- Élisabeth Charlotte Gabrièle de Lorraine
- House: Lorraine
- Father: Léopold de Lorraine
- Mother: Élisabeth Charlotte d'Orléans

Élisabeth Charlotte of Lorraine (Élisabeth Charlotte Gabrièle; 21 October 1700 - 4 May 1711) was a Princess of Lorraine. She died of smallpox aged 10. She was the Titular Abbess of Remiremont.

== Biography ==
Élisabeth Charlotte Gabrièle de Lorraine was born at the Ducal Palace of Lorraine, in Nancy, the capital of the Duchy of Lorraine in which her father was the reigning Duke. Her mother was a member of the House of Bourbon, then ruling the Kingdom of France.

She was the couple's first daughter and second child, an older brother had been born the previous year.

Her father, Leopold, Duke of Lorraine, had wanted her to become the Abbess of the prestigious abbey at Remiremont, a Benedictine abbey near Remiremont, Vosges. The abbey had been closely associated with the House of Lorraine, many of its abbesses being members of the Lorraine family. Her father pressed the then abbess, Dorothea Maria of Salm to press the Professors in Sorbonne, the historic University of Paris in Paris. Louis XIV, her mother's uncle, instead imposed Élisabeth Charlotte as sovereign of the territory. Despite this, the professors did not reply before her death aged 10.

The princess died of smallpox at the Château de Lunéville ("country residence" of the Dukes of Lorraine) having passed the illness to her other brother, the Hereditary Prince of Lorraine and their younger sister Marie Gabrièle Charlotte. The three children died within seven days of each other. She was buried in the Ducal Crypt at the Church of Saint-François-des-Cordeliers, Nancy, France.

Her younger brother Francis Stephen became the Holy Roman Emperor. Her youngest sister, Anne Charlotte, whom she never met, was later Abbess of Remiremont. At the time of her death, her mother was pregnant with a future Queen of Sardinia.

== Ancestry ==
Ancestors of Princess Élisabeth Charlotte of Lorraine

8. Nicholas II, Duke of Lorraine
4. Charles V, Duke of Lorraine
9. Claude-Françoise of Lorraine
2. Leopold, Duke of Lorraine
10. Ferdinand III, Holy Roman Emperor
5. Eleonora Maria of Austria
11. Eleanor Gonzaga
1. Élisabeth Charlotte Gabrièle de Lorraine
12. Louis XIII of France
6. Philippe I, Duke of Orléans
13. Anne of Austria
3. Élisabeth Charlotte d'Orléans
14. Charles I Louis, Elector Palatine
7. Elizabeth Charlotte, Madame Palatine
15. Princess Charlotte of Hesse-Kassel
