= Church of Saint-François-des-Cordeliers =

Church in Meurthe-et-Moselle, France

Coordinates: 48.6978°N 6.1794°E

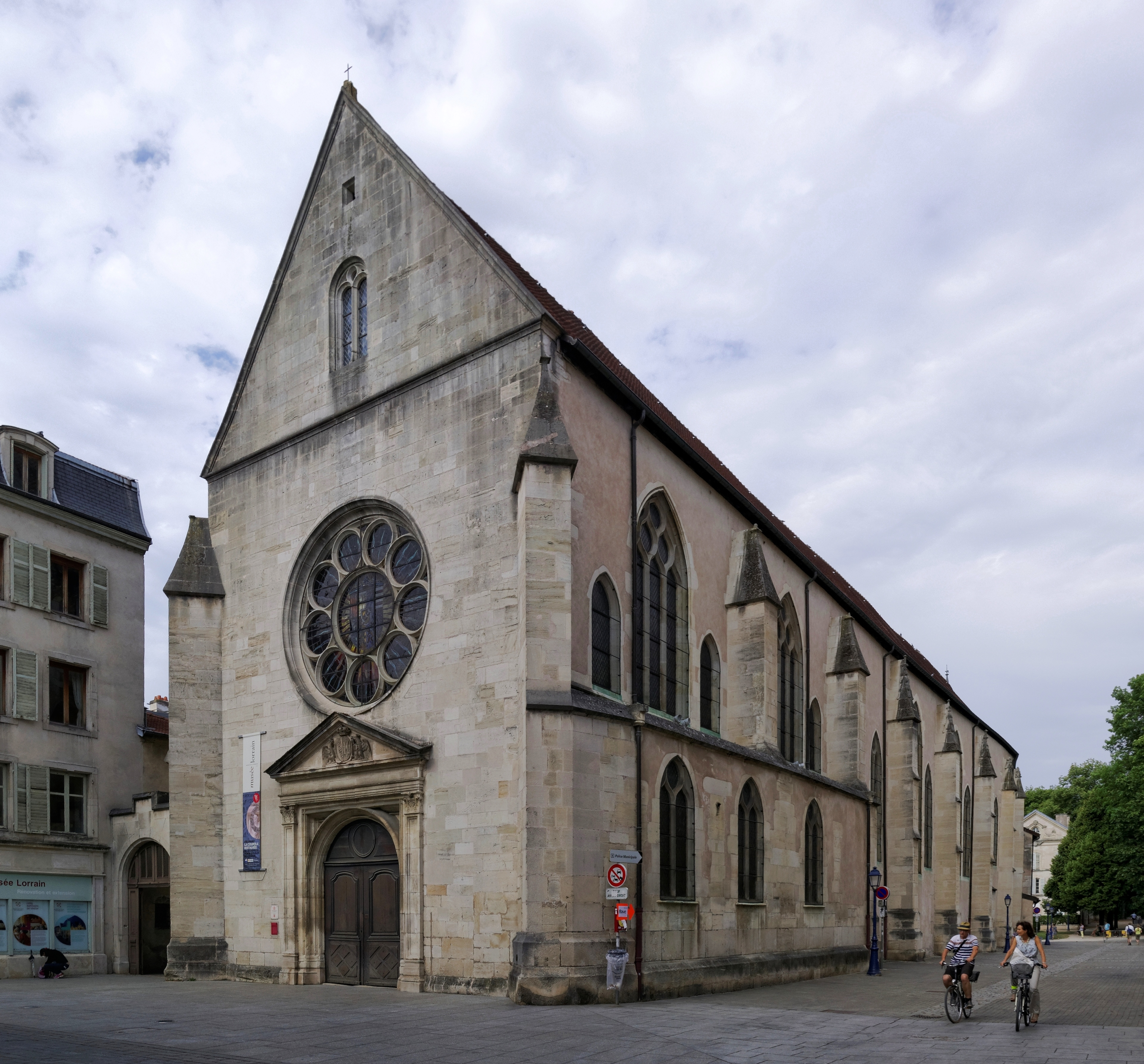
Church of Saint-François-des-Cordeliers in Nancy

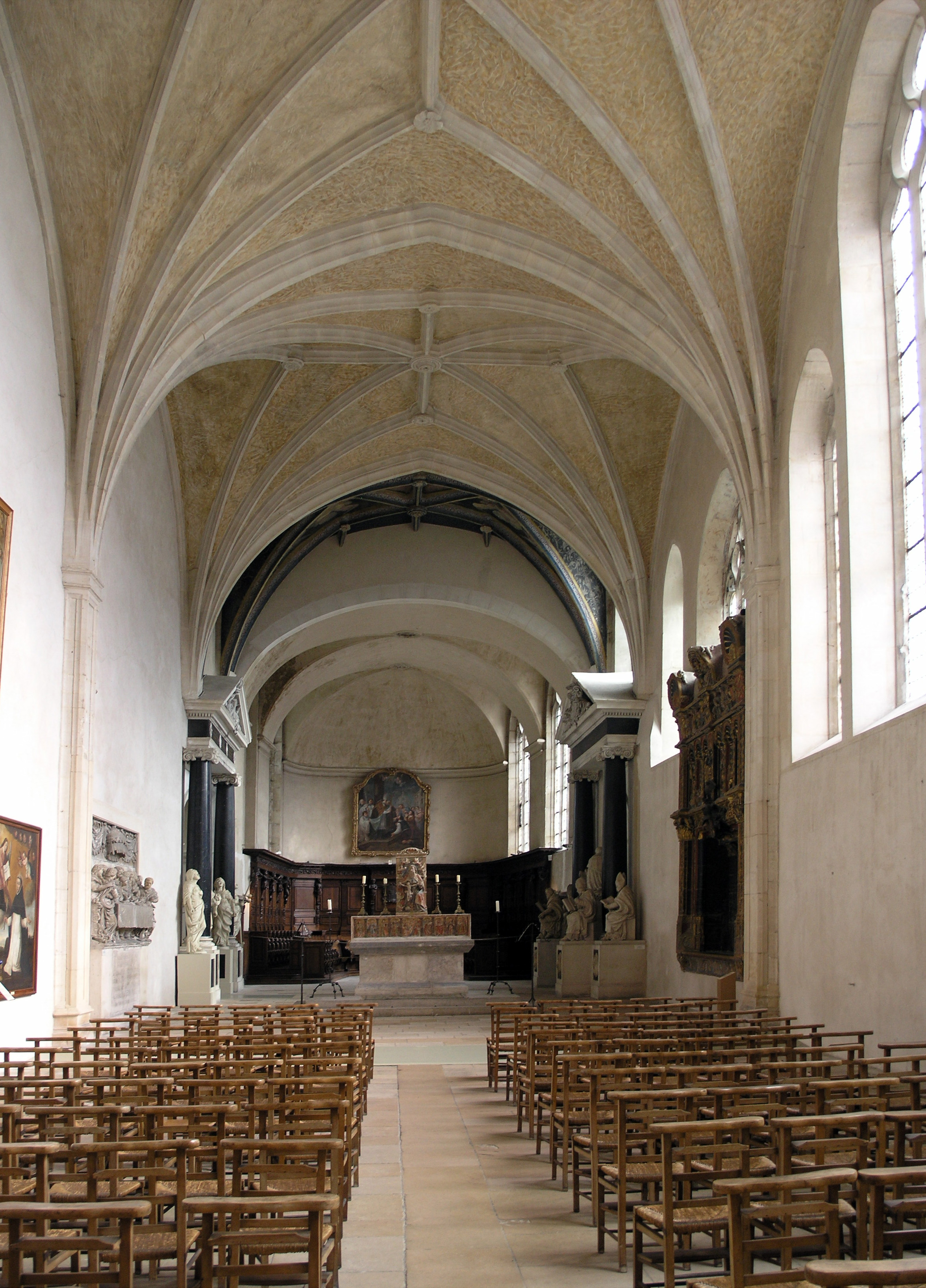
Interior

The Church of Saint-François-des-Cordeliers (French: Église des Cordeliers de Nancy) is a Roman Catholic church located in Nancy, France, capital city of Lorraine.

== History ==
It was constructed as part of a monastery under Duke René II of Lorraine following the Battle of Nancy, next to the Palace of the Dukes of Lorraine. It was consecrated in 1487. The monastery was Franciscan and the French name term cordelier refers to the simple rope belts the monks would tie their cassocks around. Since the monastery was under the patronage of the dukes, the church had close ties to the House of Lorraine and a number of its members were laid to rest there. Previously members of the family were laid to rest in St George's Collegiate Church, which does not exist anymore.

The church continued to keep its connection to the ducal house after Lorraine passed under royal French rule. Marie Antoinette of Austria stopped at the church to pray on her way to Paris for her marriage to her future husband King Louis XVI. Emperor Franz Joseph I of Austria also came to pray here in 1867.

Archduke Otto von Habsburg-Lothringen, heir to the Austro-Hungarian throne and head of the house of Lorraine, married here on May 10, 1951 to Princess Regina of Saxe-Meiningen. They returned here in 2001 for their golden jubilee. A requiem mass was also held here on 9 July 2011 in memory of the crown prince.

Each year, on the 3rd Saturday in October, a mass in memory of the family of the Dukes of Lorraine and Bar is celebrated by the parish priest of the Basilica of Saint-Epvre in the church of the Cordeliers.
