= Château de Lunéville =

Ducal residence in Lorraine, France

Palace of Lunéville
- Château de Lunéville (French)
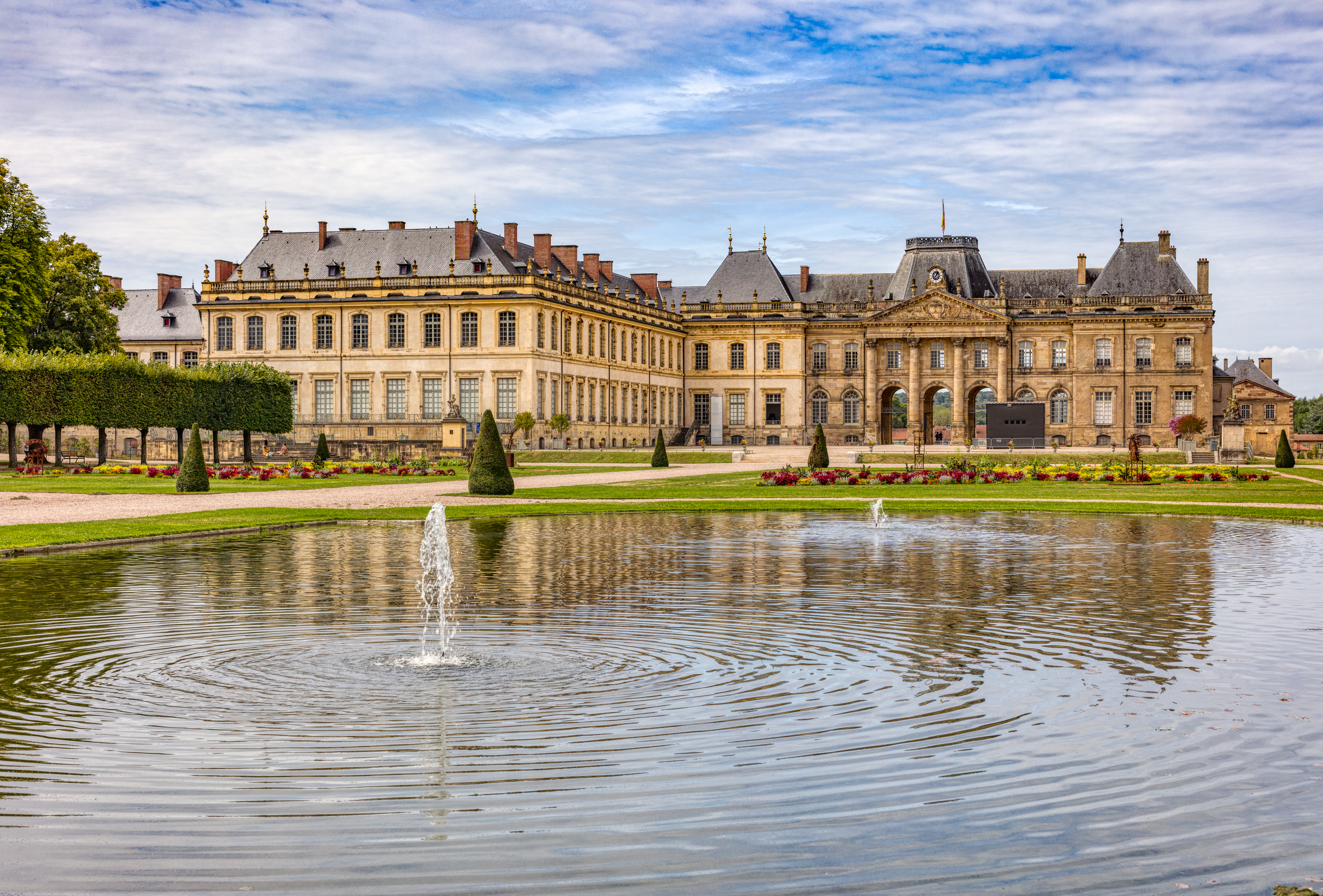
- Garden façade and fountains
- Interactive fullscreen map

General information
- Architectural style: Classicalism and Baroque
- Location: Lunéville, Lorraine
- Coordinates: 48°35′41″N 6°29′32″E
- Construction started: 1703
- Owner: Department Meurthe-et-Moselle

Website
- chateauluneville.meurthe-et-moselle.fr

The Palace of Lunéville (French: Château de Lunéville French pronunciation: [ʃɑto d(ə) lynevil]) is a residence of the Duke of Lorraine since the 13th century in Lunéville, about 35 kilometers east of Nancy, capital of Lorraine. The palace is owned by the Department Meurthe-et-Moselle since 2017. Many people visit the palace, park, or gardens of Lunéville every year, making it one of the most popular tourist attractions in the region.

A simple hunting lodge existed on the site since the 13th century. Substantial changes came with Duke Leopold I of Lorraine who expanded the château into the beginnings of a palace that went through several changes and phases from 1703 to 1720. It was a favourite residence of the former Polish king Stanislaus I, Duke of Lorraine and Bar, who made further improvements.

After the Duchy of Lorraine passed under the rule of the French crown, the palace was handed over to the military who used it largely as a barrack. A number of buildings disappeared during that time.

The French Ministry of Culture has placed the palace, its gardens, and some of its subsidiary structures on its list of culturally significant monuments as a Monument historique.

== History ==
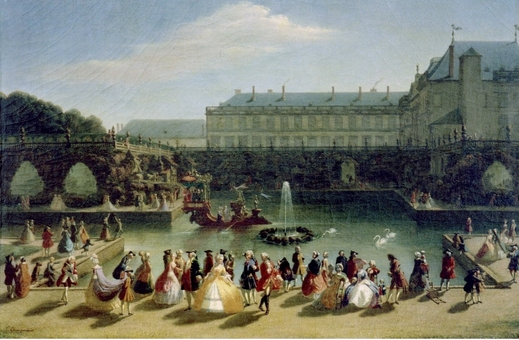
Festival at the rocher grotto in 1742, painting by Laurent Charpentier

The current castle occupies the location of an ancient fortification whose origins date back to around 1000s. No documents reveal the existence of a human settlement at this location before the end of the 10th century.

At that time, the site of Lunéville was owned by the powerful episcopal counts of Metz. Count Folmar had a castrum built there to control the crossing of the Vezouze River on the salt route, which went from Vic-sur-Seille to Deneuvre and Raon-l'Étape, leading to Sélestat and Alsace. The architectural details of this castrum are unknown, as it could have been a simple enclosure for collecting tolls.

In the second half of the 12th century, the land of Lunéville passed to a younger branch of the Folmar family with Hugues de Bliescastel, who took the title of Hugues I de Lunéville. A real fortress then succeeded the castrum. This construction, undertaken by Hugues I or his son Hugues II, represented the power of this new noble lineage. However, this power would be short-lived, as in 1243, the lordship of Lunéville came under the domain of Duke Mathieu II of Lorraine, who became the owner of the castle.

The overall plan of the building is known, as it was located on the left bank of the Vezouze, near a bridge, at the site of the current castle. It was a quadrangular building with corner towers, surrounded on three sides by a water-filled moat supplied by the river that flowed along the northern flank.

It is in this fortress that the Dukes of Lorraine stayed throughout the Middle Ages. Some took a particular interest in it and carried out important works, such as Duke Raoul, who founded a castle chapel dedicated to the Virgin Mary and Anthony of Padua in 1343. Additionally, three masses were to be held there every week on Sundays, Wednesdays, and Saturdays.

It had belonged to the Dukes of Lorraine since the thirteenth century. It was rebuilt as “the Versailles of Lorraine” by Duke Léopold from 1703 to 1723, from designs of Pierre Bourdict and Nicolas Dorbay and then of the architect Germain Boffrand, whose masterwork it became. It became the home of the exiled king Stanislaus I of Poland, last duke of Lorraine and Bar.

In the 18th century the dukes of Lorraine had the flow of the Vezouze river channeled into a series of garden follies. An arm of the river flows to the north of the palace along a garden.

Lunéville was listed as a Monument historique in 1901 and by successive ordinances; its princely apartments are looked after by the Ministry of Defence while the structure is the responsibility of the Conseil départemental de Meurthe-et-Moselle.

On the night of 2 to 3 January 2003, a fire broke out that ravaged the château to the extent that the plaster vault of the chapelle royale collapsed. Passing through the attics, the fire destroyed the roof over much of the structure. The restoration of the building and its decors is under way.

== Interior ==
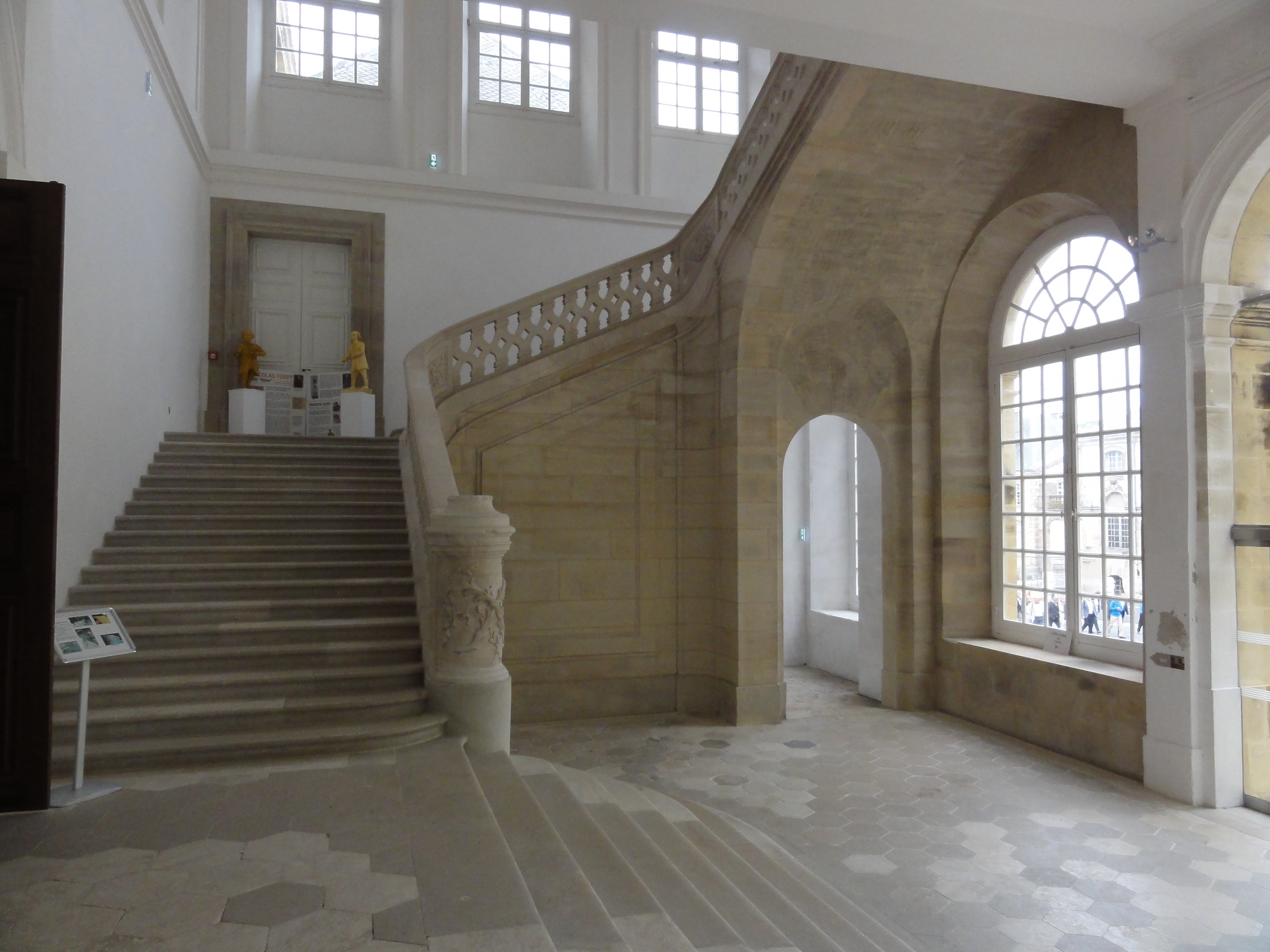
southern staircase

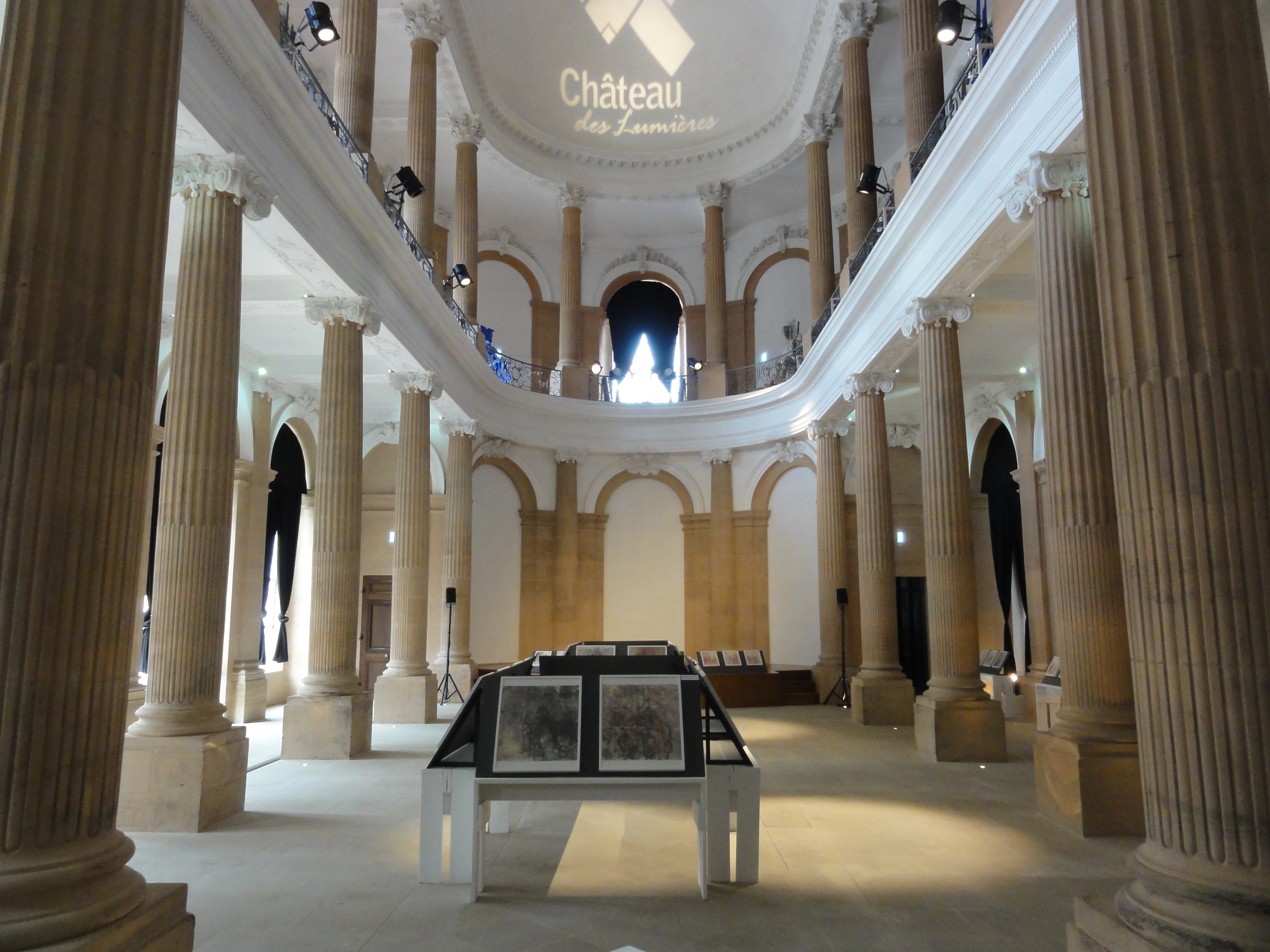
Chapel

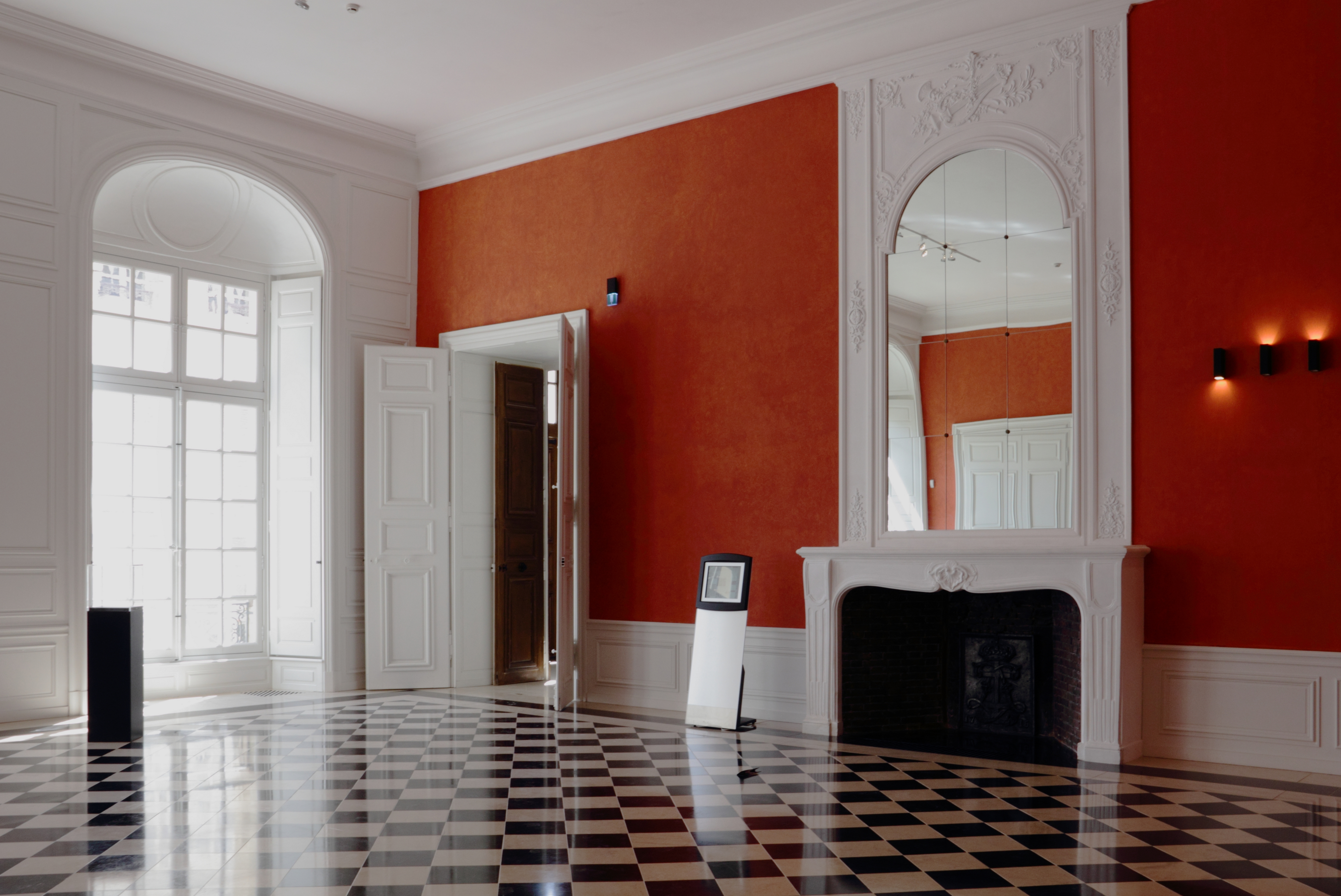
Salle de la Livrée

Since only the southern half of the palace was completed, most of the important state rooms and royal apartments were located on this side towards the garden. The Ground floor plan in 1720 and later during the rule of Stanislaus I in 1753 was largely similar with some differences with the garden front rooms, which received different functions or where the wall were moved. The plan in 1753 was:

- Chapel
- Salle des Gardes
- Salle de la Livrée
- Grande Salle, òu le Roy mange
- Antichambre du Roy
- Chambre de Parade du Roy (former Chambre de Son Altesse Royale Madame – chambre à coucher commune in 1720)
- Cabinet du Conseil (former Grand Cabinet de Son Altesse Royale Madame in 1720)
- Chambre à coucher du Roy (former Chambre de Son Altesse Royale – chambre du lever in 1720)
- Cabinet du Jour
- Petit Appartement du Roy servant de retraite (formerly two rooms: Chambre des Indes and Salle de la machine/salle à manger privée in 1720)
- Garderobe du Roy
- Salle servant d'Antichambre à l'Appartement de la Reine
- Grand Cabinet d'Assemblé
- Chambre de Parade de la Reine (former Grand cabinet de Son Altesse Royale – cabinet du conseil in 1720)
- Degagement
- Petite Cour
- Appartement du Commandant des Gardes du Corp
- Appartement d'une Dame d'honneur de la Reine
- Logement du premier Médecin de la Reine

The parts facing the inner courtyard were:

- Logement du premier Médecin du Roy
- Logement des Etrangers
- Logement de Monsieur le Chancellier

Facing the outer Avant-Cour are two wings, the northern wing connected to the main building and the southern wing detached:

- Appartement d'Etranger (north wing)
- Logement du Grand Ecuryer (north wing)
- Logement d'Etranger (south wing)
- Logement du Grand Chambellan (south wing)

In the main corps de logis two large staircases (l'escalier d'honneur) on the northern and southern side led to the first floor. The first floor consisted of rooms and apartments of court members, such as Duke Franciszek Maksymilian Ossoliński and Duchess Ossoliński, the grand escuyer, grand marshall, ladies-in-waiting, grand almoner, office of the chancellor, chamberlains, etc.

The assignment during the previous rulers was slightly different, but largely the same. In 2014 the departement of Meurthe-et-Moselle commissioned a video of how the bedchamber of the duchess would have looked like during the times of Élisabeth Charlotte d'Orléans (1676–1744).

Little is left of the original interior decoration and arrangements. The state authorities are working on repairing the damaged parts of the great fire of 2003. Acquisitions have been ongoing to bring back lost items such as mirrors, paintings, furniture and other original works of art.

== Structures ==
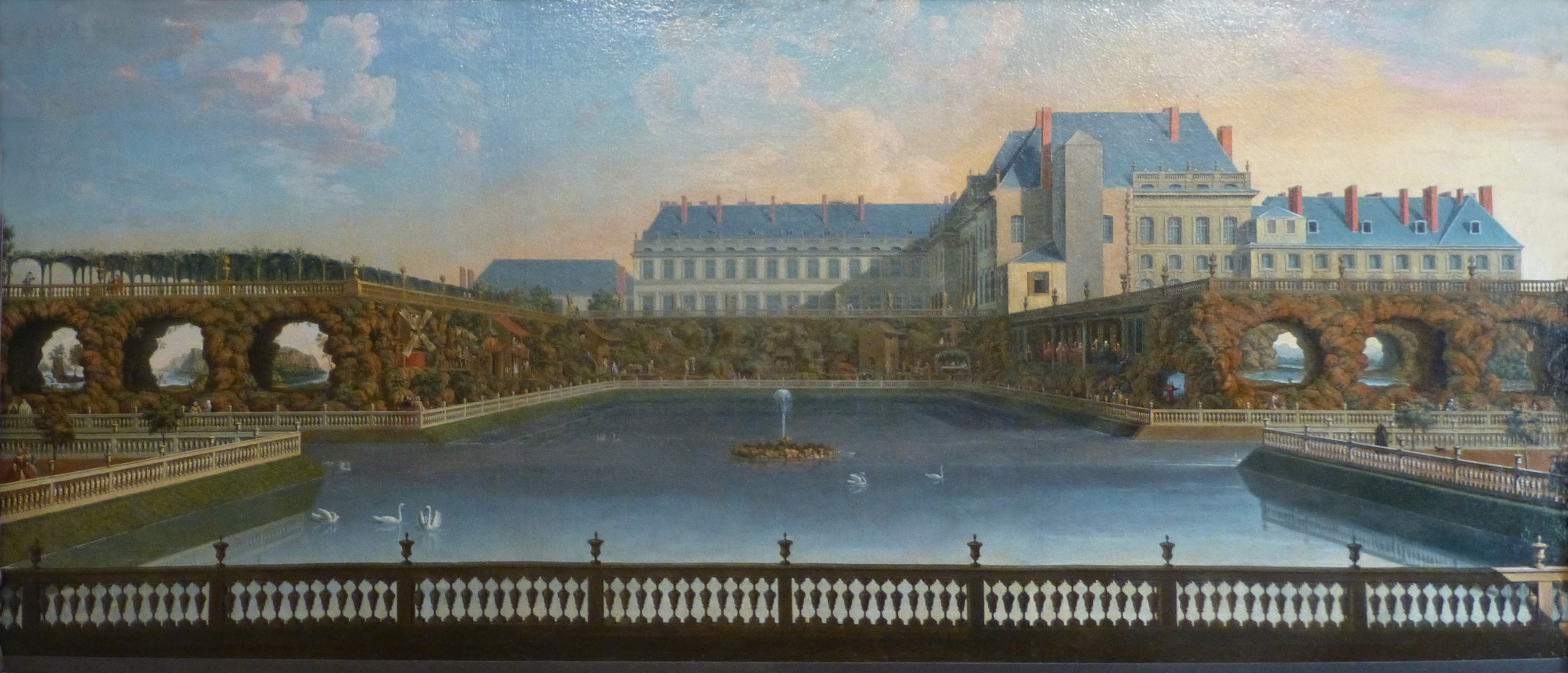
The rocher grotto with moving figures, around 1760. Painting by André Joly

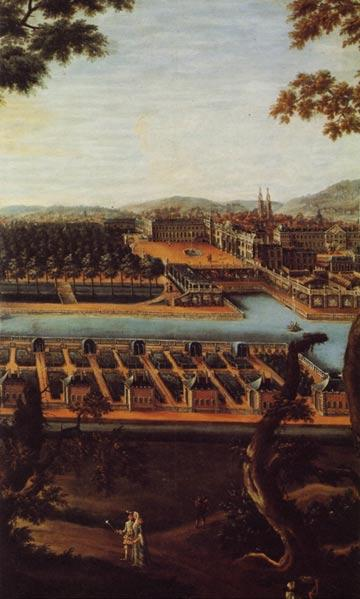
View of chartreuses cottages in the foreground seen from north, with the rocher grotto and palace in the background, painting 18th century

Structures and of the garden included:

- Water cascades
- Grand Canal
- Water bassins
- Hotel de Craon
- Menagery of Monsieur le Duc
- Orangery
- Gendarmery
- Hospital
- Chapel
- Academy
- Barracks

The original water basin figures out of lead were made by Barthélemy Guibal. After the end of Lunéville as a court these statues were acquired by Charles Theodore, Elector of Bavaria in 1766 and installed at Schwetzingen Palace. The figures are the shipwrecked singer Arion with dolphins and putti for a fountain, and wild boar. The figures were lent back to Lunéville for a 2021 special exhibition, where they were 3D scanned to be remade and installed again at their original locations. Schwetzingen und Lunéville are twin towns.

The remaining statues out of stone that are located in the garden include Apollon foulant un dragon, Diane, Flore and La Nuit.

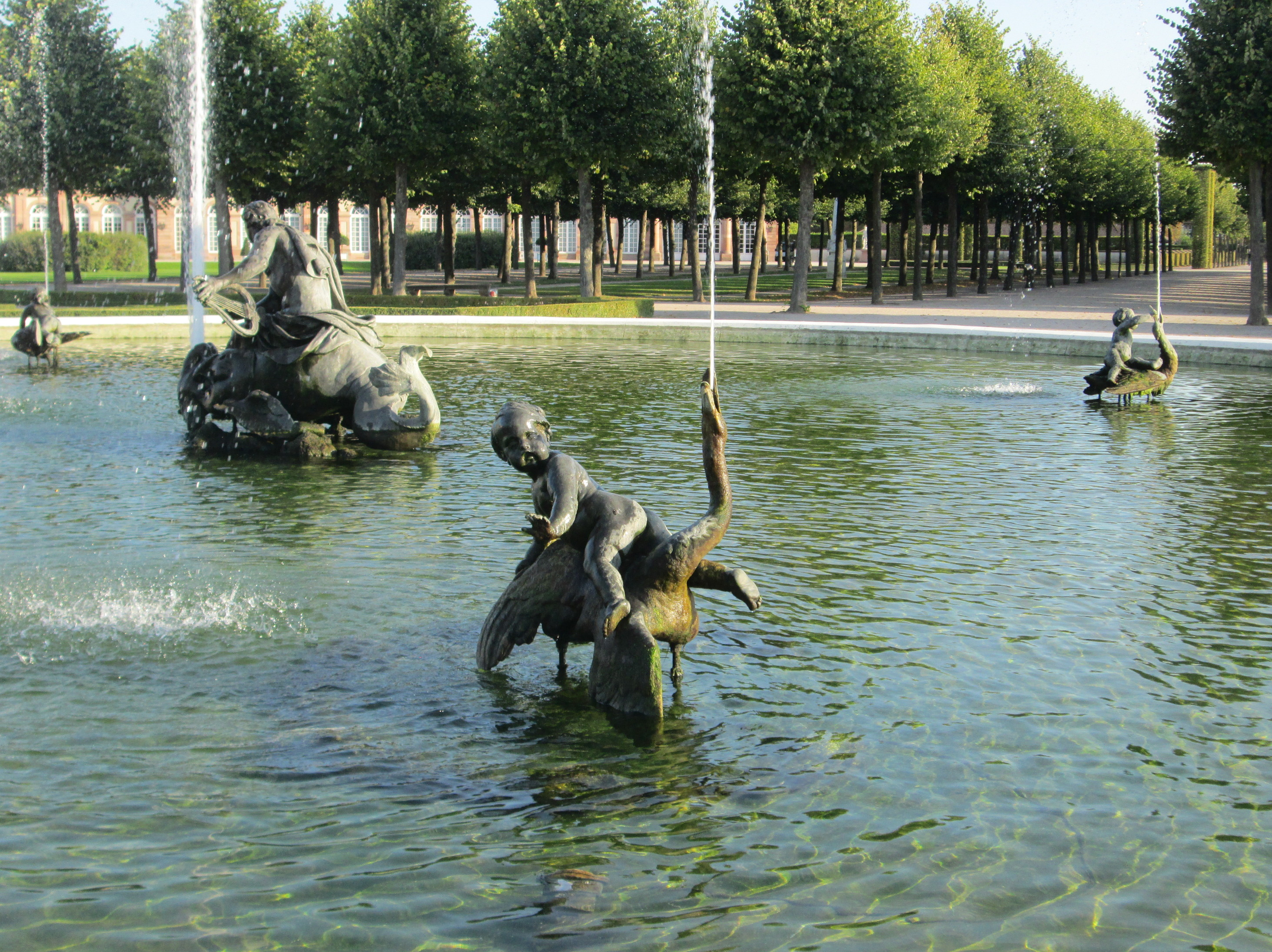
Arion fountain, today at Schwetzingen Palace

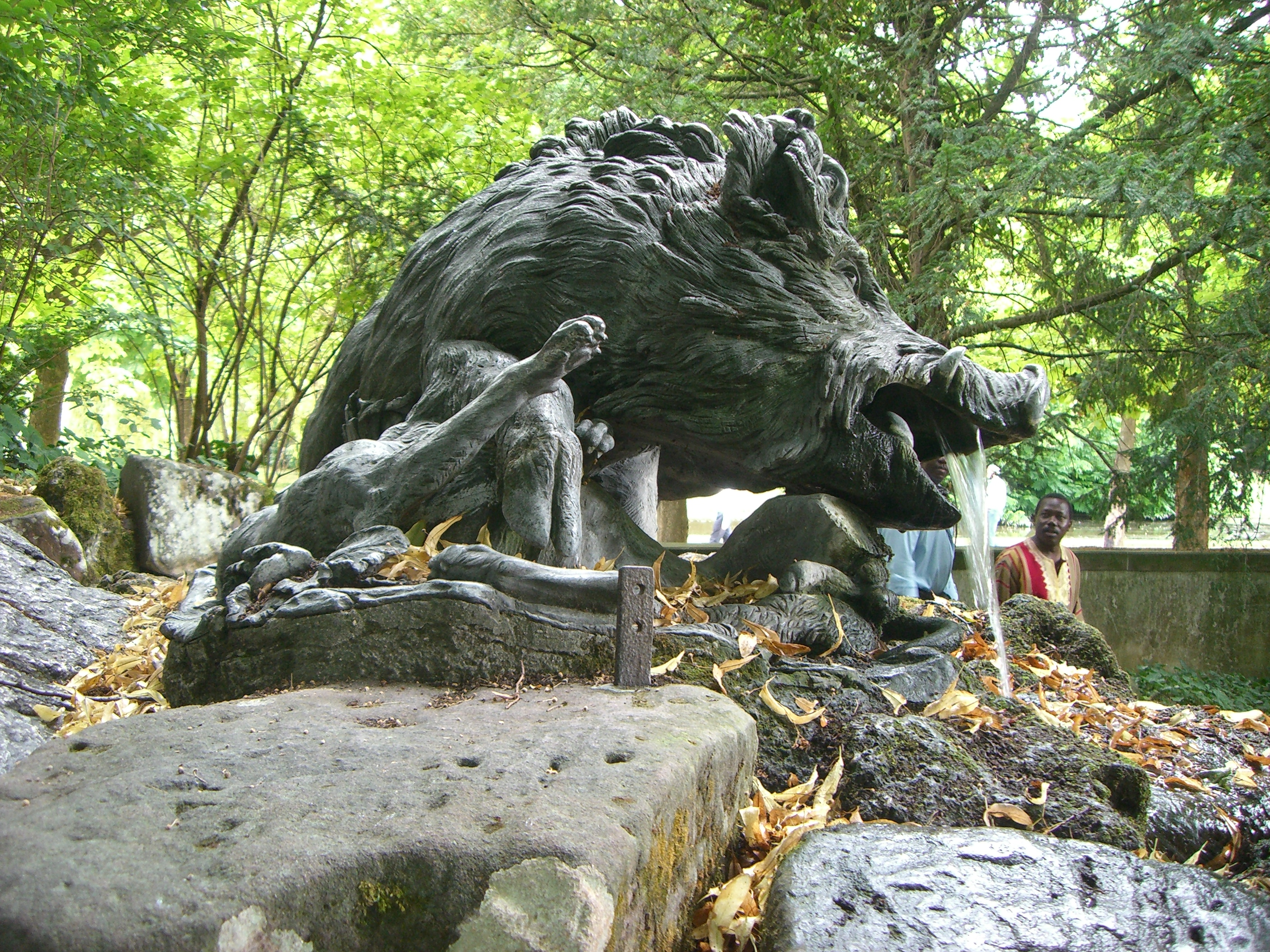
Sculpture of a boar, today at Schwetzingen Palace

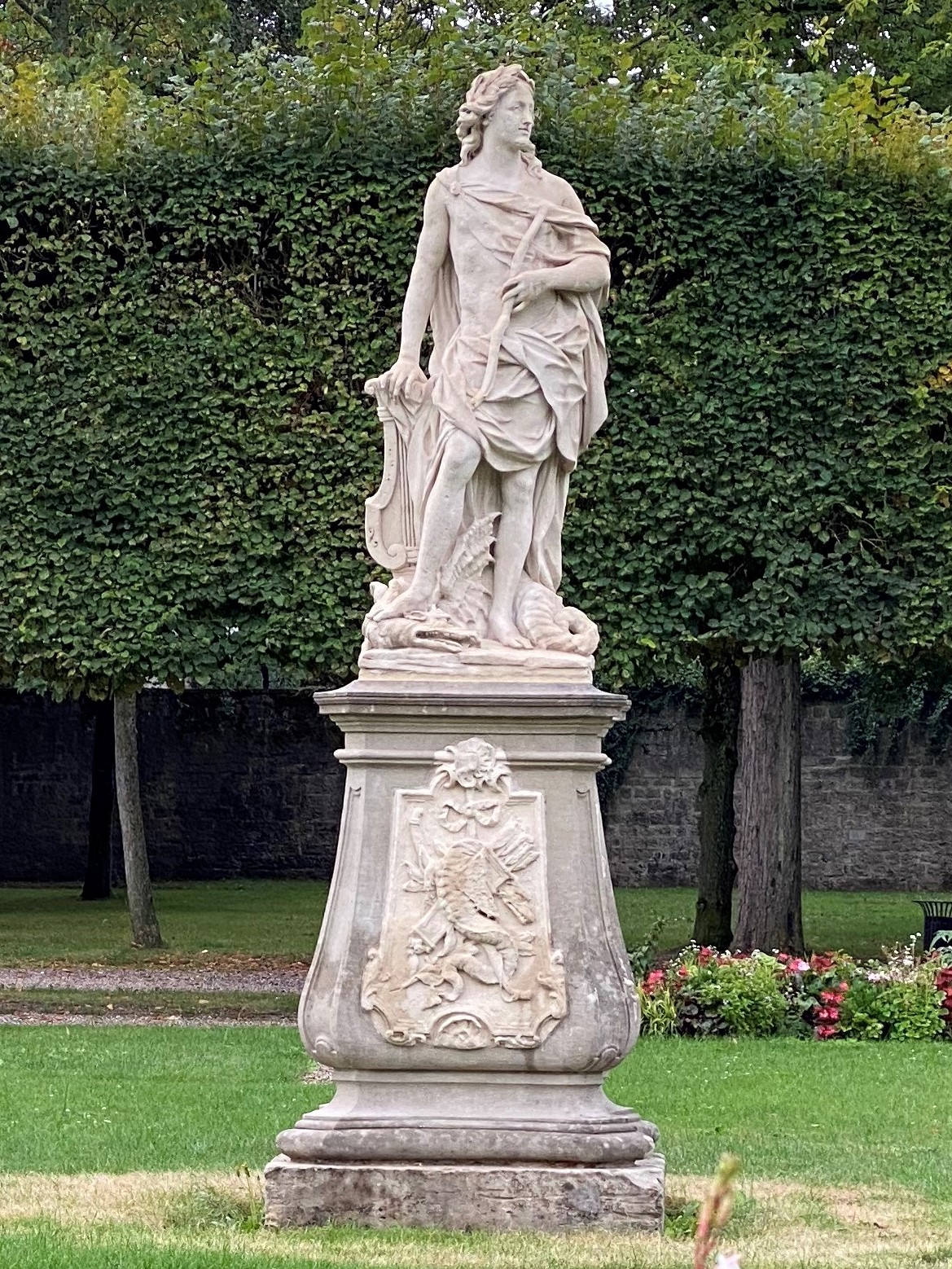
Apollon

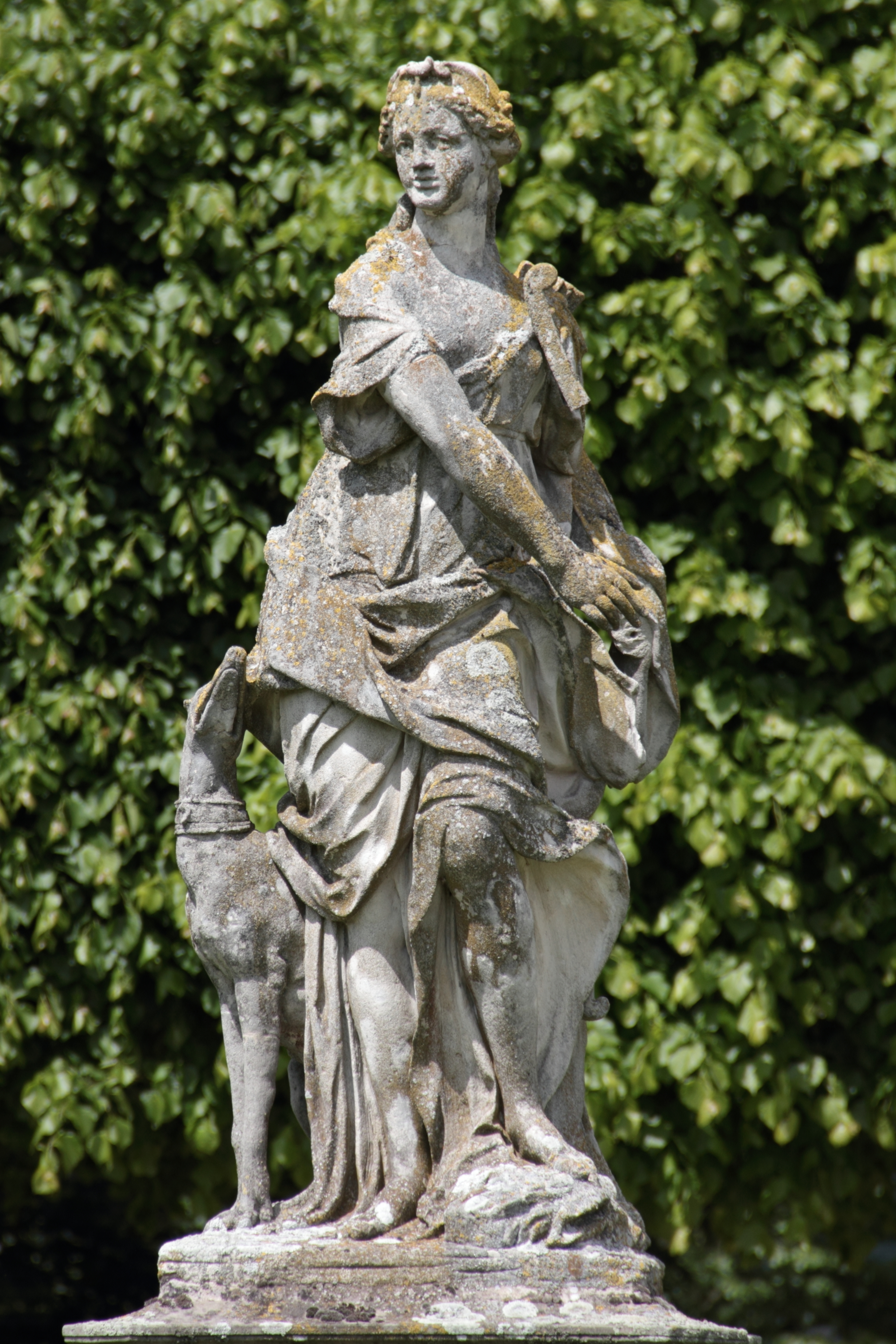
Diane

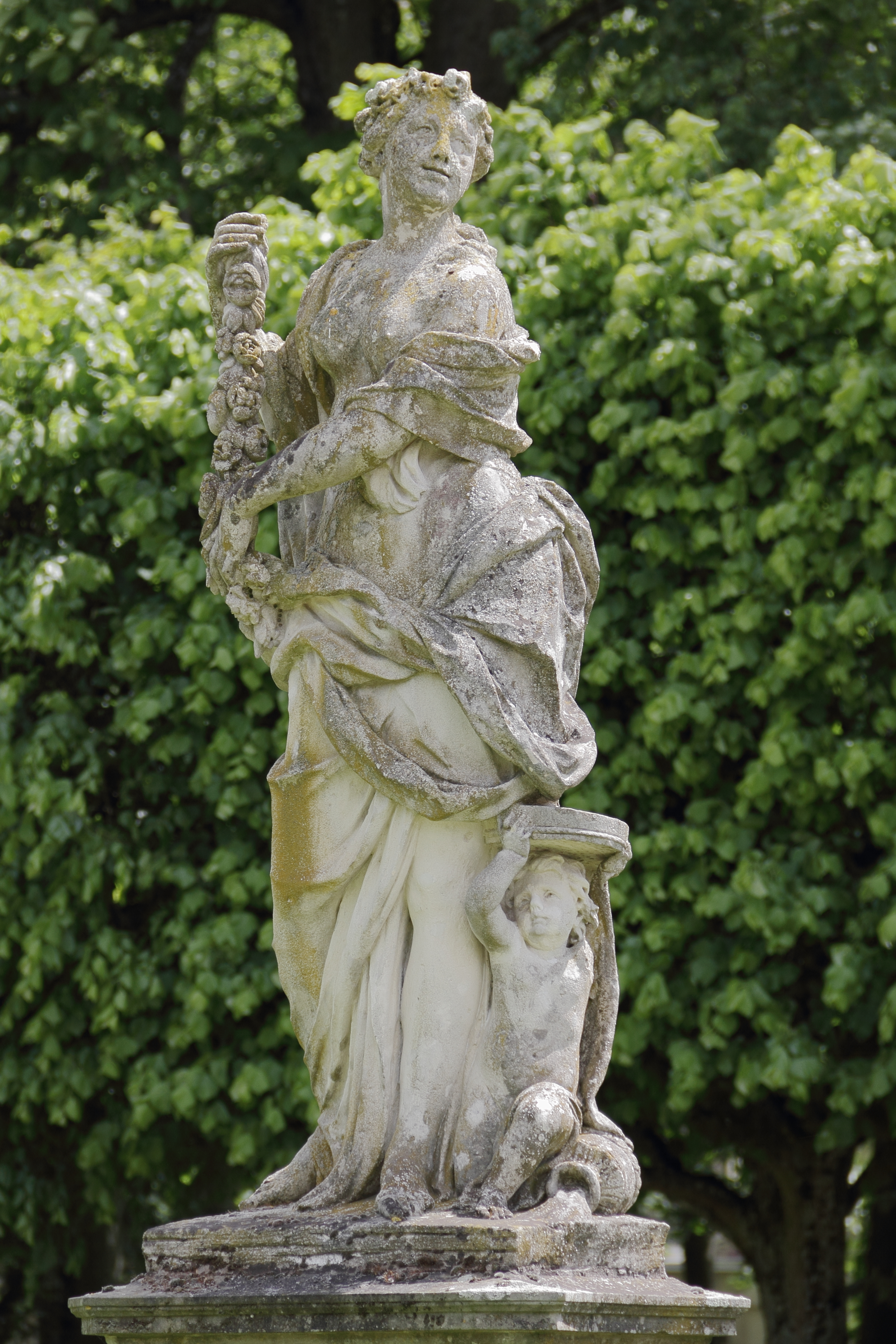
Flore

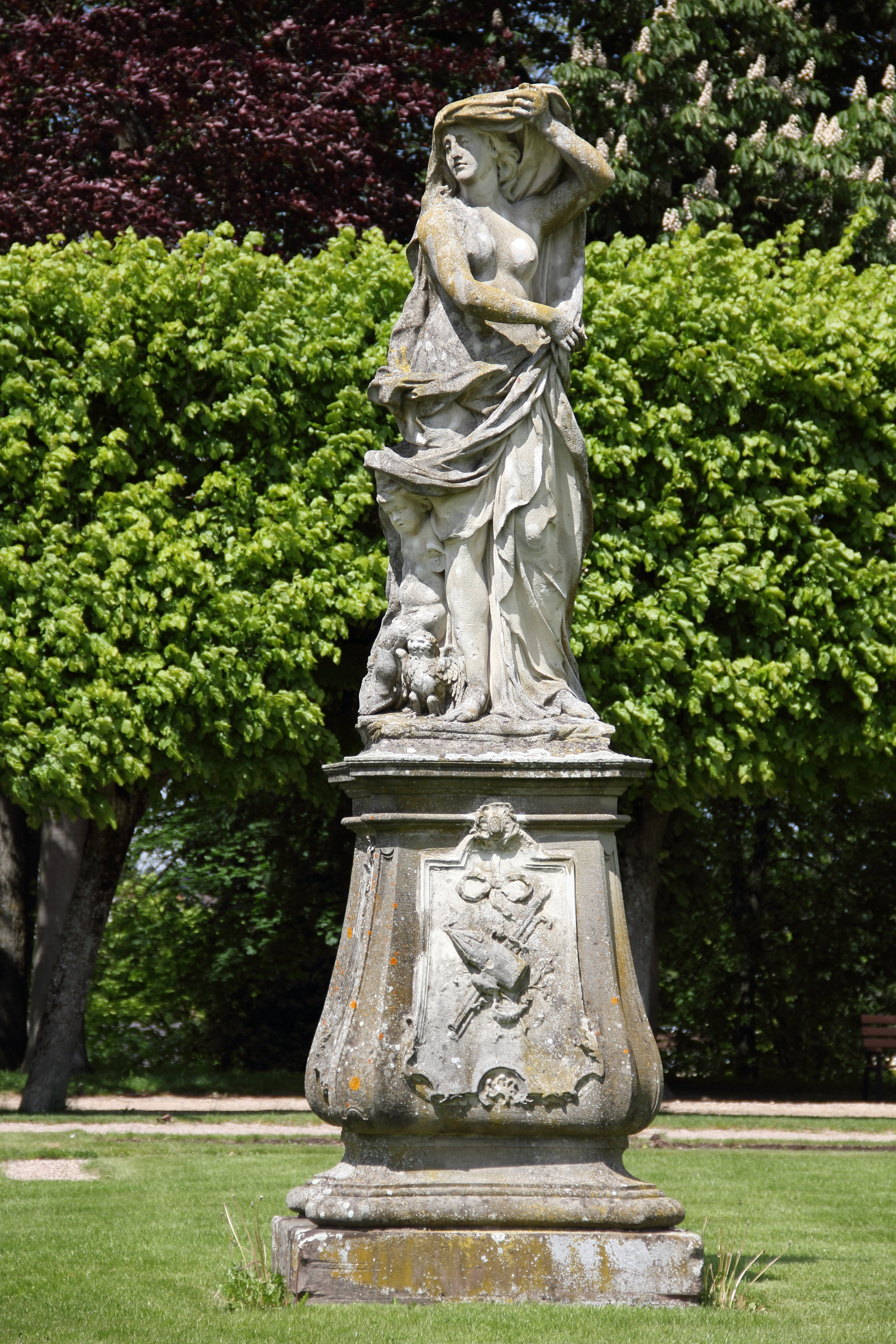
La Nuit

Stanislaus I had a number of structures commissioned, some of which were called folies:

- Salon de la Pêcherie
- Comédie Champêtre
- Pavillon de la Cascade
- Kiosque
- Trèfle
- Grotto with moving figures called the "rock with automatons" (rocher aux automates) next to water bassin

=== Trèfle ===
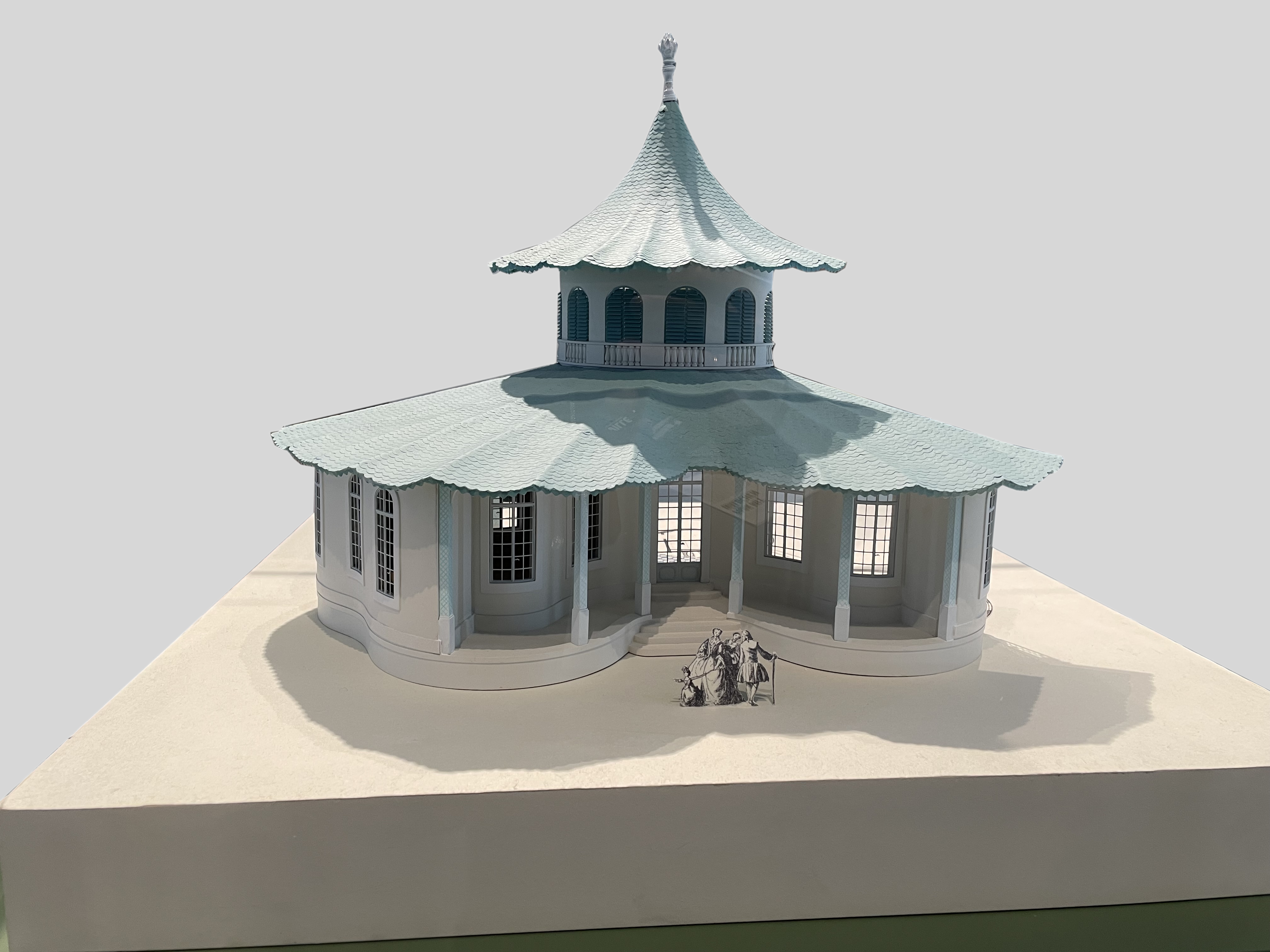
Model of the Trèfle

The pavillon du Trèfle, also known as the maison du Trèfle, was constructed in 1739 by Emmanuel Héré de Corny. Inspired by Chinese pagoda architecture, this Chinoiserie pavilion was entirely made out of wood. It received its name "trèfle", meaning "clover leaf", due to its trefoil-layout. The silhouette of its roof was inspired by Chinese architecture. The building was made out a round salon with about seven metres in diameter, with a tiled floor. It was decorated with painted scenes with Chinese motifs and painted scagliola. It was furnished to be a comfortable place with a sleeping chamber with an alcove, a bathroom and a garde-robes. The upper floor was a belvedere lookout point where you could see the "bas bosquets", also called nouveaux bousquets, created under Stanislaus, in between the river Vezouze and the canal.

The pavilion was probably the inspiration for the Chinese House in Potsdam, completed for Frederick II of Prussia in 1764. The pavillon du Trèfle was lost over time while the one in Potsdam survived.

=== Chartreuses ===
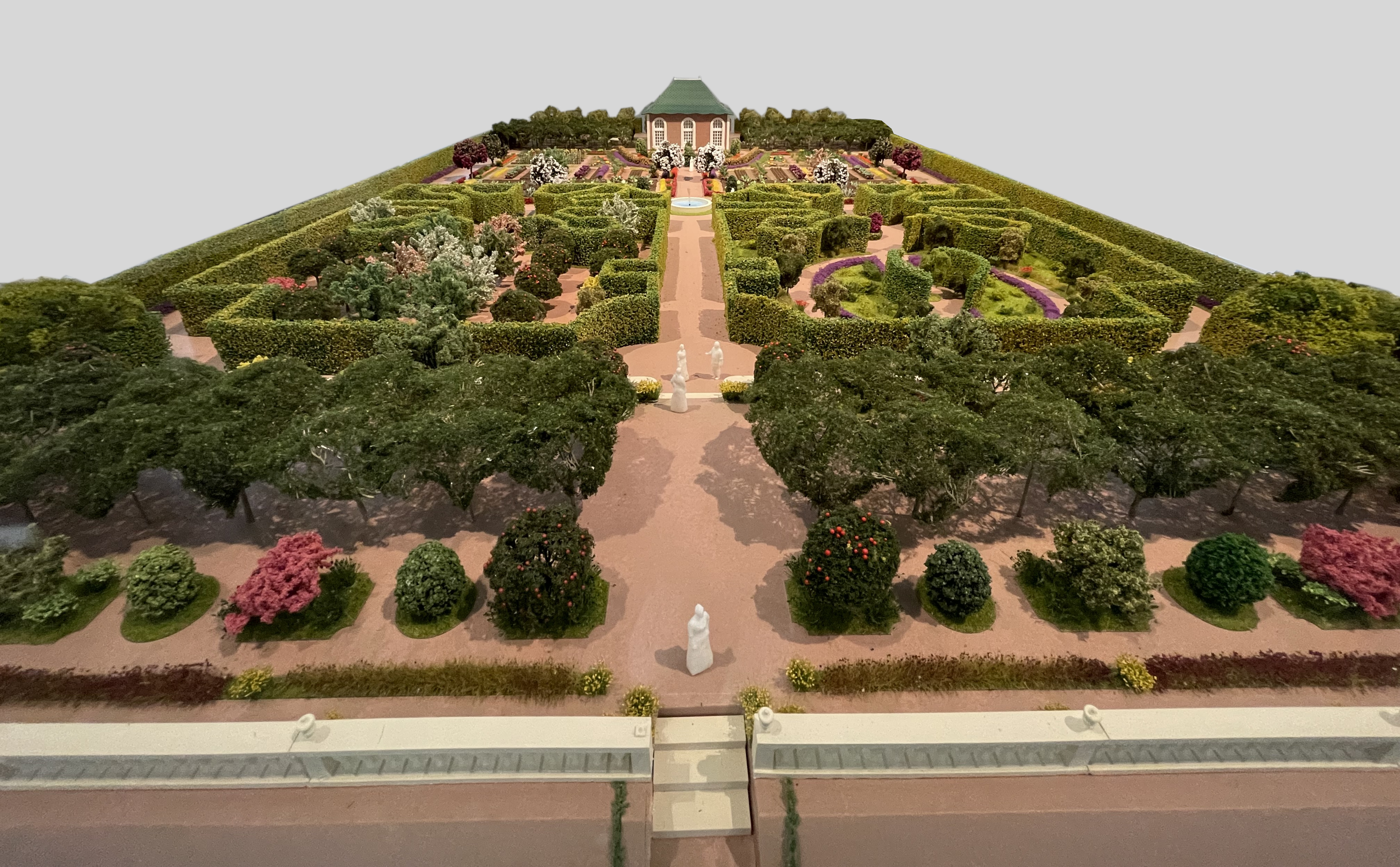
Model of the chartreuse of Madame de Boufflers, as it appeared in 1773

Around 1739-1740 Stanislaus I remodeled the grounds next to the main garden, which was enclosed by both arms of the Vezouze river into an island. The architect Héré completed a series of six cottages called chartreuses. Each one of these cottages were surrounded by gardens, kitchen gardens and hedges. They grew their own fruits and vegetables. The cottages were occupied by the mistress and other court favourites, who grew, harvested and offered their goods to Stanislaus.

The cottages were two storeys high and simple stone and brickwork from the outside, but sophisticated inside. In the chartreuse of Madame de Boufflers, a small vestibule then led to an oval salon, in-between two boudoirs. All around the walls and the ceilings were decorated with painting of flowers and girlands. In this refuge, the nobility was able to hide away from the real world in an idealised community that was in harmony with nature. Even though this simplicity was only an appearance, similar settings such as the hameau and English gardens of the Hameau de Chantilly, Madame Pompadour's Château de Bellevue, and the Hameau de la Reine of Marie Antoinette in Versailles exist.

Of these chartreuses in Lunéville only one still exists in ruins.

== See also ==
- Château de Commercy
- Château d'Einville-au-Jard
- Château de la Favorite (Lunéville)
- Château de la Malgrange
- Palace of the Dukes of Lorraine
- List of Baroque residences
