= Szymon Czechowicz =

Polish artist (1689–1775)

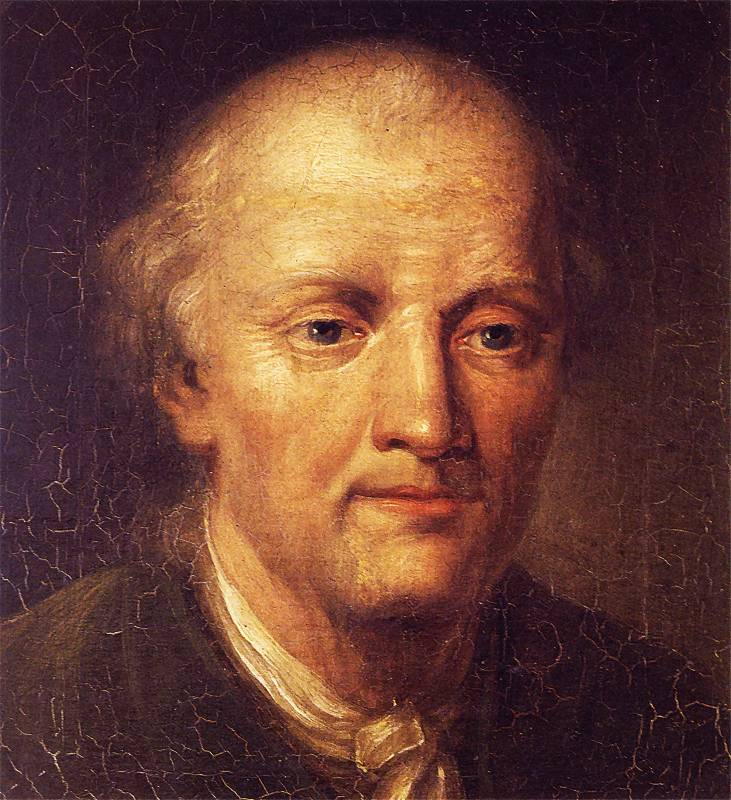
- Self portrait, 1775.
- Born: before 22 July 1689; Kraków
- Died: 21 July 1775; Warsaw
- Known for: Painting
- Movement: Baroque
- Patrons: Franciszek Maksymilian Ossoliński

Szymon Czechowicz (July 1689 – 21 July 1775) was a prominent Polish painter of the Baroque, considered one of the most accomplished painters of 18th century sacral painting in Poland. He specialized in sublime effigies of painted figures. His establishment of a school of painting gives him a great influence on Polish art.

== Life and professional career ==
Initially trained by the court painter of Franciszek Maksymilian Ossoliński, in 1711 he went to Rome, where was admitted to Accademia di San Luca. His tutor was Benedetto Luti. During his apprenticeship in Rome he practiced copying works of famous artists, such as Raphael (designs of tapestries), Guido Reni (Crucifixion, today in the St. Stanisław's Church in Rome; Massacre of the Innocents, Lviv Gallery of Art), Peter Paul Rubens (Christ among the Pharisees), Federico Barocci (Deposition, Lviv Gallery of Art). In 1716 he was awarded by the Accademia for two of his drawings, Samson vanquishing the lion and Victorious return from the expedition. While still in Rome he painted some altar paintings for churches in Poland – Vision of St. Anthony, The Descent from the Cross, Protection of the Mother of God over Kraków for the Piarists Church in Kraków (1729), and Assumption of the Virgin Mary for the Cathedral in Kielce (1730).

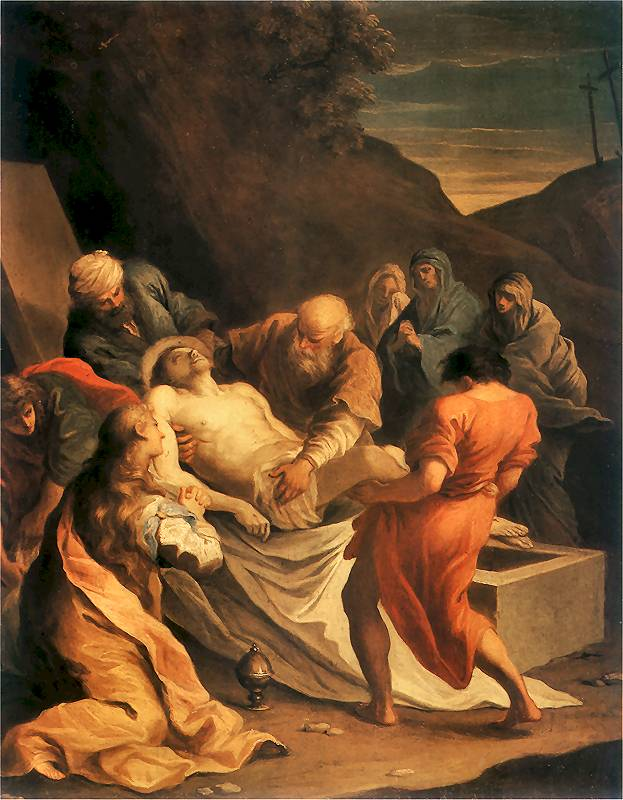
The Entombment, before 1731

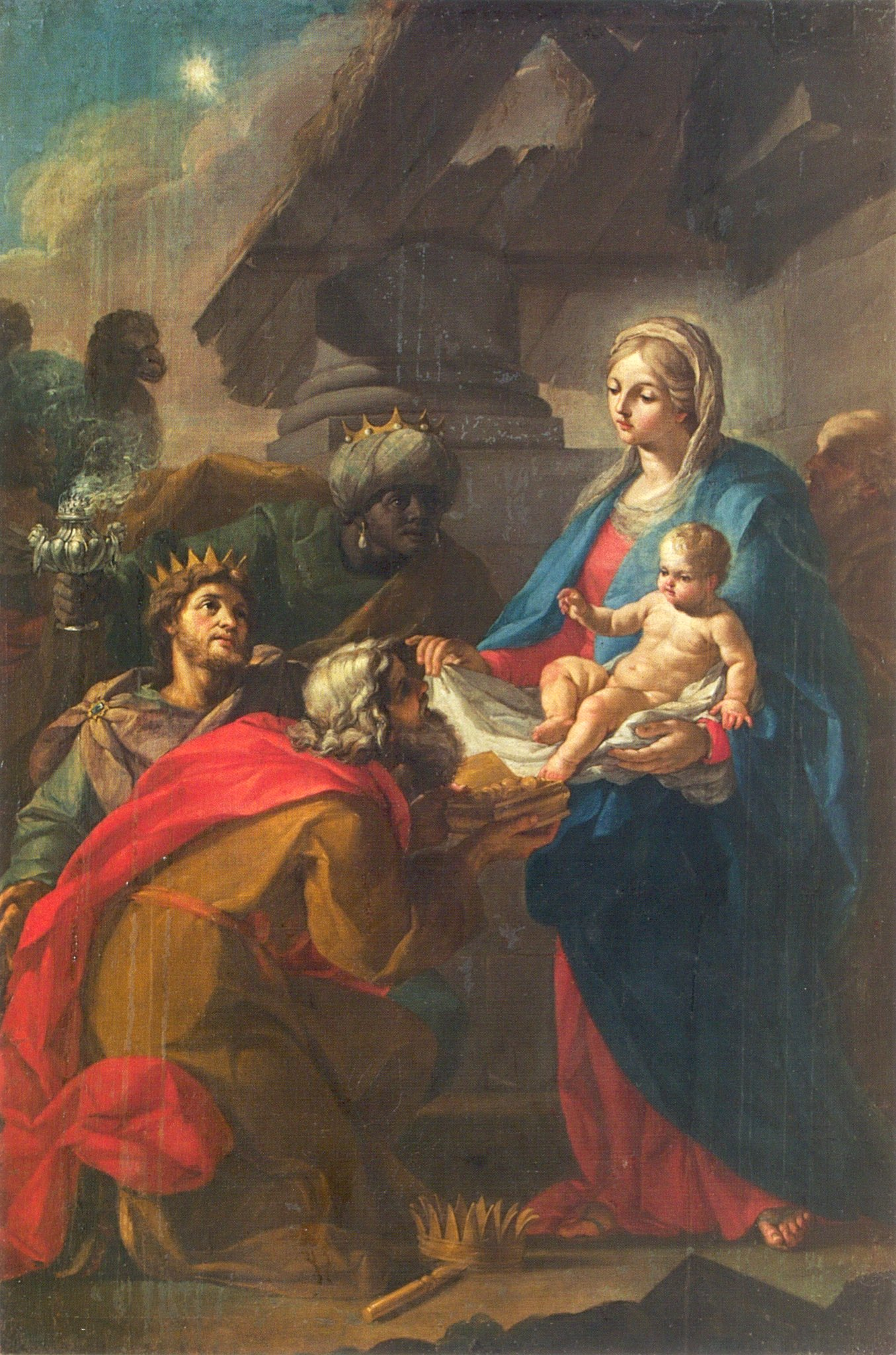
Adoration of the Magi

In 1731 he went back to Poland, where in Warsaw he competed with Johann Samuel Mock to get the position of court painter of Augustus II the Strong. Shortly afterward he became a renowned portrait and religious painter. Among his clients were Polish and Lithuanian magnates and powerful clergymen – Franciszek Maksymilian Ossoliński, Grand Treasurer of the Crown (between 1731–34 he painted his portrait, today in the Armoury of the Castle in Liw), Jan Aleksander Lipski, Bishop of Kraków, Jan Fryderyk Sapieha, Grand Chancellor of Lithuania (in about 1740 he painted his portrait, today in the Lithuanian Art Museum in Vilnius, and at his initiative some religious paintings for St. Anne's Church and SS. Peter and Paul's Church in Kraków in 1741), Jan Tarło, voivode of Sandomierz (after 1743 paintings intended for parish church in Opole Lubelskie), Sułkowski family (paintings for the City Church in Leszno), Jan Klemens Branicki, Grand Crown Hetman (in 1750 he made 7 paintings for the parish church in Tykocin, and in 1760 two more for parish church in Tyczyn), Wacław Rzewuski, Grand Crown Hetman (between 1762–67 paintings for the castle chapel in Pidhirtsi). In his portraits he was influenced by the Sarmatian portrait, though he put emphasis on the psychology of his subject. He worked in Warsaw, Kraków, Poznań, Pidhirtsi, Polotsk and Vilnius. From about 1750, he used delicate colours closely related with rococo. Czechowicz established his own school of painting, where he taught free of charge. Some of his paintings were probably accomplished by his pupils – Franciszek Smuglewicz, Tadeusz Konicz, Jan Ścisło, Jan Bogumił Plersch and Antoni Albertrandi. In his religious paintings he followed the patterns of the mature Roman Baroque, especially Carlo Maratta, Benedetto Luti and Sebastiano Conca, while his portraits were inspired by Saxon school of portrait. Czechowicz died in 1775 in Warsaw and was buried in the Capucine Church.

== Gallery ==
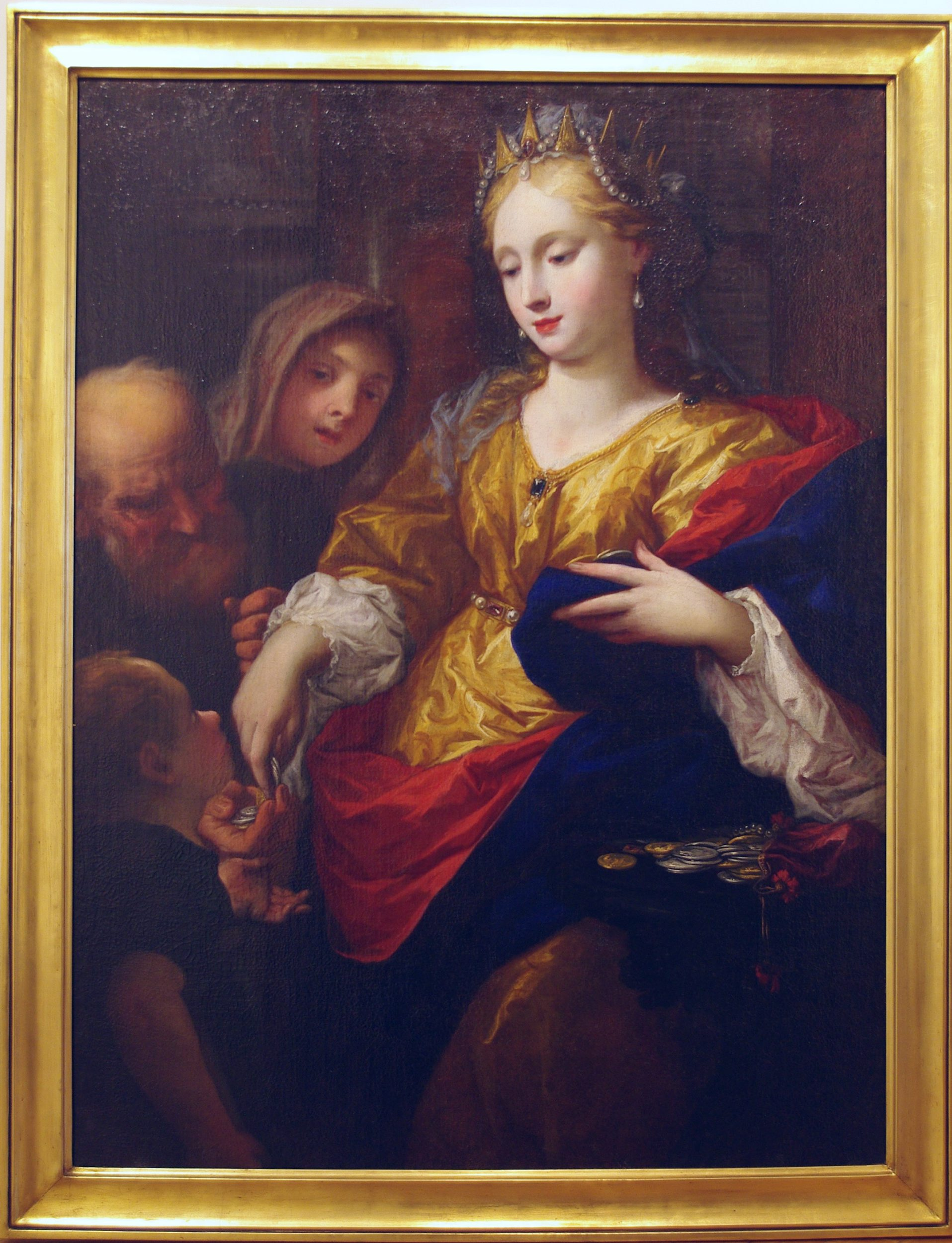
Saint Elizabeth of Hungary

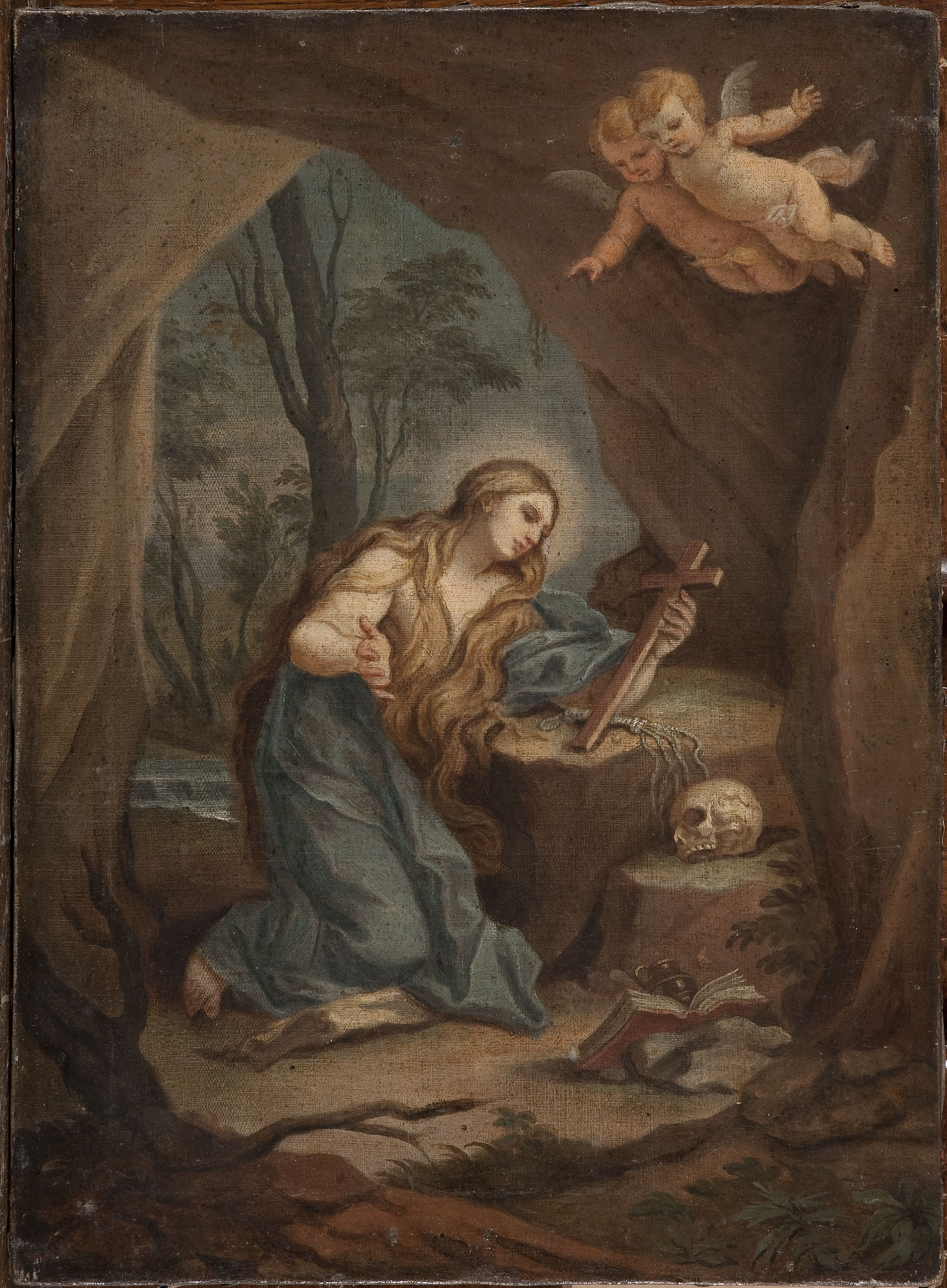
The Penitent Magdalene

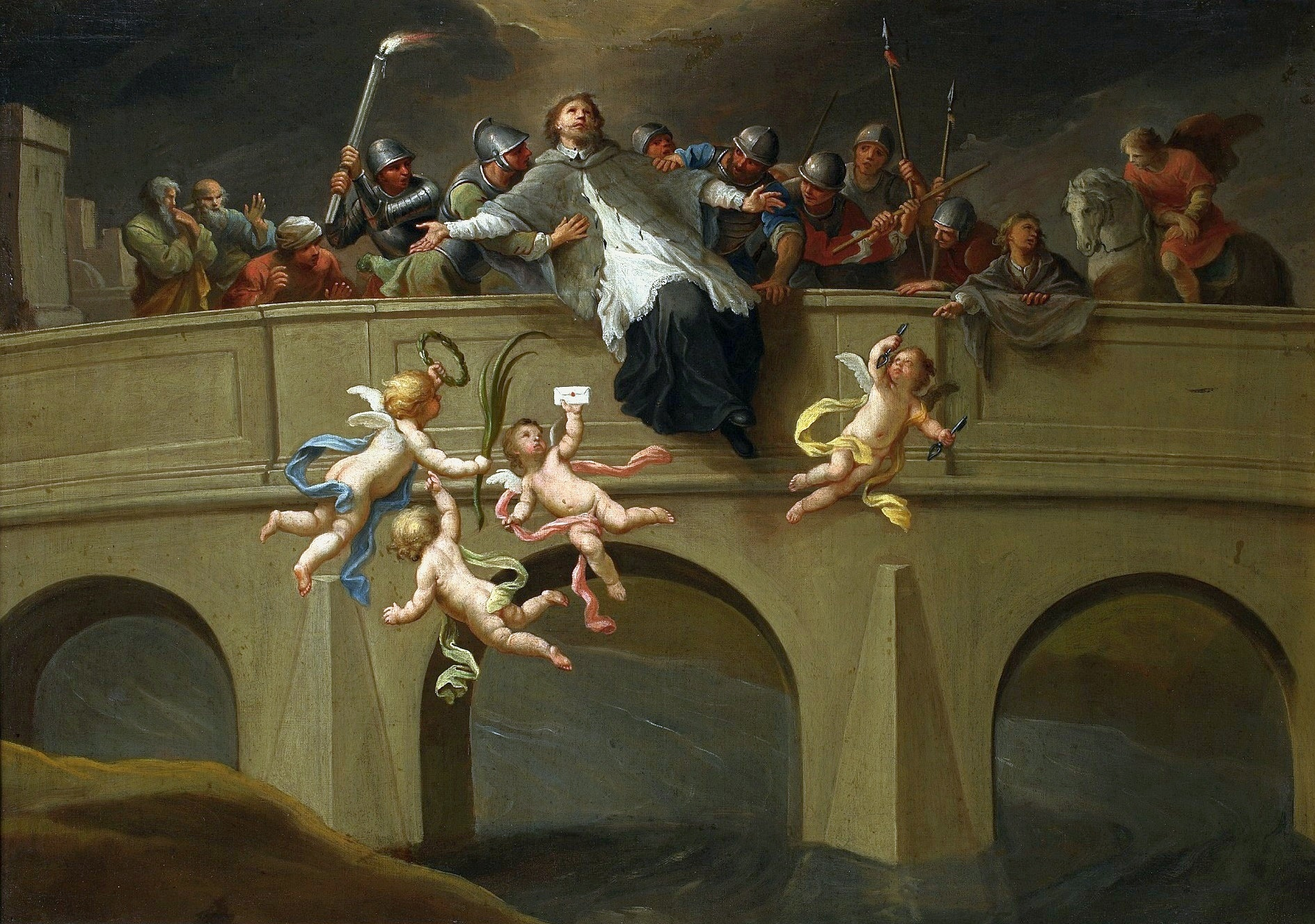
Martyrdom of Saint John Nepomuk

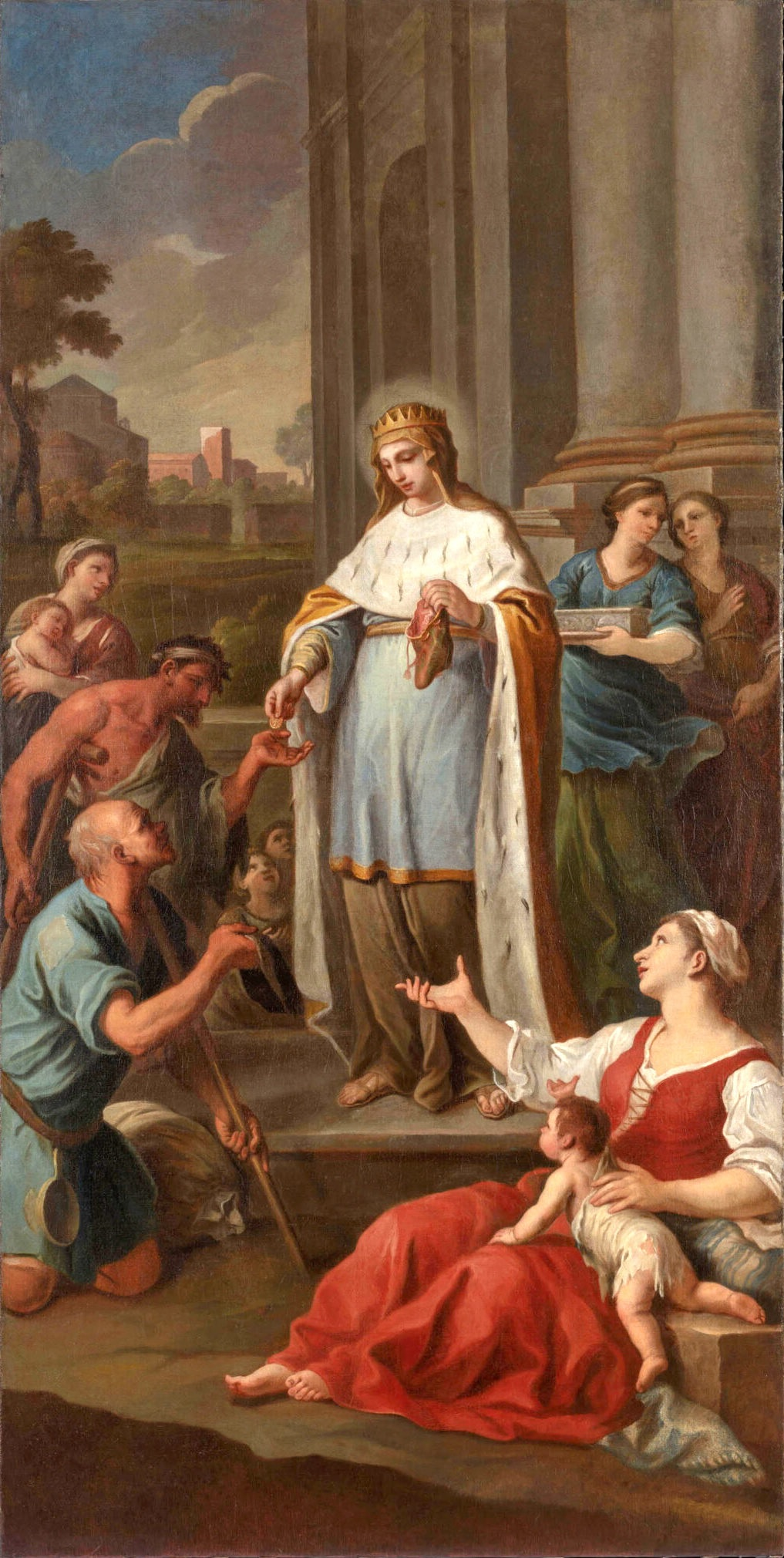
Saint Elizabeth of Portugal, 1750

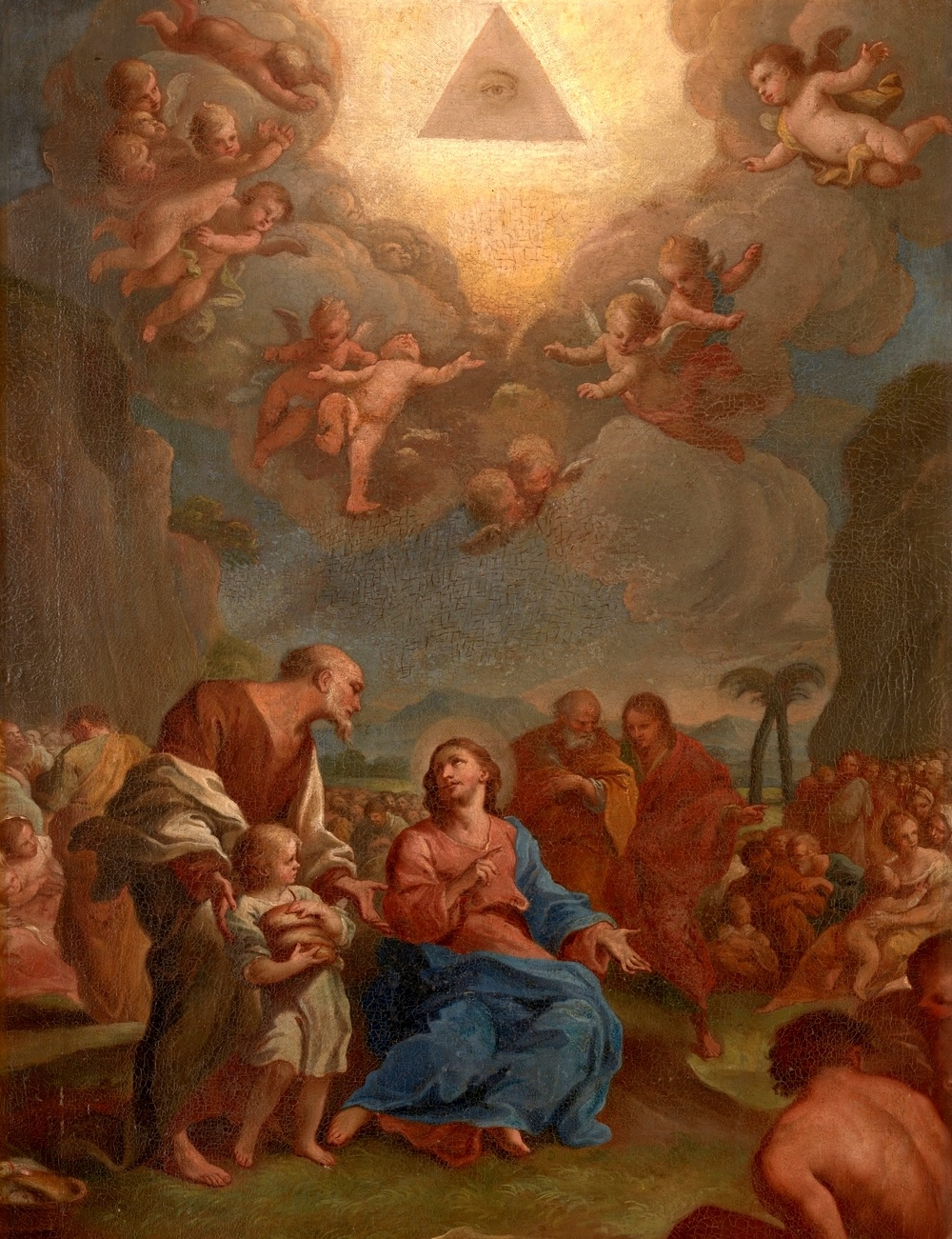
The miraculous multiplication of bread

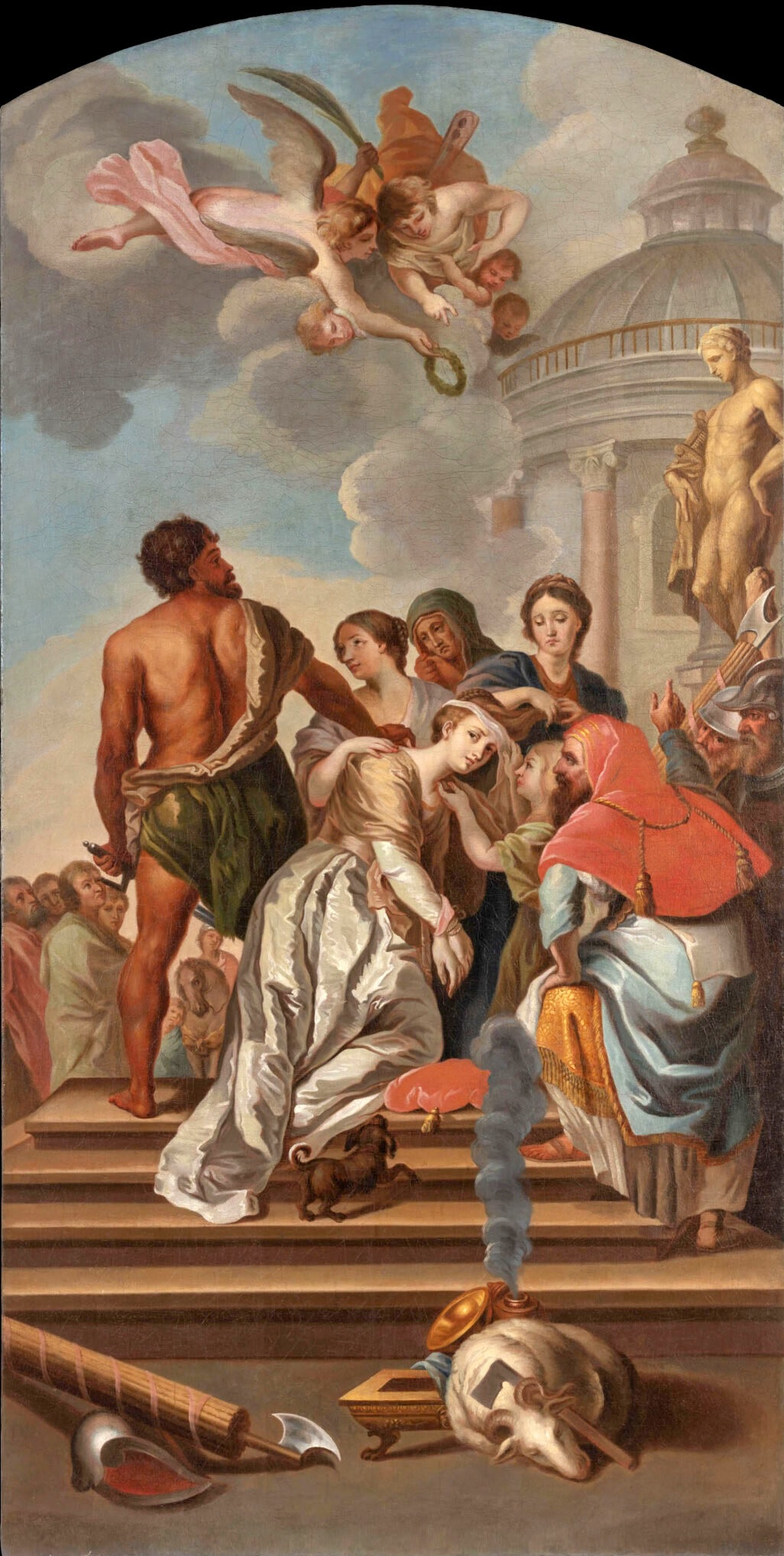
Saint Catherine of Alexandria, 1749

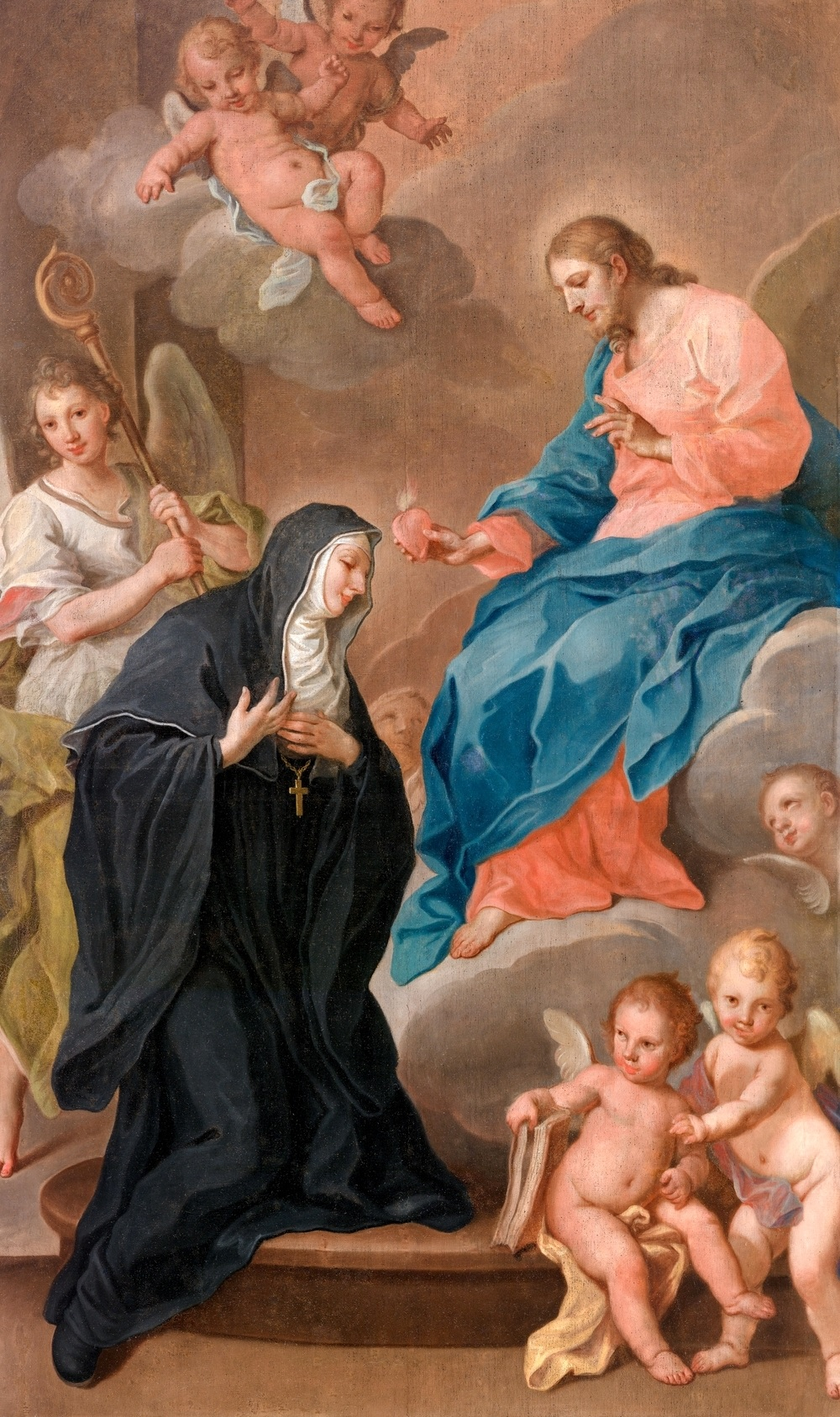
Saint Gertrude of Helfta

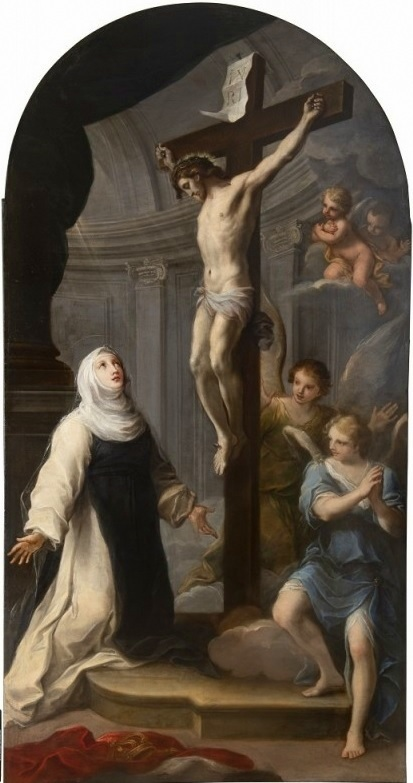
Saint Hedwig of Silesia
