= Einville-au-Jard =

- Commune
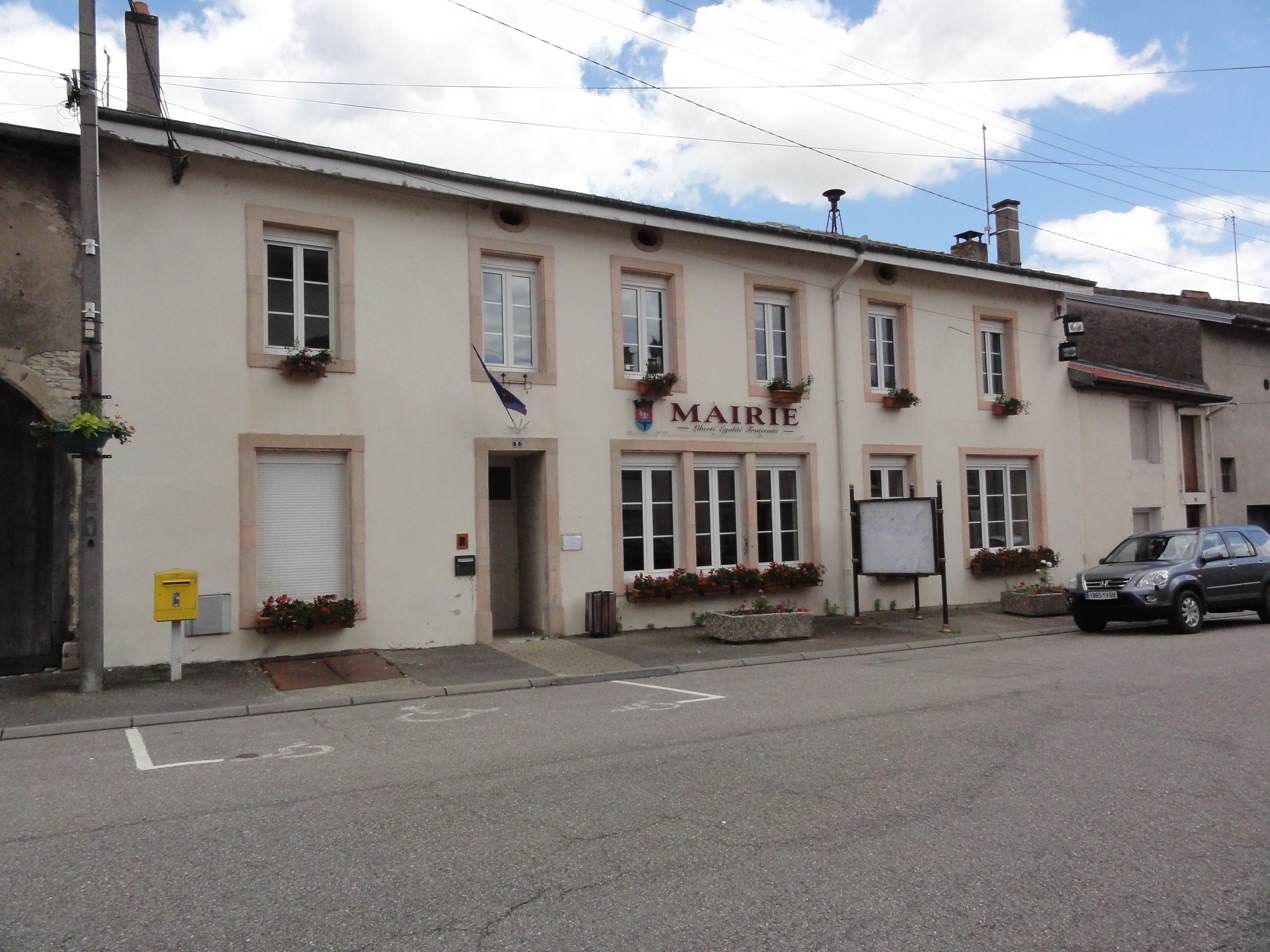
- The town hall in Einville-au-Jard

- Coat of arms
- Location of Einville-au-Jard
- Location within France Location within Grand Est
- Coordinates: 48°39′21″N 6°29′16″E
- Country: France
- Region: Grand Est
- Department: Meurthe-et-Moselle
- Arrondissement: Lunéville
- Canton: Lunéville-1
- Intercommunality: CC du Pays du Sânon

Government
  - Mayor (2020–2026): Marc Villeman
- Area^{1}: 16.98 km^{2} (6.56 sq mi)
- Elevation: 225 m (738 ft)
- Highest elevation: 324 m (1,063 ft)
- Lowest elevation: 216 m (709 ft)
- Population (2023): 1,053
  - Density: 62.01/km^{2} (160.6/sq mi)
- Time zone: UTC+01:00 (CET)
  - Summer (DST): UTC+02:00 (CEST)
- INSEE/Postal code: 54176 /54370
- ^{1} French Land Register data, which excludes lakes, ponds, glaciers > 1 km^{2} (0.386 sq mi or 247 acres) and river estuaries.

Einville-au-Jard (French pronunciation: [ɛ̃vil o ʒaʁ]) is a commune in the Meurthe-et-Moselle department in north-eastern France.

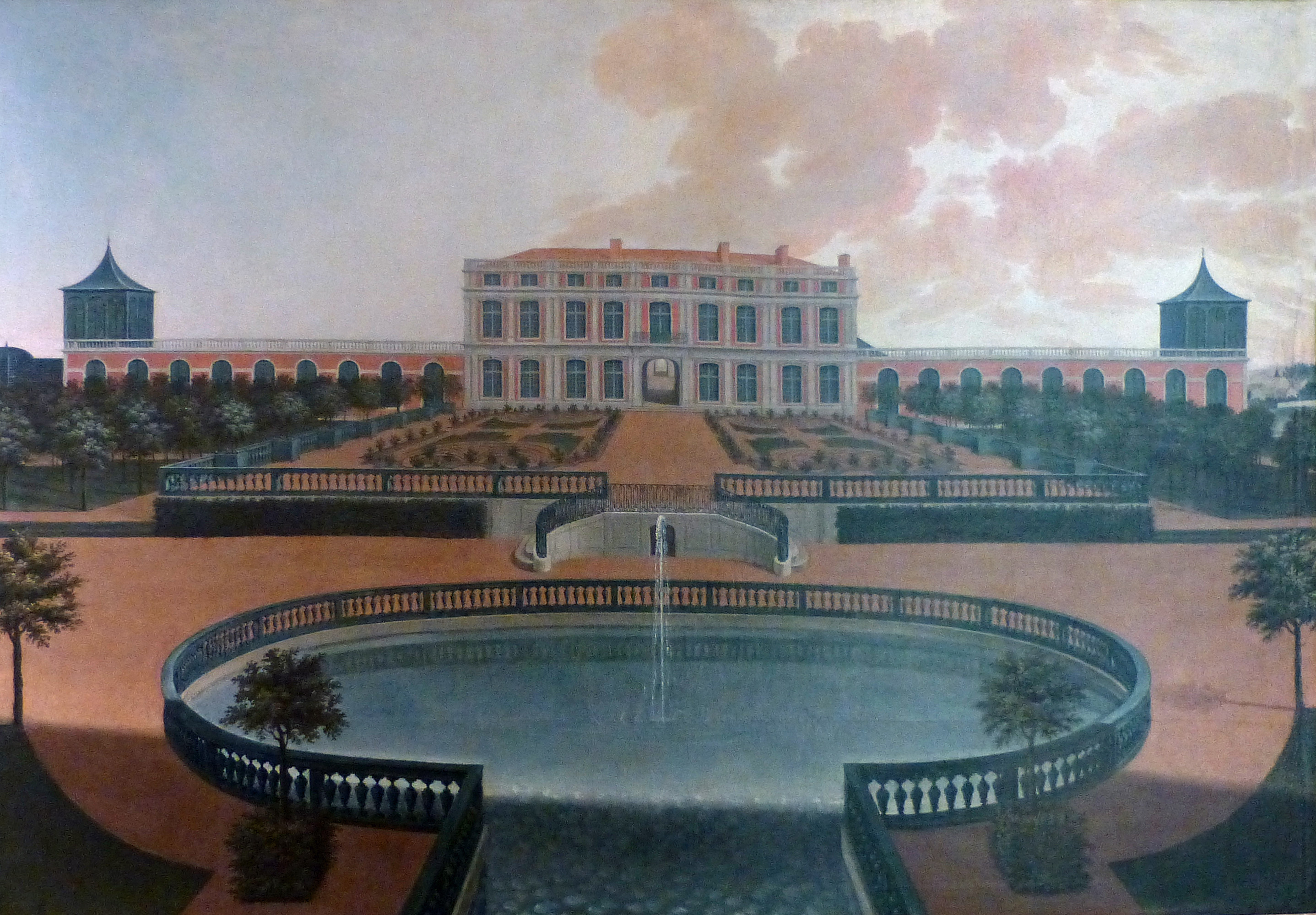
View of the Château d'Einville-au-Jard, painting after André Joly, 18th century

The Château d'Einville-au-Jard was a ducal residence of the House of Lorraine located here.

== See also ==
- Communes of the Meurthe-et-Moselle department
