= Franciszek Maksymilian Ossoliński =

Polish nobleman (1676–1756)

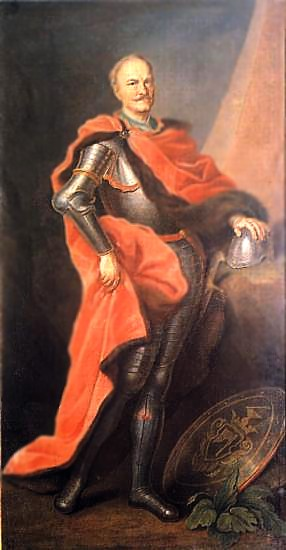
- Coat of arms: Topór
- Born: 2 April 1676 unknown
- Died: 1 July 1756 (aged 80); Jarville-la-Malgrange, Lorraine
- Noble family: Ossoliński
- Spouses: Katarzyna Miączyńska; Katarzyna Jabłonowska
- Issue: Józef Kanty Ossoliński; Anna Ossolińska; Tomasz Ossoliński
- Father: Maksymilian Ossoliński
- Mother: Teodora Krassowska

Count Franciszek Maksymilian Ossoliński (2 April 1676 – 1 July 1756) was a Polish nobleman, politician, diplomat and a patron of arts.

== Biography ==
Son of Łowczy and Chorąży Maksymilian Ossoliński and Teodora Krassowska. He was married in 1706 to Katarzyna Miączyńska and in 1732, in Lwów, married Katarzyna Jabłonowska, the daughter of Grand Chancellor Stanisław Jan Jabłonowski.

He was Chorąży of Drohiczyn from 1703 to 1710, Court Treasurer in 1713, Grand Treasurer of the Crown from 1729 to 1736, Wielkorządca ('governor') of Kraków, Żupnik (salt-pit manager) of salt-pits in Bochnia and Wieliczka in 1727. He was starost (a crown district administrator) of Sandomierz, Nur, Ostrów, Drohiczyn, Chmielnik and Niepołomice.

His political and military career began at the end of the 17th century under patronage of Stanisław Antoni Szczuka. He was private secretary to Augustus II and one of his closest co-workers. He was a strong supporter of giving more power to the King. His policy as Grand Treasurer, induced an increase in income from customs duties.

He was a frequent deputy to the Sejm from 1718. As Sejm Marshal of the ordinary Sejm in Warsaw, from 5 May to 16 November 1722, he warned that broken sessions of the Sejm could lead to the downfall and the end of the Polish–Lithuanian Commonwealth.

In 1733 he signed the election of Stanisław I as King of Poland and commanded armed forces in the defence of the monarch. After the capitulation of Gdańsk in 1734 he was captured by the Russian army.

He refused to submit to King Augustus III and after 1736 he stayed at the court of Stanisław I Leszczyński in the Palace of Lunéville in Lorraine. He died at the Château de la Malgrange.

== Awards ==
- Knight of the Order of the White Eagle, awarded in 1709
- Knight of the Order of the Holy Spirit, awarded in 1737
- Knight of the Order of Saint Michael, awarded in 1737

== Children ==
- Józef became a Chorąży and voivode
- Anna married Józefat Szaniawski
- Tomasz became a canon, Łowczy, Cześnik and Miecznik
