= Château d'Einville-au-Jard =

Partially demolished château in Lorraine, France

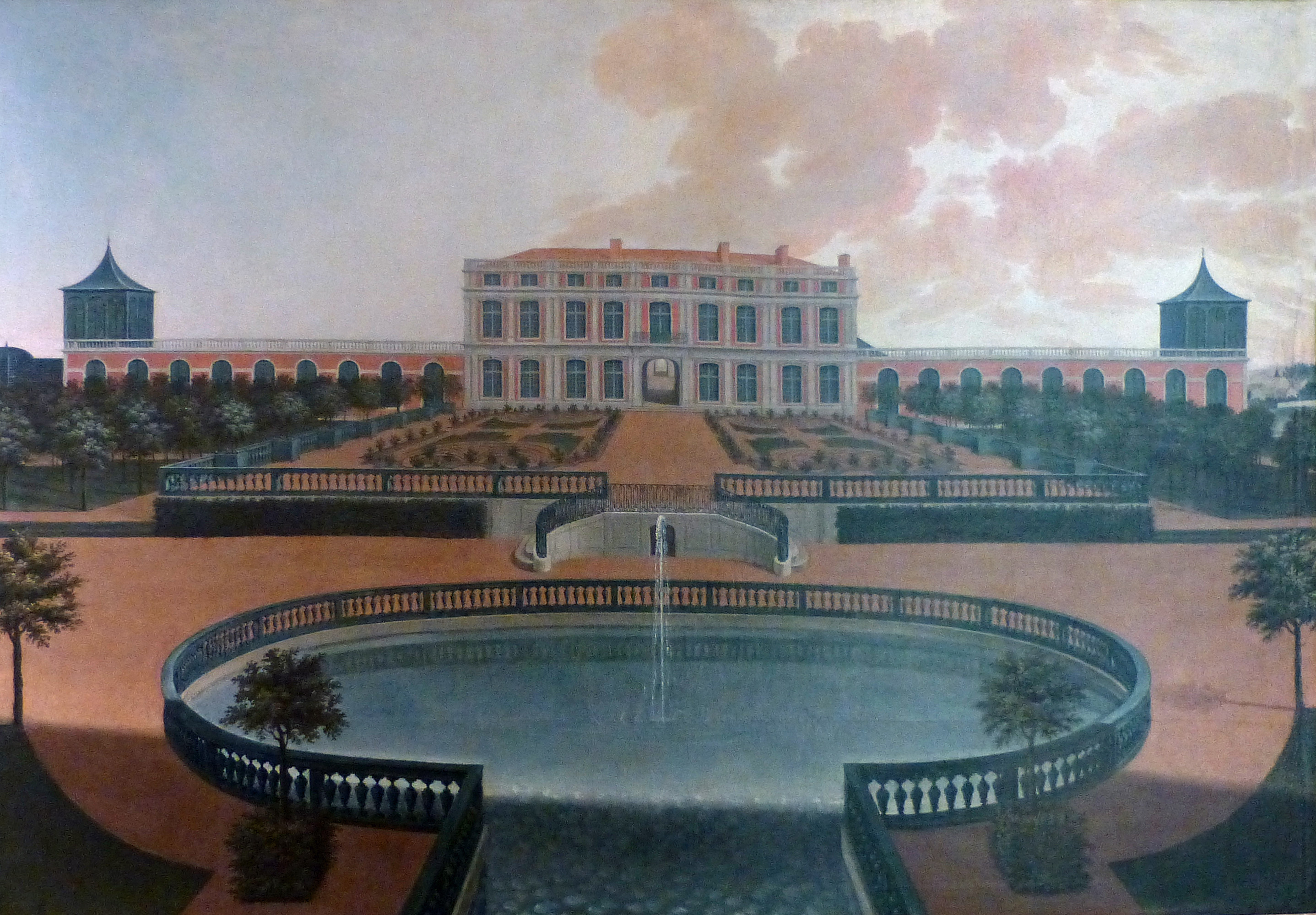
View of the Château d'Einville-au-Jard, painting after André Joly, 18th century

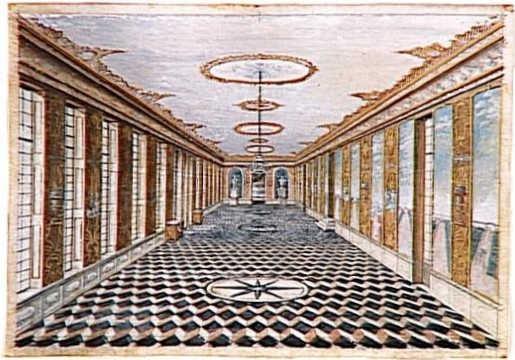
Galerie, painting 18th century

The Château d'Einville-au-Jard was a ducal residence of the House of Lorraine in Einville-au-Jard, Lorraine.

Most of it was demolished after the death of Stanisław Leszczyński in 1771.

Some auxiliary buildings and structures survived.

== See also ==
- Château de Chanteheux
- Château de Commercy
- Château de la Favorite (Lunéville)
- Château de Lunéville
- Château de la Malgrange
- Palace of the Dukes of Lorraine
