= Château de la Favorite (Lunéville) =

Castle in Grand Est, France

Coordinates: 48°35′31″N 6°30′14″E

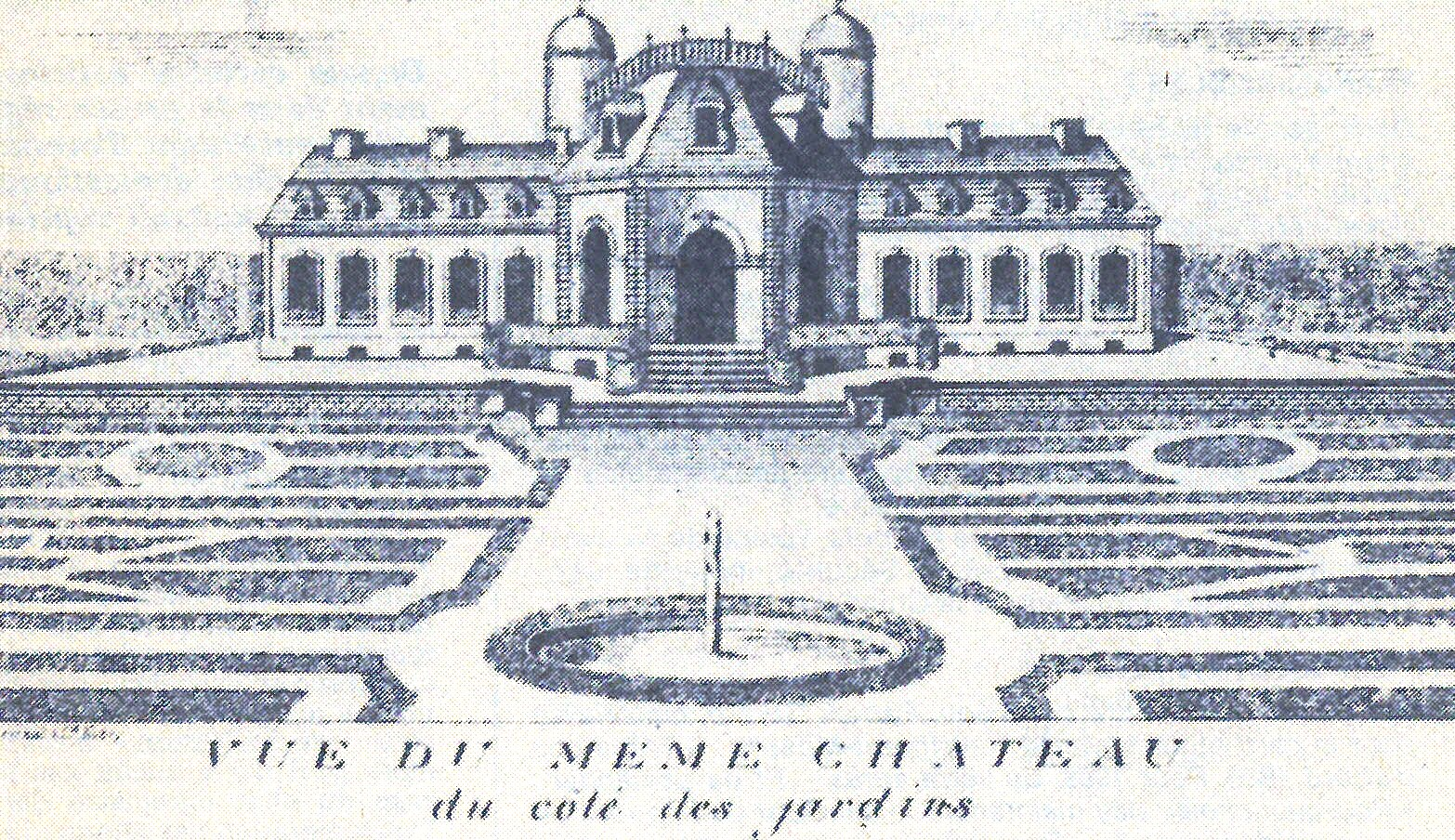
View of the Château de la Favorite, etching, 18th century

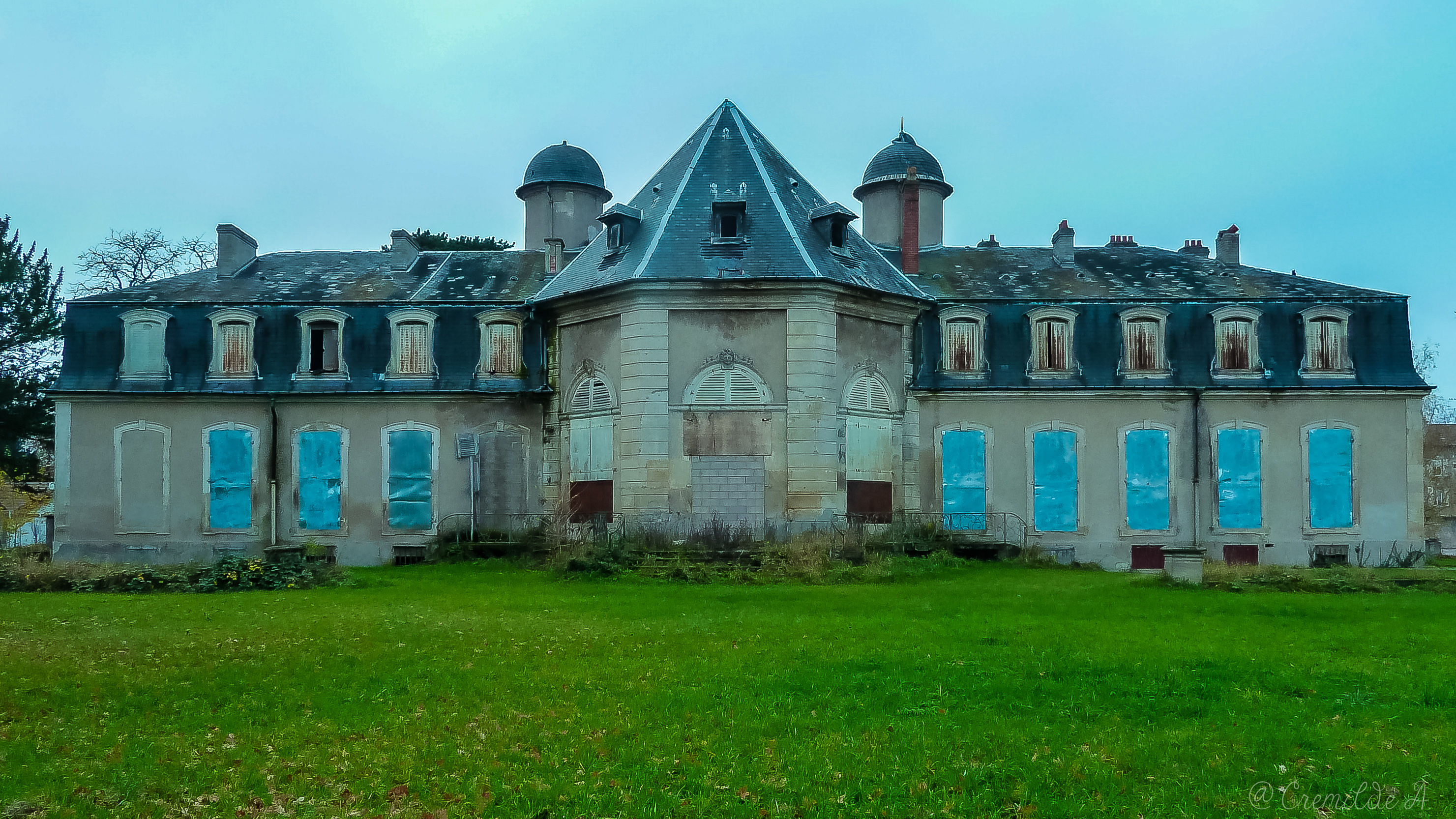
View of the château in 2011

The Château de la Favorite was a ducal residence of the House of Lorraine in Lunéville, Lorraine. It is also known as the Petit château of Prince Charles Alexander of Lorraine.

== See also ==
- Château de Chanteheux
- Château de Commercy
- Château d'Einville-au-Jard
- Château de Lunéville
- Château de la Malgrange
- Palace of the Dukes of Lorraine
