= Jarville-la-Malgrange =

- Commune
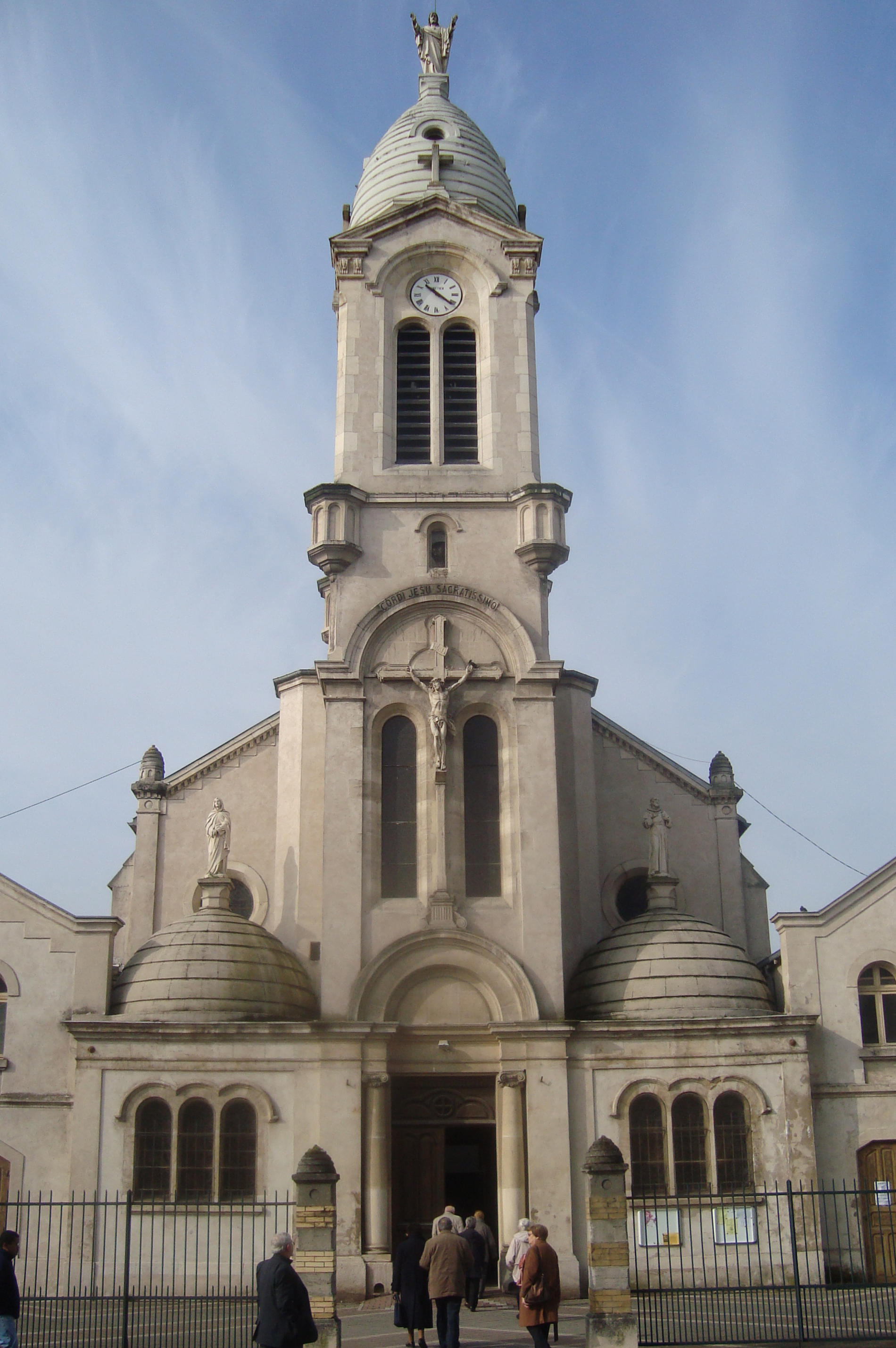
- The church in Jarville-la-Malgrange

- Coat of arms
- Location of Jarville-la-Malgrange
- Location within France Location within Grand Est
- Coordinates: 48°40′12″N 6°12′24″E
- Country: France
- Region: Grand Est
- Department: Meurthe-et-Moselle
- Arrondissement: Nancy
- Canton: Jarville-la-Malgrange
- Intercommunality: Métropole du Grand Nancy

Government
  - Mayor (2020–2026): Vincent Matheron
- Area^{1}: 2.14 km^{2} (0.83 sq mi)
- Elevation: 210 m (690 ft)
- Highest elevation: 242 m (794 ft)
- Lowest elevation: 195 m (640 ft)
- Population (2023): 9,356
  - Density: 4,370/km^{2} (11,300/sq mi)
- Demonym: Jarvillois(es)
- Time zone: UTC+01:00 (CET)
  - Summer (DST): UTC+02:00 (CEST)
- INSEE/Postal code: 54274 /54140
- Website: www.jarville-la-malgrange.fr
- ^{1} French Land Register data, which excludes lakes, ponds, glaciers > 1 km^{2} (0.386 sq mi or 247 acres) and river estuaries.

Jarville-la-Malgrange (French pronunciation: [ʒaʁvil la malɡʁɑ̃ʒ]) is a commune in the Meurthe-et-Moselle department in north-eastern France.

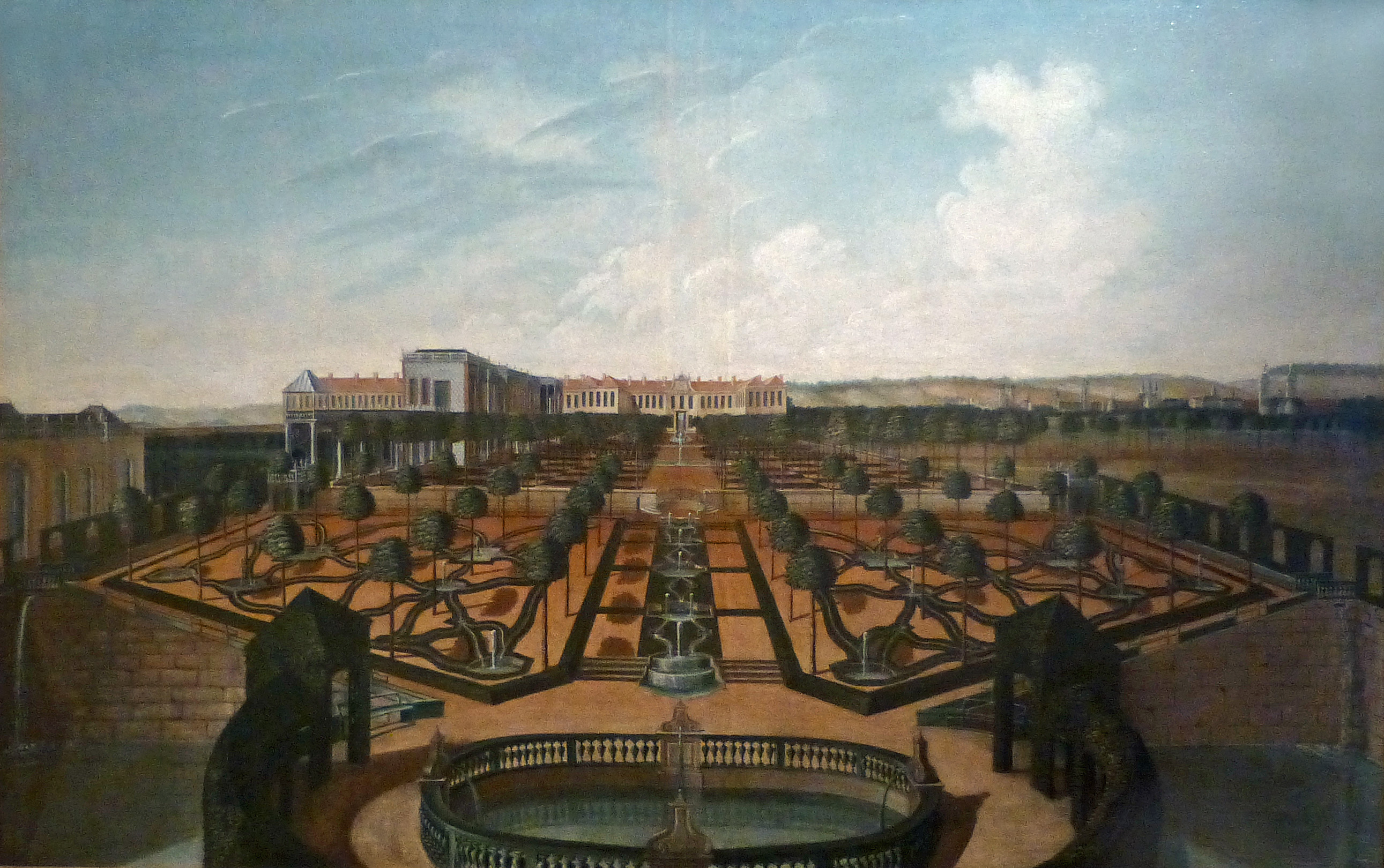
View of the Château de la Malgrange from the jardin des Goulottes, painting after André Joly, 18th century

The Château de la Malgrange was a ducal residence of the House of Lorraine here.

== Population ==
Historical population
Year	Pop.	±% p.a.
1968	12,154	—
1975	12,302	+0.17%
1982	11,350	−1.14%
1990	9,992	−1.58%
1999	9,746	−0.28%
2007	9,470	−0.36%
2012	9,363	−0.23%
2017	9,264	−0.21%
2023	9,356	+0.16%
Source: INSEE

== See also ==
- Communes of the Meurthe-et-Moselle department

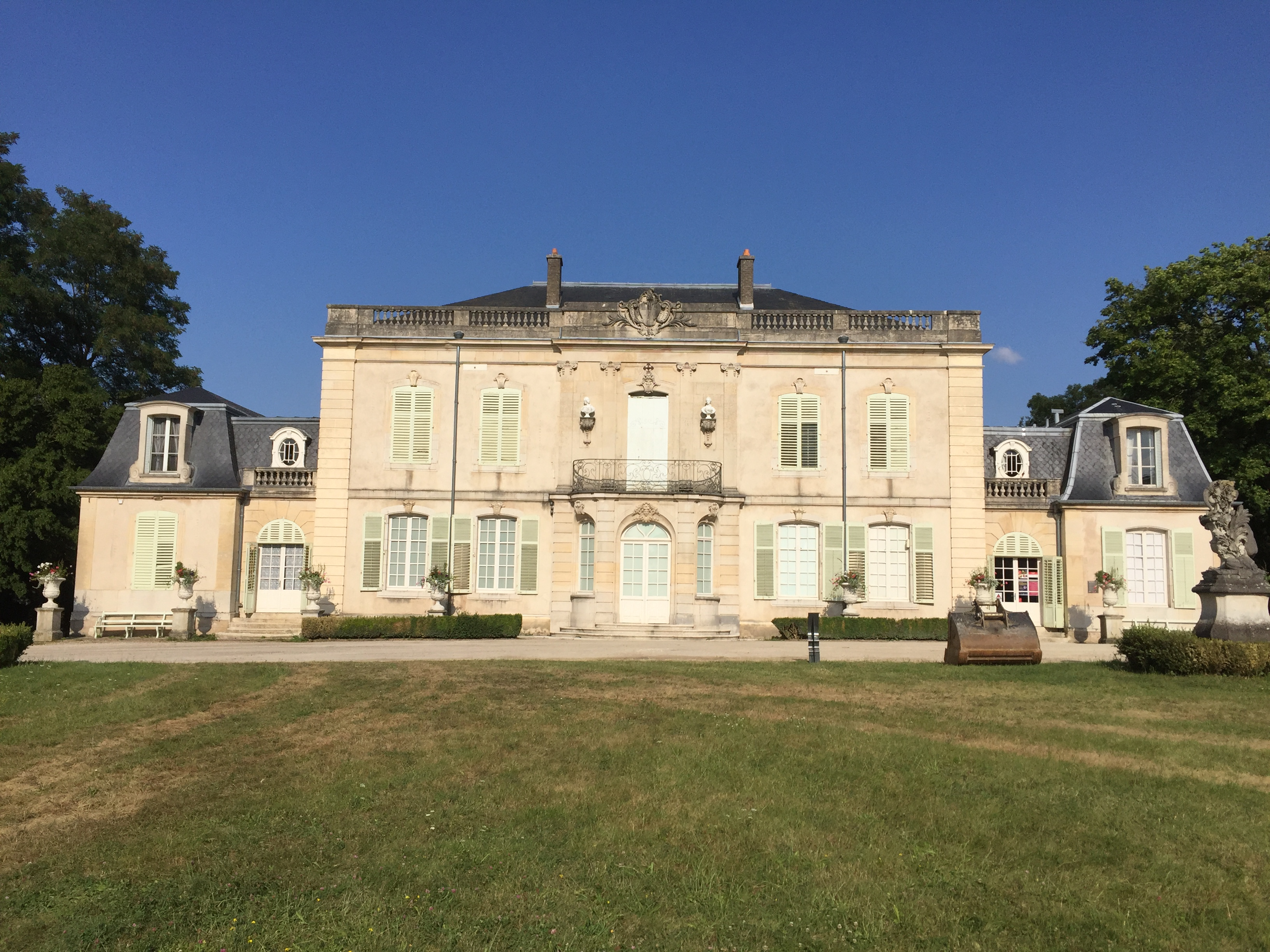
Château de Montaigu in 2018

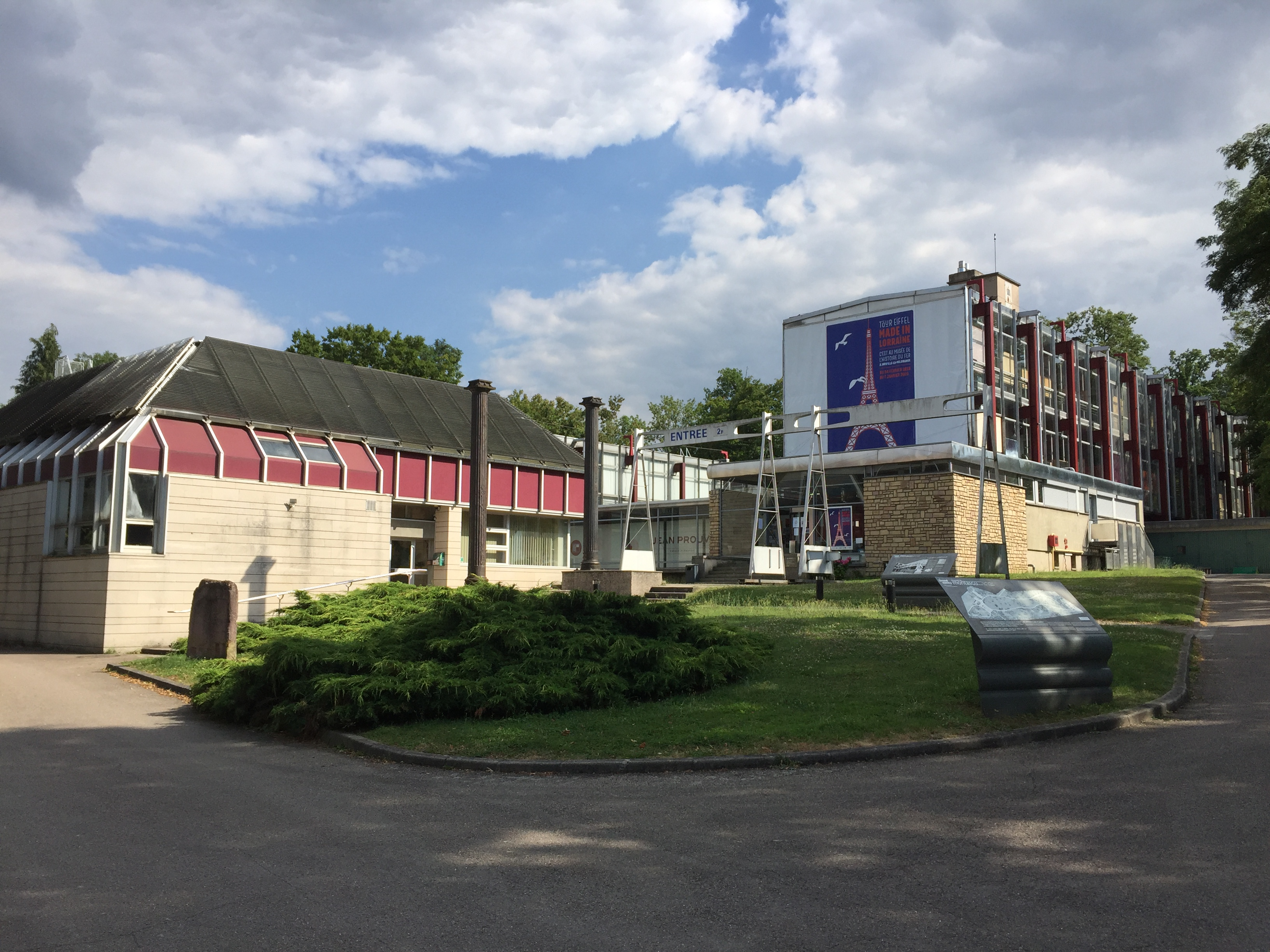
Musée de l'histoire du fer (Museum of the history of iron) in 2018
