= Charles Henri, Prince of Commercy =

Charles Henri
- Prince of Commercy and Vaudémont
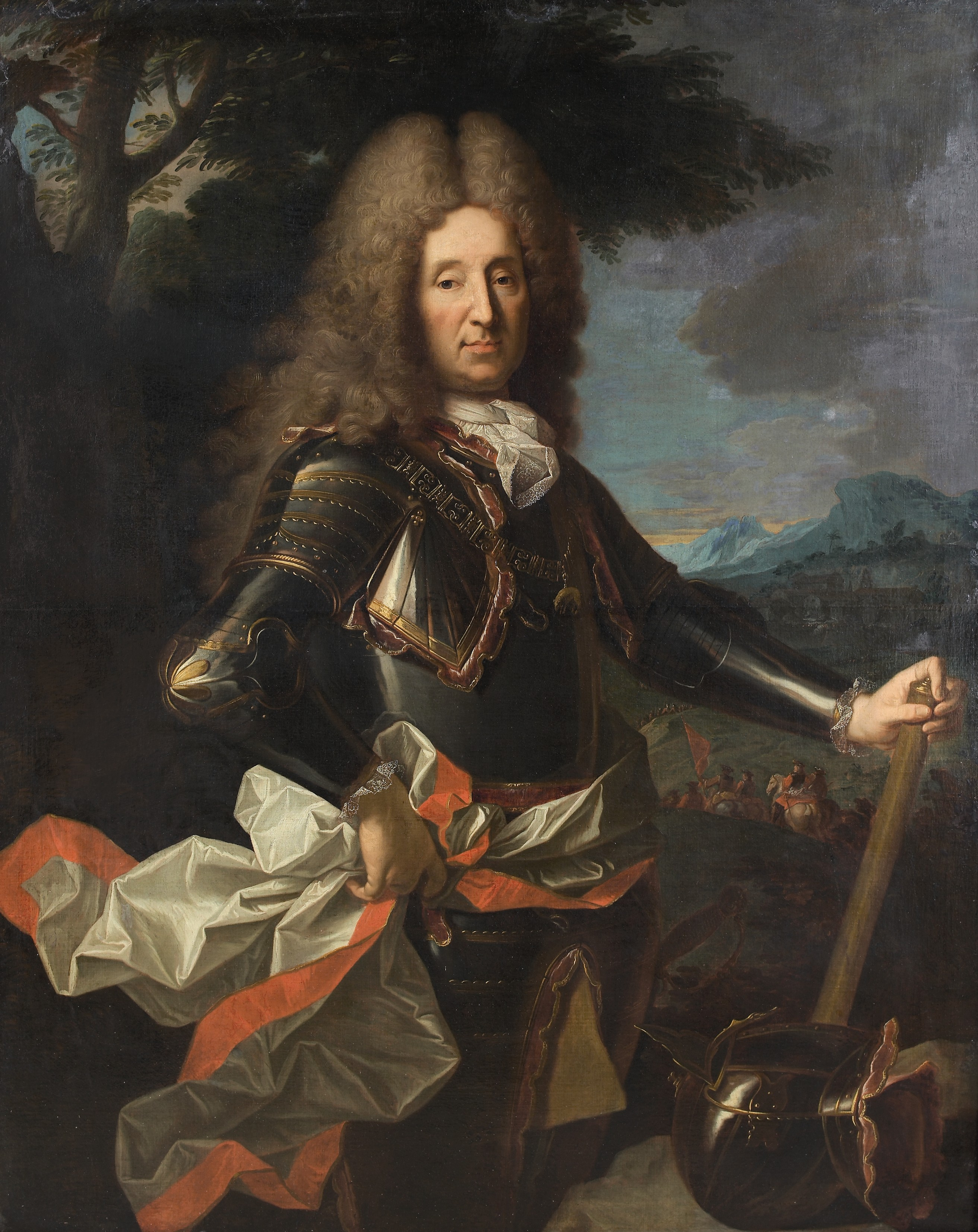
- Portrait after Jean Ranc, 17th century
- Born: 17 April 1649; Brussels, Spanish Netherlands
- Died: 14 January 1723 (aged 73); Château de Commercy, Lorraine, Kingdom of France
- Spouse: Anne Elisabeth de Lorraine
- Issue Detail: Charles Thomas, Prince of Vaudémont
Names
- Charles Henri de Lorraine
- House: Lorraine
- Father: Charles IV, Duke of Lorraine
- Mother: Béatrice de Cusance

Charles Henri of Lorraine (French: Charles Henri, Prince de Commercy, Prince de Vaudémont, pronounced [ʃaʁl ɑ̃ʁi pʁɛ̃s də kɔmɛʁsi pʁɛ̃s də vodemɔ̃]; 17 April 1649 – 14 January 1723) was the legitimated son of Charles IV, Duke of Lorraine, and Béatrix de Cusance. He was given the Principality of Commercy in 1708 by his cousin Leopold, Duke of Lorraine. He was also the Count of Falkenstein.

== Biography ==
Charles Henri was born in Brussels as the third child and only surviving son of the second marriage of Charles IV, Duke of Lorraine (there had been no children from his first marriage). This second marriage, contracted while Duke Charles was in exile, was not canonically recognized because the separation between the duke and his first wife, Nicole de Lorraine, was not recognized as a valid annulment by the Holy See. Charles Henri's claim to inherit Lorraine was therefore disputed, and rule of the duchy had been obtained by his father's younger brother through French intervention.

On 27 April 1669, in Bar-le-Duc, he married a cousin, Princess Anne Elisabeth de Lorraine, daughter of Charles de Lorraine, Duke of Elbeuf of the House of Guise. The princess was known as Mademoiselle d'Elbeuf, a style derived from her father's title. They had one son, Charles Thomas de Lorraine (1670–1704), who later took his father's non-territorial title, Prince of Vaudémont. This son was killed in battle near Ostiglia.

In exile like his father, Charles Henri served in the Spanish-Habsburg army against France, fighting in numerous battles. In 1675, he was made a knight of the Order of the Golden Fleece. He served in the Nine Years' War in Flanders under William III of England.

He was attached to the household of le Grand Dauphin along with his two nieces, the Princess of Epinoy and Béatrice Hiéronyme de Lorraine, future Abbess of Remiremont.

In 1698, he was appointed Governor of Milan. Two years later, the last Habsburg king of Spain, Charles II, died and was replaced by Louis XIV's grandson, Philip, Duke of Anjou. This triggered the War of Spanish Succession in which the territory around Milan was one of the major battlefields.

The Prince of Vaudémont accepted the new king as sovereign of Lombardy, but he was not trusted: Saint Simon suggests he passed on military information to the enemy. It is a fact that his son, Charles Thomas, became an Austrian commander.

After the Battle of Turin, the French and Spanish were forced to withdraw from Italy, and Charles Henri signed a treaty with the Imperial commander, Prince Eugene of Savoy, putting Lombardy under Austrian rule.

In 1708, the Duke of Lorraine, his cousin Leopold, gave Charles Henri the minuscule principality of Commercy. He engaged the famous architect Germain Boffrand to build the beautiful château de Commercy. The principality was later given to Élisabeth Charlotte d'Orléans, widow of Leopold.

Charles Henri de Lorraine died at the château de Commercy at the age of seventy-three, his only son having predeceased him.

== Issue ==
- Charles Thomas de Lorraine, Prince de Vaudémont (7 March 1670 – 12 May 1704) died unmarried.
