= Palace of the Dukes of Lorraine =

Monument historique in Nancy, France

Coordinates: 48°41′49″N 6°10′49″E

Ducal Palace of Nancy
- Palais ducal du Nancy (French)
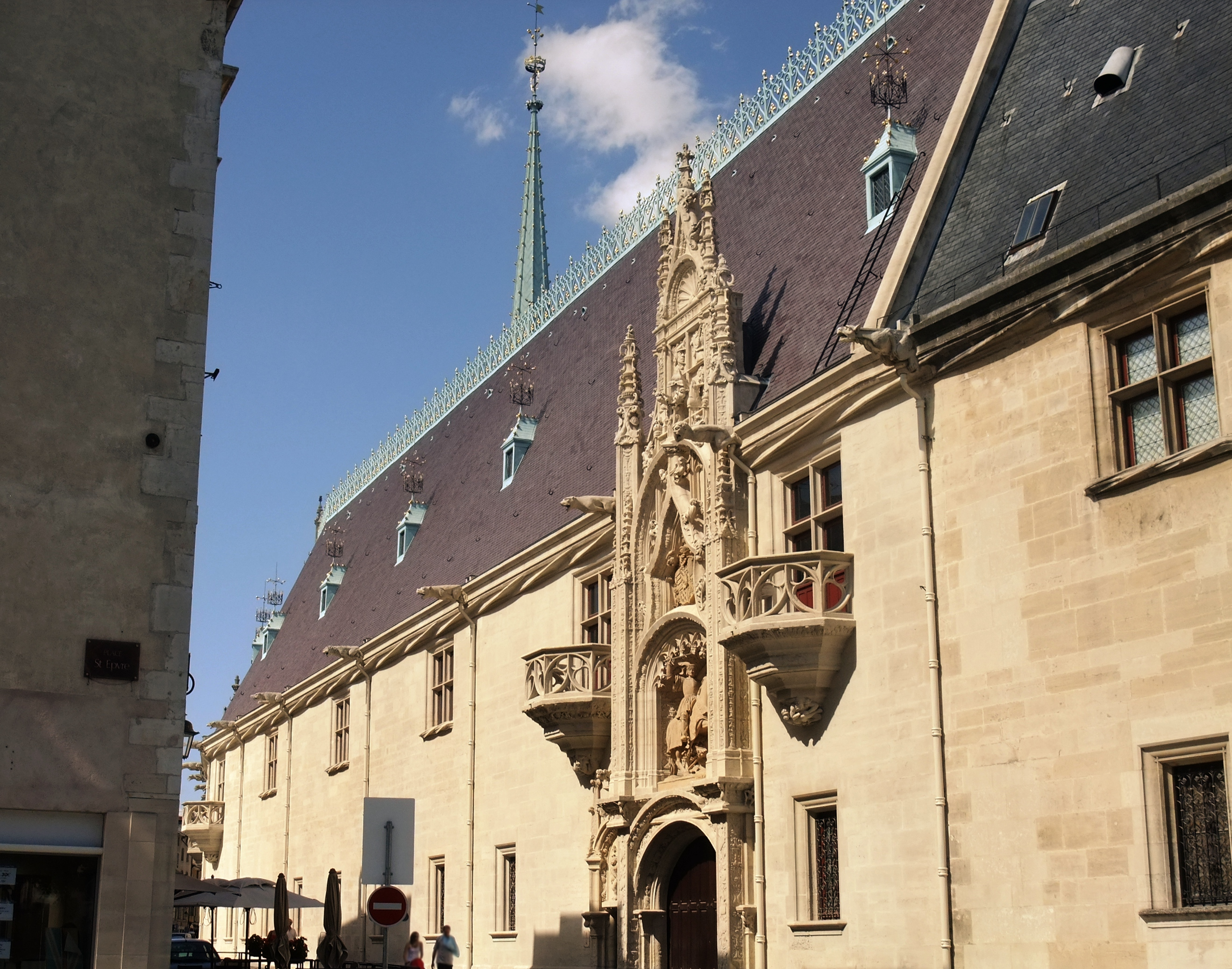

- Location within Grand Est

History
- Built: 15th century
- Built for: René II, Duke of Lorraine
- Demolished: 18th century
- Rebuilt: 18th century

Monument historique
- Designated: 1840

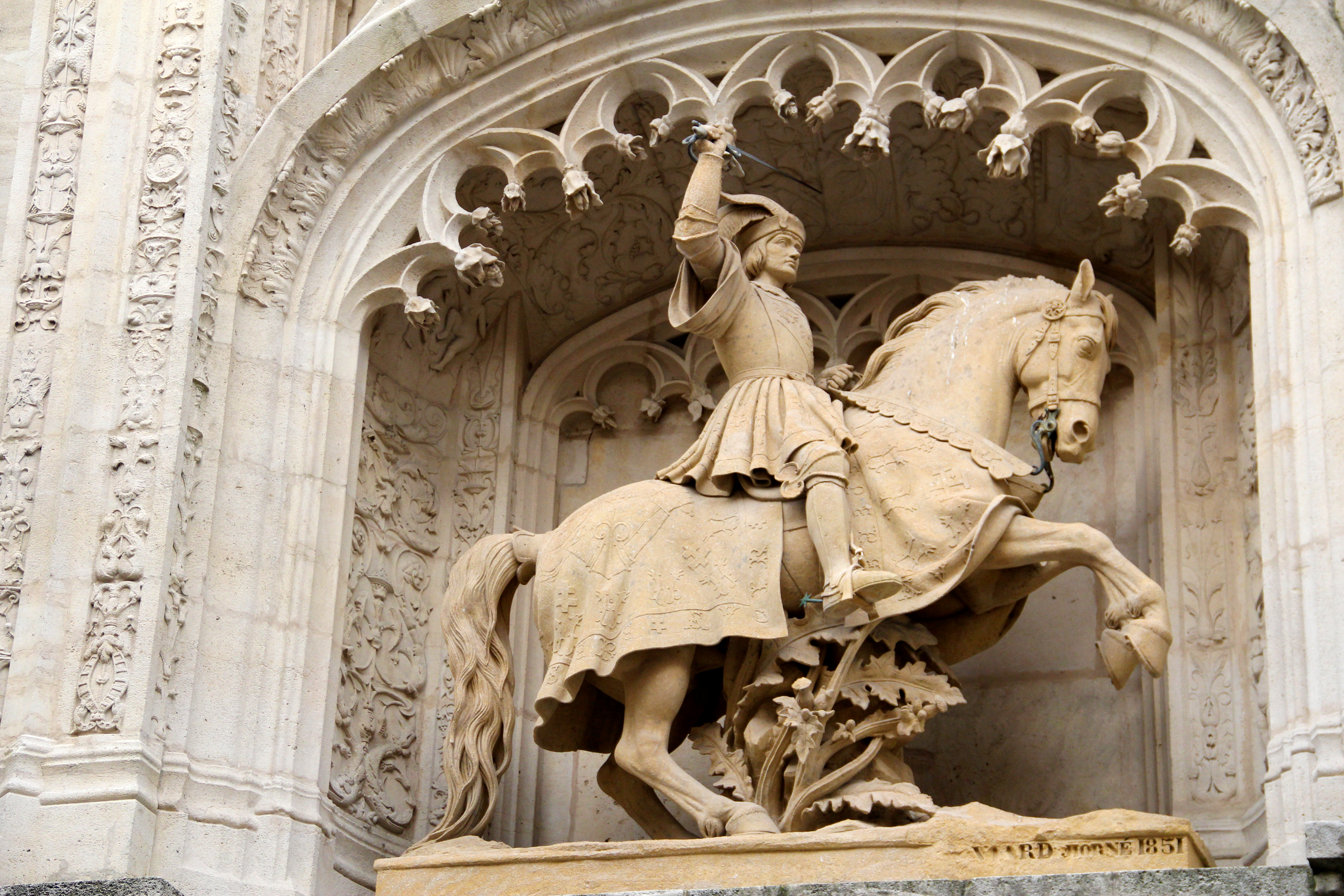
Equestrian statue of Duke Anthony of Lorraine

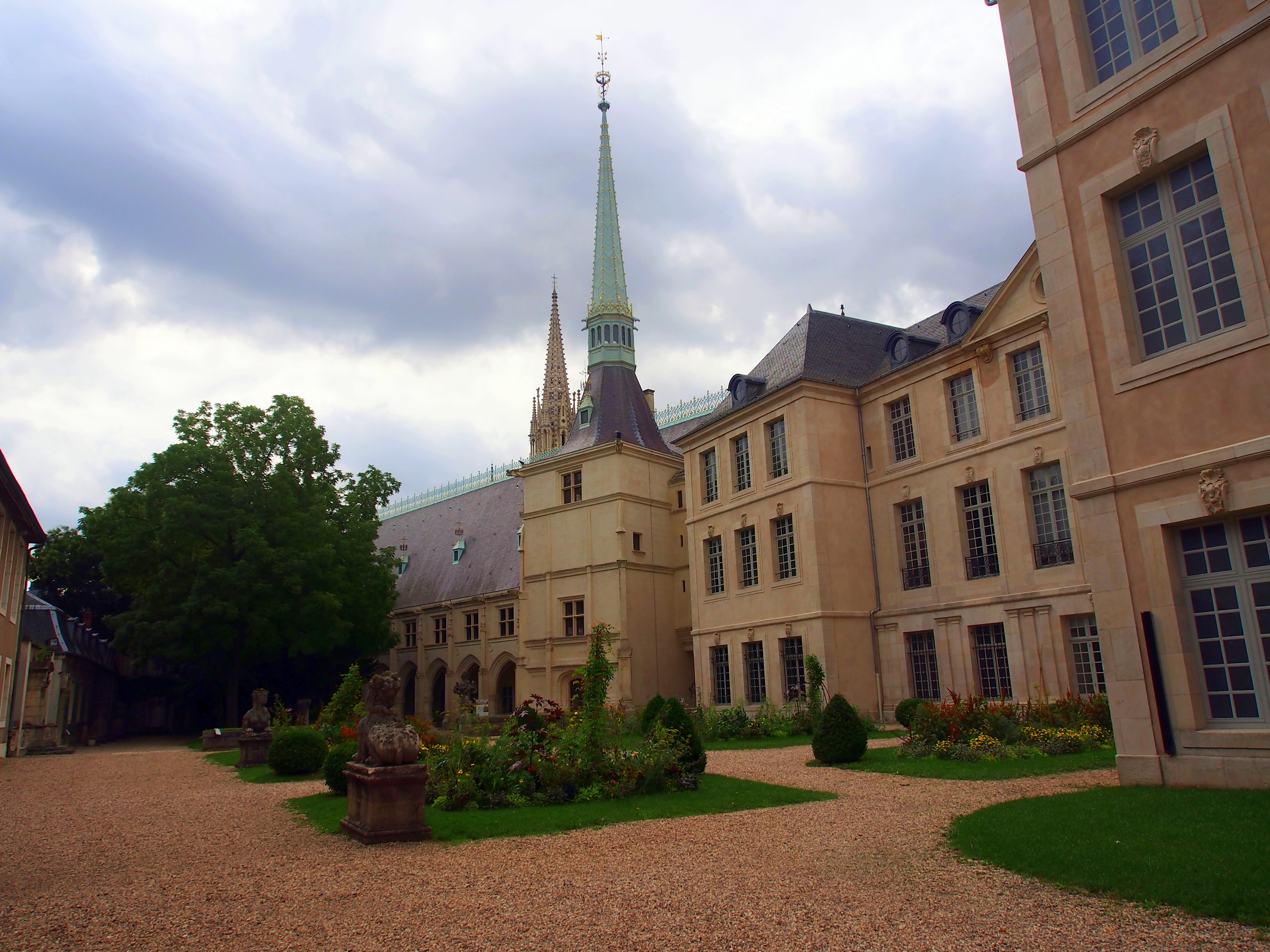
Inner courtyard of the ducal palace

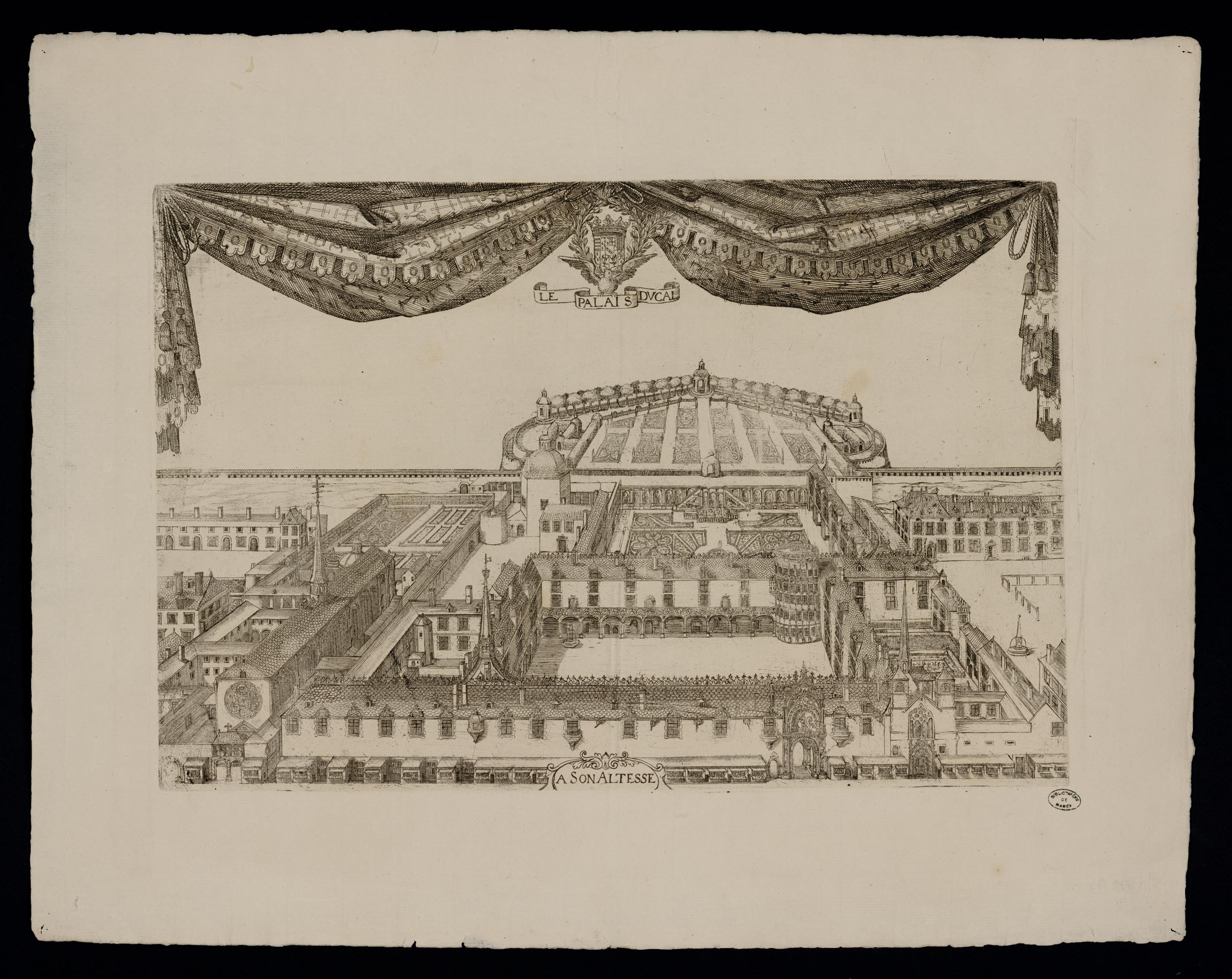
Engraving of the palace complex, 1664

The Ducal Palace of Nancy (French: Palais ducal du Nancy) is a former princely residence in Nancy, France, which was home to the Dukes of Lorraine. It houses the Musée Lorrain, one of Nancy's principal museums, dedicated to the art, history and popular traditions of Lorraine until the early 20th century. It has been listed since 1840 as a monument historique by the French Ministry of Culture.

== History ==
The palace was built in the 15th century for René II, Duke of Lorraine.

In the 18th century the palace was partly demolished under the rule of Leopold, Duke of Lorraine in preparation of greater projects he intended, but never completed. After the House of Habsburg had ceded Lorraine to French control in exchange for Tuscany, the new duke Stanisław Leszczyński resided in Lunéville. After Stanisław's death, his Duchy was inherited by his son-in-law, King Louis XV of France, and incorporated in his dominions.

The palace used to have St George's Collegiate Church, which was the house chapel and also the burial place of members of the house of Lorraine. The chapel does not exist anymore. The functions of the house chapel was then given to the Church of Saint-François-des-Cordeliers, which is located next to the palace.

The first level of the structure contains reception and dining rooms used by the Dukes, known as the Galerie des Cerfs. On the ground floor, there is an open-vaulted gallery overlooking the garden, while a portal marks the Grande Rue entrance. Also built in Gothic style, its décor suggests that it is one of the earliest examples of work from the Renaissance period in nowaday's eastern France.

== Musée Lorrain ==
In 1848 the palace was converted to house the Musée Lorrain. The museum's collections include artefacts from the Gallo-Roman and Merovingian civilisations of the east of France, religious and funeral sculptures and stained-glass windows from the Medieval period, as well as armaments from the 14th and 15th centuries. The museum also includes a collection of Renaissance art including works by Ligier Richier and sculptures relating to the history of the Palace itself, as well as of major works by Georges de La Tour and Jacques Callot, and a rare collection of Jewish ritual objects.

== See also ==
- Château de Commercy
- Château d'Einville-au-Jard
- Château de la Favorite (Lunéville)
- Château de Lunéville
- Château de la Malgrange
- List of Baroque residences
- Museum of Fine Arts of Nancy
- Palace of the Dukes of Burgundy
