= Château de Commercy =

Castle in Meuse region of France

Coordinates: 48.7638°N 5.5927°E

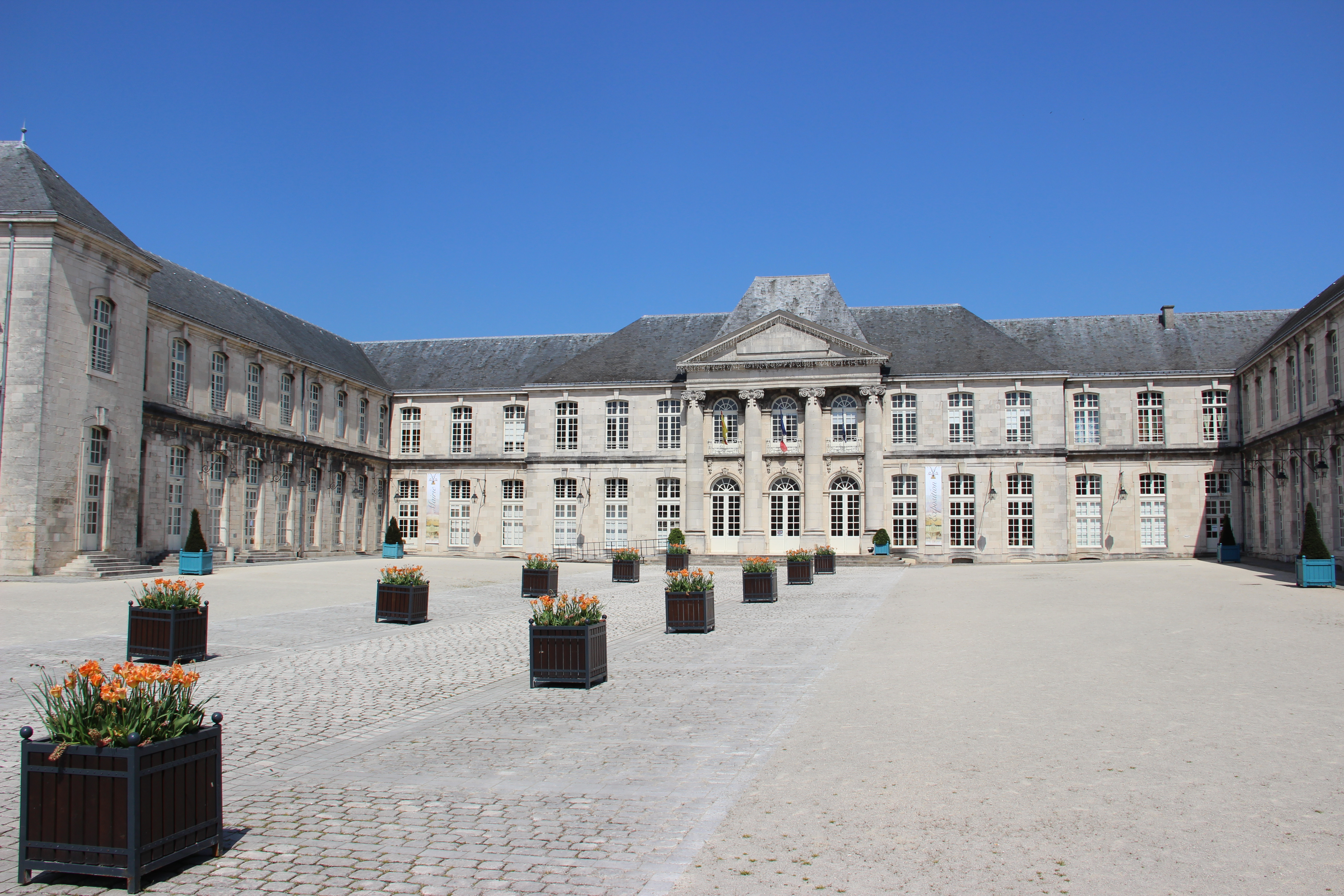
- Entrance court
- Interactive map of the Château de Commercy area
- Alternative names: Château Stanislas

General information
- Type: Château
- Architectural style: French Baroque
- Location: Commercy, France
- Construction started: 1708
- Completed: 1747
- Renovated: 1957–1977
- Client: Charles Henri de Lorraine.

Design and construction
- Architects: Germain Boffrand; Léopold Durand; Nicolas d'Orbay; Emmanuel Héré de Corny

The Château de Commercy is a castle in the town of Commercy, in the Meuse department of France. It was the principal residence of the reigning Prince of Commercy and was built by Charles Henri de Lorraine. The site, château and grounds, was classified as Monument historique in 1960, with the roofs and façades of the wings being classified in 1972.

== History ==
In 1708, Charles Henri de Lorraine, prince de Vaudémont, a legitimised son of Charles IV, Duke of Lorraine, began to reconstruct the old building to designs by Germain Boffrand. At the same time, Boffrand had also started work on the nearby Château de Lunéville, then the residence of Charles Henri's half-cousin Leopold, Duke of Lorraine, the reigning duke of Lorraine.

In 1723, Léopold was given the Principality of Commercy at the death of Charles Henri who died without heir. As such, Commercy became another land holding of the House of Lorraine. In 1729, Léopold died at Lunéville. He was succeeded by his son, Francis III of Lorraine, future spouse of Empress Maria Theresa of Austria.

At the end of War of the Polish Succession in 1737, the duchies of Lorraine and Bar were ceded to the landless ex-king of Poland, Stanislas Leszczyński, father of Marie Leszczyńska, Louis XV's Queen consort. As Stanislas moved into the Château de Lunéville, the Principality of Commercy was given to the widow of Léopold, the dowager duchess of Lorraine, Élisabeth Charlotte d'Orléans niece of Louis XIV and sister of the deceased Philippe II, Duke of Orléans.

From 11 September to 5 October 1738, Françoise de Graffigny paid "Madame de Lorraine" a farewell visit at Commercy, and her letters to François-Antoine Devaux paint a lively picture of life there.

When the Dowager Duchess of Lorraine died of a stroke, at Commercy, on 23 December 1744, ownership of the château reverted to Stanislas Leszczyński, under whom it had its golden age. He and his court made frequent visits to Commercy, where etiquette was more relaxed and social pleasures were the main occupation. In the summer of 1748, Voltaire, Émilie du Châtelet and Jean-François de Saint-Lambert spent July and part of August there. In 1755, Madeleine Paulmier stayed at the château and, according to legend, gave her name to a cake, gâteau Madeleine. Eventually the site became known locally as the Château Stanislas.

At the death of Stanislas, in 1766, the duchies of Lorraine and Bar passed to the French crown. The building then became quarters for a local cavalry unit.

Neglected, the gardens quickly became overgrown; the once great parterre and the Grand Canal were destroyed, and their original site is today occupied by small buildings. Some old decorative pieces however can be seen on the shore of the Meuse river.

For decades, the area was a ruin. In the 19th century, it again served the military by being the quarters of a garrison.

The 20th century saw the building being used as lodgings for soldiers in 1940 during World War II; on 31 August 1944, the château was heavily damaged by fire; and, in 1957, the city of Commercy acquired the ruins from the State in order to carry out its restoration. Completed in 1977, it included the reconstruction of the courtyard façade (above picture) facing the town, and the restoration of the handsome square in the shape of a horseshoe.

Today, the château houses Commercy's town hall, municipal library, and several administrative offices.

=== Owners ===
- 1708–1723 : Charles Henri de Lorraine, Prince of Vaudémont
- 1723–1729 : Leopold, Duke of Lorraine
- 1729–1737 : Francis III, Duke of Lorraine
- 1737–1744 : Élisabeth Charlotte d'Orléans, Dowager Duchess of Lorraine, Princess of Commercy
- 1744–1766 : Stanislas Leszczyński
- 1766–1793 : French State

=== Gallery ===
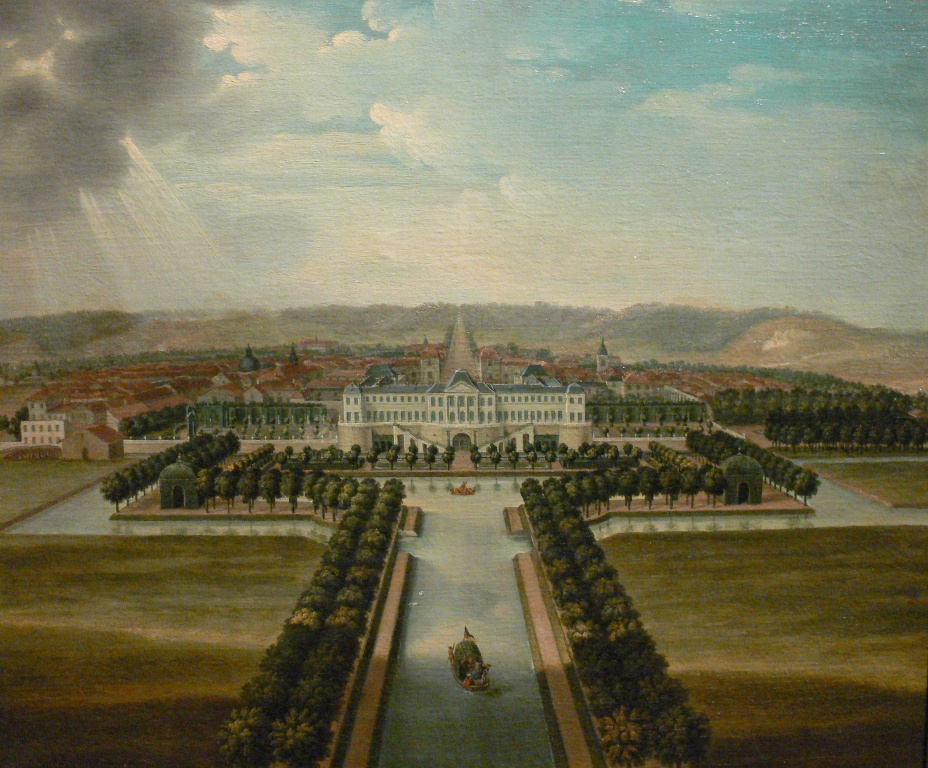
View of the castle and town of Commercy, by an anonymous artist (18th century); Museum of Fine Arts of Nancy, France

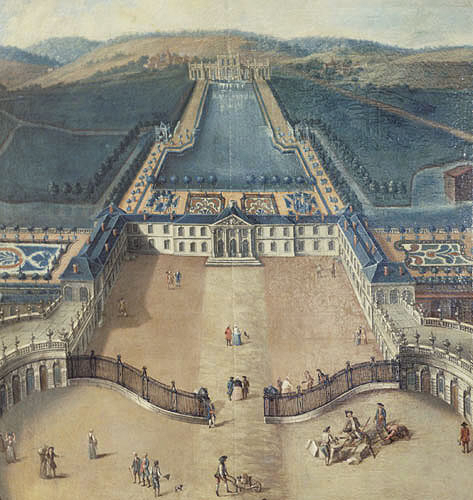
Commercy, by an anonymous artist (18th century); Château de Lunéville, France

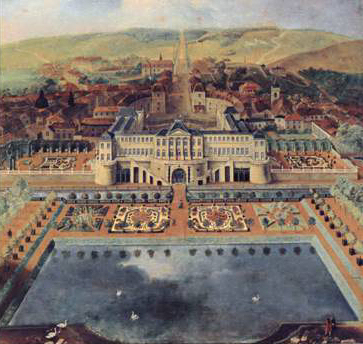
The parterre and pièce d'eau in front of the castle of Commercy, by an anonymous artist (18th century)

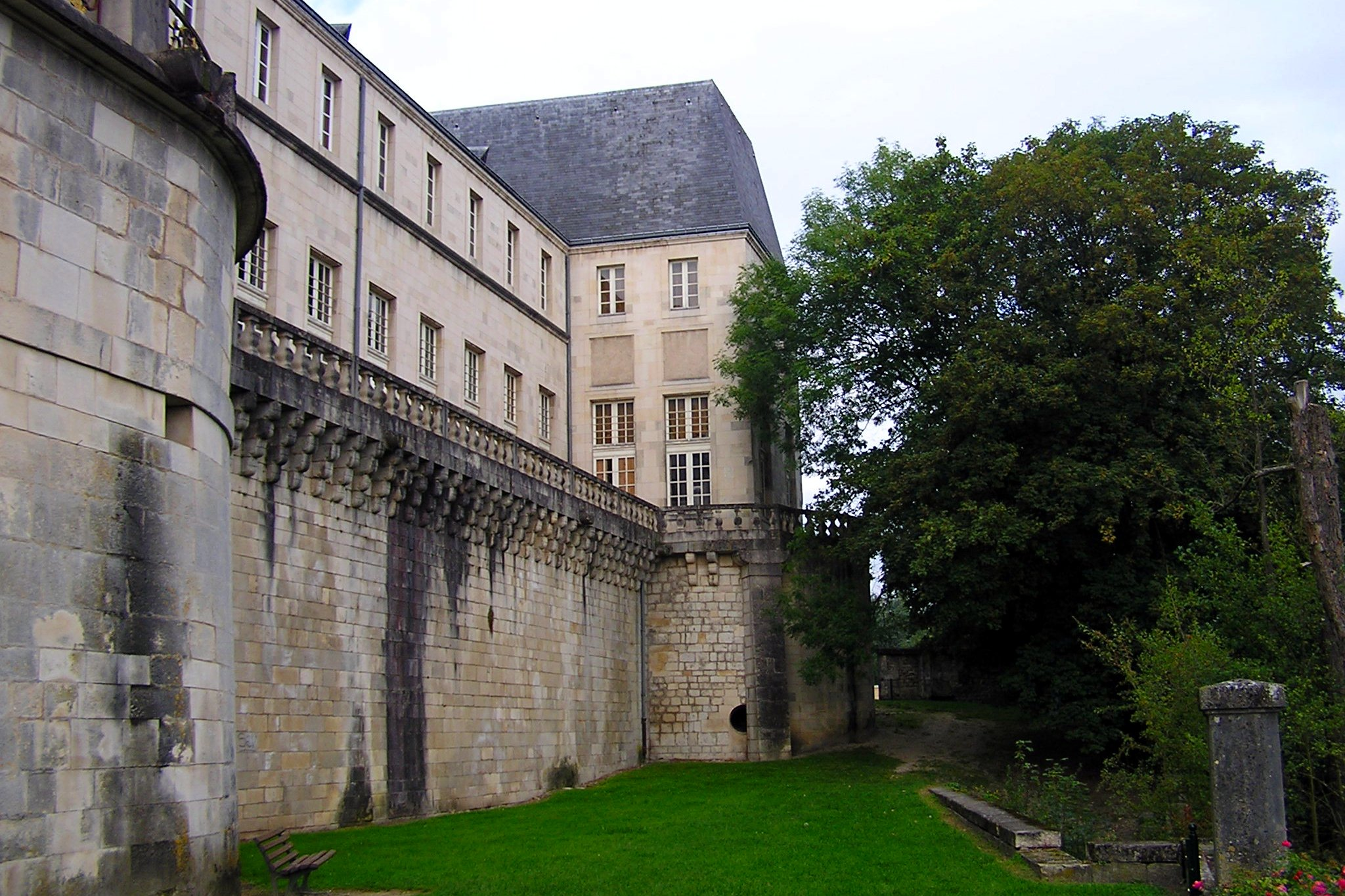
Back view of the château of Commercy (photo Emmanuel Brunner, 2007)

== See also ==
- Château de Chanteheux
- Château d'Einville-au-Jard
- Château de la Favorite (Lunéville)
- Château de Lunéville
- Château de la Malgrange
- Palace of the Dukes of Lorraine
- List of Baroque residences
