= Château de la Malgrange =

Château in Lorraine, France

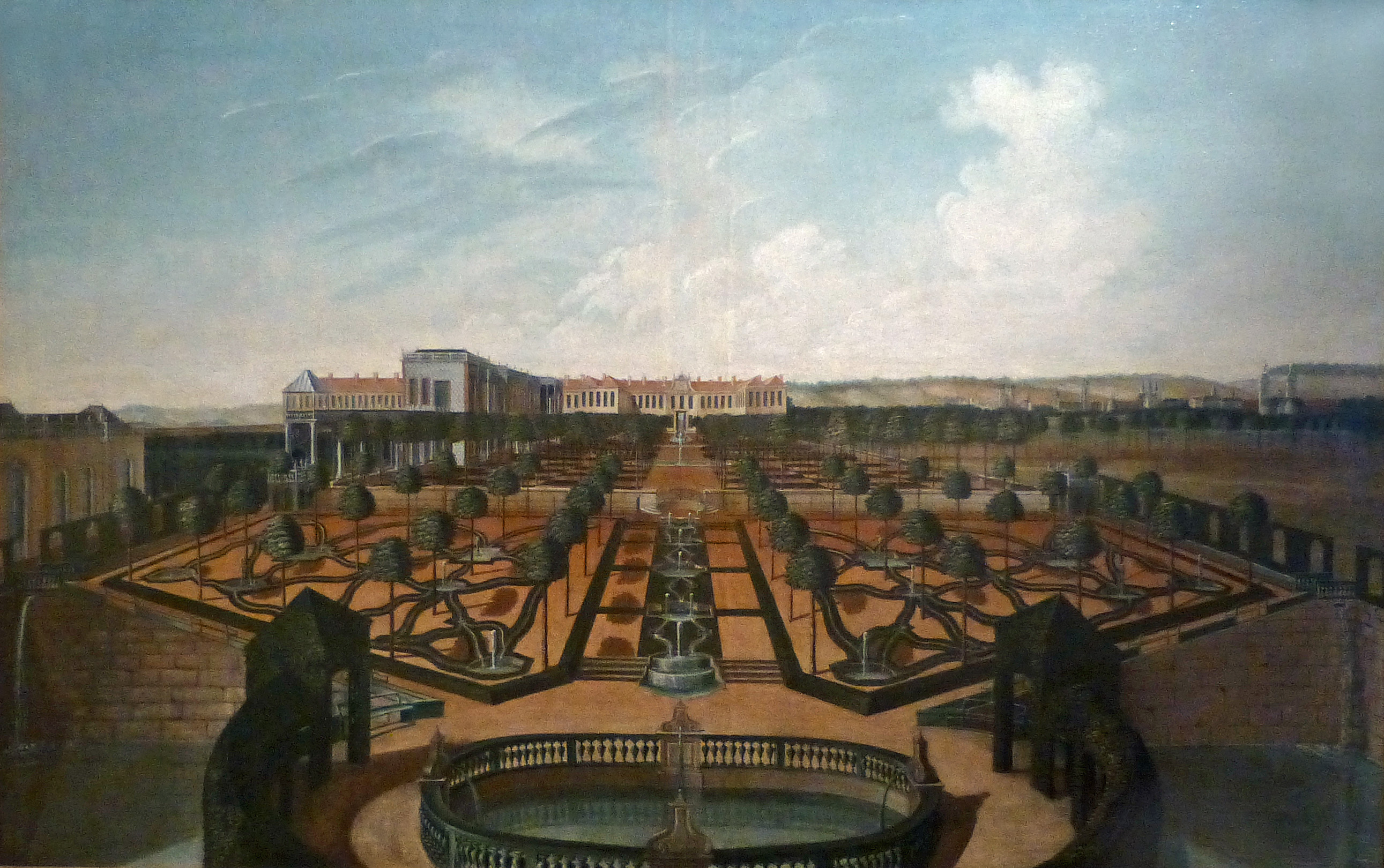
View of the Château de la Malgrange from the jardin des Goulottes, painting after André Joly, 18th century

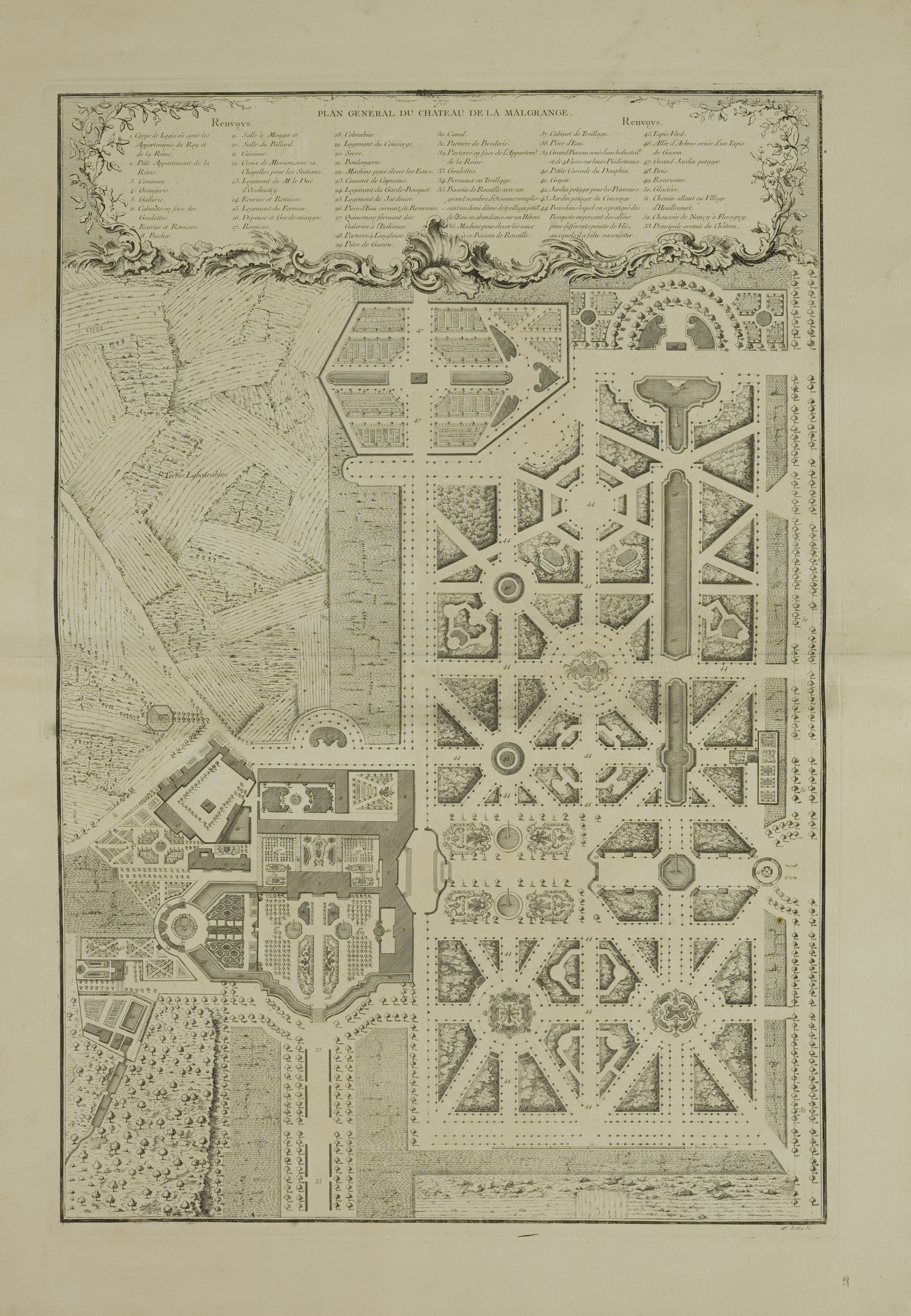
Layout plan by Emmanuel Héré, between 1750 and 1753

The Château de la Malgrange was a ducal residence of the House of Lorraine in Jarville-la-Malgrange, Lorraine.

Various designs were made for it. Duke Franciszek Maksymilian Ossoliński died here in 1756.

A school opened in the building in 1836.

Some scholars have argued its architecture influenced the royal Sans-Souci Palace in Haiti.

== See also ==
- Château de Chanteheux
- Château de Commercy
- Château d'Einville-au-Jard
- Château de la Favorite (Lunéville)
- Château de Lunéville
- Palace of the Dukes of Lorraine
