= André Joly =

French court painter (1706 – after 1781)

André Joly (1706 – 1781?) was a court painter from Lorraine. His last name was also spelled Jolly. Born in Saint-Nicolas-de-Port, his place of death and year is uncertain, but presumed to be in Paris after 1781.

He painted a number of views of the residences of the Duke of Lorraine, such as the Château d'Einville-au-Jard, Château de Lunéville, and the Château de la Malgrange. He was court painter to king Stanislaus I.

== Images ==
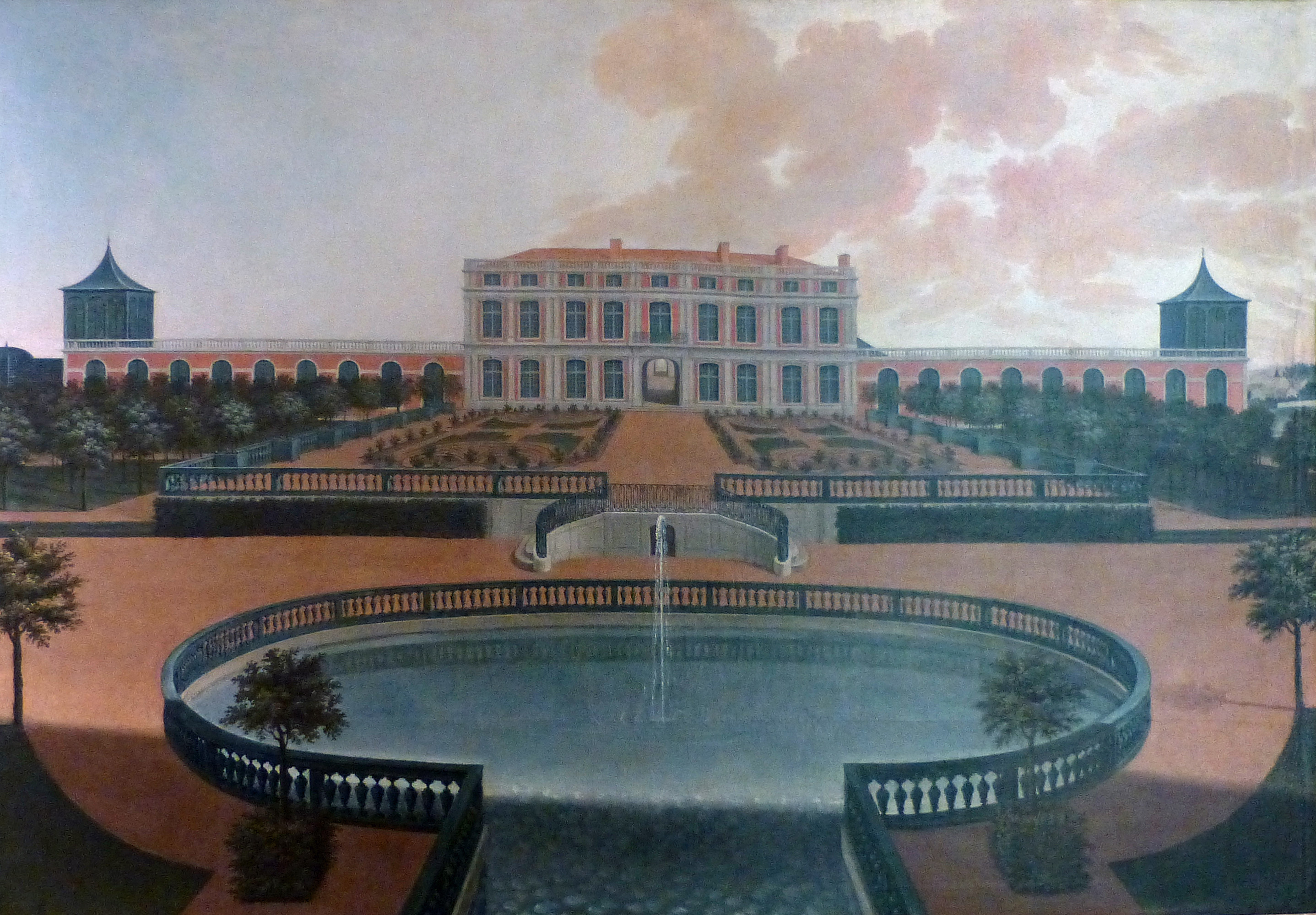
Château d'Einville-au-Jard, c. 1730

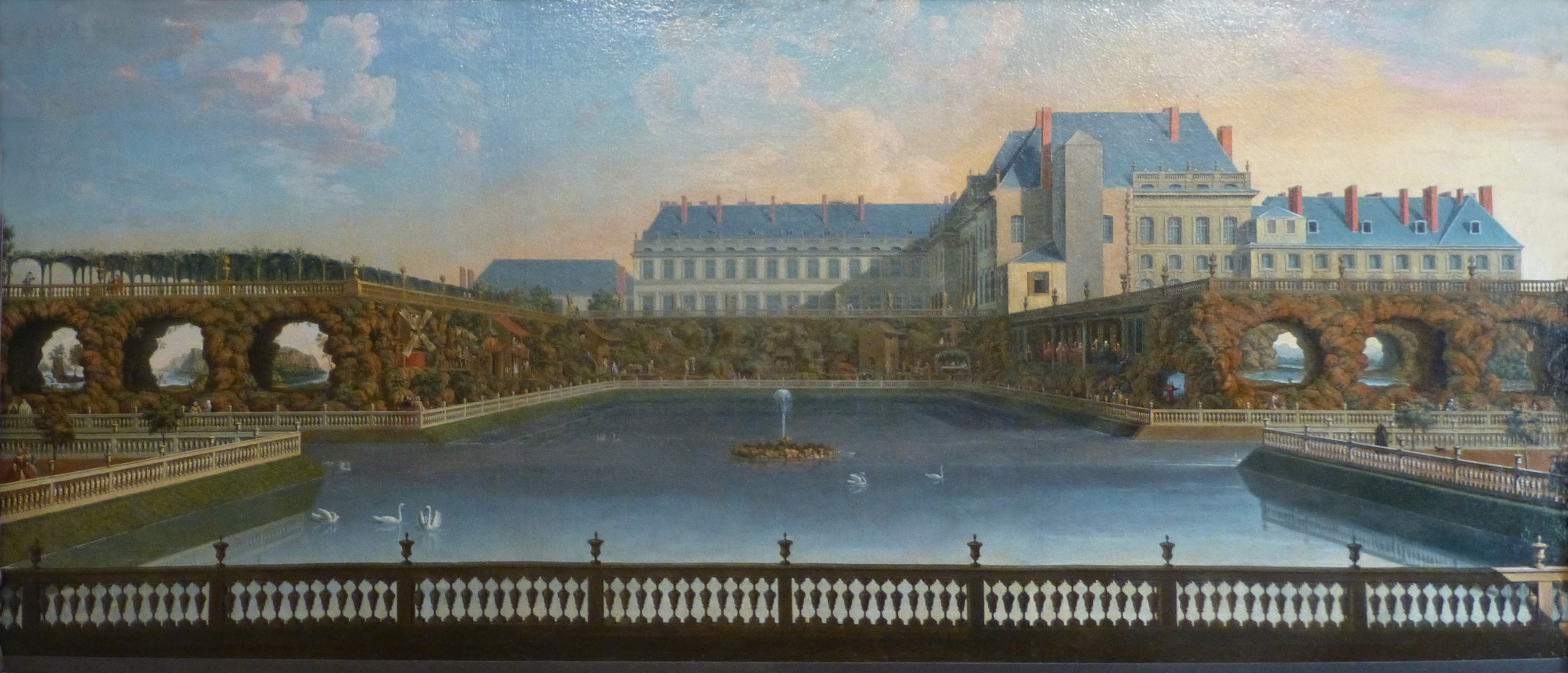
Château de Lunéville, vue du Rocher. c. 1760

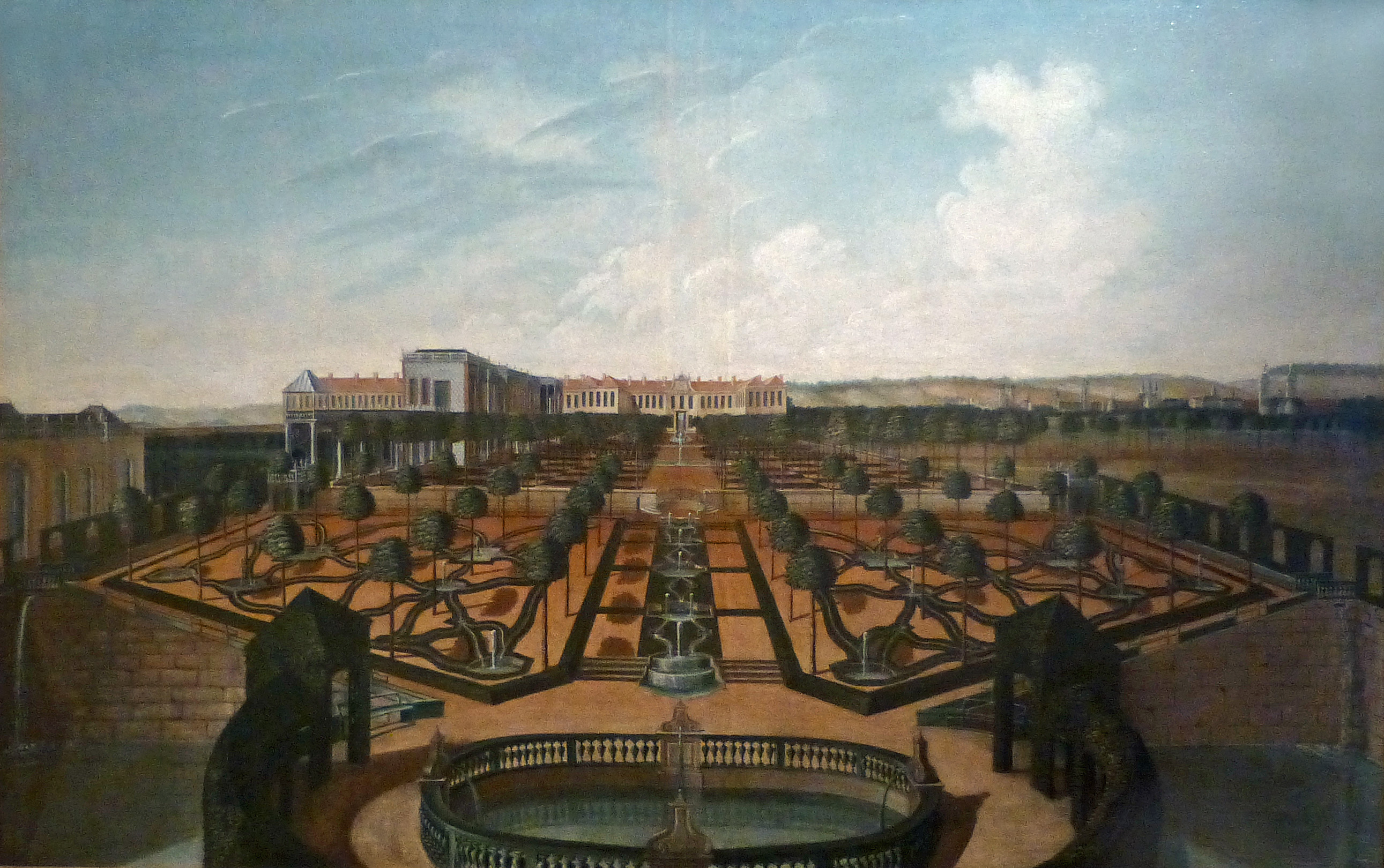
Château de la Malgrange, vue du jardin des Goulottes
