= Thiébauménil =

- Commune
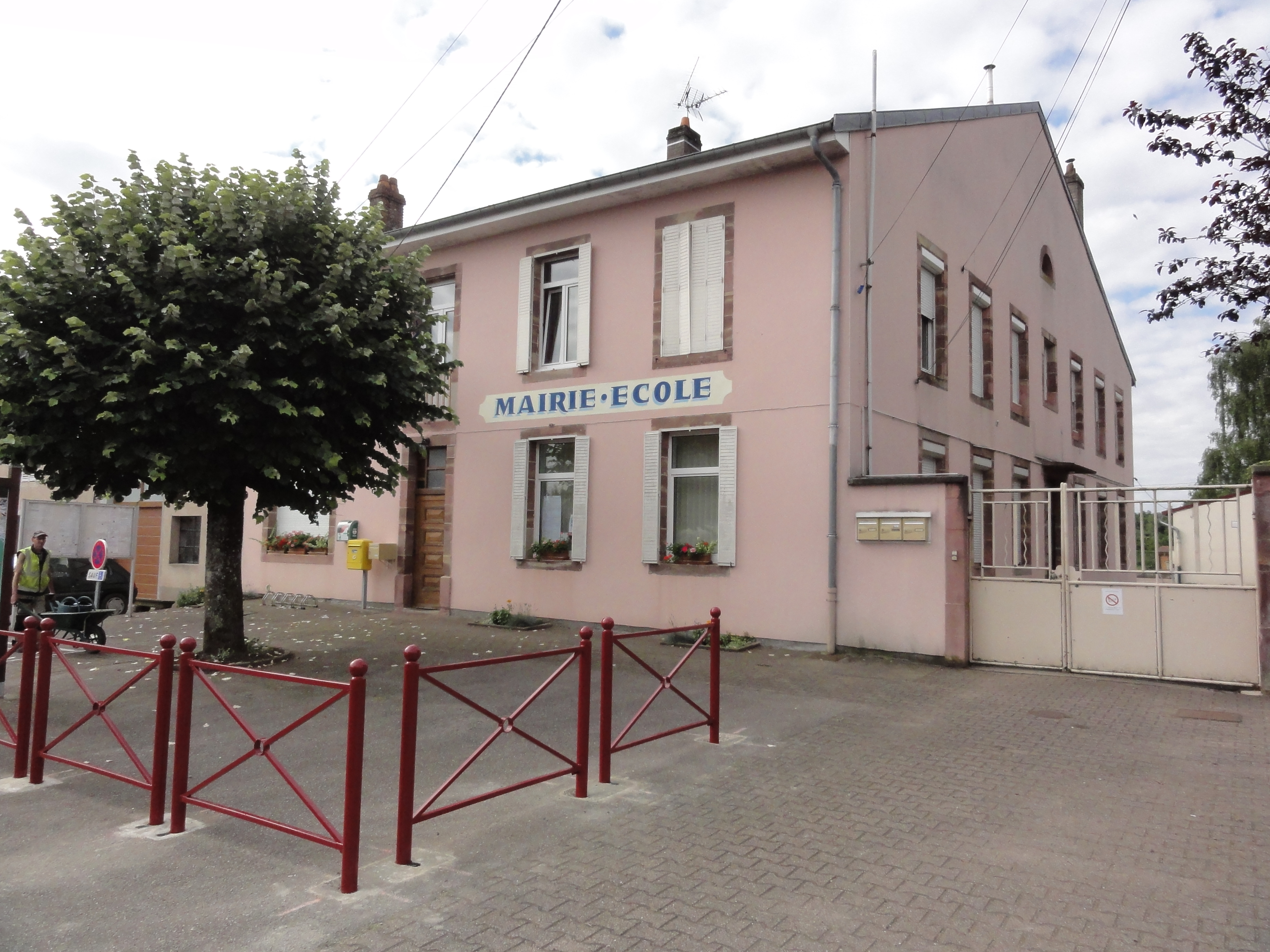
- The town hall in Thiébauménil

- Coat of arms
- Location of Thiébauménil
- Location within France Location within Grand Est
- Coordinates: 48°34′50″N 6°37′24″E
- Country: France
- Region: Grand Est
- Department: Meurthe-et-Moselle
- Arrondissement: Lunéville
- Canton: Baccarat
- Intercommunality: CC Territoire de Lunéville à Baccarat

Government
  - Mayor (2020–2026): Dominique Robert
- Area^{1}: 3.87 km^{2} (1.49 sq mi)
- Elevation: 240 m (790 ft)
- Highest elevation: 293 m (961 ft)
- Lowest elevation: 232 m (761 ft)
- Population (2023): 383
  - Density: 99.0/km^{2} (256/sq mi)
- Time zone: UTC+01:00 (CET)
  - Summer (DST): UTC+02:00 (CEST)
- INSEE/Postal code: 54520 /54300
- ^{1} French Land Register data, which excludes lakes, ponds, glaciers > 1 km^{2} (0.386 sq mi or 247 acres) and river estuaries.

Thiébauménil (French pronunciation: [tjebomenil]) is a commune in the Meurthe-et-Moselle department in Grand Est, France.

== Geography ==
Thiébauménil is located on the Vezouze at 3,500m. To the west stretches a vast plateau with siliceous soil, to the east rises a hillside with clay soil towards Manonviller where a fort was established.

The town is 10 km from Lunéville.

== Town Planning ==
=== Typology ===
Thiébauménil is a rural municipality, because it is one of the low or very low density municipalities, within the meaning of the INSEE municipal density grid.

In addition, the commune is part of the Nancy attraction area, of which it is a commune of the crown. This area, which includes 353 municipalities, is categorized in areas with 200,000 to less than 700,000 inhabitants.

=== Land use ===
The land cover of the municipality, as it appears from the European biophysical land cover database Corine Land Cover (CLC), is marked by the importance of agricultural land (66.9% in 2018), a proportion roughly equivalent to that of 1990 (66.4%). The detailed distribution in 2018 is as follows: arable land (37.5%), forests (23.9%), grasslands (19.4%), heterogeneous agricultural areas (10%), urbanized areas (9%), areas industrial or commercial and communication networks (0.2%).

The IGN also provides an online tool to compare the evolution over time of land use in the municipality (or territories at different scales). Several periods are accessible in the form of maps or aerial photos: the Cassini map (18th century), the staff map (1820-1866) and the current period (1950 to today).

== Toponymy ==
From a personal name Theotbald (Thibaut) + mansionile.

Tibamesni (1152), Theobalmasnil (1156), Thiebautmanil (1268).

== History ==
The villages of Thiébauménil and Marainviller have intimately intertwined histories. Their territories have been part of the many possessions of the Abbey of Belchamp since the 12th century.

Devastated during the Thirty Years War, Thiébauménil suffered a fire on 26 September 1632 which destroyed 42 homes. After the wars, in 1712, the parish had only 25 households. There were 135 in 1888. Thiébauménil was again annexed on 3 July 1811 to Marainviller.

On 13 August 1911 a station on the line from Lunéville to Blâmont and Badonviller (the LBB) was inaugurated in Thiébauménil by Minister Albert Lebrun. The line's traffic operated until 1942. The station, located south of the town, became a dwelling in the 21st century.

== Demographics ==
Historical population
Year	Pop.	±% p.a.
1968	271	—
1975	237	−1.90%
1982	329	+4.80%
1990	332	+0.11%
1999	360	+0.90%
2007	387	+0.91%
2012	393	+0.31%
2017	380	−0.67%
2023	383	+0.13%
Source: INSEE

== Economy ==
Basketry was a traditional activity of the town.

As of 24 August 2021 Thiébauménil has 27 establishments: 13 in the operation of real estate, 7 in animal production, 3 in non-store trade, 2 in administration and 2 for human health.

== See also ==
- Communes of the Meurthe-et-Moselle department
