= Chanteheux =

- Commune
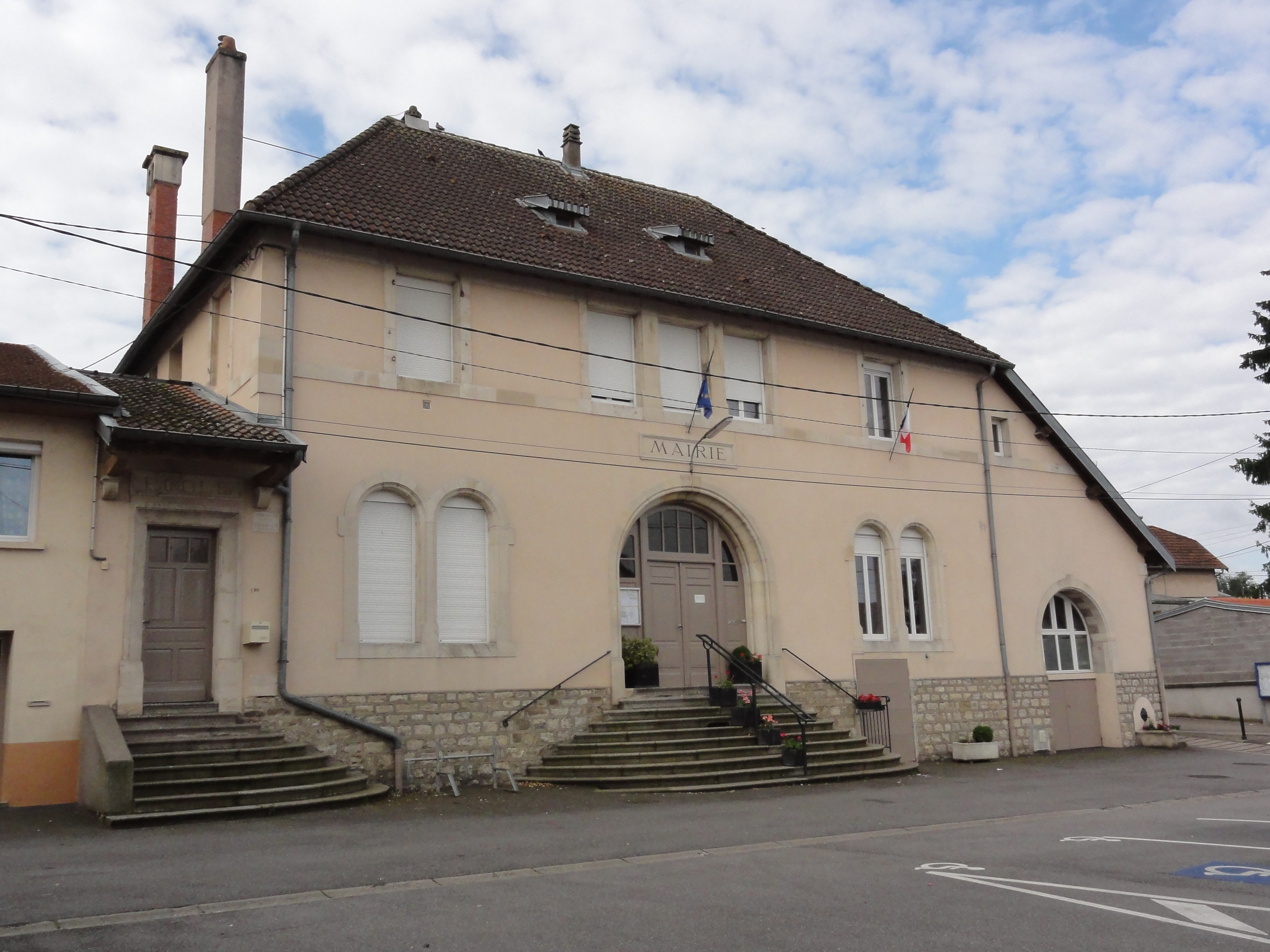
- The town hall in Chanteheux

- Coat of arms
- Location of Chanteheux
- Location within France Location within Grand Est
- Coordinates: 48°36′03″N 6°31′53″E
- Country: France
- Region: Grand Est
- Department: Meurthe-et-Moselle
- Arrondissement: Lunéville
- Canton: Lunéville-2
- Intercommunality: CC Territoire de Lunéville à Baccarat

Government
  - Mayor (2020–2026): Jacques Dewaele
- Area^{1}: 5.79 km^{2} (2.24 sq mi)
- Elevation: 230 m (750 ft)
- Highest elevation: 249 m (817 ft)
- Lowest elevation: 222 m (728 ft)
- Population (2023): 2,111
  - Density: 365/km^{2} (944/sq mi)
- Demonym: Cantenois(e)
- Time zone: UTC+01:00 (CET)
  - Summer (DST): UTC+02:00 (CEST)
- INSEE/Postal code: 54116 /54300
- ^{1} French Land Register data, which excludes lakes, ponds, glaciers > 1 km^{2} (0.386 sq mi or 247 acres) and river estuaries.

Chanteheux (French pronunciation: [ʃɑ̃t(ə)ø]) is a commune in the Meurthe-et-Moselle department in north-eastern France.

== Geography ==
Chanteheux is located in the north-east of Lunéville. The commune is crossed by the Vezouze.

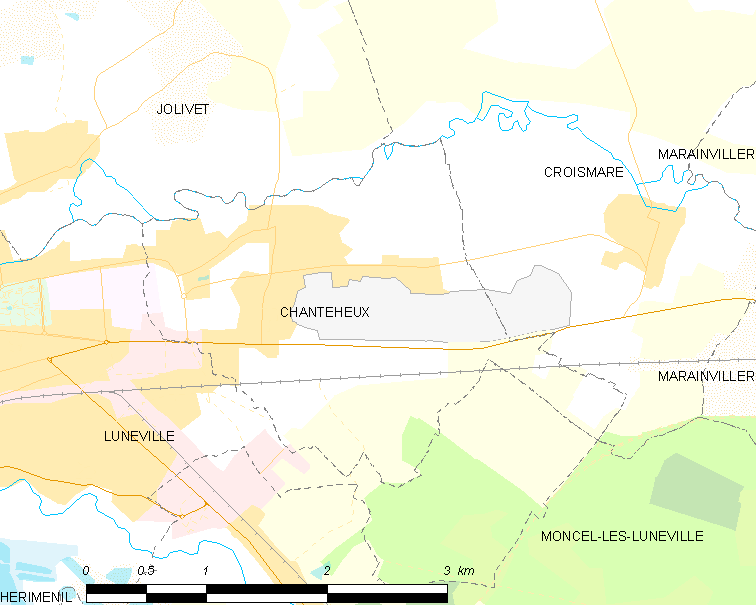
Mapof the commune

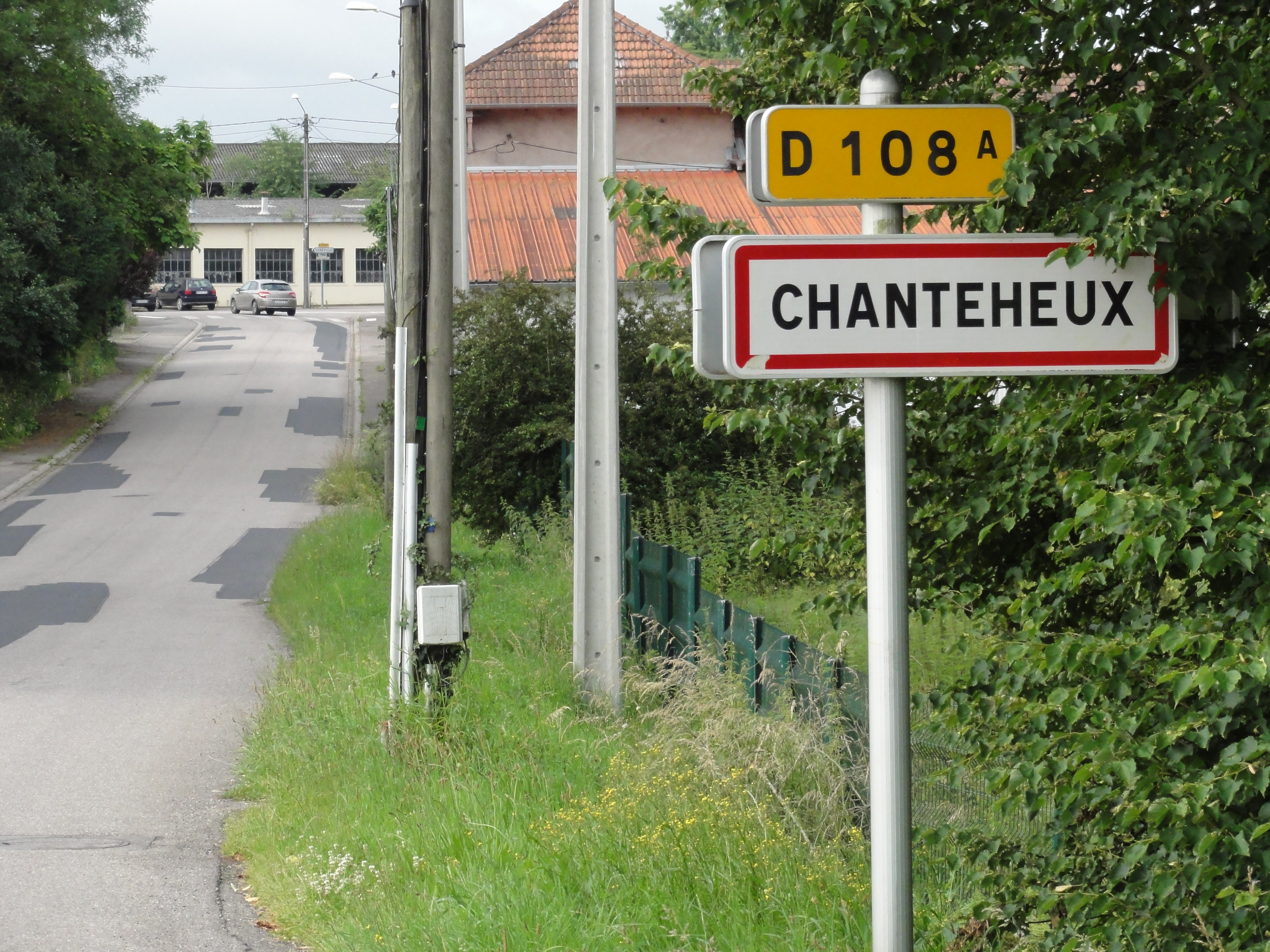
Chanteheux entry

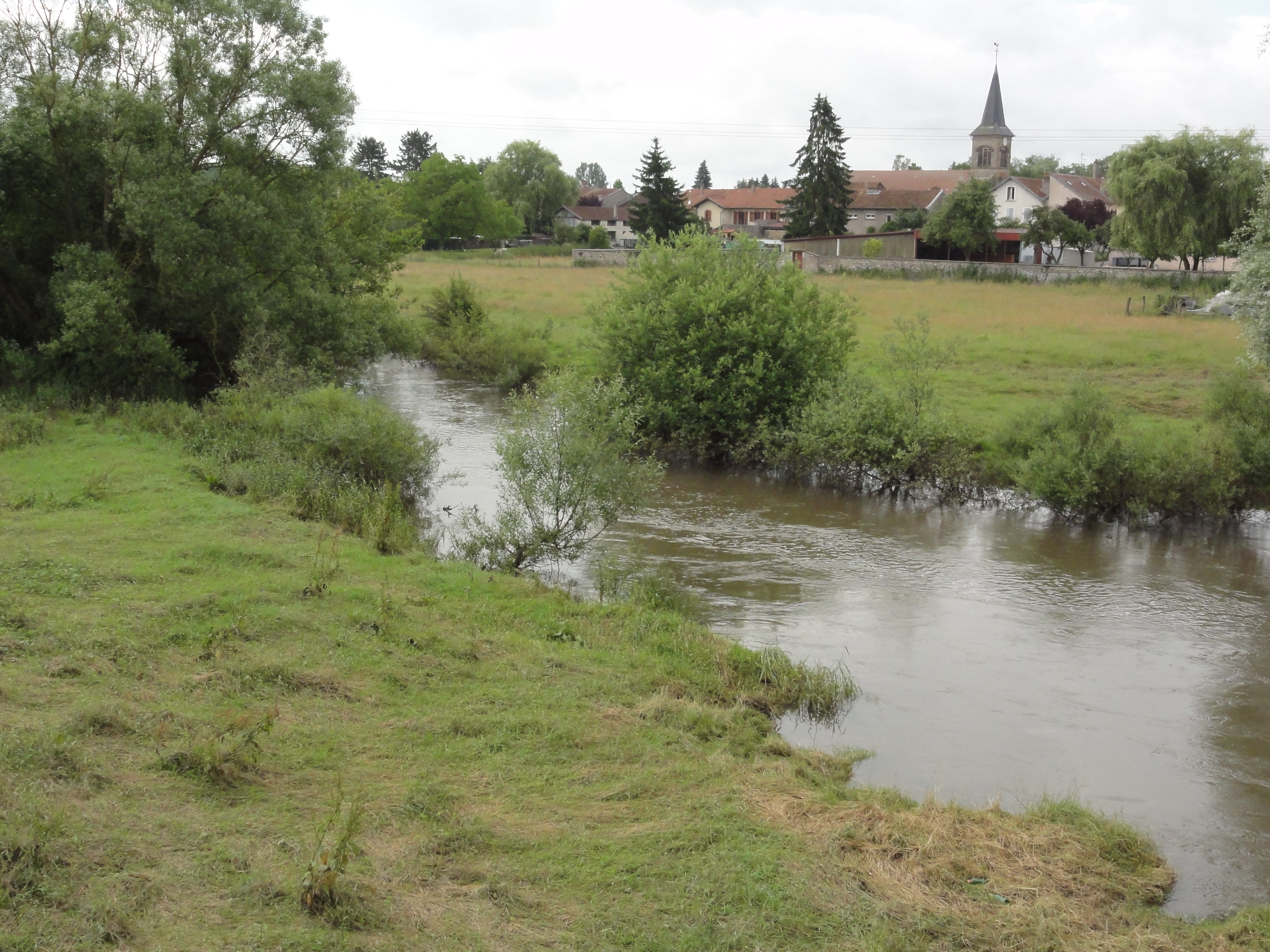
The Vezouze at Chanteheux

== Population ==
Historical population
| Year | Pop. | ±% p.a. |
|---|---|---|
| 1968 | 955 | — |
| 1975 | 1,272 | +4.18% |
| 1982 | 1,815 | +5.21% |
| 1990 | 1,746 | −0.48% |
| 1999 | 1,603 | −0.94% |
| 2007 | 1,812 | +1.54% |
| 2012 | 2,085 | +2.85% |
| 2017 | 2,143 | +0.55% |
| 2023 | 2,111 | −0.25% |
Source: INSEE

== Economy ==
Chanteheux has a bakery, a bar and a hairdressing salon in its center, and commercial zone in its periphery.

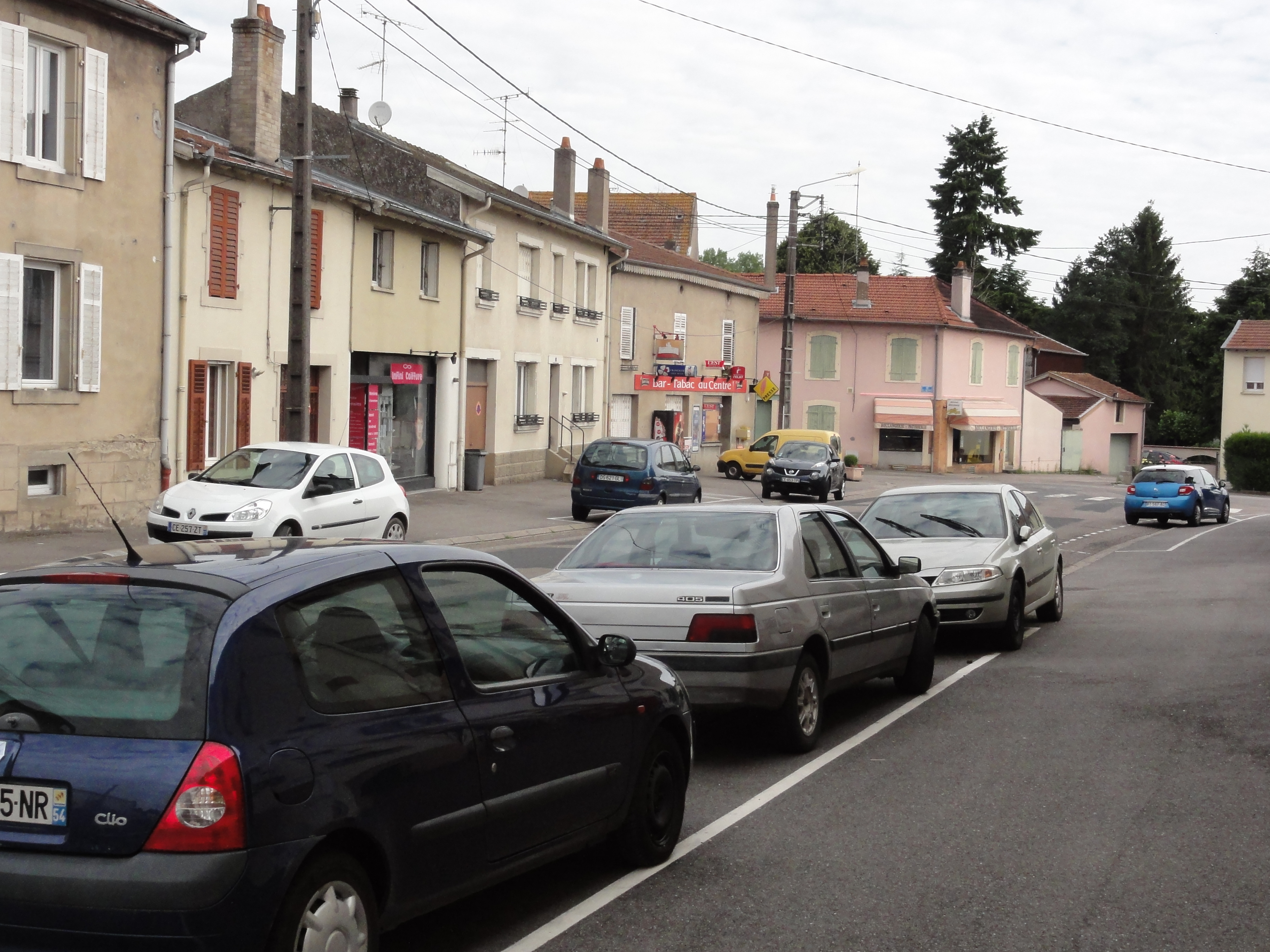
Chanteheux, main street and shops

== Community and sports life ==
Chanteheux has an amateur football club, the Amicale de Chanteheux.

The family association organize every year wine fair of Lunéville, a wood fair, and Christmas market, usually taking place at the local multifunctional room.

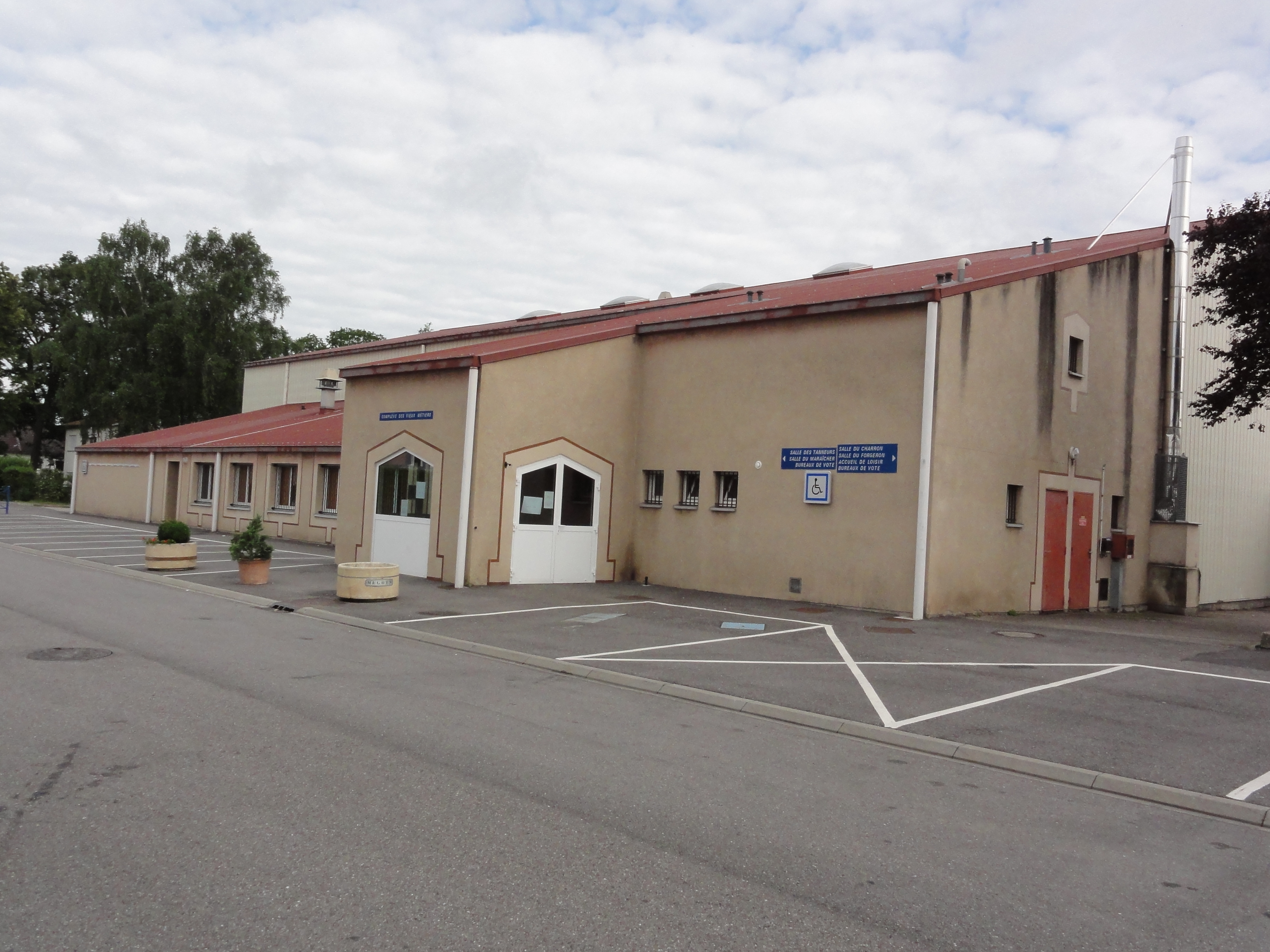
Multifunctional room of Chanteheux

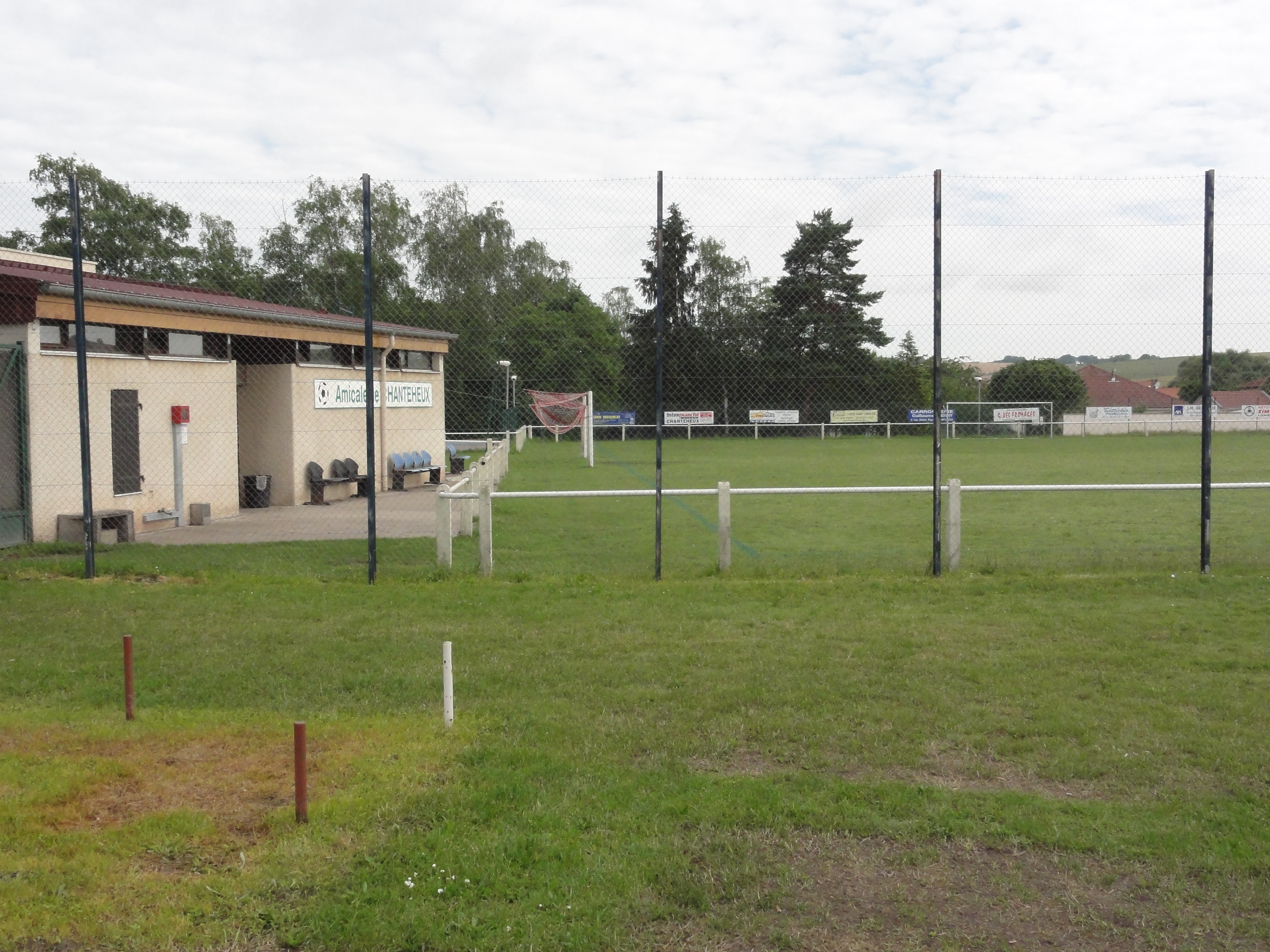
The stadium, home of the Amicale de Chanteheux

== Spots and monuments ==
- St Barthélemy Church
- War memorial
- Palace built in 1740 for the last duke of Lorraine Stanislaus I, lost just after his death
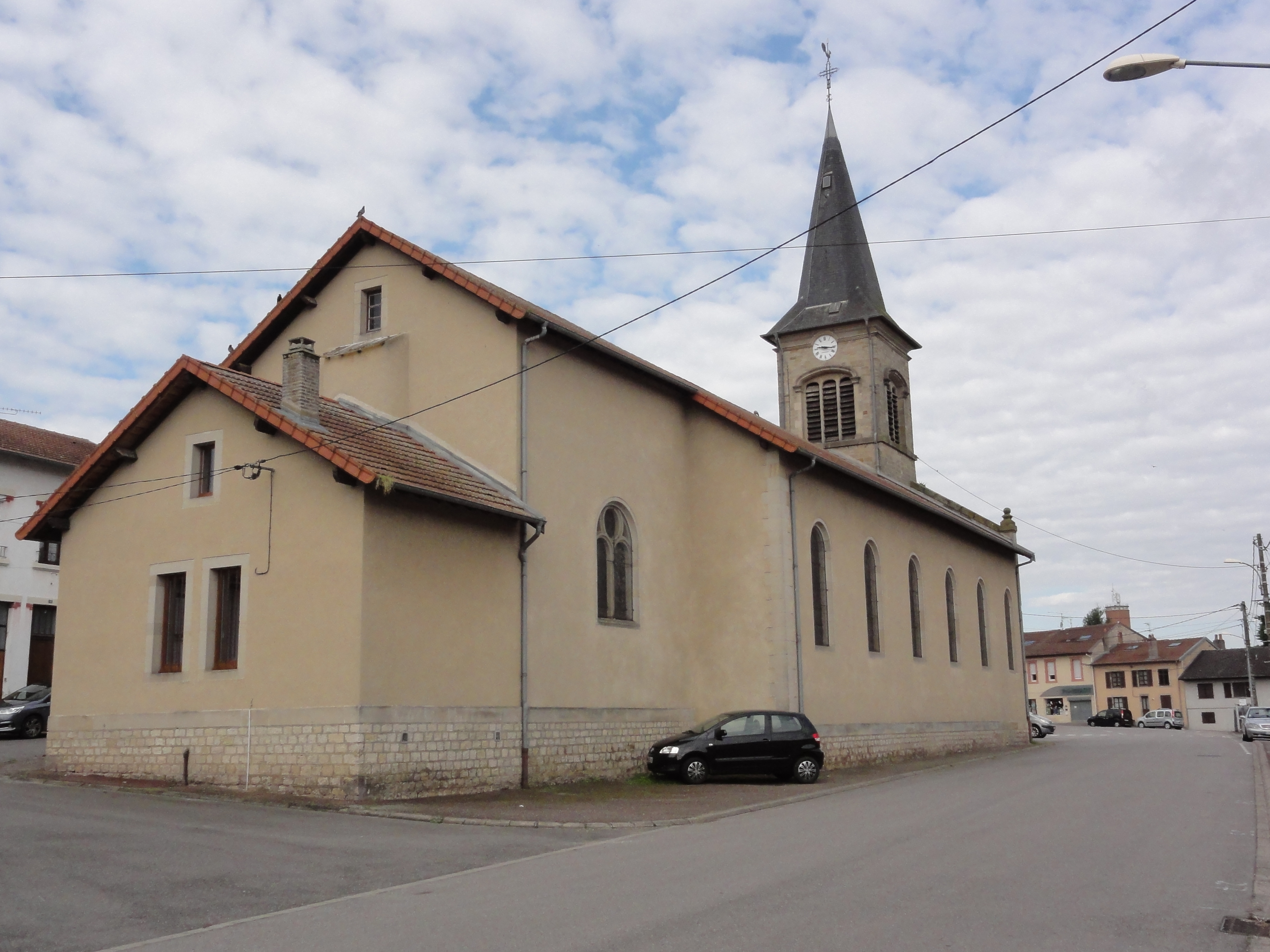
The church

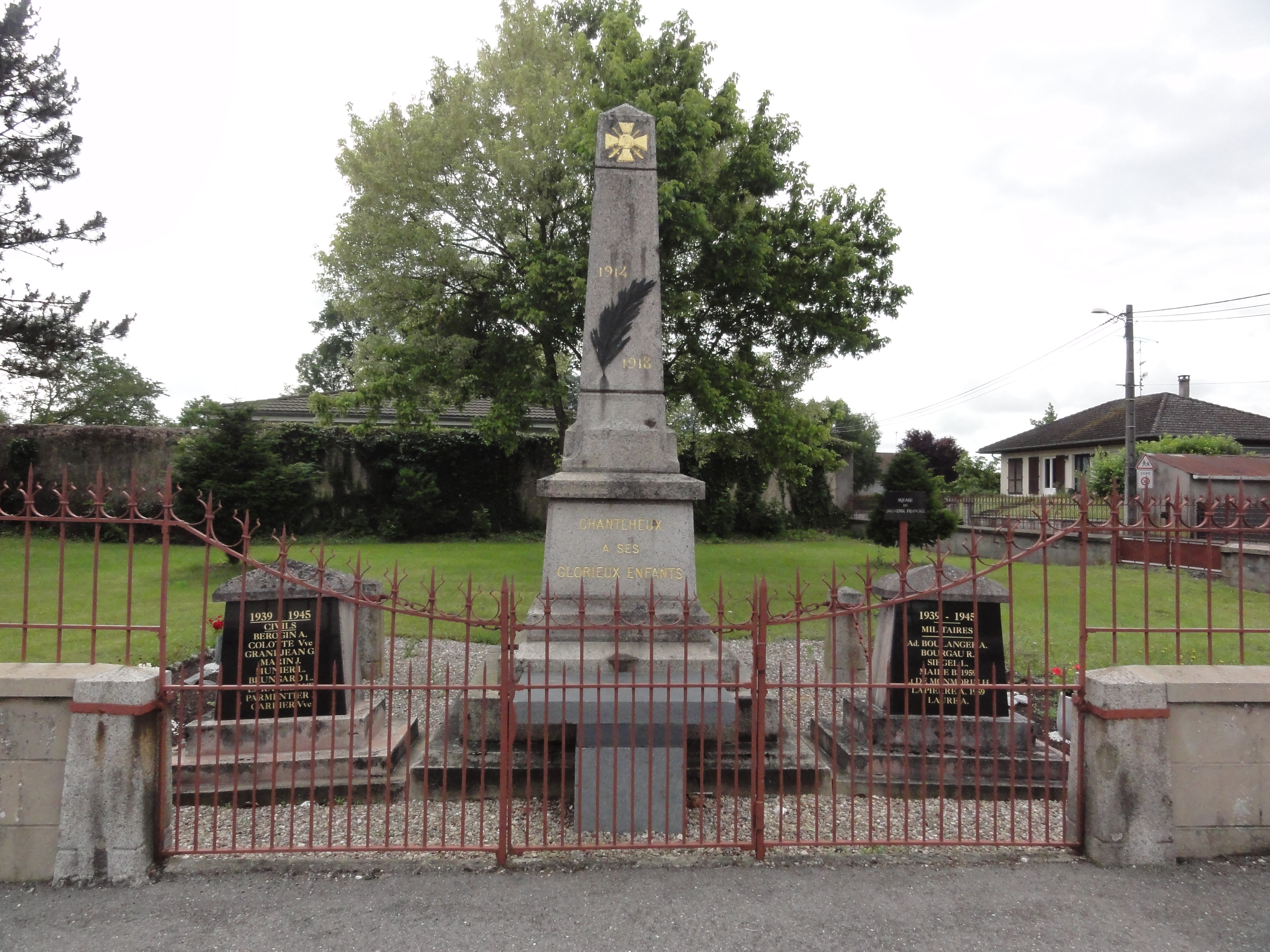
War memorial

== See also ==
- Communes of the Meurthe-et-Moselle department
