= Charles Louis Gratia =

French painter (1815–1911)

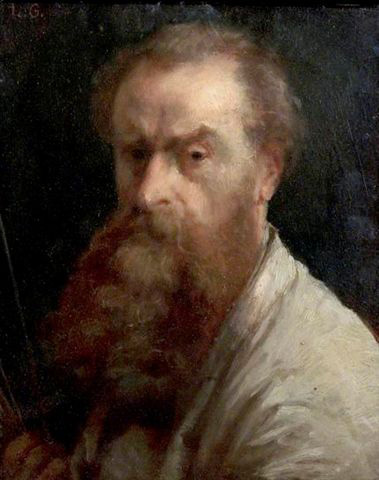
- Self portrait
- Born: 9 November 1815; Rambervillers, Vosges, France
- Died: 11 August 1911 (aged 95); Montlignon, Val-d'Oise, France
- Occupations: Painter and pastel artist

Charles Louis Gratia (9 November 1815 – 11 August 1911) was a French painter best known as a pastel artist. He became well known for his portraits during the July Monarchy (1830–48), but after the fall of the monarchy moved to London, England in 1850. After struggling at first, since he was foreign and pastel was an unfamiliar medium, he became recognized and made portraits of many prominent people including Queen Victoria. He returned to France in 1867, and continued to submit work to the Paris Salon until 1895. In his last years he was unable to compete with photography and with the Impressionist painters, and died in poverty.

== Early years ==
Charles Louis Gratia was born on 9 November 1815 in Rambervillers, Vosges. His father had settled there after serving in the navy during the First French Empire. He moved to Paris with his family when he was nine years old. His father obtained a position with the Chamber of Peers in the Luxembourg Palace, where he lived for several years. At the age of thirteen he became a pupil of the painter Henri Decaisne, who foresaw a brilliant future for him. Gratia painted in oils but specialized in pastels, in which he became a master, although he struggled to earn a living at first.

Gratia married when he was twenty, a move that he later said hindered his career. He exhibited for the first time in the Salon of 1837, when he was twenty-two. He was praised for his pastel portrait of the dramatist Prosper Gothi. He later exhibited portraits of Mayer Schnerb (1840); Esther de Beauregard (1841); La Boisgontier (1844); the Comte d'Eu and the Comtesse de Solms, born Laetitia Bonaparte. His 1844 full-length portrait of La Boisgontier in pastel on paper earned him his first prize, a 3rd medal. Two years later he won a 2nd medal. He associated with illustrious people of the time such as Victor Hugo, Alphonse de Lamartine and Jean-Louis-Ernest Meissonier, and was a friend of the actor and playwright Frédérick Lemaître. He made portraits of the children of King Louis Philippe I. In March 1843 Alphonse Brot wrote to Théophile Gautier asking him to take a look at his friend Gratia's Portrait d'Esther in the Salon. Mlle Esther was a variety theater artist.

== London ==
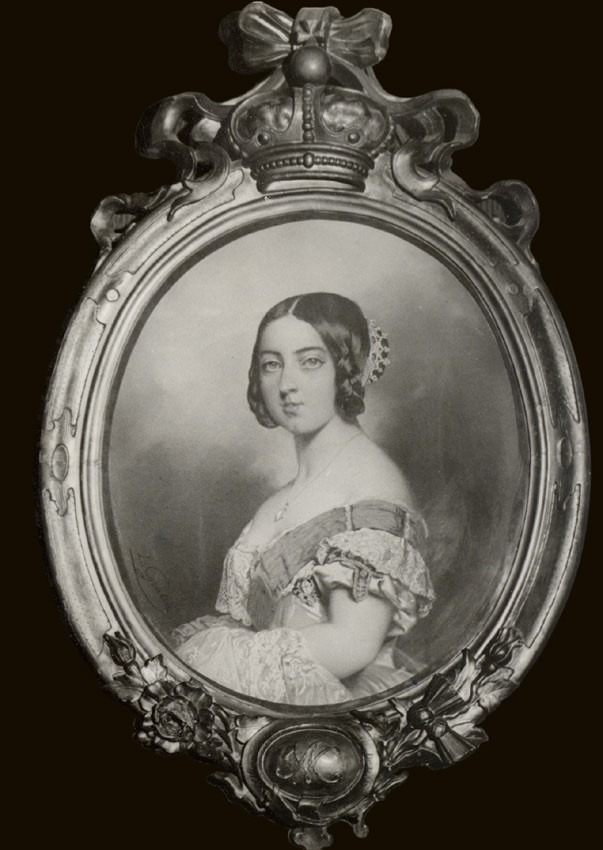
Queen Victoria by Gratia

After the French Revolution of 1848 Gratia was slightly compromised by his relationship with the former royal family. In 1850 he took his wife and three daughters to London, England accompanied by Frédérick Lemaître. He had difficulty obtaining commissions. For his first two years in England Gratia worked in a factory that made colored crayons and powdered paint. The factory owner, Newman, exhibited some of Gratia's work in the windows of his factory, and introduced him to people who helped him gain a reputation. He became known for his pastel work, an unusual medium in England at the time.

Gratia found a home in the palace of Cardinal Nicholas Wiseman in Fitzroy Square beside Regent's Park. He made a series of brilliant portraits of English notables including the Countess of Woldegrève; John Blackwood; Colonel Donalle; General Stewart; the sailors Edward Belcher and Aumaunnay, who had both sailed in search of Franklin; Miss Carrington; Lord Follet and Lord Willoughby, Lord Great Chamberlain of Queen Victoria. At Lord Willoughby's suggestion the queen agreed to sit for Gratia, but on condition that the portrait should not be exhibited and make English painters jealous. The queen sat several times accompanied by the Prince Consort. Later there was a dispute over payment for the oval frame of the portrait of the queen, which was kept by the frame maker.

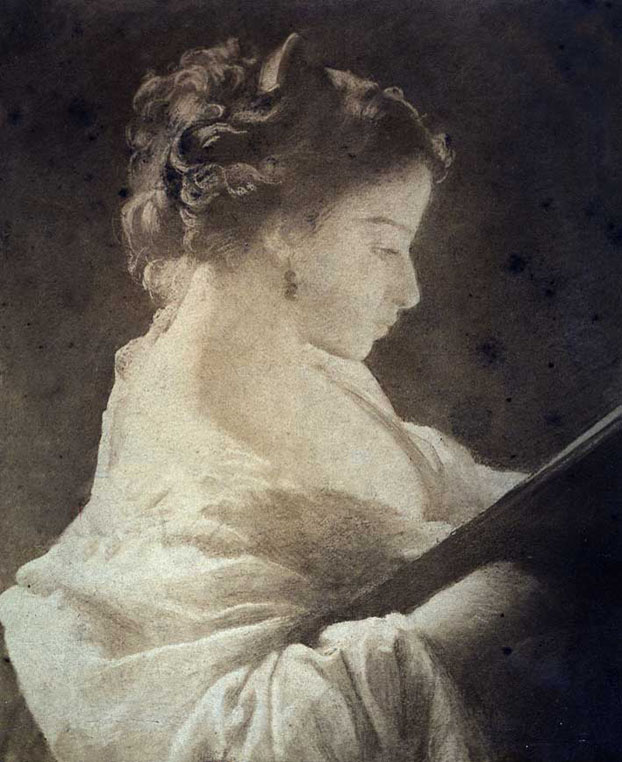
La liseuse (1864)

In addition to his portraits Gratia executed a number of pastels in exquisite taste during the seventeen years of his stay in London, some of which he send to the Salons of Paris between 1850 and 1867, when he returned to France. These included Man of arms; Turkish Corsair; Ecce Homo; Young Woman Reading; Lady Norreys; The Naturalist Verreaux. Young Woman Reading was a portrait of his 19-year-old daughter, Louise. It was later acquired by the Ministry of Fine Arts for the Élysée Palace in Paris.

== Later years ==
In 1867 Gratia returned to France after 17 years of absence and settled in Lunéville. Gratia fell out with his wife and they divorced. Louise, his second daughter, died soon after. Gratia thought she had died of grief. Later he remarried. He returned to work, and among those that he submitted to the Salons are the Comte and Comtesse de Bourcier; Baronne de Bouvet; Famille Gaillard; Madame Salomon de Rothschild and her daughter; Madame Achille Fould and two portraits of Monseigneur Lavigerie, Bishop of Nancy. He also made portraits of Général de Montaigu and Maréchal and Maréchale Bazaine, two excellent pieces that were burned during the Paris Commune in 1871. In 1870 the Académie de Stanislas in Nancy gave him a medal of honor.

Gratia continued to submit works to the Salon de Paris, including Monsieur et Madame Demasure (1881) and Monsieur et Madame Montigny (1884). After twenty years in Lunéville Gratin moved to nearby Nancy around 1887, to an apartment in the Stanislas district, overlooking the convent of the Assumption. Works submitted to the Salon included Self-portrait (1887), Portrait of my wife and child (1888), Singing Monk (1890), Madame Vernolle (1890); Madame Savoie (1891), Mademoiselle Schwartz (1891); Madame Montigny, painter (1892); Madame Cottereau (1892); Madame Husson (1894); Madame Hamel and Paul-Maurice, her son (1895). Apart from these portraits, he made various genre pieces such as Man of Arms, Young Woman playing with a parakeet, Bohemian woman, Harvest at Loulou, Young Woman with Lilacs and so on. In 1892 the L'Association des artistes lorrains was founded with Gratia as first president.

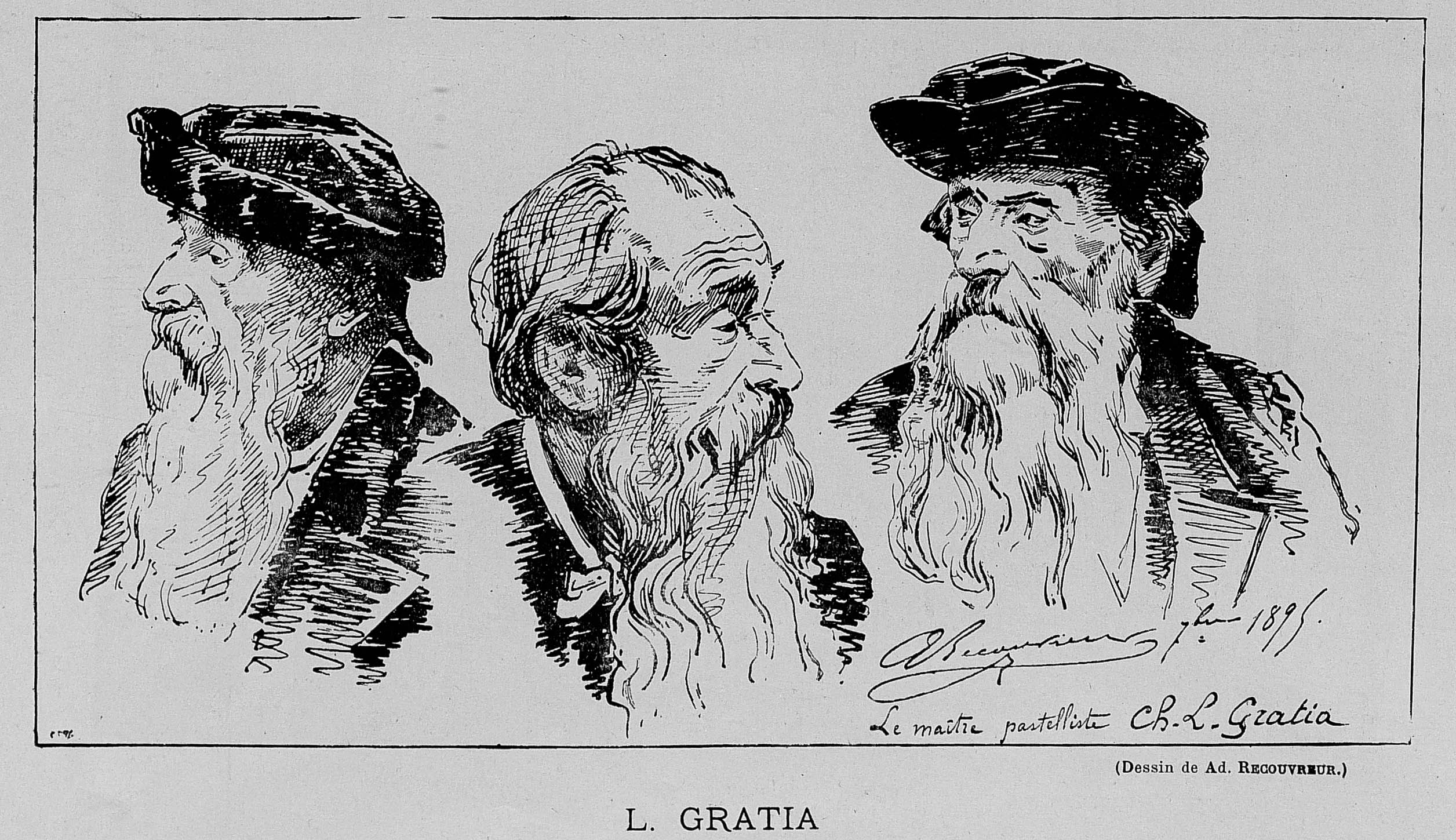
Extrait de La Lorraine artiste, année 1895, planches, 1895

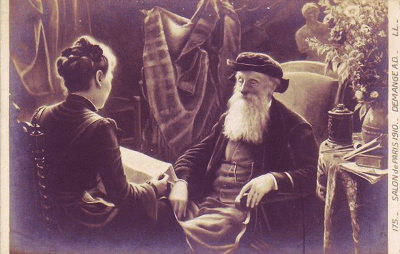
Louis Gratia, doyen des peintres à 94 ans by Adolphe Demange (1910)

In 1893 Gratia became very ill, and his family took him to Rouen, Normandy. He lived in Normandy for fifteen months, during which time he received no commissions and began to run through his small savings. He had two very young sons to support. He returned to Paris, where Raymond Poincaré, the Minister of Fine Arts, paid 2,000 francs to buy La Liseuse for the State. Soon after the Nancy Museum paid 1,500 francs for his portrait of his first wife. In Paris Gratia ran an employment office on the Rue Lamartine for seven years. In 1896, when aged 81, Gratia made one of his most impressive portraits, Thinking Monk a self-portrait. He no longer had a studio, but painted it in his small apartment on Avenue Laumière in Buttes-Chaumont.

Gratia was given a small pension for his services to art. In his last years he could no longer obtain commissions, since he had to compete with the Impressionist painters and with photography. He died in poverty at the age of 95 in Montlignon on 11 August 1911. His admirers erected a monument in his memory. His eldest son, Louis Émile, became a musician and composer. His second son, Maurice, became an actor.

== Work ==
In his treatise on pastels Gratia emphasizes the importance of the quality of the crayons, which he made himself to obtain tones that were both delicate and durable. He took great care over these pencils, sometimes using exotic pigments such as the pollen of Indian flowers or the wings of tropical butterflies. Charles Blanc wrote of Gratia, "He is unrivaled in his genre; he knows how to give it vigor of color, harmony, warmth of tone, united with freshness and velvety hues ... " An 1864 book on photography, then in its infancy, said that Gratia's works "supply the finest possible model for the imitation of the student" who was learning to color photographs using pastels.

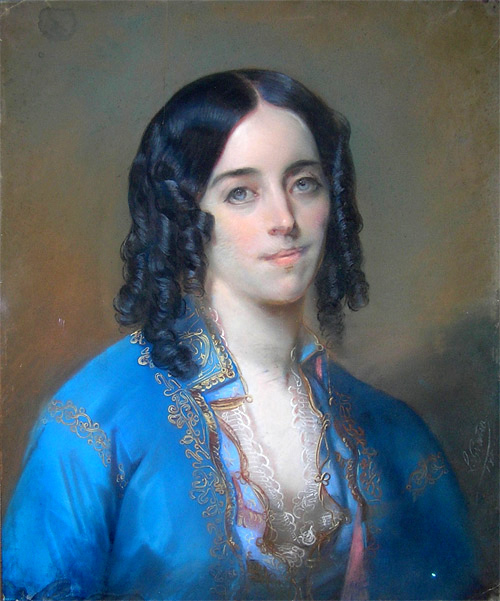
George Sand (c. 1835)

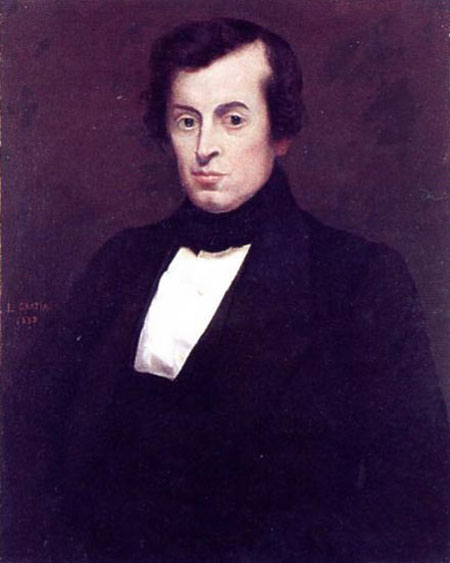
Frédéric Chopin (1838)

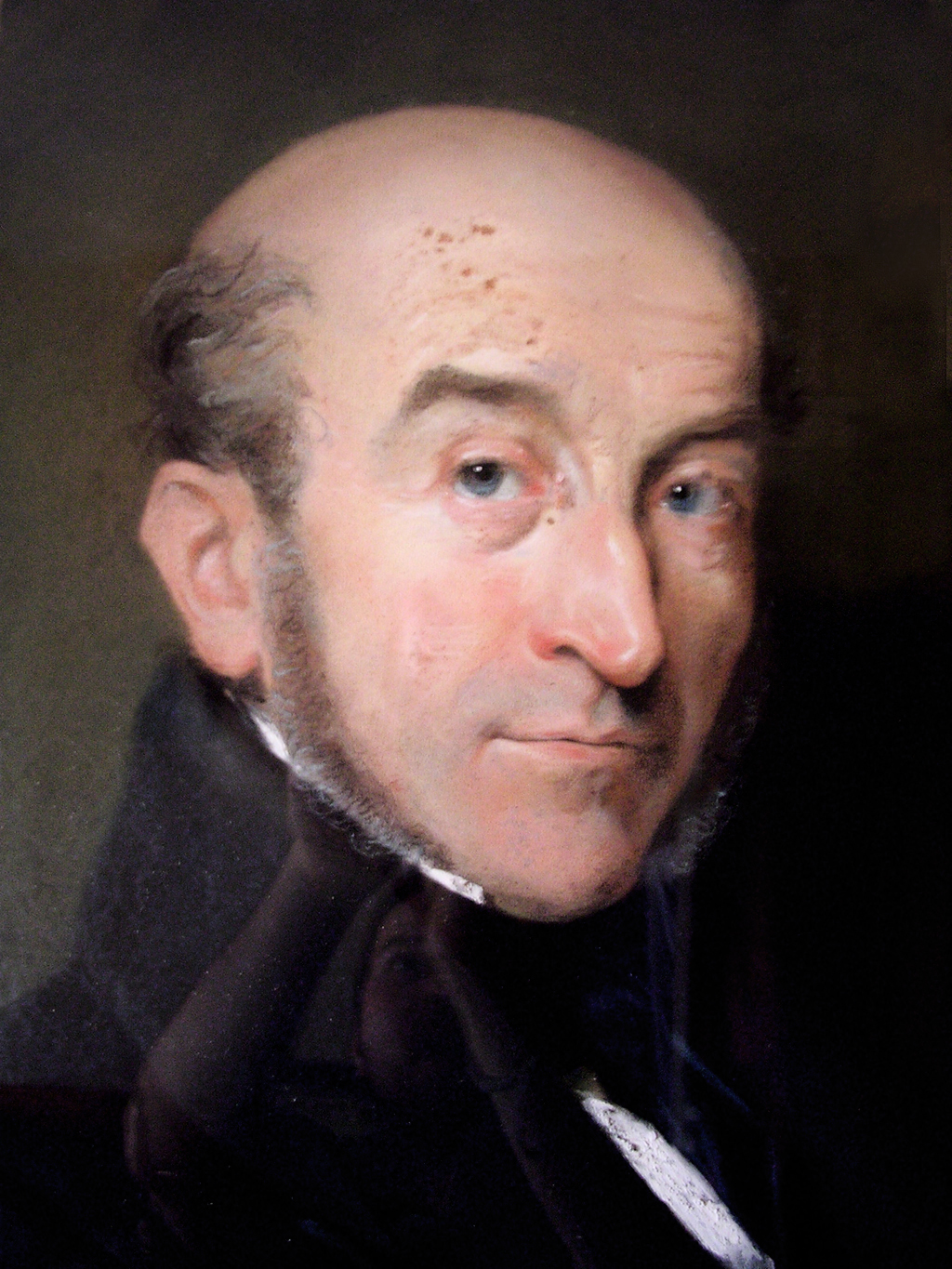
Nicolas Gratia, his father (1850)

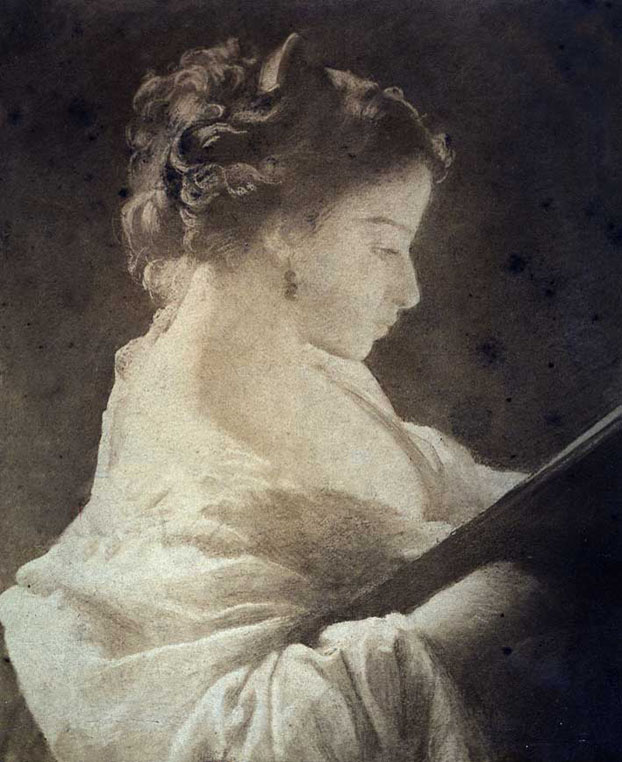
La Liseuse, his daughter Louise

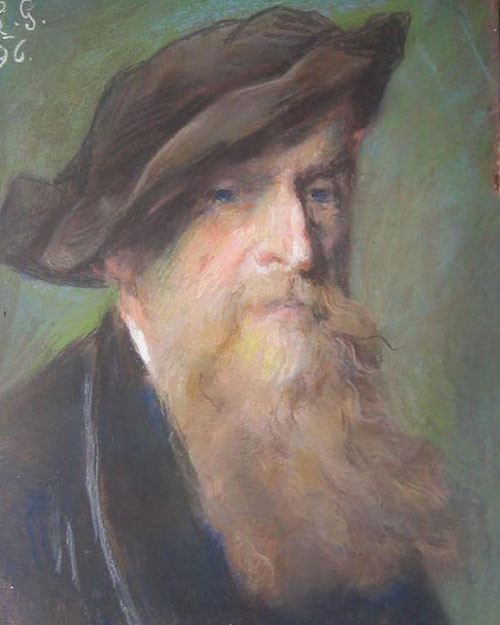
Self portrait (c. 1896)

== Publications ==
Publications include:

- Charles-Louis Gratia (1815-1911) (2014). Traité de la peinture au pastel.

== Sources ==
- "Charles Louis Gratia Biographie". Gratia.fr (in French).
- Gautier, Théophile (1985). Correspondance générale. Librairie Droz. ISBN 978-2-600-03619-1.
- Glaeser, Ernest (1878). "GRATIA (Charles-Louis)". Biographie nationale des contemporains (in French). Glaeser et cie.
- "Gratia, Charles Louis (1815-1911)". BnF (in French).
- Recouvreur, Adrien (1908). "Le Pastelliste Ch. L. Gratia". La revue Lorraine illustrée (in French).
- Root, Marcus Aurelius (1864). The Camera and the Pencil, Or, The Heliographic Art: Its Theory and Practice in All Its Various Branches, E.g., Daguerreotypy, Photography &c., Together with Its History in the United States and in Europe, Being at Once a Theoretical and a Practical Treatise, and Designed Alike, as a Text-book and a Hand-book, Illustrated with Fine Engravings on Steel and on Wood. M.A. Root.
