= Vezouze =

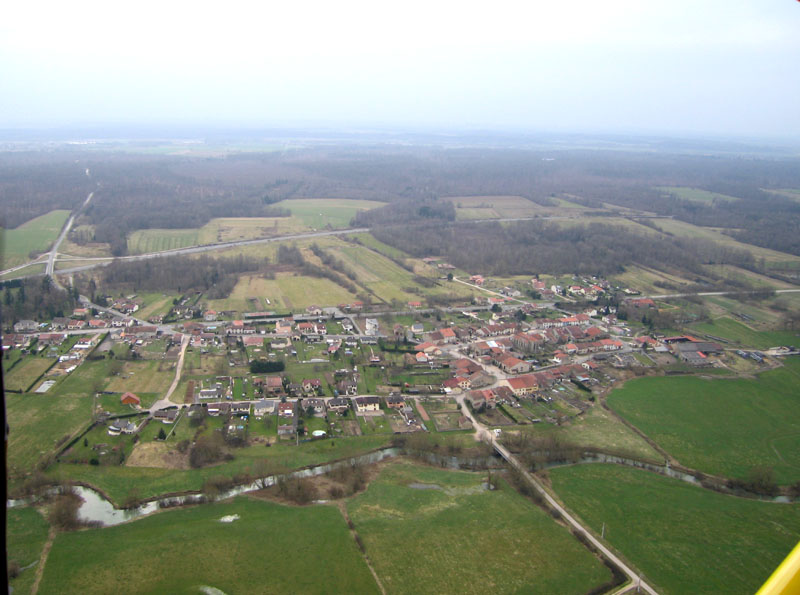
- The Vezouze at Thiébauménil

- Location within France Location within Grand Est

Location
- Country: France

Physical characteristics
- Source: Mont Donon
- Mouth: Meurthe
  - coordinates: 48°34′53″N 6°56′45″E
- Length: 75.1 km (46.7 mi)
- Basin size: 563 km^{2} (217 mi^{2})
- Discharge
  - average: 6.82 m^{3}/s (241 cu ft/s)

Basin features
- Progression: Meurthe→ Moselle→ Rhine→ North Sea

The Vezouze (French pronunciation: [vəzuz]) is a river in north-eastern France, right tributary to the river Meurthe. Its source is on Mont Donon in the Vosges département. It is 75 km (47 mi) long.

The river joins the Meurthe on the northern edge of Lunéville, France, the former capital of Lorraine that was strategically located there. In the 18th century the dukes of Lorraine channelled the flow of the water into a series of garden follies at the Château de Lunéville.

== Towns along the river ==
- Val-et-Châtillon
- Cirey-sur-Vezouze
- Blâmont
- Domèvre-sur-Vezouze
- Bénaménil
- Thiébauménil
- Marainviller
- Croismare
- Chanteheux
- Lunéville
