= Adolphe Demange =

French painter

- Born: 10 September 1857; Mignéville, Meurthe-et-Moselle, France
- Died: 1927 (aged 69–70)
- Occupation: Painter

Adolphe Demange (10 September 1857 – 1927) was a French painter best known for his portraits in oil. He was an official portrait painter during the French Third Republic.

== Life ==
Adolphe Demange was born on 10 September 1857, son of Jean-Baptiste Demange, a farmer of Merviller, Meurthe-et-Moselle and Marie Catherine Renaux of Mignéville, Meurthe-et-Moselle. Adolphe Demange was born in Mignéville. His parents had married on 1 April 1856. Adolphe was the eldest of seven children, whose birth certificates describe their father as a weaver. Demange studied under the pastel artist Charles Louis Gratia (1815–1911). (Note: Demange made a portrait of Gratia in 1910.) On 12 September 1888 he married Marie Célestine Merel (born 1862). Their daughter Suzanne was born in 1897.

Demange became an official portrait painter during the French Third Republic. He is best known for his portraits of friends and relatives, and portraits commissioned by notables such as that of Lucienne Noël de Gérardmer in 1894. Demange lived in Nancy in the last decade of the 19th century. He exhibited there in the Salon of the Société lorraine des amis des arts in 1892 and 1893. He was living in Asnières in 1898. After 1901 he had joined the Société des Artistes Français and was living in the 17th arrondissement in Paris. He exhibited at the Salon of the Société des Artistes français between 1896 and 1926. Demange also wrote poetry, collected in the 92-page book entitled Poésies gastronomiques et autres (1936).

Demange died in 1927.

== Works ==
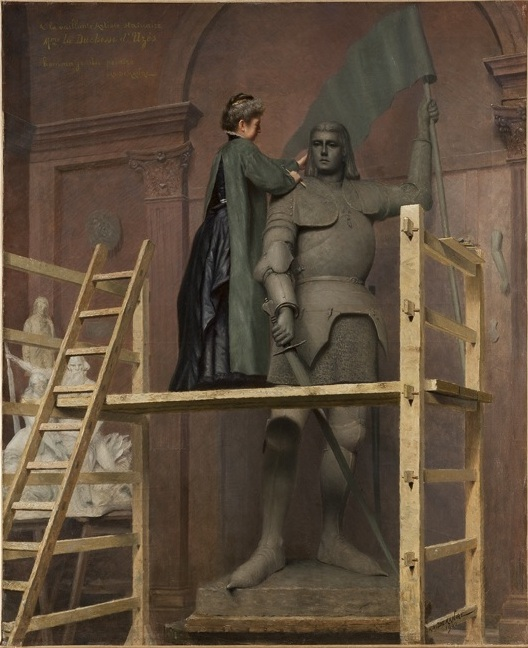
La Duchesse d'Uzès travaillant à la statue monumentale de Jeanne d'Arc, dans l'atelier de Falguière (1900; The Duchess of Uzès Working on the Monumental Statue of Joan of Arc, In the Studio of Falguière)

The Musée de la Comédie Française has Demange's painting Portrait de Madame Allan. One of his paintings is of Anne de Rochechouart de Mortemart, Duchesse d’Uzès working on a huge sculpture of Joan of Arc in the workshop of Alexandre Falguière in 1900. A partial list of works:

- Elégante sur les hauteurs présumées de Rouen (1893) – Oil on canvas (46 × 61 cm)
- La Duchesse d'Uzès travaillant à la statue monumentale de Jeanne d'Arc, dans l'atelier de Falguière (1900) – Oil on canvas (100 × 81 cm)
- Place de la Concorde (1900) – Oil on canvas (33 × 47 cm)
- Portrait d'homme (1901) – Pastel on paper (63 × 52 cm)
- Portrait d'une fillette au col blanc (1910) – Pastel on paper (61 × 50 cm)
- Portrait d'une dame de qualité (1911) – Pastel on paper (65 × 54 cm)
- Portrait de Madame de Montcloux, d'après L.M Van Loo (1911) – Oil on canvas (144 × 112.0 cm)
- Paris, bords de Seine (1918) – Oil on panel (26 × 34 cm)
- Mauvaise joueuse – Oil on canvas (31 × 39.5 cm)
- Couture dans la lumière du jour – Oil on panel (35 × 27 cm)
- Village lorrain – Oil on canvas (38 × 46 cm)
- Deux femmes près d'un arbre – Oil on panel (46 × 38 cm)

== Sources ==
- "Adolphe Demange". Art Lorrain.
- "Adolphe Demange (1857–1928)". Blâmont.info.
- "Adolphe DEMANGE Poésies gastronomiques et autres". Livre-Rare-Book.
- "Anne-Marie Loth". Chapitre Douze.
- Bontemps, Daniel; Bontemps-Litique, Martine (1999). Les Noms de Famille En Lorraine. Archives & Culture. ISBN 978-2-911665-20-2.
- "Demange, Adolphe (French artist, 1857–1927)". VIAF.
- Jean Marie Auguste LOTH (2015). "Adolphe DEMANGE".
- "The Duchesse Anne d'Uzès working on a sculpture of Jeanne d'Arc". Carlton Hobbs.
