= Bichat (disambiguation) =

Xavier Bichat (1771–1802) was a French anatomist and pathologist, known as the father of modern histology.

Bichat may also refer to:

- Ernest Bichat (1845–1905), French physicist
- Bichat's fat pad
- Bichat–Claude Bernard Hospital
- 250606 Bichat, minor planet
