= Muller Frères =

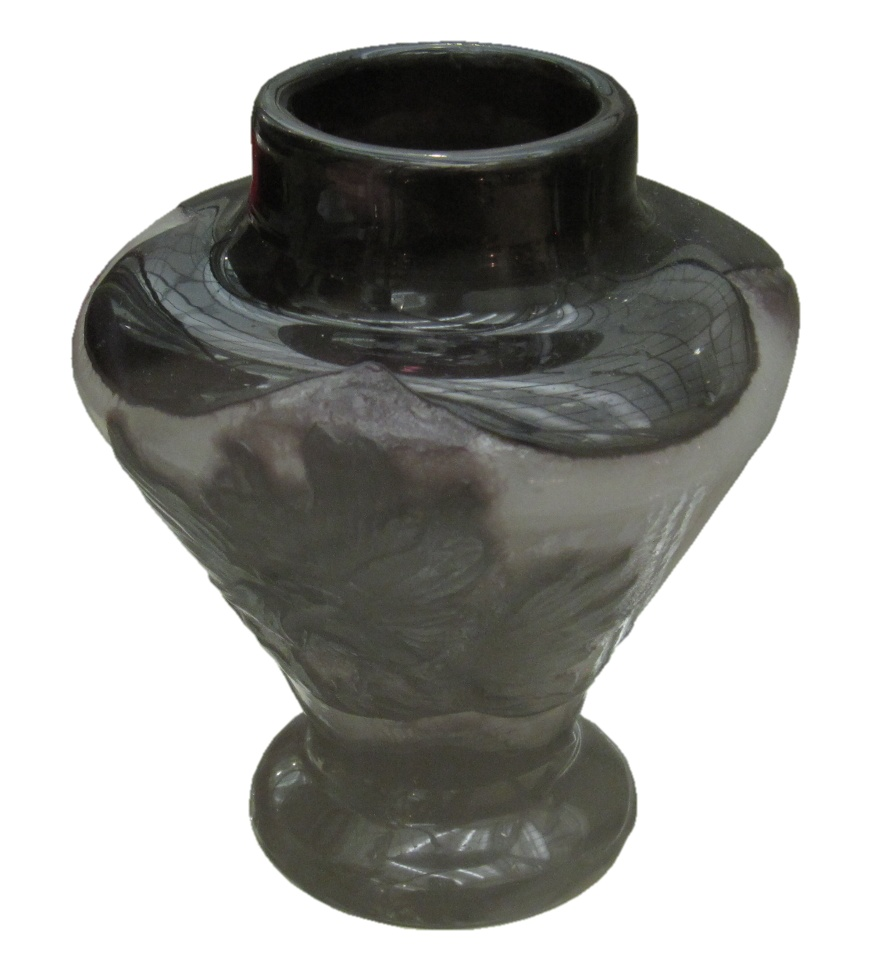
Small glass vase by Muller frères, around 1900

Muller Frères were French glassmakers located in Lunéville, France. They were renowned for producing Art Nouveau glassworks such as vases and lampshades.

The Muller family originally came from Alsace. Some members of the family worked together with Émile Gallé before starting their own business.
