= Domèvre-sur-Vezouze =

- Commune
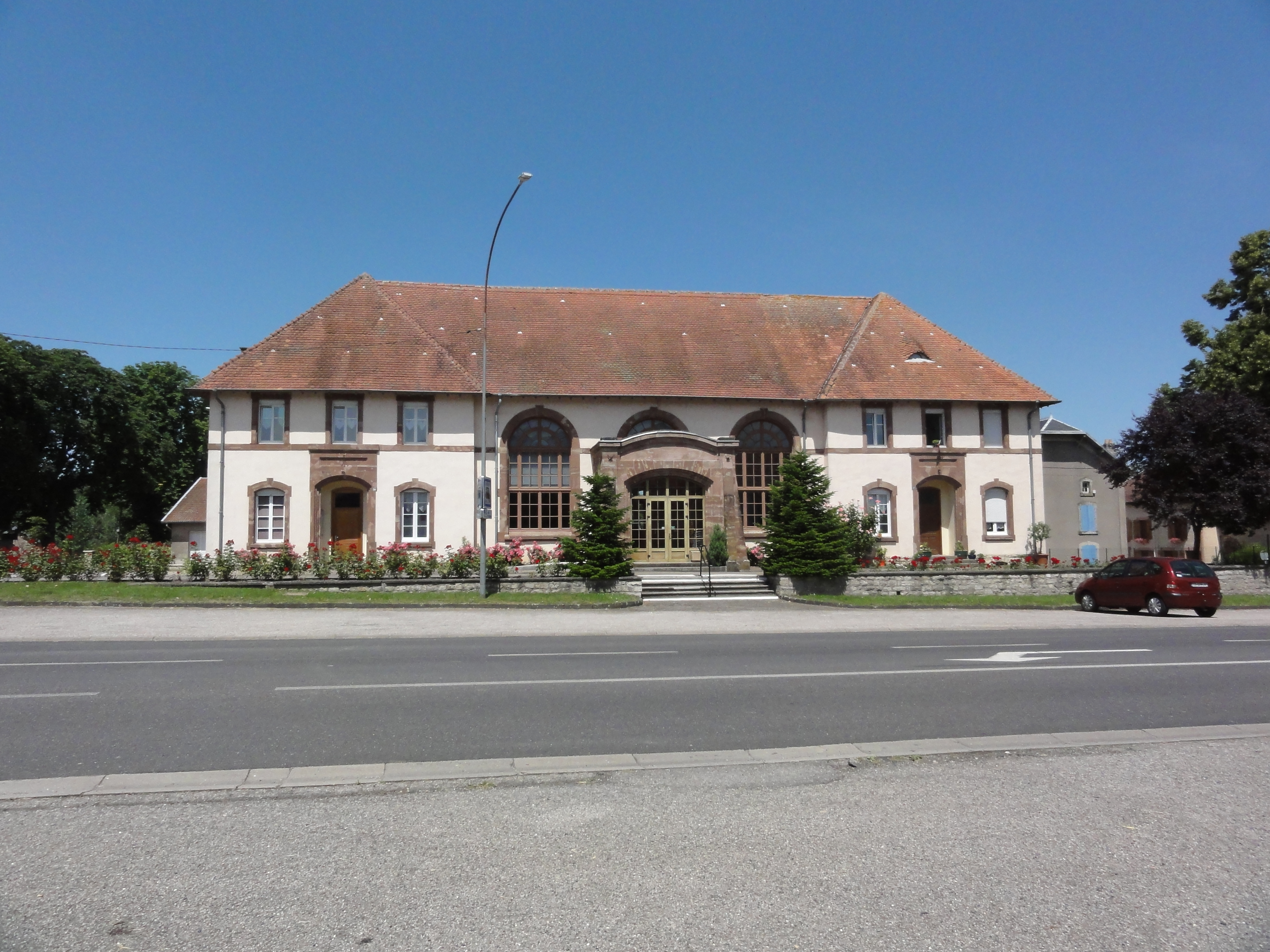
- The town hall in Domèvre-sur-Vezouze

- Coat of arms
- Location of Domèvre-sur-Vezouze
- Location within France Location within Grand Est
- Coordinates: 48°33′44″N 6°48′24″E
- Country: France
- Region: Grand Est
- Department: Meurthe-et-Moselle
- Arrondissement: Lunéville
- Canton: Baccarat

Government
  - Mayor (2020–2026): Michel César
- Area^{1}: 14.78 km^{2} (5.71 sq mi)
- Elevation: 267 m (876 ft)
- Highest elevation: 317 m (1,040 ft)
- Lowest elevation: 246 m (807 ft)
- Population (2023): 314
  - Density: 21.2/km^{2} (55.0/sq mi)
- Time zone: UTC+01:00 (CET)
  - Summer (DST): UTC+02:00 (CEST)
- INSEE/Postal code: 54161 /54450
- ^{1} French Land Register data, which excludes lakes, ponds, glaciers > 1 km^{2} (0.386 sq mi or 247 acres) and river estuaries.

Domèvre-sur-Vezouze (French pronunciation: [dɔmɛvʁ syʁ vəzuz], literally Domèvre on Vezouze) is a commune in the Meurthe-et-Moselle department in north-eastern France.

== See also ==
- Communes of the Meurthe-et-Moselle department
