= Louis Émile Gratia =

French music educator 1878-1962

Louis Émile Georges Gratia (17 September 1878 – 31 October 1962) was a French musician, composer, musicologist, musical editor and arranger.

== Life ==
Gratia was born in Lunéville, (Meurthe-et-Moselle). His father was the painter Charles Louis Gratia (1815–1911) who, after his return to France in 1867, settled for a time in Lunéville and remarried.

Gratia specialized in music education, making editions of piano music and arrangements for effective piano pedagogy and acquisition of music theory. His work won the attention and support of important French musicians and teachers like organist Charles-Marie Widor and pianist Isidor Philipp.

He died in Clichy (Hauts-de-Seine), in the suburbs of Paris.

== Works ==
=== Writings ===
- Étude du piano: Comment réaliser un maximum de progrès à l’aide d'un minimum de travail (Piano study: how to make the most progress with the least work). Preface by Charles-Marie Widor (Paris: Delagrave 1914).
- Instruments de musique du XXe siècle: Les conséquences pédagogiques, professionnelles, sociales, artistiques (Musical instruments of the 20th century; pedagogical, professional, social, and artistic consequences) (Paris: Heugel, 1931).
- Répertoire pratique du pianiste: Précedé de conseils préliminaires pour apprendre les notes et le solfège, aider au choix et à l'étude des morceaux : accompagné de 20 exemples musicaux (How a pianist should practice: with preliminary advice for learning the notes and music theory, to help in the choice and study of pieces, accompanied by 20 musical examples). Preface by Isidor Philipp (Paris: Delagrave, 1931).

=== Compositions ===
- L'Harmonium pour tous (23 pieces)
- Abrégé des grands maîtres recueil (2 volumes with 20 pieces each)
- Danse de la fée Dragée. Extrait simplifié du ballet de Casse-Noisette de Tschaïkowsky (Dance of the sugar plum fairy, simplified selection of Tchaikovsky's ballet The Nutcracker) (Paris: L. Philippo, 1952).
- Valse des fleurs. Extrait simplifié du ballet de Casse-Noisette de Tschaïkowsky (Waltz of the flowers, simplified selection from Tchaikovsky's ballet The Nutcracker) (Paris: L. Philippo, 1952).
