= Cirey-sur-Vezouze =

- Commune
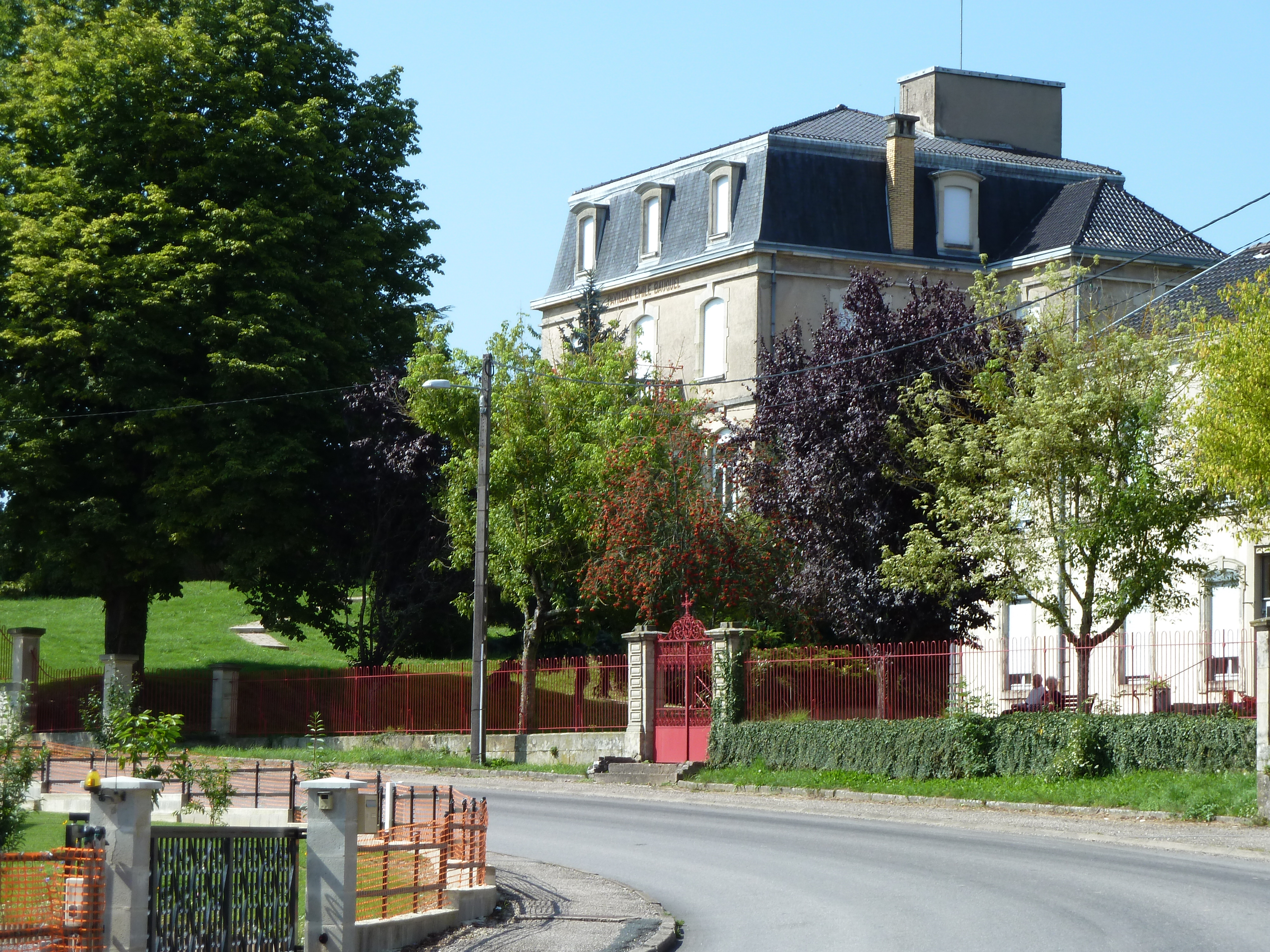
- The Pavillon Emile Bauquel in Cirey-sur-Vezouze

- Coat of arms
- Location of Cirey-sur-Vezouze
- Location within France Location within Grand Est
- Coordinates: 48°35′N 6°57′E
- Country: France
- Region: Grand Est
- Department: Meurthe-et-Moselle
- Arrondissement: Lunéville
- Canton: Baccarat
- Intercommunality: CC de Vezouze en Piémont

Government
  - Mayor (2021–2026): Jean-Claude Bazin
- Area^{1}: 16.39 km^{2} (6.33 sq mi)
- Elevation: 260 m (850 ft)
- Highest elevation: 393 m (1,289 ft)
- Lowest elevation: 273 m (896 ft)
- Population (2023): 1,555
  - Density: 94.87/km^{2} (245.7/sq mi)
- Time zone: UTC+01:00 (CET)
  - Summer (DST): UTC+02:00 (CEST)
- INSEE/Postal code: 54129 /54480
- ^{1} French Land Register data, which excludes lakes, ponds, glaciers > 1 km^{2} (0.386 sq mi or 247 acres) and river estuaries.

Cirey-sur-Vezouze (French pronunciation: [siʁɛ syʁ vəzuz], literally Cirey on Vezouze) is a commune in the Meurthe-et-Moselle department in north-eastern France.

== History ==
During the Second World War, a Royal Canadian Air Force Lancaster Bomber was forced to crash land near Cirey-sur-Vezouze after a bombing raid on Stuttgart. Three of the crew were killed in the crash landing with a further two airmen (including Flight Sergeant Fordham) being apprehended, taken into the nearby forest and summarily executed by German forces. Three war graves lay in Cirey-sur-Vezouze's graveyard, with the shallow graves in the forest being discovered and exhumed by a team led by Major Eric Barksworth.

== See also ==
- Communes of the Meurthe-et-Moselle department
