= Mignéville =

- Commune
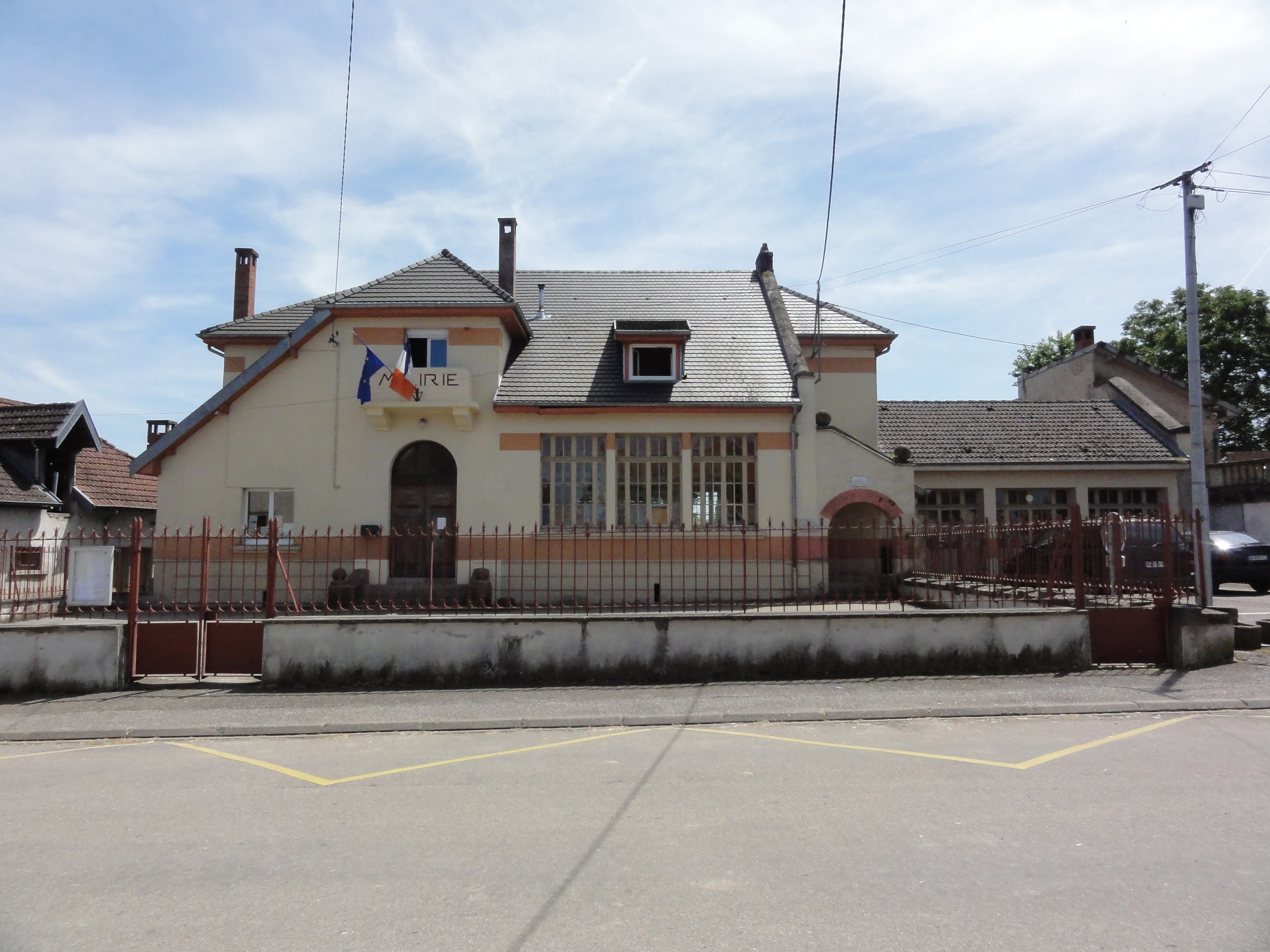
- The town hall and school in Mignéville

- Coat of arms
- Location of Mignéville
- Location within France Location within Grand Est
- Coordinates: 48°31′58″N 6°46′46″E
- Country: France
- Region: Grand Est
- Department: Meurthe-et-Moselle
- Arrondissement: Lunéville
- Canton: Baccarat

Government
  - Mayor (2020–2026): Denis Boulanger
- Area^{1}: 6.44 km^{2} (2.49 sq mi)
- Elevation: 260 m (850 ft)
- Highest elevation: 307 m (1,007 ft)
- Lowest elevation: 252 m (827 ft)
- Population (2023): 170
  - Density: 26/km^{2} (68/sq mi)
- Time zone: UTC+01:00 (CET)
  - Summer (DST): UTC+02:00 (CEST)
- INSEE/Postal code: 54368 /54540
- ^{1} French Land Register data, which excludes lakes, ponds, glaciers > 1 km^{2} (0.386 sq mi or 247 acres) and river estuaries.

Mignéville (French pronunciation: [miɲevil]) is a commune in the Meurthe-et-Moselle department in northeastern France. As of 2023, the population of the commune was 170.

== See also ==
- Communes of the Meurthe-et-Moselle department
