= Ernest Bichat =

French physicist (1845–1905)

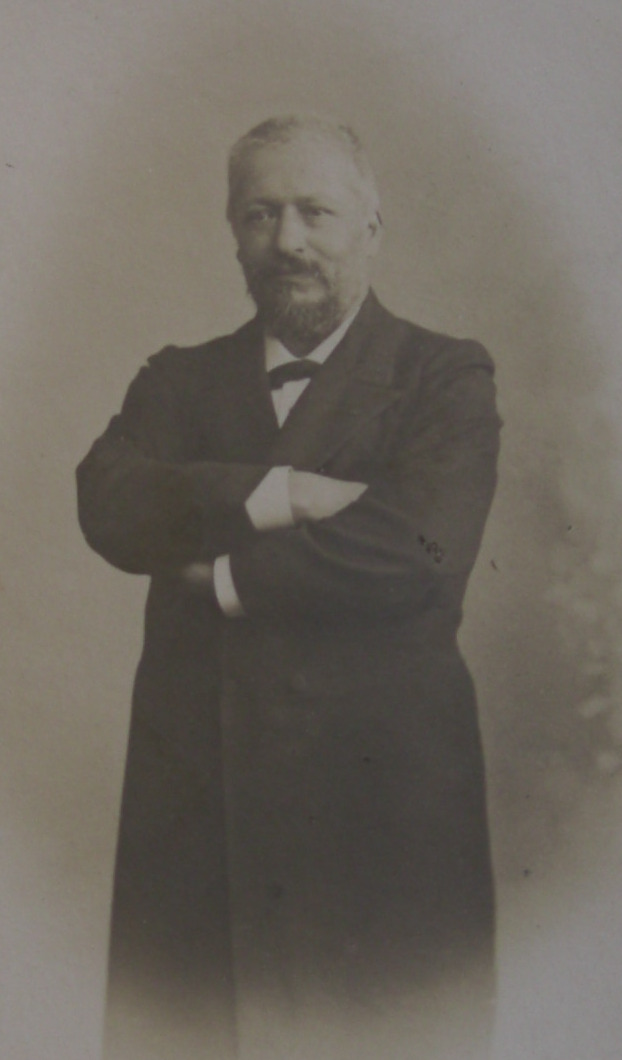
- Ernest Bichat (1845 - 1905)
- Born: Ernest-Adolphe Bichat; September 17, 1845; Lunéville, France
- Died: July 26, 1905 (aged 59); Nancy, France
- Education: École Normale Supérieure (1866-1869)
- Awards: Knight of the Legion of Honour (1892); Officer of the Legion of Honour (1900)
- Scientific career
- Fields: Physics
- Workplaces: Faculty of Science, Nancy
- Doctoral advisor: Augustin Bertin-Mourot

Signature
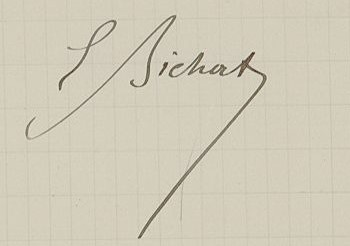

Ernest-Adolphe Bichat, often called Ernest Bichat (French: [ɛʁnɛst biʃa]; born on September 17, 1845 in Lunéville and died on July 26, 1905 (aged 59) in Nancy), was a French physicist, member of the Higher Council of Public Instruction, president of the General Council of Meurthe-et-Moselle, dean of the Faculty of Sciences, and correspondent of the institute.

== Biography ==
Ernest-Adolphe Bichat was born on September 17, 1845 in Lunéville, the son of Ernest Bichat, a gardener, and Barbe Luce Jeanroy, his wife.

Ernest Bichat proved to be a brilliant student, first at the school in Flainval, then at the college in Lunéville. He then prepared for his baccalaureate in Nancy, before being admitted to the École Normale Supérieure in 1866.

He married, on 31. of July 1872. at the town hall of the fifth arrondissement of Paris, Marie Eugénie Hélène Bertin-Mourot, the daughter of his thesis supervisor. The couple's witnesses were chemist Henri Sainte-Claire Deville, philosopher Ernest Bersot, former Minister of Public Instruction Victor Duruy, all three from the Institut de France, and Louis Pasteur. The couple had three children:

- Albert, born in 1873 in Paris, a military chief of staff who died in the Somme in 1916, knight of the Legion of Honour.
- Henry, born in 1877 in Nancy, a doctor, mayor of Lunéville, general councillor of Meurthe-et-Moselle, officer of the Legion of Honour.
- Hélène-Jeanne, born in 1879 in Nancy, a military officer's wife who, after being widowed, became the Superior of the Hospice des Dames du Calvaire in Paris, knight of the Legion of Honour.

In 1889, along with other personalities from Nancy, Bichat participated in the creation of L'Est républicain, a republican newspaper to combat Boulangism. An uncontested leader of the opportunist anti-clerical party of the Lunéville district, Ernest-Adolphe Bichat later evolved in the opposite direction and died piously in Nancy on July 26, 1905 (aged 59).

Municipal councillor of Nancy from 1886 to 1892, he was president of the General Council of Meurthe-et-Moselle from 1892 to 1895, where he had been a councillor since 1880.

An Officer of Public Instruction, he was a member of the Higher Council of Public Instruction for many years, then appointed correspondent of the Academy of Sciences for the general physics section in 1893 until his death.

Knighted in 1892, he was promoted to Officer of the Legion of Honour in 1900.

=== Scientific career ===
Thanks to the gradual opening of education provided by the Republic, he accessed higher education despite coming from a modest background. After obtaining his baccalaureate in Sciences in 1863, he entered the special mathematics class at the Lycée de Nancy with his classmate Gaston Floquet, a future mathematician, and they both took chemistry courses from Camille Forthomme whom they later encountered as a collaborator at the faculty of sciences. He had to give up entering the Polytechnique for health reasons and instead entered the École Normale Supérieure in the Science section in 1866 where Pierre Auguste Bertin directed him towards physics. In 1869, he was ranked first in the agrégation in physical sciences competition. He frequented the Bertin-Mourot family and in 1872 married his daughter Marie Eugénie Hélène.

From 1869 to 1871, he taught physics and chemistry in Angoulême at the high school. From 1871 to 1873, he taught in Bourges. He then obtained a position as a lecturer at the faculty of sciences of Nancy, where he taught electricity, magnetism, optics, and acoustics.

Appointed professor in 1877, then dean of the Faculty of Sciences in 1890, he directed this faculty until 1905. He participated in the creation of the university of Nancy in 1902, alongside professors Paul-Émile Appell and Lucien Cuénot. Very attached to the principles of laicity and the dissemination of knowledge, he set up free public courses on new electricity developments, the relationship between electricity and light, and X-rays, including scientific demonstrations.

In 1904, he chaired the 8th congress of the French Society of Physics organized in Nancy, notably in the premises of the Institut d'électrotechnique Nancy (future ENSIEG) where he had collaborated with Arthur Moritz Schoenflies.

A bridge in Nancy is named in his honor.
