= Marainviller =

- Commune
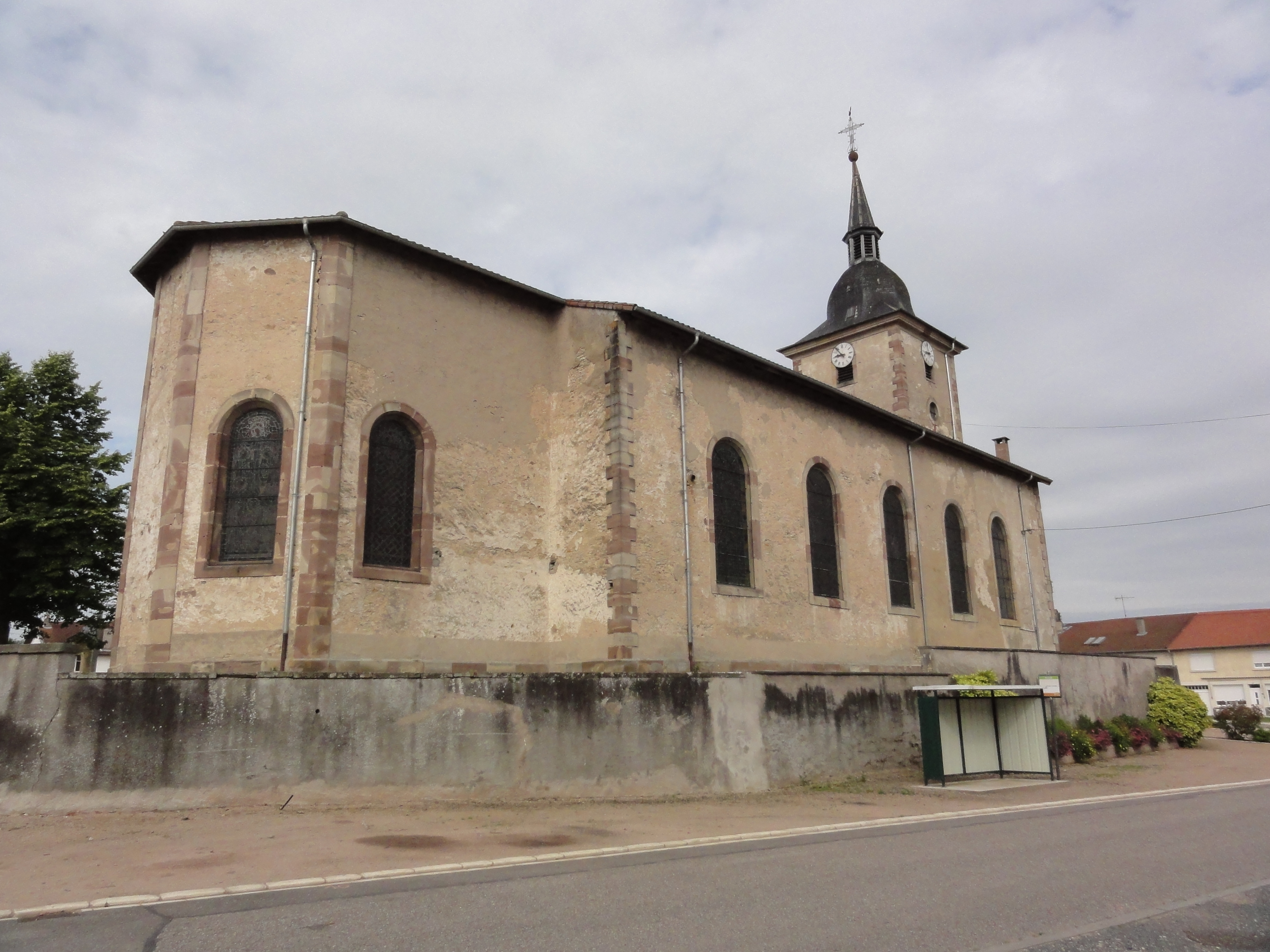
- The church in Marainviller

- Coat of arms
- Location of Marainviller
- Location within France Location within Grand Est
- Coordinates: 48°35′24″N 6°36′04″E
- Country: France
- Region: Grand Est
- Department: Meurthe-et-Moselle
- Arrondissement: Lunéville
- Canton: Baccarat

Government
  - Mayor (2020–2026): Jean-Michel Tricoteaux
- Area^{1}: 16.99 km^{2} (6.56 sq mi)
- Elevation: 231 m (758 ft)
- Highest elevation: 282 m (925 ft)
- Lowest elevation: 227 m (745 ft)
- Population (2023): 704
  - Density: 41.4/km^{2} (107/sq mi)
- Time zone: UTC+01:00 (CET)
  - Summer (DST): UTC+02:00 (CEST)
- INSEE/Postal code: 54350 /54300
- ^{1} French Land Register data, which excludes lakes, ponds, glaciers > 1 km^{2} (0.386 sq mi or 247 acres) and river estuaries.

Marainviller (French pronunciation: [maʁɛ̃vile]) is a commune in the Meurthe-et-Moselle department in north-eastern France.

== See also ==
- Communes of the Meurthe-et-Moselle department
