= Lunéville =

Lunéville Leneinvile (Lorrain)
- Subprefecture and commune
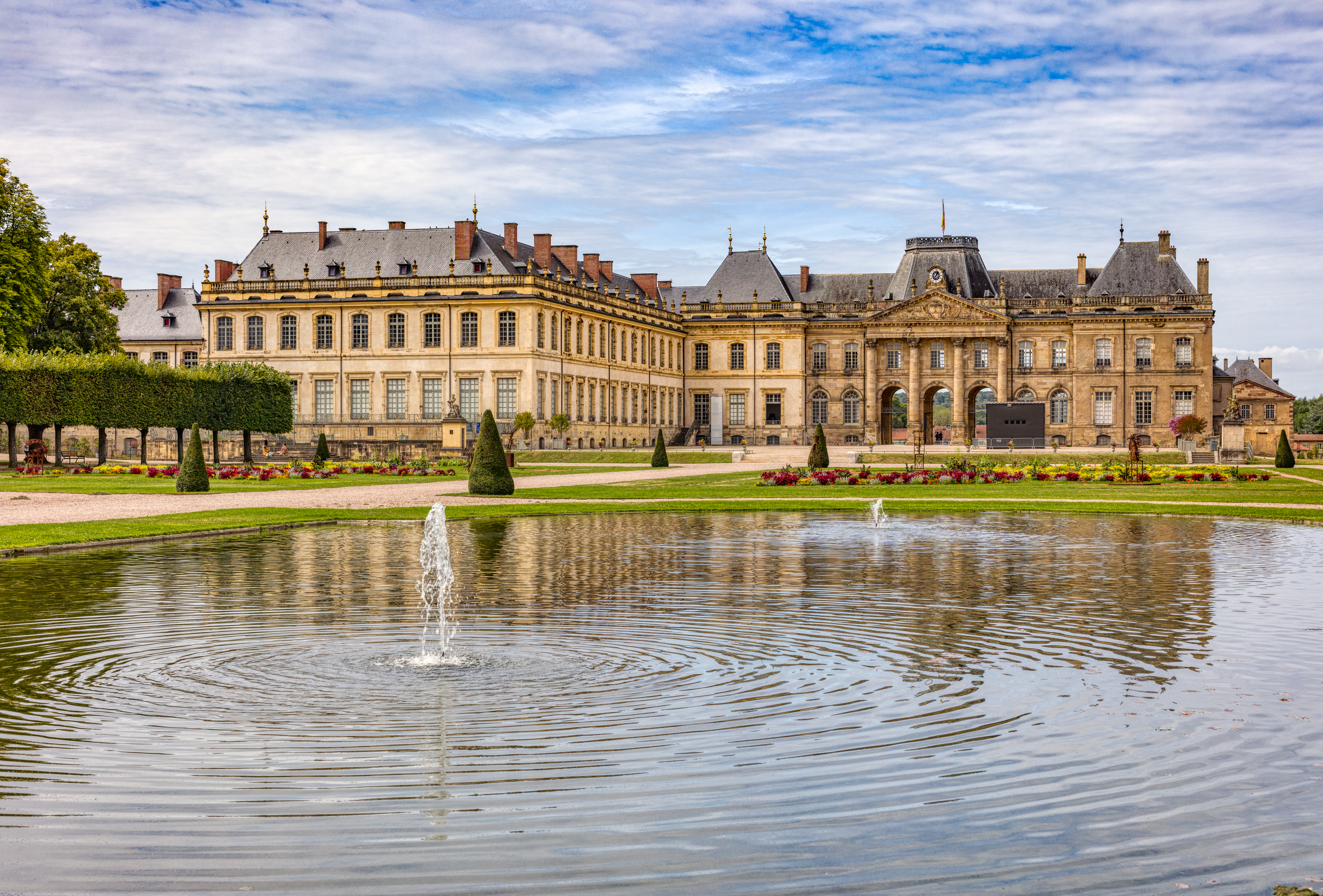
- Palace of Lunéville

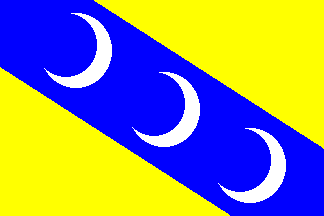
- Flag Coat of arms
- Location of Lunéville
- Location within France Location within Grand Est
- Coordinates: 48°35′22″N 6°30′06″E
- Country: France
- Region: Grand Est
- Department: Meurthe-et-Moselle
- Arrondissement: Lunéville
- Canton: Lunéville-1 and 2
- Intercommunality: Territoire de Lunéville à Baccarat

Government
  - Mayor (2020–2026): Catherine Paillard
- Area^{1}: 16.34 km^{2} (6.31 sq mi)
- Population (2023): 18,262
  - Density: 1,118/km^{2} (2,895/sq mi)
- Time zone: UTC+01:00 (CET)
  - Summer (DST): UTC+02:00 (CEST)
- INSEE/Postal code: 54329 /54300
- Website: luneville.fr
- ^{1} French Land Register data, which excludes lakes, ponds, glaciers > 1 km^{2} (0.386 sq mi or 247 acres) and river estuaries.

Lunéville (French pronunciation: [lynevil]; German: Lünstadt [ˈlʏnʃtat]; Lorrain: Leneinvile) is a commune in the northeastern French department of Meurthe-et-Moselle.

It is a subprefecture of the department and lies on the river Meurthe at its confluence with the Vezouze.

== History ==
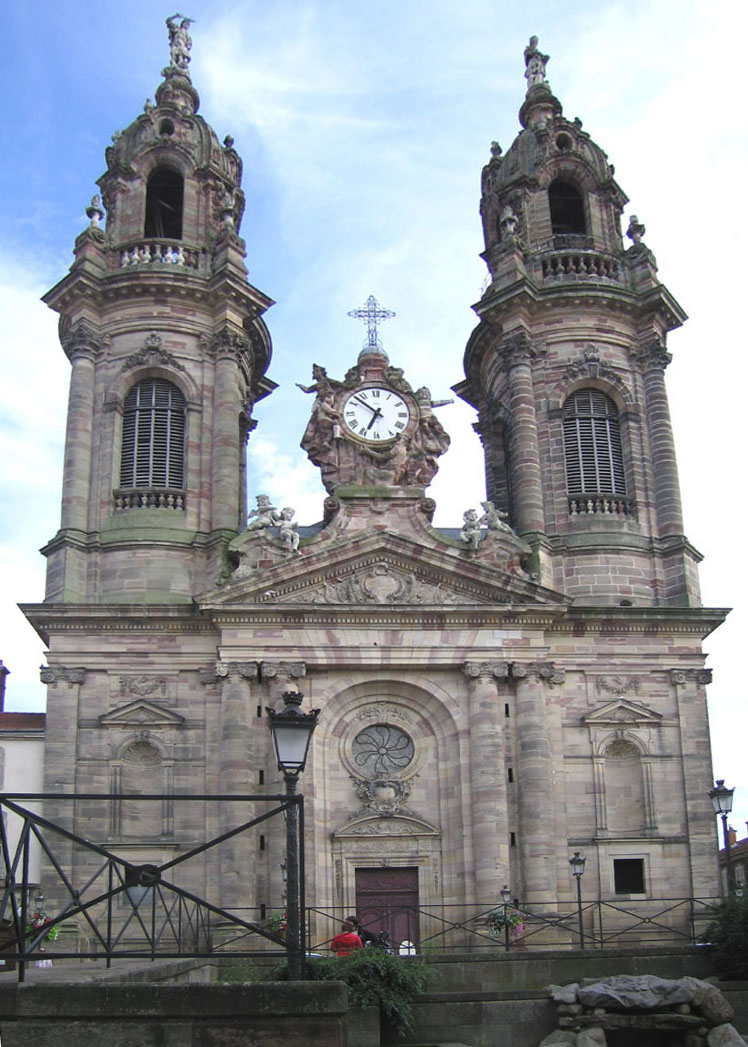
Église Saint-Jacques in Lunéville, established by Stanisław Leszczyński, king of Poland and Grand Duke of Lithuania in 1745.

Lunéville was a renowned resort in the 18th century, known as the capital of Lorraine. The grand Château de Lunéville, built in 1702 for Leopold, Duke of Lorraine to replace an older palace, was the residence of the duke of Lorraine until the duchy was annexed by France in 1766. The château was designed in the style of Versailles to satisfy Leopold's wife, Élisabeth Charlotte d'Orléans, the niece of Louis XIV, and became known as the "Versailles of Lorraine". It includes a chapel designed by Germain Boffrand. Leopold and his wife were the parents of Prince Charles Alexander of Lorraine and Francis I, Holy Roman Emperor (through him they were the grandparents of Marie Antoinette).

The last duke of Lorraine was Stanislaus I, the former king of Poland and Grand Duke of Lithuania. A devout Catholic, an author and a philanthropist, Stanislaus had a church built and several follies in his gardens for the amusement and education of visiting Polish and Lithuanian nobility and followers of the Enlightenment. The more famous visitors to his court were Voltaire, Jean-Jacques Rousseau, André Morellet, and Montesquieu. After the death of his father-in-law in 1766, Louis XV of France annexed the duchy and turned the castle into a barracks, but much of the original construction has survived, and what remains is open to the public and the château's intricate parterre gardens, designed by Yves Hours (a pupil of André Le Nôtre) in 1711 and Louis de Nesle in 1724, are a public park today.

It was over the nearby Parroy Forest, directly east of Lunéville, only some 11 months after the outbreak of World War I, that the first aerial victory by a fighter aircraft armed with a synchronised machine gun occurred on 1 July 1915, as the German Fliegertruppe officer Kurt Wintgens forced down an Aeronautique Militaire Morane-Saulnier L parasol monoplane. Neither member of the French air crew was seriously wounded, while the French aircraft's Gnome Lambda engine received multiple hits to disable the aircraft.

== Treaties ==
The Treaty of Lunéville was signed at 61 Rue de Lorraine (Treaty House), one of the houses built up against the château gardens of Lunéville, on 9 February 1801 between the French Republic and the Austrian Empire by Joseph Bonaparte and Count Ludwig von Cobenzl.

Another treaty, signed in Germany, was the Treaty of Frankfurt (1871). It made Lunéville into a border town that attracted people from Alsace and Moselle who relocated to keep their French nationality. A new period of economic prosperity, known as the Belle Époque, restored some of the glory of Stanislas's ducal court of the 18th century.

== Industry ==
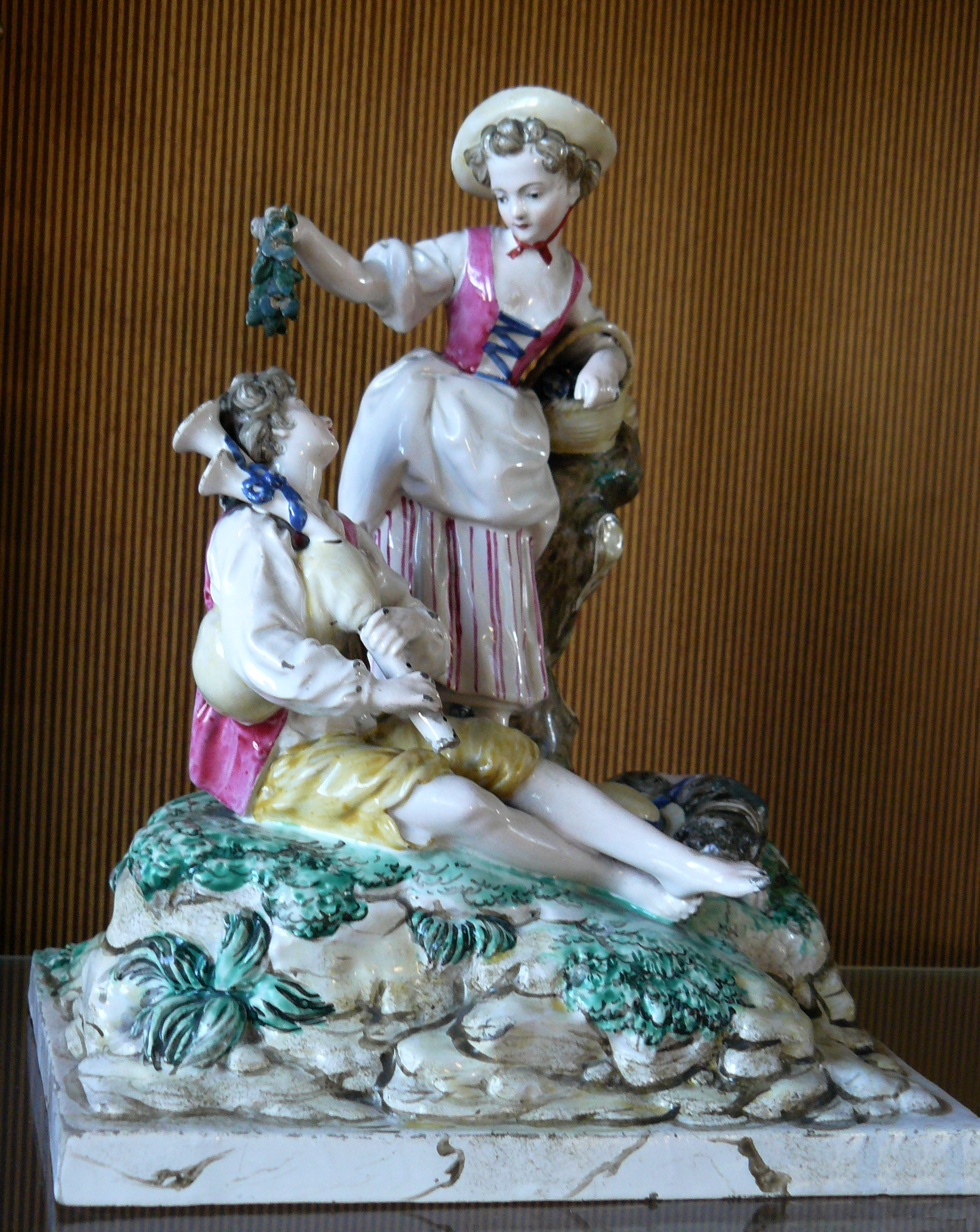
Lunéville faience was made famous for its widely copied collectable figurines mostly designed by Paul-Louis Cyfflé. This group is from 1770-1780, Sèvres museum collection.

Lunéville faience, a kind of unglazed faience produced from 1723 at Lunéville by Jacques Chambrette, became the Manufacture Royale du Roi de Pologne (“Royal Factory of the King of Poland”) after Stanislaus sponsored it in 1749. The earthenware first became famous for its detailed figurines and in the 20th century for its art deco designs, and it still exists today as "Terres d'Est".

In 1858, the glass factory of Croismare was built. It became famous when the Müller brothers settled there in 1897 and began creating Art Deco glass designs.

Louis Ferry-Bonnechaux discovered a technique using beads and sequins on embroidery in 1865. His craft was widely copied and became known as Lunéville Point, and its heritage can still be seen in modern haute couture.

A subsidiary of the Dietrich company, Lorraine-Dietrich moved to Lunéville after the 1871 treaty of Frankfurt. Today it is known for its trailers, but it started off as a manufacturer of cars and railway equipment.

== Demographics ==
Historical population

Year	Pop.	±% p.a.
1793	11,691	—
1800	10,436	−1.61%
1806	11,555	+1.71%
1821	11,247	−0.18%
1831	12,378	+0.96%
1836	12,798	+0.67%
1841	12,285	−0.81%
1846	12,278	−0.01%
1851	12,476	+0.32%
1856	15,301	+4.17%
1861	15,528	+0.29%
1872	12,369	−2.05%
1876	16,041	+6.71%
1881	18,136	+2.49%
1886	20,500	+2.48%
1891	21,542	+1.00%
1896	22,599	+0.96%
1901	23,269	+0.59%

Year	Pop.	±% p.a.
1906	24,266	+0.84%
1911	25,587	+1.07%
1921	24,366	−0.49%
1926	23,263	−0.92%
1931	24,668	+1.18%
1936	23,665	−0.83%
1946	20,377	−1.48%
1954	22,690	+1.35%
1962	21,618	−0.60%
1968	23,177	+1.17%
1975	22,709	−0.29%
1982	21,468	−0.80%
1990	20,711	−0.45%
1999	20,200	−0.28%
2007	20,078	−0.08%
2012	19,855	−0.22%
2017	18,287	−1.63%
2023	18,262	−0.02%

Source: EHESS and INSEE (1968-2023)

== Notable people ==
- Stanisław I Leszczyński (1677–1766), King of Poland 1704-1709, 1733-1736 (reigned as Stanislaus I), then Duke of Lorraine until his death at Lunéville where he spent 30 years in exile.
- Muller Frères, an art nouveau glass production company
- Georges de La Tour lived in Lunéville for much of his career
- Émilie du Châtelet who lived a long time in Lunéville and died there

Lunéville was the birthplace of :

- Nicolas Beatrizet, 16th century engraver
- Joseph de Ferraris (1726-1814), general and cartographer
- Ernest Bichat (1845-1905), physicist
- Prince Charles Alexander of Lorraine, 1712
- François Nicolas Benoît, Baron Haxo, 24 June 1774
- René Basset (1855–1924), orientalist
- Henri Basset (1892–1926), son of the above, linguist and historian
- André Basset (1895–1956), younger brother of the above, linguist, orientalist
- Marie Bobillier (1858–1918), musicologist
- Louis Émile Gratia (1878–1962), musicologist
- Jean Bastien-Thiry, (1927–1963), attempted assassination of president de Gaulle
- Claude Ponti (1948-), children's author and illustrator.

== Geology ==
In 1874, a fossil Bennettitalean stem excavated from the area near the city was described as Cylindropodium liasinum by Saporta, which was reassigned in 2016 to the genus Cycadeoidea under Cycadeoidea cylindrica.

== Twin towns ==
Lunéville is twinned with:

- Schwetzingen, Germany, since 1969

== See also ==
- Communes of the Meurthe-et-Moselle department
