= International Congress of Physics =

Physics conference in Paris (1900)

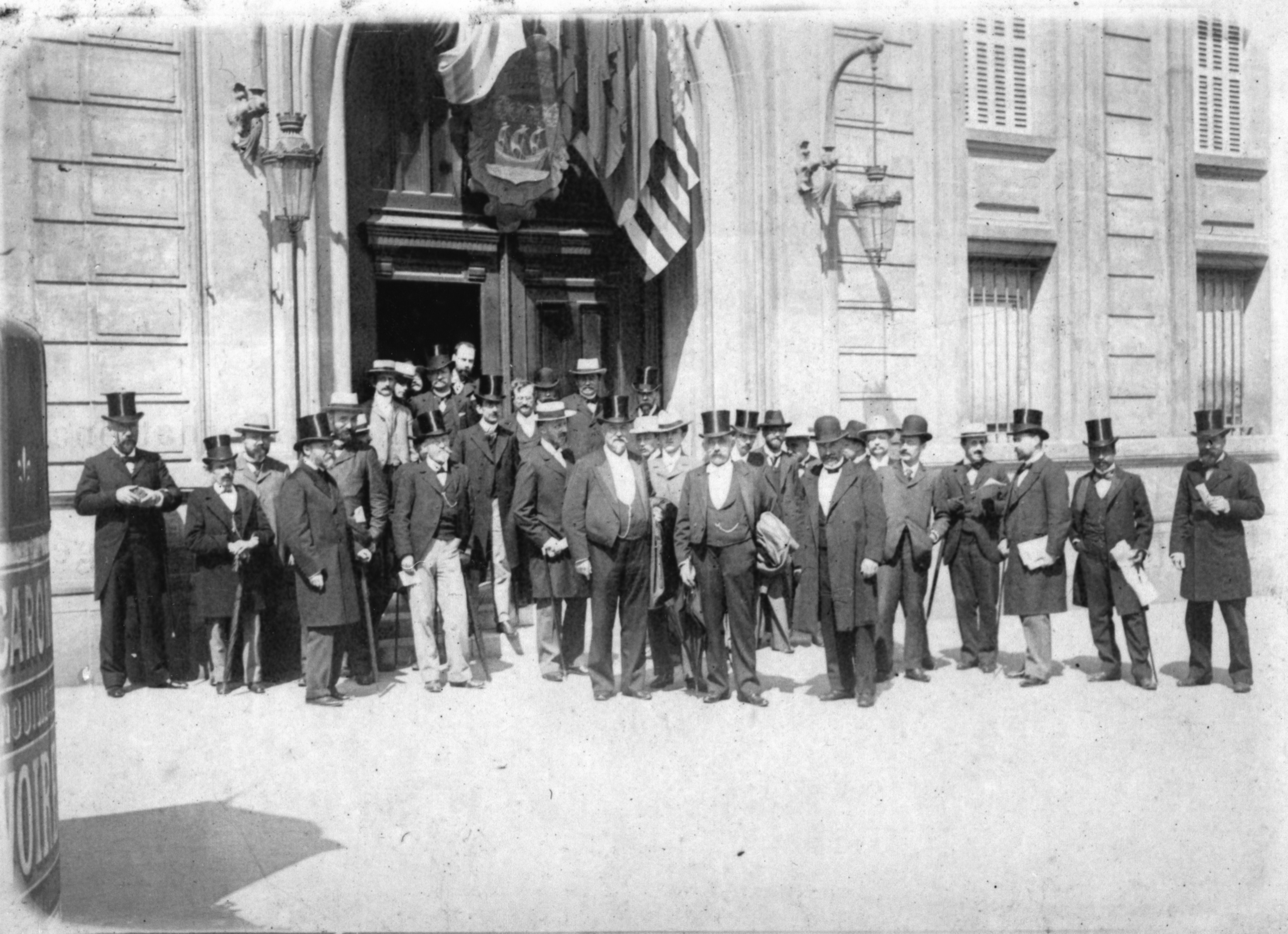
Participants at the International Congress of Physics. Alfred Cornu is the central figure with the pocket watch.

The International Congress of Physics (French: Congrès international de physique) was a scientific conference held in Paris from 6 to 10 August 1900, in connection with the 1900 Exposition Universelle. It was the first large international conference about physics as a whole. Physicists from 15 countries took part, and there were over 70 scientific submissions. It included all major areas of physics at the time, including metrology, mechanical and thermal properties of matter, optics, thermodynamics, electromagnetism, astronomy, gravitation and biophysics. One of the organizers, Charles Édouard Guillaume, reporting to Nature, considered that the congress provided "the most complete representation of any science at a given epoch ever made."

Novel discoveries at the time were discussed, including radioactivity, the electron and cathode rays, and challenges related to the black-body radiation and to the Michelson–Morley experiment. During the conference, the first experimental evidence of radiation pressure was presented by Pyotr Lebedev. The congress highlighted many of the problems of the turn of the century that would later be solved by the discovery of quantum mechanics (1900) and special relativity (1905).

The congress was held in parallel to the second International Congress of Mathematicians, also taking place in Paris, where David Hilbert introduced his list of problems.

== Organization and background ==
The congress was held about the same time as the Dreyfus affair; this led to strikes in Paris. European governments were also involved in the Second Boer War and in quelling the Boxer Rebellion in China.

The congress was organized by the Société Française de Physique. The organization committee was presided by Alfred Cornu. Other members included Louis Paul Cailletet, Lucien Poincaré, and Charles Édouard Guillaume. Invitations were sent in July 1900, and 20 French francs were required to register. William Thomson, better known as Lord Kelvin, was voted as honorary president.

The congress was divided into seven categories:

- general questions and metrology (presided by Justin-Mirande René Benoit);
- mechanical and molecular physics (presided by Jules Violle);
- optics and thermodynamics (presided by Gabriel Lippmann);
- electricity and magnetism (presided by Alfred Potier);
- magneto-optics, cathode rays and uranium (presided by Henri Becquerel);
- cosmic physics (presided by Éleuthère Mascart); and
- biological physics (presided by Augustin Charpentier). (Note: Originally intended to be presided by Jacques-Arsène d'Arsonval but could not attend.)

At the time physics was considered to be one of the only academic topics not to have participated in large international conferences.

Cornu opened the conference with a speech at the Palais des congrès de Paris, and physicists later met at the Hotel de la Société de l'Encouragement. The conference included visits to the Eiffel Tower and to main laboratories in Paris. German physicist Hermann Theodor Simon, reporting to the Physikalische Zeitschrift, considered the visits and experiments superfluous. Simon also criticized the lack of a list of participants and the lack of an official meeting bar for post-session discussion, as in the German tradition.

== Topics ==
=== Overview and challenges ===
Henri Poincaré held the initial plenary keynote on the overview of physics, turn of the century problems, and philosophy of science. He also highlighted the importance of enriching libraries with scientific literature. He also raised the epistemological question of what should be the importance of mathematical physics, and discussed the possibly bankruptcy of science for lack of more fundamental principles. Poincaré also participated at the same time in the International Congress of Mathematicians and in the first World Congress of Philosophy.

=== Metrology ===
The International Bureau of Weights and Measures highlighted the importance of the precision of measurements of the Michelson–Morley experiment which played a central role in the discussions of measurement units. Benoit discussed the idea of using the speed of light to redefine the base units. However Cornu had measured the speed of light some years before Michelson-Morley and questioned the validity of the experiment.

=== Aether theory ===
In Henri Poincaré's address, he promoted the idea of abandoning the hypothesis of the luminiferous aether and asserted that only relative motions would ever be observed.

Similarly, in a keynote lecture of Lord Kelvin in the thermodynamics section of the congress, he addressed his work on trying to understand the aether and an elastic solid. However he considered that this idea was unphysical and hard to reconcile with the Michelson–Morley experiment. However Kelvin found interest in the hypothesis of George Francis FitzGerald and Hendrik Lorentz of length contraction when moving through aether. Kelvin proposed to test length contraction by repeating the Michelson–Morley experiment with different materials and at different altitudes. These tests were carried out in 1905 and 1907, but failed to indicate the existence of the aether.

=== Cathode rays and the electron ===
J. J. Thomson lectured on his recent discoveries and his explanation based on the existence of the electron. French scientist Paul Ulrich Villard proposed an alternative theory. Most French physicists considered that electrons did not exist and thought that Thomson's discovery could be explained by hydrogen ions. The congress was influential in introducing Thomson's ideas into France.

Pieter Zeeman's recently discovered Zeeman effect played an important role in the discussion. Lorentz' and Joseph Larmor's discussions on electrodynamics during the congress used the term "electron". Paul Drude presented the Drude model for conduction, optical and thermal properties of metals as a free electron gas.

=== Radioactivity ===
Henri Becquerel, and Pierre and Marie Curie presented a review on the recently discovered radioactivity. The Curies also discussed ties between cathode rays and Thomson's electron theory with respect to radioactivity.

=== Blackbody radiation ===
Wilhelm Wien, Ernst Pringsheim Sr. and Otto Lummer discussed known theory and recent experiments on blackbody radiation.

=== Light pressure ===
Pyotr Lebedev presented for the first time his experiments that demonstrated that radiation pressure was a real phenomenon, as theorized by James Clerk Maxwell. Lord Kelvin is attested to having said to Kliment Timiryazev:

"Maybe you know that all my life I struggled against Maxwell not admitting his light pressure, and now yours Lebedev make me to give up in front of his experiments."

== Participants ==
About 836 participants attended the congress according to statisticians, only 791 were registered. Participants that submitted a paper included:

- Henri Abraham
- Émile Amagat
- Joseph Sweetman Ames
- Svante Arrhenius
- Carl Barus
- Angelo Battelli
- Henri Becquerel
- Justin-Mirande René Benoit
- Ernest Bichat and René Swyngedauw
- Kristian Birkeland
- Vilhelm Bjerknes
- André Blondel
- Prosper-René Blondlot and Camille Gutton
- Henry du Bois
- Jagadish Chandra Bose
- Robert Bourgeois
- Edmond Bouty
- C. V. Boys
- Édouard Branly
- Marcel Brillouin
- André Broca
- Emmanuel Carvallo
- Pierre Chappuis
- Augustin Charpentier
- Christian Christiansen
- Alfred Cornu
- André Crova
- Pierre and Marie Curie
- Paul Drude
- Charles Dufour
- Loránd Eötvös
- Franz S. Exner
- François-Alphonse Forel and Edouard Sarasin
- Prince Boris Borisovich Golitsyn and Johan Vilip
- Louis Georges Gouy
- Ernest Howard Griffiths
- Charles Édouard Guillaume
- Eduard Hagenbach-Bischoff
- Albert Hénocque (Collège de France)
- Jacobus Henricus van 't Hoff
- Dragomir Hurmuzescu
- Lord Kelvin
- Viktor von Lang
- Pyotr Lebedev
- Anatole Leduc
- Gabriel Lippmann
- Hendrik Lorentz
- Otto Lummer
- Jules Macé de Lepinay
- Émile Mathias
- Augustin Mesnager
- Hantaro Nagaoka
- Adam Paulsen
- Henri Pellat
- Jean Baptiste Perrin
- Henri Poincaré
- Lucien Poincaré
- Alfred Potier
- John Henry Poynting
- Ernst Pringsheim Sr.
- Augusto Righi
- William Chandler Roberts-Austen and Alfred Stansfield
- Heinrich Rubens
- Johannes Rydberg
- Théodore Schwedoff (Odesa University)
- Walthère Victor Spring
- J. J. Thomson
- Marius Tscherning
- Gustave Van der Mensbrugghe
- Paul Ulrich Villard
- Emilio Villari
- Jules Violle
- Woldemar Voigt
- Johannes Diderik van der Waals
- Emil Warburg
- Boris Petrowitsch Weinberg
- Wilhelm Wien
- Aimé Witz (University of Lille)

Only two women were registered for the conference. Aside from Marie Curie, the only other female physicist to attend the congress was Isabelle Stone.

A notable participant was Max Planck, who would later resolve the issues with black body radiation with the introduction of quantum mechanics.

== See also ==
- International Electrical Congress (1900)
