= Domenico Pacini =

Italian physicist (1878–1934)

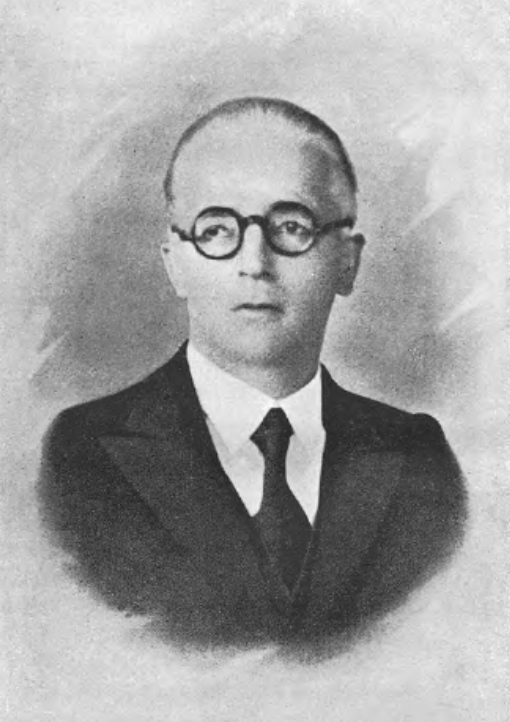
Domenico Pacini in 1920.

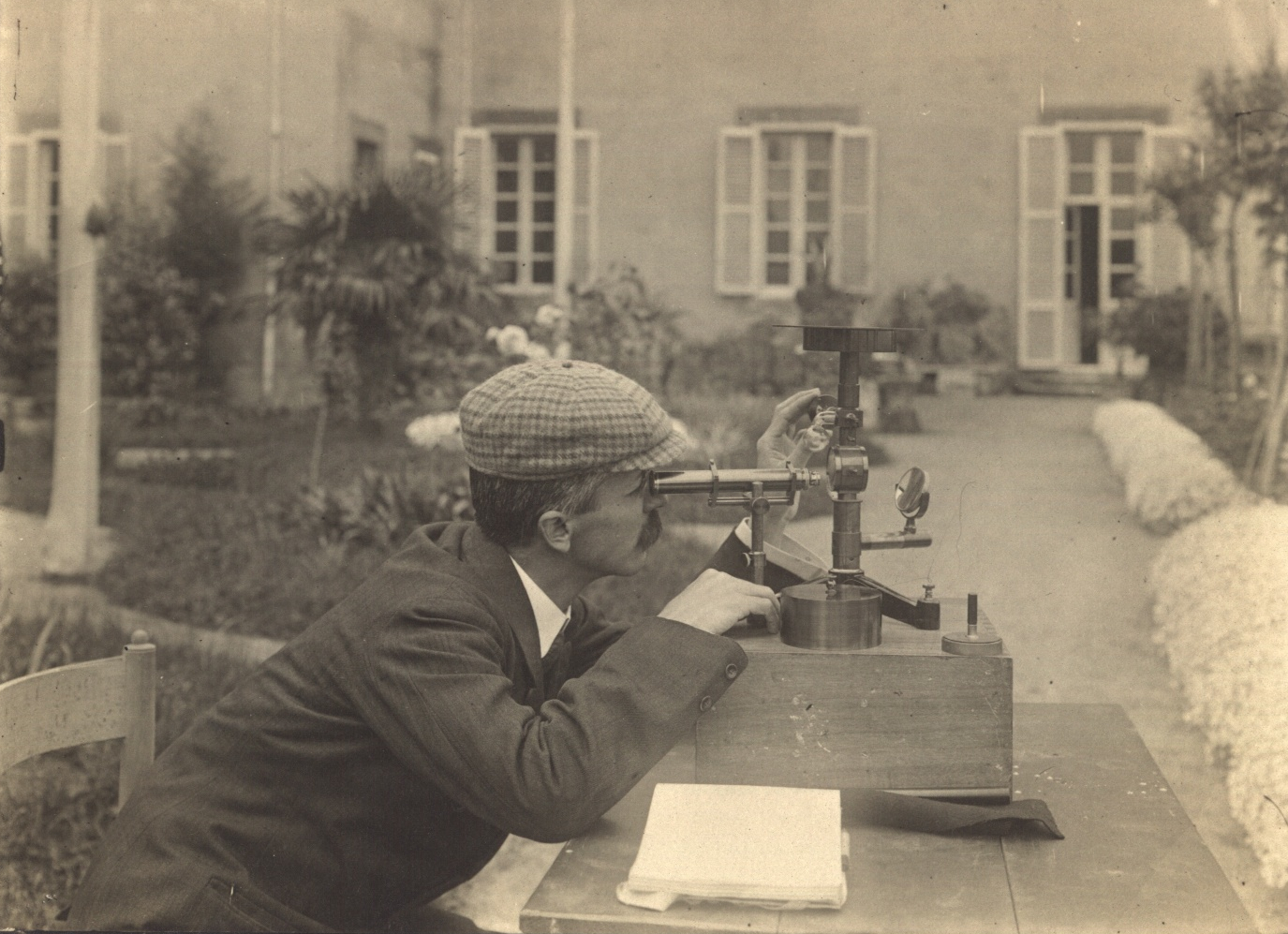
Pacini makes a measurement in 1910.

Domenico Pacini (February 20, 1878 – May 23, 1934) was an Italian physicist noted for his contributions to the discovery of cosmic rays.

== Biography ==
Pacini was born in Marino near Rome. He studied science and graduated at the University of Rome in 1902. He then worked with Pietro Blaserna and Alfonso Sella. He studied the so-called N-ray described by Blondlot in 1904. He became an assistant at the "Regio Ufficio Centrale di Meteorologia e di Geodinamica" (Italian Agency of Meteorology and Geodynamics) from 1905 to 1927, where he studied lightning and weather phenomena. He taught geophysics from 1915 to 1925 at the University of Rome, then became a full professor of Experimental physics at the University of Bari from 1928. He established a physics division. He got married and died of pneumonia in Rome.

It had been observed that an electroscope in a vessel at earth potential gradually lost its charge, even if very carefully insulated, due to the ionization of the air. Pacini observed simultaneous variations of the rate of ionization on mountains, over a lake, over the sea, and underwater. In an experiment performed in June 1911, Pacini concluded that ionization underwater was significantly lower than on the sea surface. He could then demonstrate that a certain part of the ionization itself must be due to sources other than the radioactivity of the Earth, thus contributing to the discovery of cosmic rays.
