= Shrinkflation =

Reduction of quantity/quality of a good without corresponding price reduction

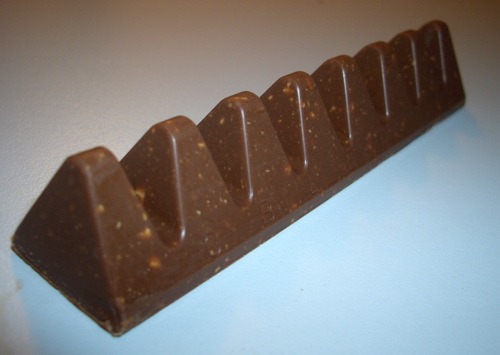
Toblerone chocolate bar, 2006

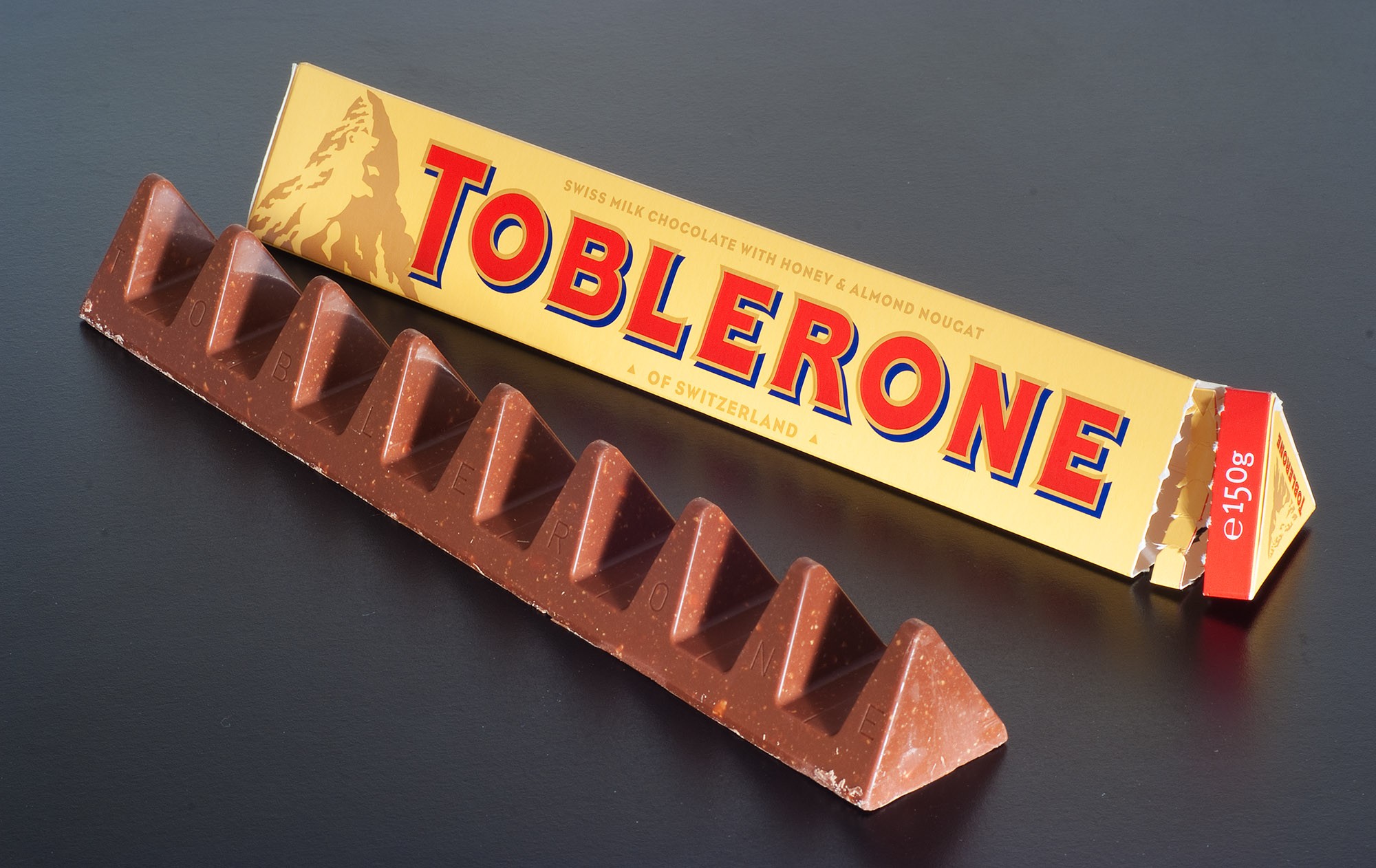
2016 Toblerone bar from the United Kingdom with larger gaps between peaks, using 10% less chocolate

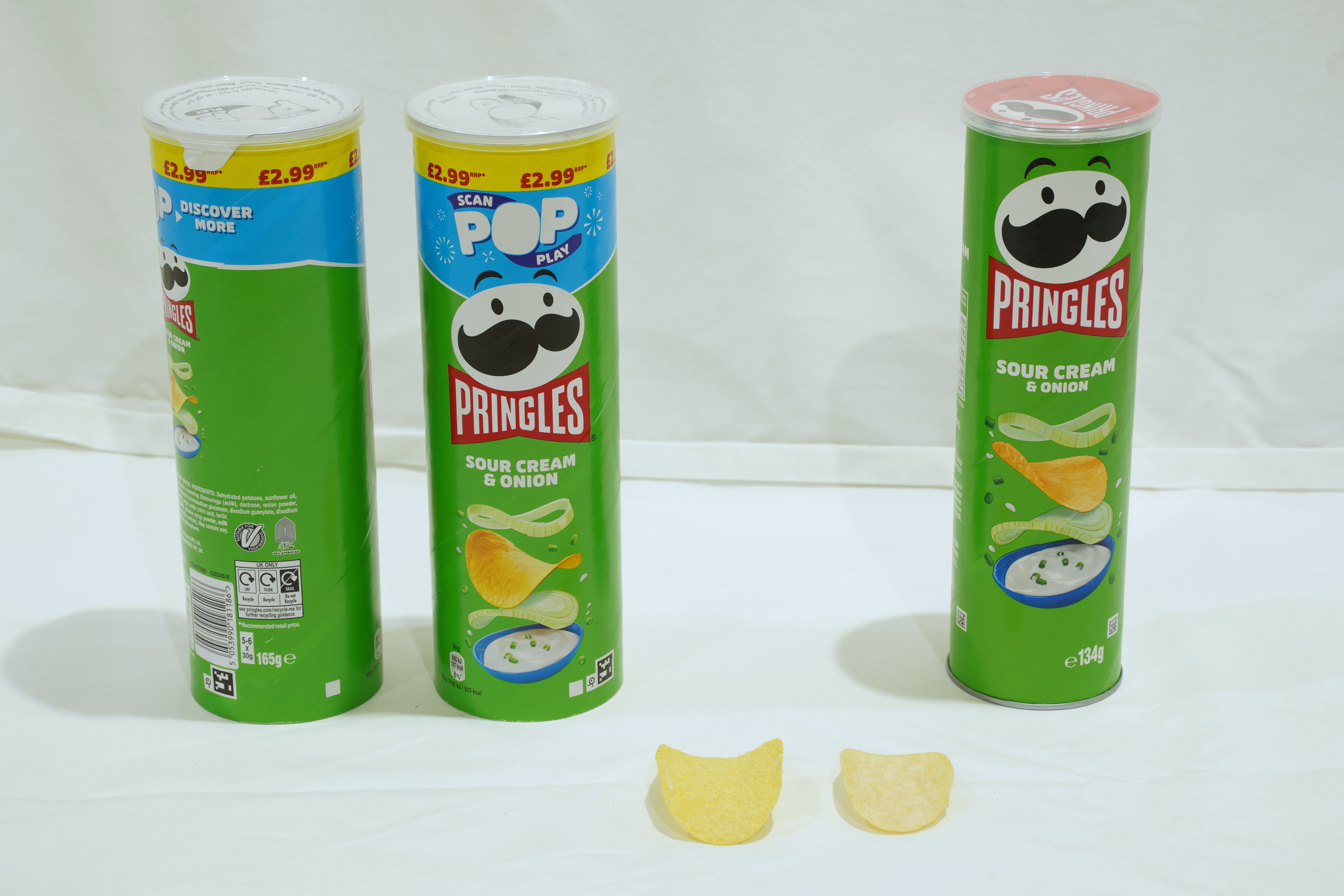
Kellogg's shortened and shrank the diameter of the standard tube of Pringles in Australia through the 2010s and 2020s, as they shifted production from the United States to Malaysia. The net weight of each tube was reduced from 165g to 134g, the size of each Pringle was also reduced, and consumers also noticed a blander taste. These changes also coincided with price increases.

In economics, shrinkflation, also known as package downsizing, weight-out, and price pack architecture is the reduction of available products, in size or quantity, while the prices remain the same. The word is a portmanteau of the words shrink and inflation and was coined as the counterpart to economic inflation, wherein prices rise while the product remains unchanged. A related term, skimpflation, involves a reformulation or other reduction in quality.

Shrinkflation allows manufacturers and retailers to manage rising production costs while maintaining sales volume, operating margin, and profitability, and is often used as an alternative to raising prices in line with inflation. Some consumer protection groups criticize shrinkflation, but some economists defend it as a rational way to deal with inflation and cost increases when customers are highly price-sensitive.

== Economic definition ==
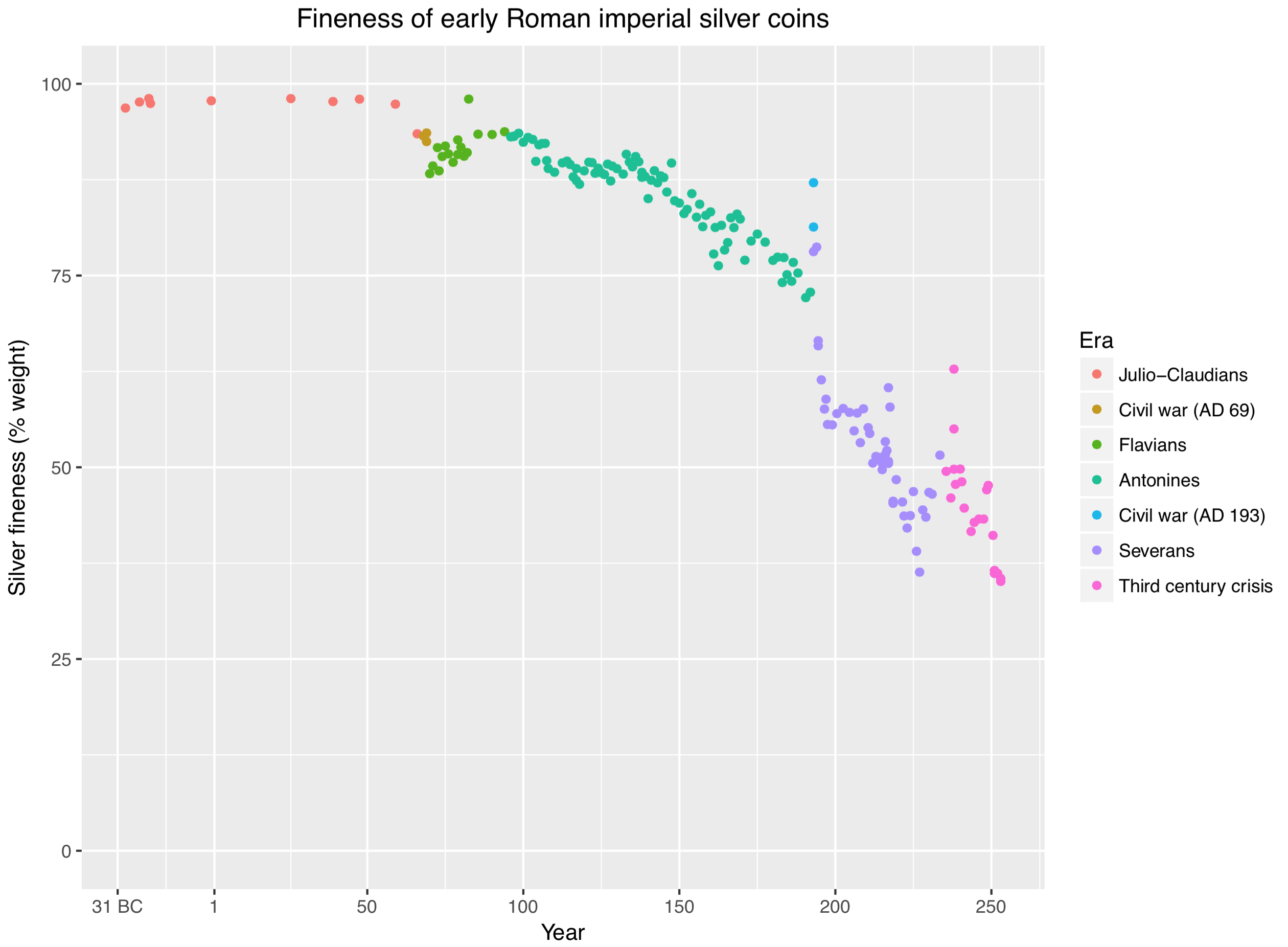
A parallel to shrinkflation is currency debasement. This graph shows decline in coin silver content over the history of the Roman Empire.

Shrinkflation is a rise in the general price level of goods per unit of weight or volume, brought about by a reduction in the weight or size of the item sold. The price for one piece of the packaged product remains the same. This sometimes does not affect inflation measures such as the consumer price index or Retail Price Index, i.e. it might not increase in the cost of a basket of retail goods and services, but many indicators of price levels and thus inflation are linked to units of volume or weight of products, so that shrinkflation also affects the statistically represented inflation figures.

The first use of the term shrinkflation with its current meaning has been attributed to the economist Pippa Malmgren, though the same term had been used earlier by historian Brian Domitrovic to refer to an economy shrinking while also suffering high inflation.

== Causes ==
Barak Orbach, an academic economist, argues that competition typically drives shrinkflation: "When supply shocks or other factors inflate production costs, businesses must pass on cost increases to maintain profitability. In competitive markets, however, direct price increases are risky. Under such conditions, businesses often choose to raise prices indirectly through downsizing."

Without explicitly using the term shrinkflation, macroeconomist Vivek Moorthy much earlier documented and analysed the shrinkage effect of inflation, explaining it by Arthur Okun's "invisible handshake" approach: "Prices are ... based on notions of trust and fairness. it is considered acceptable for firms to respond to cost increases, but not to demand increases. Firms selling a branded product will make deliberate efforts to continue selling at the same price thereby retaining loyal customers. Hence, to cope with inflation, fast moving consumer goods firms would often resort to shrinking the product size to avoid raising prices."

== Consumer impact ==
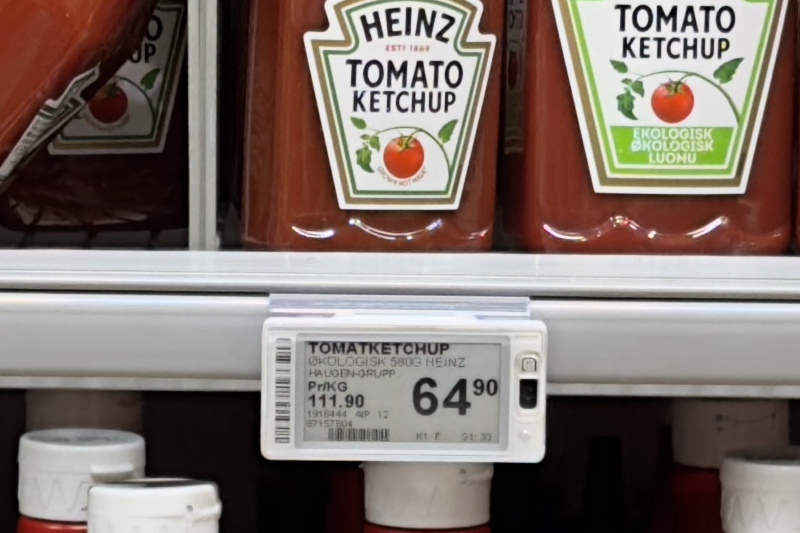
Many grocery stores provide unit price information for all products. In this Norwegian grocery store, the price for a bottle of ketchup is displayed in terms of the price paid per package (64.90 kr) as well as the price paid per kilogram (111.90 kr). This allows customers to see how much they will pay and to quickly compare products that have different sizes of packages.

Some consumer advocates are critical of shrinkflation because it has the effect of reducing product value by "stealth". The reduction in pack size is sufficiently small as not to be immediately obvious to regular consumers. An unchanged price means that most consumers will not immediately notice the higher unit price, which adversely affects consumers' ability to make informed buying choices. Consumers have been found to be deterred more by rises in prices than by reductions in pack sizes, and some customers would rather have a smaller package at the old price than the old package size at a higher price.

Suppliers and retailers have been called upon to be upfront with customers. According to Ratula Chakraborty, a professor of business management, they should be legally obliged to notify shoppers when pack sizes have been reduced. In 2023, the French grocery chain Carrefour started to warn their customers about these practices.

Corporate bodies deflect attention from product shrinkage by claiming health benefits of smaller portions or environmental benefits of less packaging.

Shrinkflation is not the only cause of reduced package sizes. In some cases, such as junk food, some customers do prefer smaller package sizes.

In other cases, the change is part of a trend to adjust package sizes. In 2003, Danone shrank its yogurt containers from 8 ounces to 6 ounces, because consumers thought their larger product was too expensive overall; many, though not all, of the grocery stores selling it maintained the old price for the smaller product. Most yogurt manufacturers followed suit, resulting in smaller packages.

== Just-noticeable difference ==
In experimental psychology, a just-noticeable difference is the amount something must be changed for a difference to be noticeable. Discovered by Ernst Heinrich Weber, the JND is a fixed proportion of the reference sensory level, and so the ratio of the JND/reference is roughly constant:
$$\frac {\Delta I} {I} = k$$
where $I\!$ is the original intensity of the particular stimulation, $\Delta I\!$ is the addition to it required for the change to be perceived, and k is a constant. Weber's law has important applications in marketing. Manufacturers and marketers endeavor to determine the relevant JND for their products for two very different reasons:

1. Negative changes (e.g. reductions in product size or quality, or increase in product price) are not discernible to the public (i.e. remain below JND) and
2. Product improvements (e.g. improved or updated packaging, larger size or lower price) are very apparent to consumers without being wastefully extravagant (i.e. they are at or just above the JND).

When it comes to product improvements, marketers very much want to meet or exceed the consumer's differential threshold; that is, they want consumers to readily perceive any improvements made in the original products. Marketers use the JND to determine the amount of improvement they should make in their products. Less than the JND is wasted effort because the improvement will not be perceived; more than the JND is again wasteful because it reduces the level of repeat sales. On the other hand, when it comes to price increases, less than the JND is desirable because consumers are unlikely to notice it.

== Statistics ==
The UK Office for National Statistics wrote in 2019, "We identified 206 products that shrank in size and 79 that increased in size between September 2015 and June 2017. There was no trend in the frequency of size changes over this period, which included the EU referendum. The majority of products experiencing size changes were food products and in 2016, we estimated that between 1% and 2.1% of food products in our sample shrank in size, while between 0.3% and 0.7% got bigger. We also observed that prices tended not to change when products changed size, consistent with the idea that some products are undergoing 'shrinkflation'."

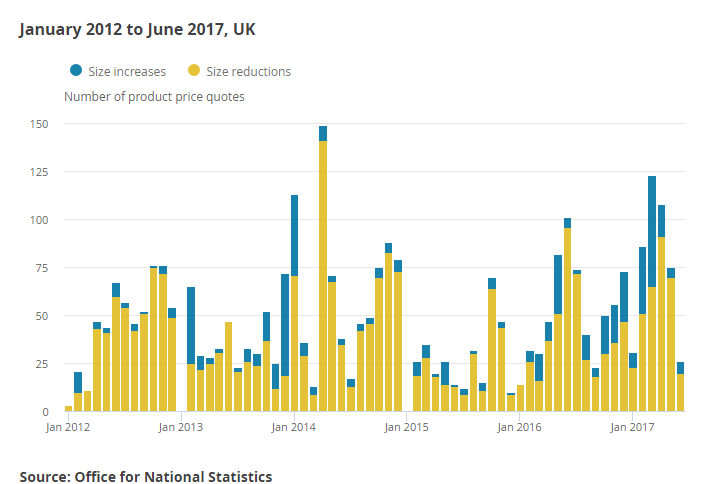
Impact of Shrinkflation on CPIH in the UK, with the number of food price quotes that saw a change in package size per month

In the United States, the Bureau of Labor Statistics has written that "the impact of product downsizing at the all commodity and services level is minimal, with an average annual effect of 0.01 percent per year, so while consumers may notice shrinkflation at the grocery store, it has a very small impact the overall inflation picture they face."

== Examples ==
- Coffee sold in 1 lb (453.6 g) bags shrank to 400 g or smaller in the 1980s.
- In India in 2008, Procter and Gamble reduced the pack size of its detergent Tide from 1 kg to 850 g while maintaining the same price. Similarly around 2012, Orbit reduced the chewing gum pack size from 6 to 5 units, keeping the price at ₹5. In 2013 the staple breakfast item idli was shrunk from 100 g to 75 g, as reported in the Bangalore Mirror.
- In January 2009, Häagen-Dazs announced that it would be reducing the size of their ice cream cartons in the US from 16 US fl oz (470 ml) to 14 US fl oz (410 ml).
- In 2010, Kraft reduced its 200 g Toblerone bar to 170 g.
- Tetley tea bags were sold in boxes of 88 instead of 100.
- Nestlé reduced its After Eight Mint Chocolate Thins box from 200 g to 170 g.
- Cadbury's Crunchies were sold in packs of three instead of four.
- In 2015, Cadbury Fingers removed two fingers from each pack, reducing the weight of a pack from 125 grams to 111 grams.
- In July 2015, a tub of Cadbury Roses, which weighed 975 g in 2011, was reduced to under 730 g, while a tub of Cadbury Heroes was reduced to 695 g. Nonetheless, the price remained the same at around £9.
- Around 2015, Kellogg's shortened and shrank the diameter of the standard tube of Pringles in Australia and New Zealand, as they shifted production from the United States to Malaysia. The net weight of each tube was reduced from 165g to 134g, the size of each Pringle was also reduced, and consumers also noticed a blander taste. These changes also coincided with price increases.
- In 2016, Terry's Chocolate Orange was reduced from 175 g to 157 g by changing the moulded shape of each segment to leave an air gap between each piece.
- In 2016, Mondelez International again reduced the size of the UK 170 g Toblerone bar to 150 g, while the 400 g bar was reduced to 360 g. This was done by enlarging the gap between the chocolate triangles.
- In 2017, Milka Alpine Milk and Milka Nuts & Raisins got reduced from 300 g to 270 g while Triolade got reduced from 300 g to 280 g, all without changing the bag size.
- In 2017, McVities reduced the number of Jaffa Cakes in every standard packet from 12 to 10, raising the cost per cake from 9.58 p to 9.9 p.
- In 2020, Unilever reduced the size of Ben & Jerry's ice-cream tubs in Europe, going from 500 ml to 465 ml, whilst still retaining the RRP of around 5 euros. Despite this, Unilever has publicly criticized rival ice-cream brands for shrinkflation in the United States, where Ben & Jerry's ice-cream is still sold in pint-sized (473 ml) tubs.
- In 2021, General Mills shrank their family-sized boxes of cereal down from 19.3 ounces to 18.1 ounces. That means the unit cost per ounce of the product has increased, but for the consumer, the average price in the United States remained $2.99.
- In 2022, Procter & Gamble reduced the number of double-ply sheets per roll of toilet paper from 264 to 244 sheets in the 18-count mega package. This amounts to approximately a roll and a half in the 18-count package.
- In 2022, Unilever reduced the size of Dove soap bars from 100 g to 90 g, with most retailers either maintaining the same price or increasing prices.
- In 2023, Mars, Incorporated reduced the weight of their Whiskas cat food by 15%, reducing the weight of each pouch from 100 g to 85 g. The price of the packs did not change. This was applicable to their 12×100 g, 40×100 g, 80×100 g, and individual products for both the "in jelly" and "in gravy" products.
- In 2025, the PlayStation 5 Digital Edition was downgraded from 1 TB to 825 GB of internal storage without announcement and at the same price.
- In 2026, alongside the start of a new and more expensive Canadian media rights deal, Rogers Communications moved one night per week of National Hockey League game broadcasts from the Sportsnet cable TV channel exclusively to its Sportsnet+ streaming service, at an extra charge for many subscribers, having previously sold another night of coverage to a third-party streaming service, Prime Video. The Sportsnet channel began to air filler programs or less popular sports during these times, without reducing its carriage fees. One media analyst described the change as "shrinkflation[...] com[ing] for sports broadcasting."

== Legislation ==
In 2024, a bill was introduced in the U.S. Senate that would ban shrinkflation. A separate bill, introduced in the U.S. House of Representatives, would require brands to label products that contain less product than before at the same price. In Brazil there is a law that requires manufacturers to clearly indicate on the packaging for at least six months that the product’s net content has changed, providing both relative and absolute figures. In Austria, too, the 60-day labeling requirement has become mandatory starting in April 2026.

== Related terminology ==
In October 2021, NPR's Greg Rosalsky from Planet Money proposed the term skimpflation to refer to a degradation in the quality of services while keeping the price constant, such as a hotel offering a more meager breakfast or reducing the frequency of housekeeping. In 2023, Guardian Money described a number of ingredient changes in British supermarket foods – such as a brand of mayonnaise changing from 9% egg yolk to 6% egg and 1.5% egg yolk – as an example of skimpflation.

Unlike changes to the size and weight of a product, skimpflation is more difficult to measure in a standardized way, and consequently goes unrecorded in measurements of inflation.

Conversely, in September 2022, Izabella Kaminska's The Blind Spot published an article that proposed the term shitflation in reference to maintaining a product's price while decreasing quality. The article's author, Dario Garcia Giner, proposed that shrinkflation and shitflation spoke to the Grossman-Stiglitz paradox, and argued they were akin to "Trojan horses buried in the heart of mainstream finance — just waiting to tear down the system by discombobulating relative values in the big-data spreadsheets that central bankers and financiers depend on to manage economic allocation."

== Popular usage ==
The term has been used by President Joe Biden in 2023 and 2024 to blame companies for deploying this tactic to increase their profits, deflecting criticism about inflation during his administration and instead pinning the blame on big business. Biden's claim has been criticized, with some conservatives arguing that his economic policies and the Inflation Reduction Act were the primary cause of price increases and shrinking products.

== See also ==
- Purchasing power
- Real versus nominal value (economics)
- Deflation
- "The Grocery Shrink Ray"
- Size–weight illusion
- Deceptive packaging
- Consumer protection
- Grundpreisverordnung - German law to specify prices per 1 kilogram, 1 litre, 1 cubic metre, 1 metre or 1 square metre for easier comparison - part of PAngV
- Enshittification
- Price gouging
- Stagflation
- Drip pricing
