= Augustin Charpentier =

French physician (1852–1916)

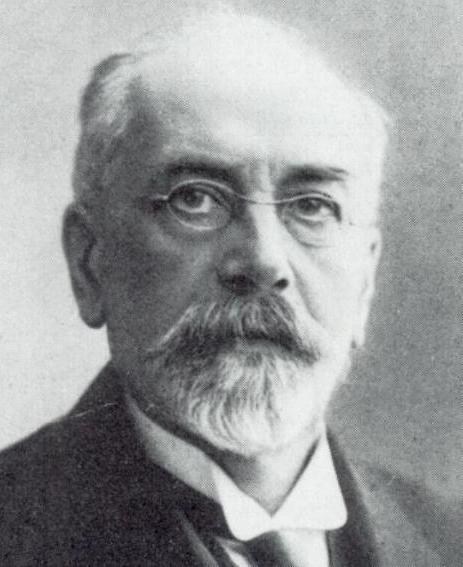
- Born: Argenton-sur-Creuse, France; June 15, 1852
- Died: August 4, 1916 (aged 64); Argenton-sur-Creuse, France
- Known for: Size–weight illusion
- Scientific career
- Fields: Medicine; Visual perception
- Workplaces: University of Nancy
- Thesis: La vision avec les diverses parties de la rétine (1877)

Pierre Marie Augustin Charpentier (15 June 1852 – 4 August 1916) was a French physician and professor of the University of Nancy. He is known for his work on human vision and optics, including the discovery of the size–weight illusion.

== Life ==
Pierre Marie Augustin Charpentier was born in Argenton-sur-Creuse, France. in 1852.

He was assistant of Edmund Landolt between 1875 and 1878.

He studied medicine in Limoges, and defended his doctoral thesis in Paris in 1877. His thesis was related to vision (French: La vision avec les diverses parties de la rétine).

In 1878, he was admitted together with Émile Léon Poincaré, to the new the chair of physics and medicine of the University of Nancy, Charpentier leading the physics part. He becomes full professor of medicine in 1879.

In 1888, he became the national correspondent of the physics and chemistry division for the Académie nationale de médecine.

In 1900, he attended and presented a paper at the first International Congress of Physics, during the Exposition Universelle, He replaced Jacques-Arsène d'Arsonval as chairman of the biophysics session.

He died in 1916, in his city of birth.

== Research ==
=== Vision ===
In 1891 he carried out the first experiment providing evidence of the size–weight illusion. He carried out a various number of procedures comparing what people thought was the heaviness of lifted weights. He realized that lifters thought that larger objects were lighter than smaller objects of the same mass.

Chapentier invented a differential photoptometer to study the sensibility of the retina to low intensity light. He studied the retinal oscillations (French: oscillations rétiniennes), term that he coined.

=== N-rays ===
Charpentier consecrated 15 papers to the study of the allegedly discovered N-rays. This radiation was discovered by Prosper-René Blondlot in Nancy and was largely studied there, but was later found to be illusory.

== Honors and awards ==
He was member of the French Academy of Sciences and the Académie nationale de médecine.

He earned the Buignet prize of the Académie nationale de médecine in 1883, the Montyon Prize by the French Academy of Science in 1885, and the La Caze prize 1901.

He was named officer of public instruction in 1890 and knight of the Legion of Honour in 1906.
