= Camille Gutton =

French physicist

- 1944 medallion of Camille Gutton by Georges Guiraud (1901–1989)
- Born: Camille Antoine Marie Guttton; 30 August 1872; Nancy, France
- Died: 19 August 1963 (aged 90); Saint-Nom-la-Bretèche, Yvelines, France
- Education: École normale supérieure University of Nancy
- Scientific career
- Fields: Physics
- Workplaces: University of Nancy
- Thesis: Recherches expérimentales sur le passage des ondes électriques d'un conducteur à un autre (1899)
- Doctoral advisor: Prosper-René Blondlot

Camille Gutton (30 August 1872 – 19 August 1963) was a French physicist who specialized in radioelectricity. He was responsible for various theoretical and practical advances. He followed some false leads such as research into the hypothetical N rays, which did not in fact exist, and attempts to explain anomalies in laboratory measurements of radio waves in ionized gases, which he thought might be due to positive ions exerting a quasi-elastic force on electrons. His work on very high frequency radio waves helped with the development of radar. He received various honours for his work, and in 1947 was a candidate for the Nobel Prize in Physics.

== Life ==
Camille Antoine Marie Guttton was born in Nancy on 30 August 1872. His father was an advocate at the Court of Appeal, and his maternal grandfather was Professor of Chemistry at the Nancy Faculty of Sciences. Camille Gutton was the oldest of five children in a close-knit family. His brother Henry Gutton^{(fr)} (1874–1963) became a prominent architect, known for his collaboration with Émile André. Camille studied at the Lycée de Nancy where his Latin and Greek teacher, M. Collignon, taught him to express his ideas clearly and precisely. He was accepted by the École normale supérieure in 1892, but first undertook his military service with an infantry regiment in Lorraine. He entered the École normale supérieure in 1893, and passed his agrégation in physics in 1896.

After obtaining his bachelor's degree Gutton joined the laboratory of Prosper-René Blondlot at the University of Nancy, where he studied Hertzian waves. His doctoral dissertation in 1899 described his measurements of these waves between two conductors, showing a slight difference between the phase and the group velocity. He defended his thesis on "Experimental research on the passage of electric waves from one conductor to another" at the Faculty of Sciences of Paris in 1899. Henri Poincaré wrote the report on his thesis. Several letters between Gutton and Poincaré between 1890 and 1910 have been preserved. Gutton remained in Nancy after obtaining his doctorate. In 1902 he was made Maître de Conférence at the Faculty of Science, and in 1906 Professor of Physics. He also lectured at the Nancy Institute of Electrical Engineering, where he became interested in engineering as opposed to pure science. He prepared a treatise on Current Generators and Electric Motors in 1911. He gradually became increasingly involved in radio research. From 1909 he worked in the laboratory on measuring the speed of visible light and radio waves.

Gutton was drafted into the Military Telegraph Service by the French army in 1915, and became the main assistant of Gustav Ferrié's team of young technicians working on tactical radio. The team made wireless telephony transmissions from Paris to Arlington, Virginia, developed direction finders and antennas, and engaged in radio espionage. Gutton made the first successful test in France of radio communications between aeroplanes and ground stations. In 1915 Gutton developed a 4 coil induction balance to detect unexploded shells in farmland of former battlefields in France. After the war many of the teams members became involved in civilian radio applications. Gutton returned to Nancy where he was made Professor of Physics, but remained a friend of Ferrié for life, and was secretary of the Société des Amis de la telégraphie sans fils (Wireless Telegraphy Society). While teaching and researching in Nancy he returned to Paris every week to teach courses at the École supérieure d'électricité, École supérieure de l'aéronautique and École supérieure de P.T.T.^{(fr)}.

In 1920 Gutton and Henri Abraham were chosen as "permanent collaborators" with the PTT administration. In the 1920s Gutton and his assistant Émile Pierret worked on communications with waves in the decimeter range, with much higher frequencies than those being explored in other countries, although with much lower power. In 1927 they showed that 16 cm waves could detect the presence of objects, the basis for radar. Gutton's 1927 experiments used Barkhausen–Kurz tubes at the focus of parabolic reflectors for oscillators or regenerative detectors. The results led Gutton to propose experiments on aeroplanes, which his son Henri Gutton's Société française radio-électrique conducted in 1934. Ferrié founded the Laboratoire Central de TSF in 1926 to support civil-military collaboration between the Ministry of War and the Post Office, later renamed to the Laboratoire national de radioelectricite. Gutton directed the National Laboratory of Radioelectricity from 1930.

Gutton retired in 1938, but continued to work in private. He became a free academic member of the French Academy of Sciences in 1938. The French Academy of Sciences awarded him the Henri Becquerel Prize in 1918 and the Kastner Boursault Prize in 1922, and made him Correspondent of the Physics Section in 1928. In 1933 he was made Correspondent of the Bureau of Longitudes. He was also appointed Commander of the Legion of Honour. In 1947 Gutton was nominated for the Nobel Prize in Physics by Prince Louis de Broglie.

Camille Gutton died in Paris on 19 August 1963 at the age of 90.

== Scientific work ==
Gutton's scientific work may be divided into three chronological phases. First, from 1896 to 1914 at Nancy he undertook important and meticulous studies of the properties of hertzian waves and the application of these properties to resolved problems of purely scientific concern. Next, from 1915 to 1919 as a member of the military radiotelegraphy team he applied his scientific knowledge to study of the properties of triodes, to improve the use of radio for communications, particularly in aviation, and to carry out advances that led to the growth broadcasting after the war. Finally, from 1919 to his retirement he was mainly concerned with research into radio transmission at very high frequencies.

Camille Gutton adapted techniques developed by Abraham and Jules Lemoine^{(fr)} in 1899 to compare the propagation times of light and of electric waves. Gutton measured the speed of propagation of electromagnetic waves in different media, which distinguished the theories of James Clerk Maxwell and Hermann von Helmholtz. Gutton's experimental results seemed to support Maxwell's theory. He followed his mentor Prosper-René Blondlot in the belief that N rays were real, and published works on this subject in opposition to Albert Turpain^{(fr)} until 1906. He designed apparatus for radio transmission by the Allied armies in World War I. He developed the first radio link between an aeroplane and the ground, and developed a highly sensitive electrometer.

In the early 1920s Gutton started to study the electrical properties of ionized media at different pressures and their effect on short wave propagation. In the 1910s and 1920s physicists and engineers tried to reproduce and measure in the laboratory the way that radio waves propagated in ionized gases in the ionosphere. They expected the effective dielectric constant (relative permittivity) to decrease with frequency due to the ionic refraction theory proposed by William Eccles and Joseph Larmor. They found that when frequency went down the measured dielectric constant went down as expected to a certain point, but then rose again. In the 1920s Gutton led a group of French scientists that called for a basic change to the equation of an electron's motion in an ionized gas. This was needed to explain the non-linear relationship between capacitance and ionization observed by Balthasar van der Pol. In the late 1920s Gutton and his followers said the effect might be due to a "quasi-elastic force" exerted by positive ions on electrons.

Gutton invited his son Henri and Jean Clément, his doctoral student at Nancy, to investigate the dielectric properties of ionized gases, and the two young men developed an apparatus in 1927 by which they could measure the dielectric constant of an ionized gas. In April 1930 Gutton performed experiments to test the theory of Peder Oluf Pedersen and Jørgen Rybner that resonance was an experimental artifact due to capacitance between a gas condenser's metal plates, and showed this was incorrect. He showed that the resonance was consistent with the quasi-elastic theory. Later Edward Victor Appleton and J. Goodier performed experiments which indicated that resonance was in fact an artifact due to confinement of the ionized gas in a finite space. Although their experiment did not show the Gutton's theory was completely invalid, it did show that at best it only applied in specific conditions. The Guttons and Clément did not challenge the finding and did not conduct further experiments on the dielectric constant of ionized gases.

== See also ==
- Multipactor effect

== Publications ==
Camille Gutton's publications included:

- Camille Gutton (1911), Génératrices de courant et moteurs électriques, introduction à l'étude de l'électro-technique appliquée (cours professé à l'Institut électrotechnique de l'Université de Nancy), Paris: H. Dunod et E. Pinat, p. 291
- Camille Gutton (March 1913), "Expériences sur la durée d'établissement de la biréfringence électrique", Journal de Physique: 12
- Camille Gutton (26 July 1915), "Sur une balance d'induction destinée à la recherche des obus enterrés dans les terrains à mettre en culture", Comptes Rendus: 71
- Camille Gutton (1921), Télégraphie et Téléphonie sans fil, Paris: A. Colin, p. 188
- Camille Gutton (23 July 1923), Société "Journal de physique" (ed.), La Lampe à trois electrodes, Paris: Impr. les Presses universitaires de France, p. 183
- Camille Gutton (25 November 1926), M. B. Blondel (ed.), Radiotechnique générale, Encyclopédie d'électricité industrielle, Saint-Amand/Paris: impr. Bussière / libr. J.-B. Baillière et fils, p. 572
- Camille Gutton (July–August 1930), "Sur les propriétés des gaz ionisés dans les champs électromagnétiques de haute fréquence", Annales de Physique, 10 (14): 14, Bibcode:1930AnPh...10....6G, doi:10.1051/anphys/193010140006
- Camille Gutton (11 June 1930), Les ondes électriques de très courtes longueurs et leurs applications (conférence faite au Conservatoire national des arts et métiers, le 6 mai 1930), Paris: Hermann, p. 20
- Camille Gutton (16 April 1934), Lignes téléphoniques, Paris: Gauthier-Villars, p. 48
- Camille Gutton (15 January 1937), Leçons de radioélectricité, Saint-Amand/Paris: impr. R. Bussière / Léon Eyrolles, p. 196

== Sources ==
- Broglie, Louis de (13 December 1965), Notice sur la via et l'oeuvre de Camille Gutton (PDF) (in French), Académie des sciences
- Brown, L (1999-01-01), Technical and Military Imperatives: A Radar History of World War 2, CRC Press, ISBN 978-1-4200-5066-0
- Cagnac, Bernard (2009), "Henri Abraham", Les Trois Physiciens : Henri Abraham, Eugène Bloch, Georges Bruhat, fondateurs du Laboratoire de physique de l'École normale supérieure (in French), Paris: Éditions Rue d’Ulm, pp. 5–35, doi:10.4000/books.editionsulm.756, ISBN 9782821829763
- Camille Gutton (1872–1963) (in French), BnF: Bibliotheque nationale de France
- "Camille Gutton", Nomination Database, Nobel Media AB, 2014
- Chen-Pang Yeang (2013-07-02), Probing the Sky with Radio Waves: From Wireless Technology to the Development of Atmospheric Science, University of Chicago Press, ISBN 978-0-226-01519-4
- Galati, Gaspare (2015-09-15), 100 Years of Radar, Springer, ISBN 978-3-319-00584-3
- Rollet, Laurent (2017-05-22), La correspondance de jeunesse d'Henri Poincaré: Les années de formation. De l'École polytechnique à l'École des Mines (1873-1878), Birkhäuser, ISBN 978-3-319-55959-9
- Walter, S.; Bolmont, É.; Coret, A., eds. (2007), "Camille Gutton", La correspondance entre Henri Poincaré et les physiciens, chimistes et ingénieurs, Publications des Archives Henri-Poincaré / Publications of the Henri Poincaré Archives (in French), Birkhäuser Basel, pp. 172–182, doi:10.1007/978-3-7643-8303-9_29, ISBN 978-3-7643-8303-9
