= Electronic shelf label =

Automatically updating retail label

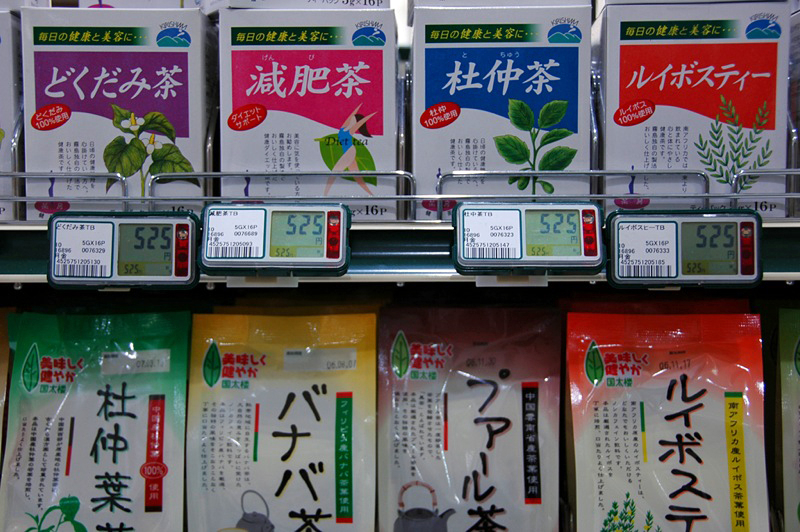
Electronic shelf labels in Tokyo

An electronic shelf label (ESL) is a digital price tag used by retailers for displaying product pricing that can automatically be updated or changed under the control of a central computer server.

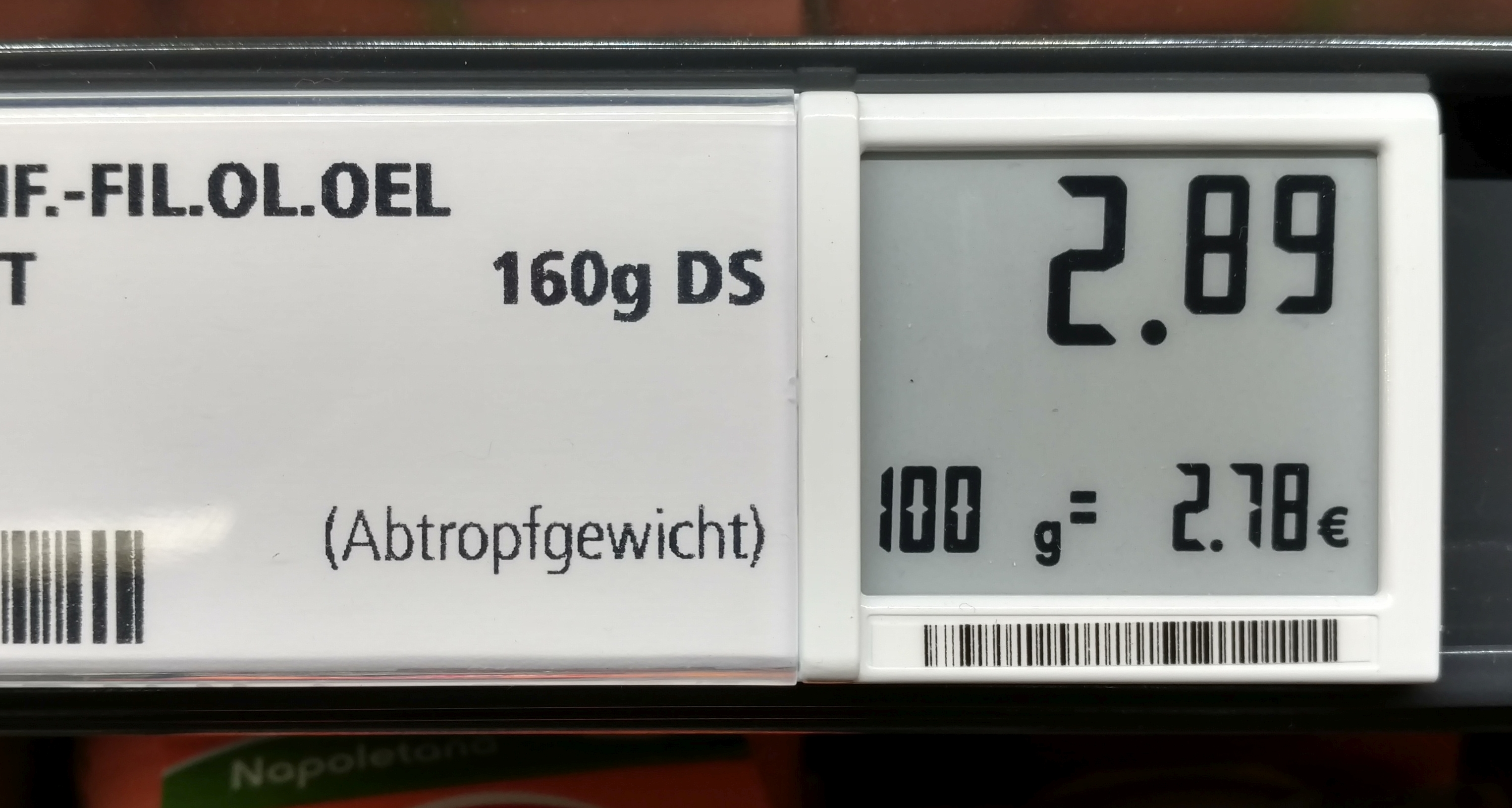
A shelf label with an electronic paper display

ESL modules use electronic paper (e-paper) or liquid-crystal displays (LCDs) to show the current product price to the customer, typically on the front edge of retail shelving. E-paper is widely used on ESLs as it provides a crisp display and supports full graphic images (typically only black and white) while only needing power during updates, and no power to retain an image. A communication network from the central computer server allows the price display to be automatically updated whenever a product price is changed, in contrast to static paper placards. Wireless communication is needed and must support appropriate range, speed, and reliability. The means of wireless communication can be based on radio, infrared or even visible light communication.

== History ==
=== Early product ===
An early system first offered for sale by National Cash Register (NCR) in 1997 used modulated backscatter of radio waves to provide two way wireless communications between the labels and the store's radio network. By using modulated backscatter, the labels confirmed receipt of price changes (along with battery and display status) without the need for an active radio transmitter, thus saving cost and increasing battery life to over 5 years.

=== LCD and infrared communication ===
7-segment LCD ESL tags use a display similar to how a calculator displays the numerical values. The numerical value to display on the tags itself are then shown based on activating different combinations of these seven bars and segments. A disadvantage of using a liquid crystal display tags is difficulty in displaying certain letters. The communication technology used for the transmitter to connect to the label is through diffused infrared communication. The values on the LCD tags are established by infrared bouncing off from surfaces. The transmission speed compromised by the bouncing is counteracted by data compression. Another disadvantage is that LCDs need power to retain an image.

=== E-paper and infrared or radio communication ===
Electronic paper (e-paper, electronic ink, or e-ink) describes a technology that mimics the appearance of ordinary ink on paper. An e-paper display is made up of multiple capsules in a thin film with electrodes placed above and below the capsule film, and when an electric charge is applied to an individual electrode, the color particle moves to either the top or bottom of the capsule, allowing the ESL to display certain intensities of color within the capsule. E-paper generally uses an infrared or radio communication network to communicate from the central transmitter to the tags. Typically, low frequency radio transmission is used for tags, but the radio transmission has a disadvantage of a low bandwidth that makes it difficult to show complex segmented images.

=== Geo-location and product finders ===
By 2016, ESLs used e-paper display technology and radio communications, integrated with existing retail technologies such as electronic article surveillance, digital signage, and people counters. Once retailers upload a floor plan of the sales area into the label-management software, consumers can be automatically tracked (in real time) through the network of people-counting devices, or via their personal Bluetooth devices. This allows the software to determine the consumer's position within the store and subject the consumer to targeted, customized marketing initiatives, such as discounts, or individual pricing.

== Design ==
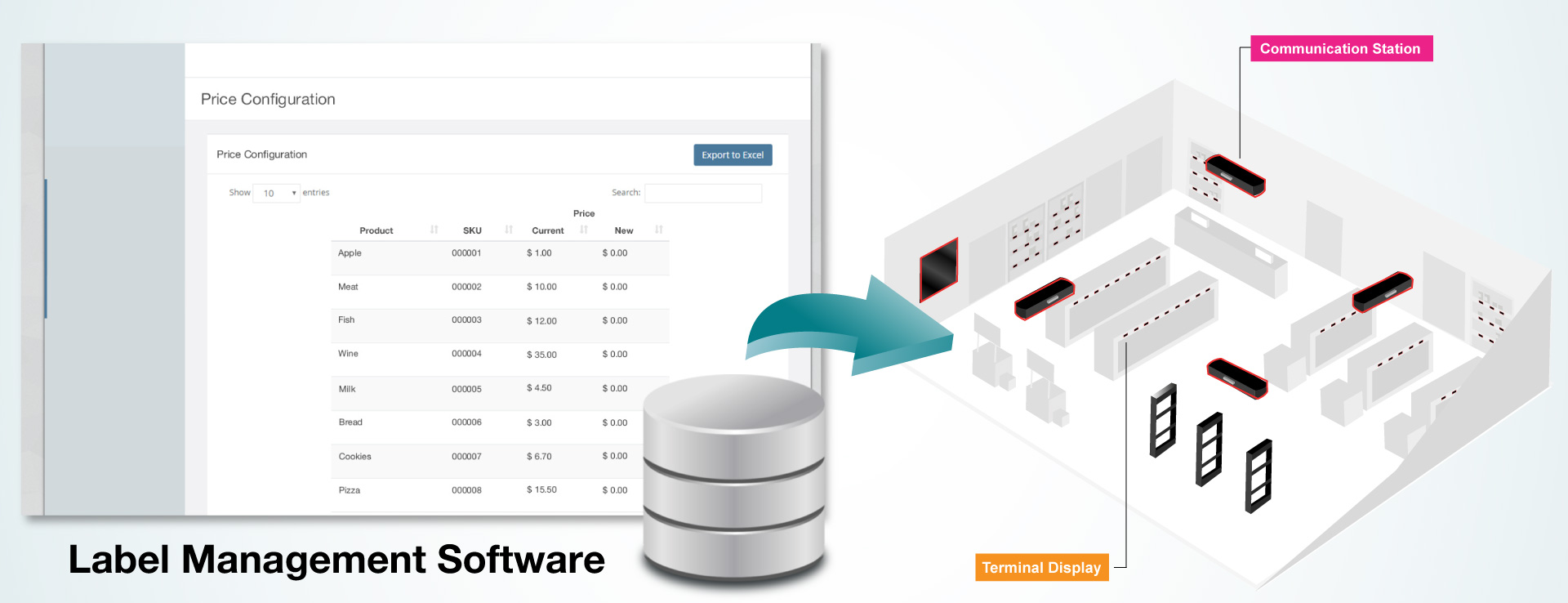
Concept display of the connection between the label management software, communication station, and terminal display in a mock-up retail environment

A typical ESL utilizes ultra-low-power CPU and wireless communication solutions to meet low power of low cost constraints in order to displace the high number of static shelf labels required in an average retail store. ESLs consist of three components: a label management software, a communication station, and terminal displays.

The label management software is responsible for the configuration of the system, configuration of the properties on the label itself, and to store the database for the list of prices. The software mainly covers the network management, file systems, and transmission of data. Also processes and packs the data of product information and the prices configured into packets of information. The data packets are then sent to the communication station via wireless network. Typically, a centralized software that is responsible for the building of and maintenance of the network for the data communication between the label management software and the terminal display.

The communication station is responsible for the stability and reliability of transmittance through a long distance from the label management software to the label. The wireless communication must support application range, speed, battery life, and reliability. The means of wireless communication can be based on radio, infrared or even visible light communication.

Terminal displays function as receivers from the communication station to display the price configured from the label management software. The terminal display label will then act based on the instructions that was given in the data packets.

=== Hardware design ===
ESL hardware design generally includes the circuit design of both the communication station and the terminal display label. The typical chipset used to perform the basic functional requirement of ESLs is the TI MSP432. Typical communication between the communication station and the terminal display label is controlled by a RF module; the general protocol uses CC2500 with a communication distance of upwards of 30 meters (98 ft). For terminal display, it can be displayed via electronic ink, electronic paper or liquid crystal display.

=== Software design ===
An ESL software API is included in the Bluetooth 5.4 specification, which permits a 7-bit group identifier of 8-bit unique ESL IDs, allowing for a total of 32,640 ESLs to be allocated for one Bluetooth ESL network. Multiple Bluetooth ESL networks may be necessary in the same location to cover typical (e.g. grocery store) ESL applications.

== Usage ==
Electronic shelf labels are primarily used by retailers who sell their products in stores and are usually attached to the front edge of the retail shelves and display the price of the product. Additional information such as stock levels, expiration dates, or product information may also be displayed as well, depending on the type of ESL.

Automated ESL systems can reduce pricing management labor costs, improve inventory management, and allow for dynamic and surveillance pricing, in which retailers can fluctuate pricing to match demand, online competition, inventory levels, shelf-life of items, and create promotions. An analysis by the AFL-CIO Tech Institute estimated that universal adoption of ESLs in the United States would result in 44,223 to 191,633 fewer jobs.

Some ESL providers integrate with Bluetooth Low Energy-enabled devices to surveil the movement of consumers based on the detection of responses from high traffic areas through Bluetooth.

=== Market trends ===
The global ESL market throughout 2027 is forecast to grow more than 16% CAGR. The wide range of users ranges from grocery stores, hardware stores, sports equipment, furniture, consumer appliances, and electronic and gadgets. Forecast growth is primarily due to reduction in pricing over time.

With the rapid increase in the inclusion of Internet of things technology in the retail industry, over 79% of retailers in the North America alone expect to invest in ESL and people counters. 72% of these retailers in North America have plans to reinvent the supply chain management through adoption of ESL in their stores, thereby accelerating the market growth of ESL. Further studies show that Europe currently dominates the ESL market in terms of size, with over one-third of the total market share in 2017, due to the strong presence of domestic and multinational retailers in the region, Vusion, Diebold Nixdorf AG, and Displaydata. However the market in APAC is expected to grow at the highest CAGR within the forecast period. The ESL market in the APAC region is segmented into territories with significant market potential, China, Japan, Australia, Singapore, South Korea, and the rest of the region. Additionally, growth focuses on the expansion of large scale retailers in the region. A study led by ABI Research states the global ESL market could reach US$2 billion by 2019 (actual achieved marketshare in 2019 of $631 million), but a further study led by Fortune Business Isights expect the ESL market to reach $2.85 billion by 2027.
