= Price tag =

Label declaring the price of an item for sale

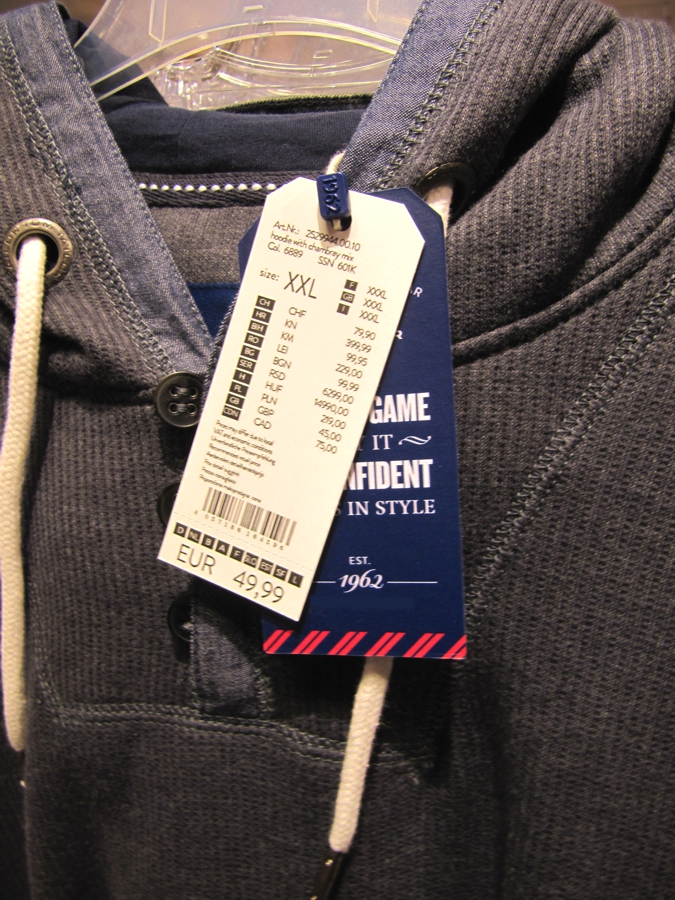
A price tag on a garment in a German clothing store

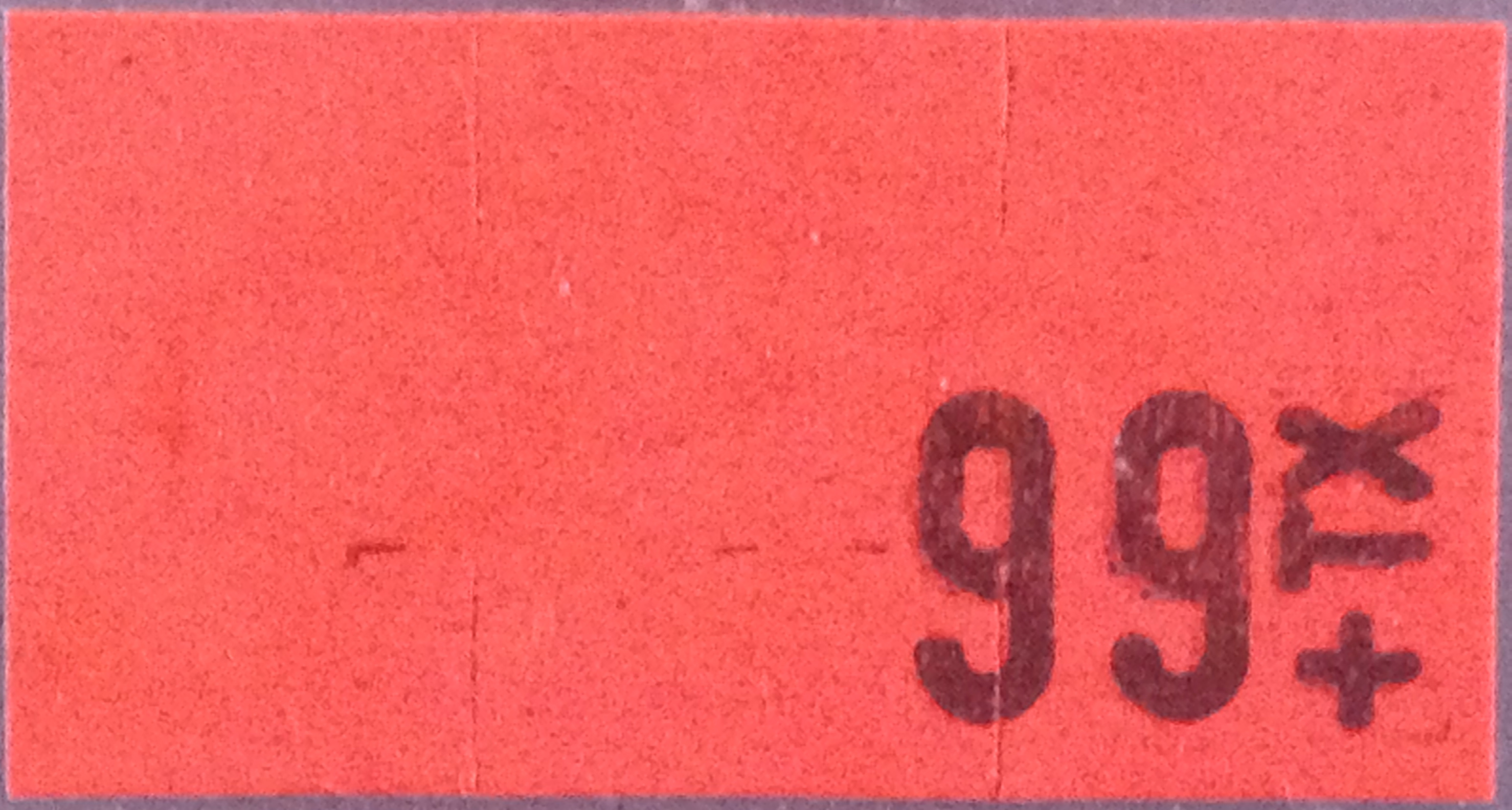
Typical price tag with security cuts, for 99¢ + tax

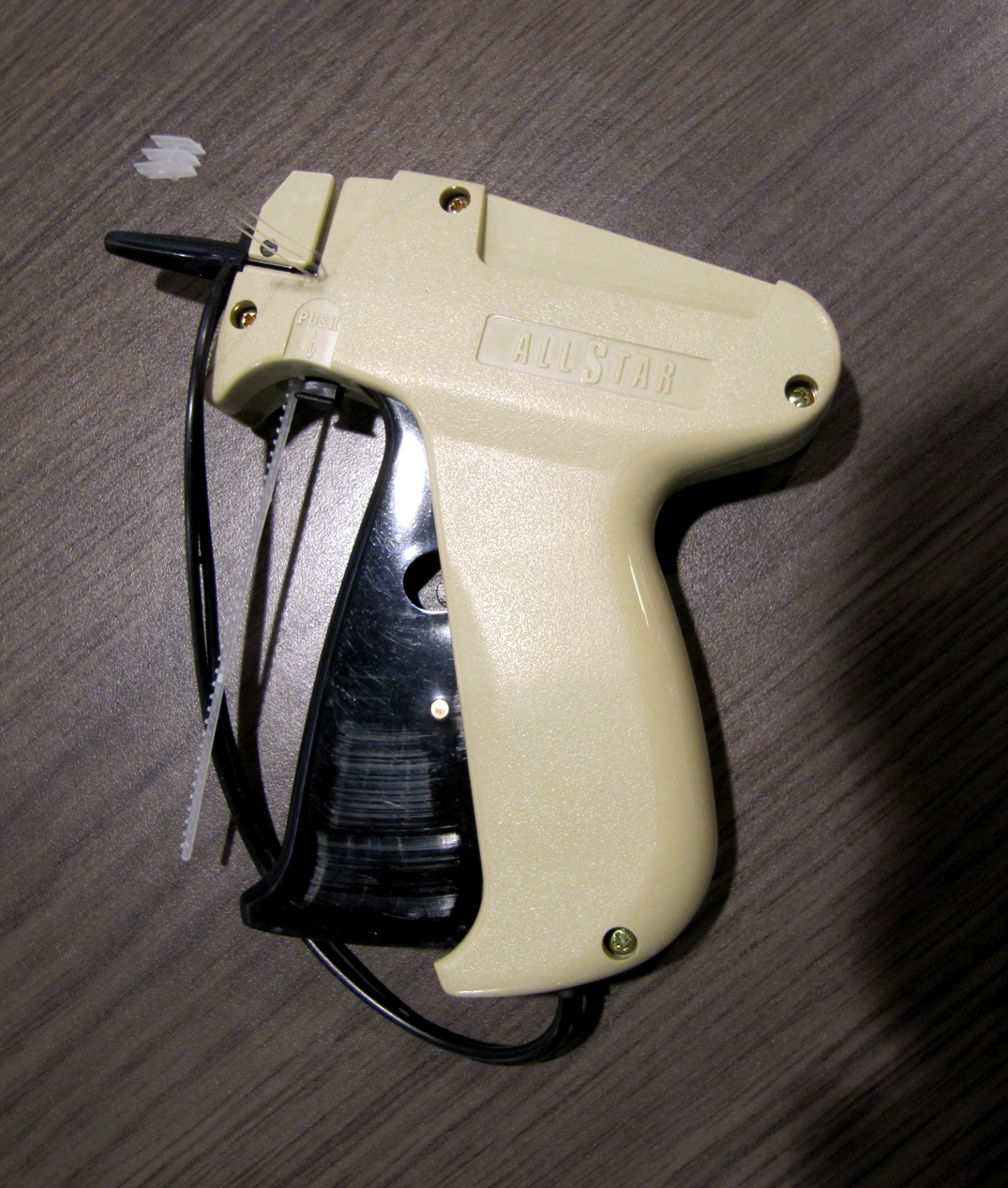
A price tag gun

A price tag is a label declaring the price of an item for sale. It may be a sticker or attached by twist tie or other means such as a tag gun. Stationary price tags on shelves or walls are increasingly electronic shelf labels.

Some jurisdictions require items (possibly exceptions for bulk good and produce) to be individually marked with the price, or have shelf tags or barcode scanners available so customers can determine prices without consulting store staff. In some cases, unit price is also required.

Tagging guns which use plastic toggles to attach price tags to clothing are sometimes known as "Kimball guns".

An electronic shelf label in Russia

Some jurisdictions also outlaw price discrimination except for different quantities (e.g. quantity discounts are allowed) or different types of customers (e.g. individuals vs. organizations that might be expected to buy in bulk or have better creditworthiness). For example, the 1936 Robinson–Patman Act outlaws this practice in the United States.

Many price tags also bear the name of the store.

== History ==
Before the late 19th century, in most cases, retail goods did not have a fixed price, and each customer would be expected to haggle with the store clerk. The Quakers, who found it immoral for different customers to pay different prices (now known as price discrimination), were an exception.

The Pennsylvania Quakers" "honest price" was institutionalized in 1874 by John Wanamaker, when he opened his eponymous department store in Philadelphia. A renowned innovator of the highest integrity, Wanamaker was the first retailer to offer money-back guarantees. He also invented the price tag: "A devout Christian, he believed that if everyone was equal before God, then everyone should be equal before price." Before Wanamaker's, every purchase was open to a haggle.

Macy's in New York (Rowland Hussey Macy was a Quaker) also began affixing physical tags to items in the 1870s, eliminating haggling. This allowed shorter training time for new clerks (who would no longer need to know the art of haggling nor the range of accepted prices for every item) and allowed clerks to serve more customers.

Even large stores kept goods behind a counter, requiring clerks to fetch items for customers. The Piggly Wiggly chain of grocery stores was the first to become self-service in 1916, further cementing the need for price tags. Price tags soon became commonplace in Western retail stores, and haggling rare outside of proprietors and individuals selling used items.

== See also ==
- Dynamic pricing, a modern counter-trend to constant pricing
- Bargaining
