= Unit price information in supermarkets =

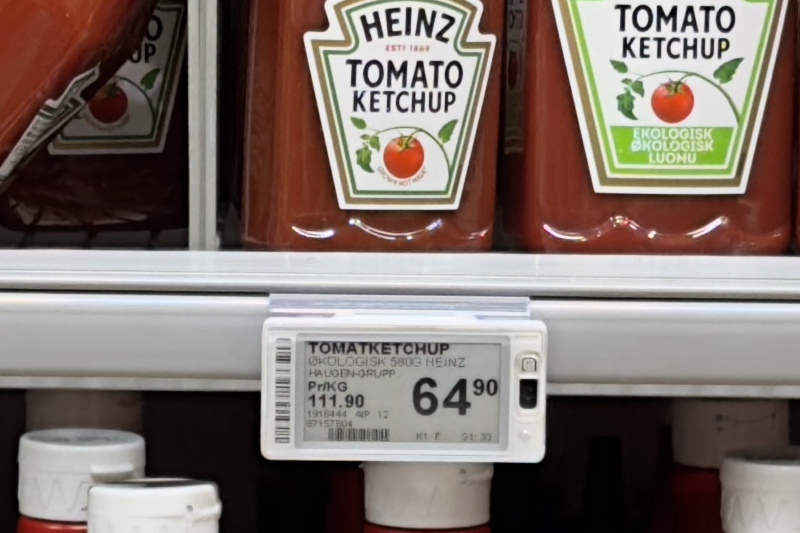
In this Norwegian grocery store, the price for a bottle of ketchup is displayed in terms of the price paid per package (64.90 kr) and the price paid per kilogram (111.90 kr). this allows customers to know how much they will pay and to quickly compare products that have different sizes of packages.

Unit price information printed on supermarket shelf labels (price tickets) illustrates the quantity of product by a unit of measure (price per 100 g, price per 100 ml).

Unit pricing was originally designed as a device to enable customers to make comparisons between grocery products of different sizes and brand, thereby enabling informed purchase decisions. The provision of prescribed product quantities enables supermarket shoppers to discriminate intelligently between competing goods of different shapes and sizes.

There remains debate about the extent of consumer awareness, understanding and adoption of this information. It is argued that as a measure of a consumer's understanding of unit pricing, comprehension is richer in content and thus reveals more information compared to awareness. Although higher levels of awareness is self reported, only 56% of shoppers could provide satisfactory descriptions of how to use unit price information. The difference between reported awareness and comprehension is often large.

Unit pricing was implemented into British, European Union and North American markets during the early 1970s. In December 2009, the Australian federal government implemented Trade Price legislation to force all large supermarkets and groceries stores to display unit pricing information on shelf labels (s.51AE, Trade Practices Act 1974).

As products have become qualitatively diverse, comprising various ply constructions, densities and concentrations, consumer awareness and usage of unit price information continues to hold academic interest.(Jarratt 2007; Kachersky 2011; Diaz 2011).

The benefits of unit pricing have been widely reported in the literature. It has been argued that unit pricing reduces time spent comparing brands, eliminates confusion relating to price calculations and ultimately allows shoppers to save money at the register. Unit pricing enables the consumers to rationally evaluate the most economic package size and brand. Accordingly, the time spent determining the most economic purchase is condensed substantially, errors in product price comparisons are significantly reduced, and importantly, lower grocery shopping expenditure is attained. In Australia, despite having unit pricing legislation, there were no adequate education programs to enable consumers to take advantage of unit pricing.

Research indicates that when consumers are educated about unit pricing they can show around 17-18% savings in shopping expenditure, but that this can often drop back somewhat across time

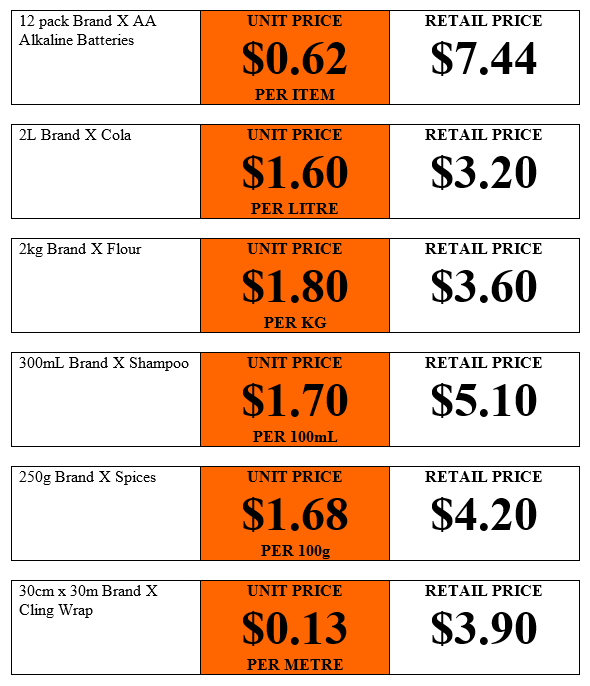
Example of unit pricing formats used in supermarkets.
