= Bulk purchasing =

Purchasing large quantities for a low unit price

Bulk purchasing or mass buying is the purchase of much larger quantities than the usual, for a unit price that is lower than the usual.

Wholesaling is selling goods in large quantities at a low unit price to retail merchants. The wholesaler will accept a slightly lower sales price for each unit, if the retailer will agree to purchase a much greater quantity of units, so the wholesaler can maximize profit. A wholesaler usually represents a factory where goods are produced. The factory owners can use economy of scale to increase profit as the quantity sold increases.

Retailing is buying goods in a wholesale market to sell them in small quantities at higher prices to consumers. Part of this profit is justified by logistics, the useful distribution function of the retailer, who delivers the goods to consumers and divides those large quantities of goods into many smaller units suitable for many transactions with many small parties of consumers. Retailers can also benefit from economy of scale to increase profit, just like a wholesaler does.

Bulk purchasing is when a consumer captures part of the benefits of economy of scale by doing with the retailer what the retailer does with the wholesaler: paying a lower price per unit in exchange for purchasing much larger quantities. This allows the consumer to satisfy more of his or her demands at a lower total cost by acquiring more use value per dollar spent.

Research has shown that simply displaying the per-unit price for an item sold in bulk would increase the adoption of bulk buying among lower-income families. This population cohort stands to reduce their supermarket expenditures by 5 percent if bulk purchasing is adopted at similar levels as higher-income cohorts.

Consumer demand for savings by bulk purchase has led to the success of big-box stores. Although affected by marginal cost, the total cost does not increase.

Bulk purchasing also enables greater resilience, such that bulk buyers are able to build stockpiles of necessities. During the COVID-19 pandemic, bulk purchasing also contributed to better health outcomes by decreasing the overall number of trips to the grocery store, thus lessening opportunities for exposure to SARS-CoV-2. Since lower-income individuals were less likely to participate in bulk buying, this likely contributed to socioeconomic-related health inequalities during the pandemic.

The bulk buying of perishables must be carefully planned and calibrated since per-unit savings can be erased if consumers purchase an excessive amount of a particular product and it spoils before it can be consumed or otherwise used.

== Music industry ==
In the music industry, bulk purchasing is one of the illegal practices used to manipulate record charts, beside payola and streaming fraud. In South Korea, this practice is known as sajaegi (사재기). The term is generally used to refer to illegal bulk purchases of any item, but in the music industry, specifically refers to boosting chart rankings through unethical or illegal means.

The term specifically refers to artists or their agencies engaging in manipulative bulk buying, rather than bulk purchasing schemes orchestrated by fans. Nonetheless, some bulk purchasing initiatives led by artists' fans were also accused of being unethical . One controversial case is Dynamite by BTS. The band's fans (called "ARMY") created large fundraisers (or donations) totaling roughly $40,000, according to Paper. Paper also stated that Blackpink's fans, BLINK, raised funds upwards of $10,000 to buy Blackpink's first album, The Album. Other artists cited by Paper for such activities included Stray Kids, Taylor Swift, Harry Styles, Justin Bieber, and Miley Cyrus.

Chart manipulation has been a controversial topic in South Korea. South Korea's Ministry of Culture banned midnight releases altogether, in order to avoid chart manipulation.

Additionally, to stop fan-orchestrated chart manipulation, Billboard introduced new rules in 2022 mainly targeting the Billboard Hot 100. Only one digital sale will be counted per customer per week for songs and albums after the rule change. Bulk purchases of two or more will not be counted.

== See also ==
- Bulk sale
