= Size–weight illusion =

Perceptional illusion

The size–weight illusion, also known as the Charpentier illusion, is named after the French physician Augustin Charpentier because he was the first to demonstrate the illusion experimentally. It is also called De Moor's illusion, named after Belgian physician Jean Demoor (1867–1941).

== Description ==
The illusion occurs when a person underestimates the weight of a larger object (e.g. a box) when compared to a smaller object of the same mass. The illusion also occurs when the objects are not lifted against gravity, but accelerated horizontally, so it should be called a size-mass illusion. Similar illusions occurs with differences in material and colour: metal containers feel lighter than wooden containers of the same size and mass, and darker objects feel heavier than brighter objects of the same size and mass. These illusions have all been described as contrast with the expected weight, although the size-weight illusion occurs independent of visual estimates of the volume of material and the illusion does not depend on expectations, but occurs also if visual size information is only provided while already lifting. The expected weight or density can be measured by matching visible and hidden weights, lifted in the same manner. This gives an expected density of about 1.7 for metal canisters and 0.14 for polystyrene blocks. Density expectations may assist in selecting suitable objects to throw.

== Explanation ==
An early explanation of these illusions was that people judge the weight of an object from its appearance and then lift it with a pre-determined force. They expect a larger object to be heavier and therefore lift it with greater force: the larger object is then lifted more easily than the smaller one, causing it to be perceived as lighter. This hypothesis was disproved by an experiment in which two objects of the same mass, same cross section, but different height were placed on observers' supported hands, and produced a passive size–weight illusion. Recent studies have also shown that the lifting force quickly adapts to the true mass of the objects, but the size–weight illusion remains. The illusion therefore cannot be explained by the manner of lifting, and must be due to some perceptual rescaling based on prior expectations. The rescaling has been described as sub-optimal (anti-Bayesian), in that the central nervous system integrates prior expectations with current proprioceptive information in a way that emphasises the unexpected information rather than taking an average of all information. It has also recently been suggested that the illusion may not be anti-Bayesian, but may instead rely on more complex yet still optimal inference processes than traditionally suggested.

Other models describe the rescaling as partly beneficial, in that it enhances discrimination. Contrast effects are common in many perceptual modalities, and are similar to physiological adaptation. Adaptation can be explained as a change in the gain of the system, the gain being set to the appropriate level for maximum discrimination and for protection against sensory overload. Contrast effects may similarly be related to efficient neural coding. If the selected range is either too high or too low, as in the size–weight illusion, there is both a contrast illusion and a loss of discrimination. It has been found that weight discrimination deteriorates if objects are lighter than their expected density, or heavier than their expected density. Models of this type can account for perceptual rescaling without involving the manner of lifting.

It has also been demonstrated that, taking three empty matchboxes, and putting a weight in one of them, the weighted box lifted on its own feels heavier than all three boxes lifted together with the heavy one on top.

== See also ==
- Shrinkflation
