= Seven-segment display character representations =

The individual segments of a seven-segment display

The various shapes of numerical digits, letters, and punctuation on seven-segment displays is not standardized by any relevant entity (e.g. ISO, IEEE or IEC). Unicode provides encoding codepoint for segmented digits in Unicode 13.0 in Symbols for Legacy Computing block.

== Digit ==
Digits
	1	2	3	4	5	6	7	8	9
U+1FBF0	U+1FBF1	U+1FBF2	U+1FBF3	U+1FBF4	U+1FBF5	U+1FBF6	U+1FBF7	U+1FBF8	U+1FBF9

Two basic conventions are in common use for some Arabic numerals: display segment A is optional for digit 6 (/), segment F for 7 (/), and segment D for 9 (/). Although EF could also be used to represent digit 1, this seems to be rarely done if ever. (It is done on pedestrian countdown signals for the tens [left] digit, likely to allow more space between the two digits, for numbers 10-19.) CDEG is occasionally encountered on older calculators to represent 0.

In Unicode 13.0, 10 codepoints had been given for segmented digits 0–9 in the Symbols for Legacy Computing block:

Symbols for Legacy Computing^{[1]}^{[2]} Official Unicode Consortium code chart (PDF)
	0	1	2	3	4	5	6	7	8	9	A	B	C	D	E	F
U+1FBFx	🯰	🯱	🯲	🯳	🯴	🯵	🯶	🯷	🯸	🯹						
Notes 1.As of Unicode version 13.0 2.Grey areas indicate non-assigned code points

== Alphabet ==
In addition to the ten digits, seven-segment displays can be used to show most letters of the Latin, Cyrillic and Greek alphabets including punctuation.

Example set of Roman letters
Uppercase	A	B	C	D	E	F	G	H	I	J	K	L	M	N	O	P	Q	R	S	T	U	V	W	X	Y	Z
Lowercase	a	b	c	d	e	f	g	h	i	j	k	l	m	n	o	p	q	r	s	t	u	v	w	x	y	z
Punctuation	"	'	eq	-	_	sp	%	^	:	;	/	\	`	<	>	#	{	}	[	uk2	(	)

One such special case is the display of the letters A–F when denoting the hexadecimal values (digits) 10–15. These are needed on some scientific calculators, and are used with some testing displays on electronic equipment. Although there is no official standard, today most devices displaying hex digits use the unique forms shown to the right: uppercase A, lowercase b, uppercase C, lowercase d, uppercase E and F. To avoid ambiguity between the digit 6 and the letter b the digit 6 is displayed with segment A lit.

However, this modern scheme was not always followed in the past, and various other schemes could be found as well:

- The Texas Instruments seven-segment display decoder chips 7446/7447/7448/7449 and 74246/74247/74248/74249 and the Siemens FLH551-7448/555-8448 chips used truncated versions of "2", "3", "4", "5" and "6" for digits A–G. Digit F (1111 binary) was blank.
- Soviet programmable calculators like the Б3-34 instead used the symbols "−", "L", "C", "Г", "E", and " " (space) to display hexadecimal numbers above nine. (The Б3-34 character set allowed for a cross-alphabet display of the English word "Error" as either EГГ0Г or 3ГГ0Г, depending on the error, in all-numeric form during error messages.)
- Not all 7-segment decoders were suitable to display digits above nine at all. For comparison, the National Semiconductor MM74C912 displayed "o" for A and B, "−" for C, D and E, F, and blank for G.
- The CD4511 even just displayed blanks.
- The Magic Black Box, an electronic version of the Magic 8 Ball toy, used a ROM to generate 64 different 16-character alphanumeric messages on a LED display. It could not generate K, M, V, W, and X but it could generate a question mark.

For the remainder of characters, ad hoc and corporate solutions dominate the field of using seven-segment displays to show general words and phrases. Such applications of seven-segment displays are usually not considered essential and are only used for basic notifications on consumer electronics appliances (as is the case of this article's example phrases), and as internal test messages on equipment under development. Certain letters (M, V, W, X in the Latin alphabet) cannot be expressed unambiguously at all due to either diagonal strokes, more than two vertical strokes, or inability to distinguish them from other letters, while others can only be expressed in either capital form or lowercase form but not both. The Nine-segment display, fourteen-segment display, sixteen-segment display or dot matrix display are more commonly used for hardware that requires the display of messages that are more than trivial.

== Examples ==
The following phrases come from a portable media player's seven-segment display. They give a good illustration of an application where a seven-segment display may be sufficient for displaying letters, since the relevant messages are neither critical nor in any significant risk of being misunderstood, much due to the limited number and rigid domain specificity of the messages. As such, there is no direct need for a more expressive display, in this case, although even a slightly wider repertoire of messages would require at least a 14-segment display or a dot matrix one.

16×8-grid showing the 128 states of a seven-segment display

On	o n	Off	O F
Open	O P E N	Close	C L O S E
Play	P L A Y	Pause	P A U S E
Stop	S t o P	Error	E r o
CD	C d	MP3	M P 3
FM	F M	USB	U S b
List	L I S t	Shuffle	S H U F L E
Mode	M o d E	Wait	W A I t
Half	H A L F	Truffle	t r u F L E
Pacify	P A C I F Y	Oil	O I L
Photo	P h o t	Inn	i# n
Help	H E L P	Escape	E S C A P
Juice	J U I C E	Jungle	J u n G L E

At least one Major League Baseball team uses a seven-segment display in the scoreboard to indicate the fielding position of the player currently at bat (using abbreviations instead of position numbers):

Pitcher (if pitcher bats)	P	Catcher	C	Designated hitter	d H
1st base	1 b	2nd base	2 b	Shortstop	S	3rd base	3 b
Left field	L F	Center field	C F	Right field	r F

== See also ==
7, 9, 14, 16 segment displays shown side by side

- Calculator spelling
- New Alphabet
