= Lucien Poincaré =

French physicist (1862–1920)

- Born: 22 July 1862; Bar-le-Duc, Meuse, France
- Died: 9 March 1920 (aged 57); Paris
- Relatives: Raymond Poincaré (brother); Henri Poincaré (cousin)
- Scientific career
- Fields: Physics
- Workplaces: Ministry of Public Instruction, France; Academie de Paris

Lucien Poincaré (22 July 1862 – 9 March 1920) was a French physicist.

== Biography ==
Poincaré was born at Bar-le-Duc July 22, 1862. After a distinguished academic career he became in succession inspector general of physical science in 1902, director of secondary education at the Ministry of Public Instruction in 1910, director of higher education in 1914 and rector of the Academie de Paris in 1917. In that capacity he received President Wilson at the Sorbonne on the occasion of his visit to Paris for the Peace Conference. He was the brother of French Prime Minister Raymond Poincaré and cousin of mathematician and theoretical physicist Henri Poincaré.

Poincaré died in Paris March 9, 1920.

== Selected publications ==
- La physique moderne, son évolution. Paris: Flammarion, Bibliothèque de philosophie scientifique, 1906, 1920 edition
  - The New Physics and its Evolution. London: Kegan Paul, Trench, Trübner, & Company. 1907. ISBN 978-1-4219-4764-8; authorised translation
- L'Électricité. Flammarion, Bibliothèque de philosophie scientifique, 1907, Archive
- Éducation, Science, Patrie. Flammarion, Bibliothèque de philosophie scientifique, 1926.
