= Unit price =

Average price of a product

A product's average price is the result of dividing the product's total sales revenue by the total units sold. When one product is sold in variants, such as bottle sizes, managers must define "comparable" units. Average prices can be calculated by weighting different unit selling prices by the percentage of unit sales (mix) for each product variant. If we use a standard, rather than an actual mix of sizes and product varieties, the result is price per statistical unit. Statistical units are also called equivalent units.

Average price per unit and prices per statistical unit are needed by marketers who sell the same product in different packages, sizes, forms, or configurations at a variety of different prices. As in analyses of different channels, these product and price variations must be reflected accurately in overall average prices. If they are not, marketers may lose sight of what is happening to prices and why. If the price of each product variant remained unchanged, for example, but there was a shift in the mix of volume sold, then the average price per unit would change, but the price per statistical unit would not. Both of these metrics have value in identifying market movements. In a survey of nearly 200 senior marketing managers, 51 percent responded that they found the "average price per unit" metric very useful in managing and monitoring their businesses, while only 16% found "price per statistical unit" very useful.

In retail, unit price is the price for a single unit of measure of a product sold in more or less than the single unit. The "unit price" tells the buyer the cost per pound, quart, or other unit of weight or volume of a food package. It is usually posted on the shelf below the food. The shelf tag shows the total price (item price) and price per unit (unit price) for the food item. Research suggests that unit price information in supermarkets can lead shoppers to save around 17-18% when they are educated on how to use it, but that this figure drops off over time.

Unit price is also a valuation method for buyers who purchase in bulk. Buyer seeks to purchase 10000 widgets. Seller One offers 1000 widgets packaged together for $5000. Seller Two offers 5000 widgets packaged together for $25000. Seller Three offers 500 widgets packaged together for $2000. All three sellers can offer a total of 10000 widgets to Buyer. Seller One offers widgets at a unit price of $5. Seller Two offers widgets at a unit price of $5. Seller Three offers widgets at a unit price of $4. Buyer uses unit price to value the packages offered by each of the three sellers and finds that Seller Three offers widgets at the best value, the best price.

Unit price is a common form of valuation in sales contract for goods sold in bulk purchasing.

The stock price of securities is a form of unit price because securities including capital stocks are often sold in bulks comprising many units.

Unit price is also often used in the trade of consumable energy resources.

== Purpose ==
Price per unit metrics allow marketers to "calculate meaningful average selling prices within a product line that includes items of different sizes."

Many brands or product lines include multiple models, versions, flavors, colors, sizes, or — more generally – stock-keeping units (SKUs). Brita water filters, for example, are sold in a number of SKUs. They are sold in single-filter packs, double-filter packs, and special banded packs that may be restricted to club stores. They are sold on a standalone basis and in combination with pitchers. These various packages and product forms may be known as SKUs, models, items, and so on.

The information gleaned from a price per statistical unit can be helpful in considering price movements within a market. Price per statistical unit, in combination with unit price averages, provides insight into the degree to which the average prices in a market are changing as a result of shifts in 'mix' – proportions of sales generated by differently priced SKUs – versus price changes for individual items. Alterations in mix – such as a relative increase in the sale of larger versus smaller ice cream tubs at retail grocers, for example – will affect average unit price, but not price per statistical unit. Pricing changes in the SKUs that make up a statistical unit, however, will be reflected by a change in the price of that statistical unit.

== Construction ==
Average price per unit As with other marketing averages, average price per unit can be calculated either from company totals or from the prices and shares of individual SKUs."

Average Price per Unit ($) = Revenue ($) / Units Sold
or
Average Price per Unit ($) = [Price of SKU 1 ($) * SKU 1 Percentage of Sales (%)] + [Price of SKU 2 ($) * SKU 2 Percentage of Sales (%)] + . . .

The average price per unit depends on both unit prices and unit sales of individual SKUs. The average price per unit can be driven upward by a rise in unit prices, or by an increase in the unit shares of higher-priced SKUs, or by a combination of the two. An 'average' price metric that is not sensitive to changes in SKU shares is the price per statistical unit.

Price per statistical unit

Price per Statistical Unit ($) = Total Price of a Bundle of SKUs Comprising a Statistical Unit ($)

Procter & Gamble and other companies face a challenge in monitoring prices for a wide variety of product sizes, package types, and product formulations. There are as many as 25 to 30 different SKUs for some brands, and each SKU has its own price. In these situations, how do marketers determine a brand's overall price level in order to compare it to competitive offerings or to track whether prices are rising or falling? One solution is the 'statistical unit,' also known as the 'statistical case' or – in volumetric or weight measures – the statistical liter or statistical ton. A statistical case of 288 ounces of liquid detergent, for example, might be defined as comprising:

Four 4-oz bottles = 16 oz
Twelve 12-oz bottles = 144 oz
Two 32-oz bottles = 64 oz
One 64-oz bottle = 64

Note that the contents of this statistical case were carefully chosen so that it contains the same number of ounces as a standard case of 24 12-ounce bottles. In this way, the statistical case is comparable in size to a standard case. The advantage of a statistical case is that its contents can approximate the mix of SKUs the company actually sells.

Whereas a statistical case of liquid detergent will be filled with whole bottles, in other instances a statistical unit might contain fractions of certain packaging sizes in order for its total contents to match a required volumetric or weight total.

Statistical units are composed of fixed proportions of different SKUs. These fixed proportions ensure that changes in the prices of the statistical unit reflect only changes in the prices of the SKUs that comprise it.

The price of a statistical unit can be expressed either as a total price for the bundle of SKUs comprising it, or in terms of that total price divided by the total volume of its contents. The former might be called the 'price per statistical unit'; the latter, the 'unit price per statistical unit.'

== See also ==
- List price
- Suggested retail price
- Bulk purchasing
- Lump sum
- Unit price information in supermarkets
