= N-ray =

Hypothetical form of radiation

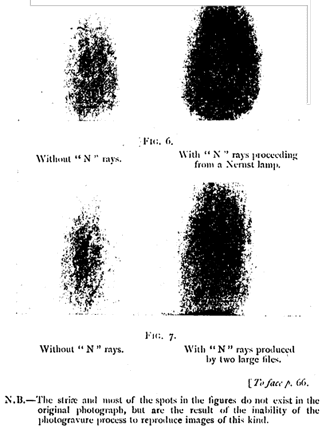
Fig. 6,7 from Prosper-René Blondlot: "Registration by Photography of the Action Produced by N Rays on a Small Electric Spark". Nancy, 1904.

N-rays (or N rays) were a hypothesized form of radiation described by French physicist Prosper-René Blondlot in 1903. They were initially confirmed by others, but subsequently found to be illusory.

== Background ==
The N-ray affair occurred shortly after a series of major breakthroughs in experimental physics. Victor Schumann discovered vacuum ultraviolet radiation in 1893, Wilhelm Röntgen discovered X-rays in 1895, Henri Becquerel discovered radioactivity in 1896, and, in 1897, J. J. Thomson discovered electrons, showing that they were the constituents of cathode rays. This created an expectation within the scientific community that other forms of radiation might be discovered.

At this time, Prosper-René Blondlot was a professor of physics at the University of Nancy studying electromagnetic radiation. Blondlot was a respected member of the scientific community: he was one of eight physicists who were corresponding members of the French Academy of Sciences and was awarded the Academy's Gaston Planté prize in 1893 and the LaCaze prize in 1899. His attempts to measure the speed of electromagnetic waves were commended by Thomson and Henri Poincaré. Blondlot began investigating the nature of X-rays shortly after their discovery, trying to determine whether they behaved as particles or electromagnetic waves. (This was before wave-particle duality became widely accepted among scientists.)

== Discovery ==
In 1903, Blondlot announced his discovery while working at the University of Nancy and attempting to polarize X-rays. He had perceived changes in the brightness of an electric spark in a spark gap placed in an X-ray beam which he photographed, and he later attributed to the novel form of radiation, naming this the N-rays for the University of Nancy. Blondlot, Augustin Charpentier, Arsène d'Arsonval, and approximately 120 other scientists in 300 published articles claimed to be able to detect N-rays emanating from most substances, including the human body, with the peculiar exceptions that they were not emitted by green wood and by some treated metals. Most researchers of the subject at the time used the perceived light of a dim phosphorescent surface as "detectors", although work in the period clearly showed the change in brightness to be a physiological phenomenon rather than some actual change in the level of illumination. Physicists Gustave le Bon and P. Audollet and spiritualist Carl Huter even claimed the discovery as their own, leading to a commission of the Académie des sciences to decide priority.

== Response ==
The "discovery" excited international interest and many physicists worked to replicate the effects. However, the notable physicists Lord Kelvin, William Crookes, Otto Lummer, and Heinrich Rubens failed to do so. Following his own failure, self-described as "wasting a whole morning", the American physicist Robert W. Wood, who had a reputation as a popular "debunker" of nonsense during the period, was prevailed upon by the British journal Nature to travel to Blondlot's laboratory in France to investigate further. Wood suggested that Rubens should go since he had been the most embarrassed when Kaiser Wilhelm II of Germany asked him to repeat the French experiments and, after two weeks, Rubens had to report his failure to do so. Rubens, however, felt it would look better if Wood went since Blondlot had been most polite in answering his many questions.

In the darkened room during Blondlot's demonstration, Wood surreptitiously removed an essential prism from the experimental apparatus, yet the experimenters still said that they observed N-rays. Wood also stealthily swapped a large file that was supposed to be giving off N-rays with an inert piece of wood, yet the N-rays were still "observed". His report on these investigations was published in Nature, suggesting that the N-rays were a purely subjective phenomenon, with the scientists involved having recorded data that matched their expectations. There is reason to believe that Blondlot in particular was misled by his laboratory assistant, who confirmed all observations. By 1905, no one outside of Nancy believed in N-rays, but Blondlot himself is reported to have still been convinced of their existence in 1926. Martin Gardner, making reference to Wood's biographer William Seabrook's account of the affair, attributed a subsequent decline in mental health and eventual death of Blondlot to the resulting scandal, but there is evidence that this is at least some exaggeration of the facts.

The term "N-ray" was added to dictionaries upon its announcement and was described as a real phenomenon until at least the 1940s. For instance, the 1946 Webster's Dictionary defined it as "An emanation or radiation from certain hot bodies which increases the luminosity without increasing the temperature: as yet, not fully determined."

== Significance ==
The incident is used as a cautionary tale among scientists on the dangers of error introduced by experimenter bias. N-rays were cited as an example of pathological science by Irving Langmuir. Nearly identical properties of an equally unknown radiation had been recorded about 50 years before in another country by Carl Reichenbach in his treatise Researches on Magnetism, Electricity, Heat, Light, Crystallization, and Chemical Attraction in their relations to the Vital Force in 1850, and before that in Vienna by Franz Mesmer in his Mémoire on the Discovery of Animal-Magnetism in 1779. It is clear that Reichenbach was aware of Mesmer's work and that researchers in Paris working with Blondlot were aware of Reichenbach's work, although there is no proof that Blondlot was personally aware of it.

A park in central Nancy is named after Blondlot. He left his house and garden to the city, which transformed it into a public park. James Randi reported that many citizens of Nancy and members of the faculty at the university did not remember having heard about N-rays or of Blondlot.

In the 2018 book The Skeptics' Guide to the Universe, the section titled "Iconic Cautionary Tales from History" recounts the story of the "discovery" of N-rays. A review of the book in Skeptical Inquirer reported that the book uses the N-rays incident to reveal the danger of "scientists insufficiently applying skepticism", because "Three hundred scientific papers were published by one hundred experimenters over three years, all declaring this imaginary phenomenon to be real."

== See also ==
- List of experimental errors and frauds in physics
- List of topics characterized as pseudoscience
- Pathological science
- Retraction
- Scientific misconduct
