= Prosper-René Blondlot =

French physicist (1849–1930)

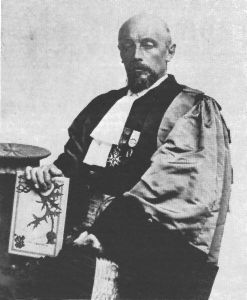
- Circa 1910 photograph of Prosper-René Blondlot
- Born: 3 July 1849; Nancy, France
- Died: 24 November 1930 (aged 81); Nancy
- Education: University of Lorraine
- Known for: Determining the velocity of radio waves, N rays
- Awards: Prix Leconte of the French Academy of Sciences
- Scientific career
- Fields: Physics
- Institutions: University of Nancy

Prosper-René Blondlot (French: [pʁɔspɛʁ ʁəne blɔ̃dlo]; 3 July 1849 – 24 November 1930) was a French physicist, who in 1891 made the first measurement of the speed of radio waves, but is more remembered for his "discovery" of N rays, a phenomenon that subsequently proved to be illusory.

== Early life and work ==
Blondlot was born in Nancy, France, and spent most of his early years there, teaching physics at the University of Nancy, being awarded three prestigious prizes of the Académie des Sciences for his experimental work on the consequences of Maxwell's theory of electromagnetism.

In order to demonstrate that a Kerr cell responds to an applied electric field in a few tens of microseconds, Blondlot, in collaboration with Ernest-Adolphe Bichat, adapted the rotating-mirror method that Léon Foucault had applied to measure the speed of light. He further developed the rotating mirror to measure the speed of electricity in a conductor, photographing the sparks emitted from two conductors, one 1.8 km longer than the other and measuring the relative displacement of their images. He thus established that the speed of electricity in a conductor is very close to that of light.

In 1891, he made the first measurement of the speed of radio waves, by measuring the wavelength using Lecher lines. He used 13 different frequencies between 10 and 30 MHz and obtained an average value of 297,600 km/s, which is within 1% of the modern value for the speed of light. This was an important confirmation of James Clerk Maxwell's theory that light was an electromagnetic wave like radio waves.

== N rays ==
In 1903, Blondlot announced that he had discovered N rays, a new species of radiation. The "discovery" attracted much attention over the following year and many physicists worked, unsuccessfully, to replicate the effects.

The French Academy of Sciences awarded the Prix Leconte (₣50,000) for 1904 to Blondlot, citing the totality of his work rather than the discovery of N-rays.

American physicist Robert W. Wood, who had a reputation as a popular "debunker" of nonsense during the period, proved that the phenomena were purely subjective with no physical origin. By 1905 no one outside of Nancy believed in N rays, but Blondlot himself is reported to have still been convinced of their existence in 1926.

The incident has since been used as a cautionary tale among scientists on the dangers of error introduced by experimenter bias.

== Later years ==
Little is known about Blondlot's later years. William Seabrook stated in his Wood biography Doctor Wood, that Blondlot went insane and died, supposedly as a result of the exposure of the N ray debacle: "This tragic exposure eventually led to Blondlot's madness and death." Using an almost identical wording, this statement was repeated later by Martin Gardner: "Wood's exposure led to Blondlot's madness and death." However, Blondlot continued to work as a university professor in Nancy until his early retirement in 1910. He died at the age of 81; at the time of the N-ray affair, he was about 54–55 years old.
