= Louis de Crevant, Duke of Humières =

French nobleman

Marshal of France Louis de Crevant duc d’Humières
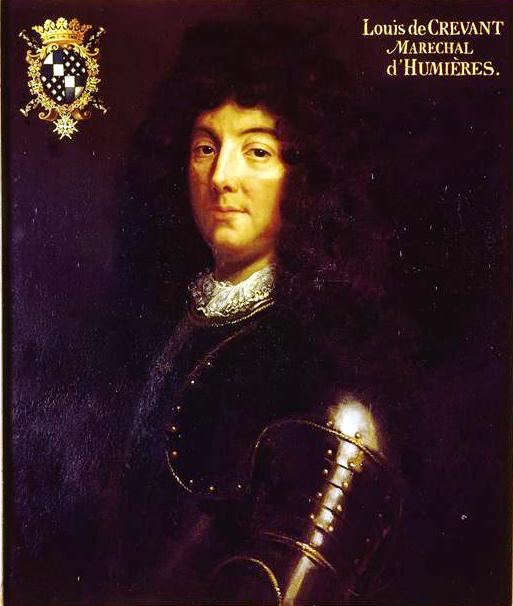
- Louis de Crevant, Duke of Humières
- Born: c. 1628; Château d'Azay-le-Ferron, Touraine
- Died: 30 August 1694 (age c. 66); Versailles
- Burial place: Church of Saint Martin, Monchy-Humières
- Military career
- Allegiance: France
- Service years: 1648–1690
- Rank: Marshal of France 1668
- Commands: Grand Master of Artillery 1685-1694; Commander, Army of Flanders 1683-1684 and 1688-1689
- Conflicts: Franco-Spanish War 1635-1659; Battle of the Dunes 1658; War of Devolution 1667-1668; Franco-Dutch War 1672-1678; Cassel 1677; War of the Reunions 1683-1684; Nine Years War 1688-1697; Walcourt 1689; Namur 1692
- Awards: Order of the Holy Spirit 1688
- Other work: Governor of French Flanders (1667-1674); Hainaut and Bourbonnais; Lille and Compiègne

Louis de Crévant, duc d'Humières (c. 1628 – 30 August 1694) was a French nobleman of the 17th century, who became a Marshal of France in 1668 and Grand Master of Artillery in 1685.

His career allegedly benefited from connections to his maternal relatives, the Phélypeaux family, many of whom held senior positions in the government of Louis XIV and Louvois, Minister of War from 1662 to 1691. Appointed commander of French forces in Flanders at the start of the 1688-1697 Nine Years War, he was relieved of command following defeat at Walcourt in 1689. He was made a duke in April 1690 and died in 1694.

== Life ==
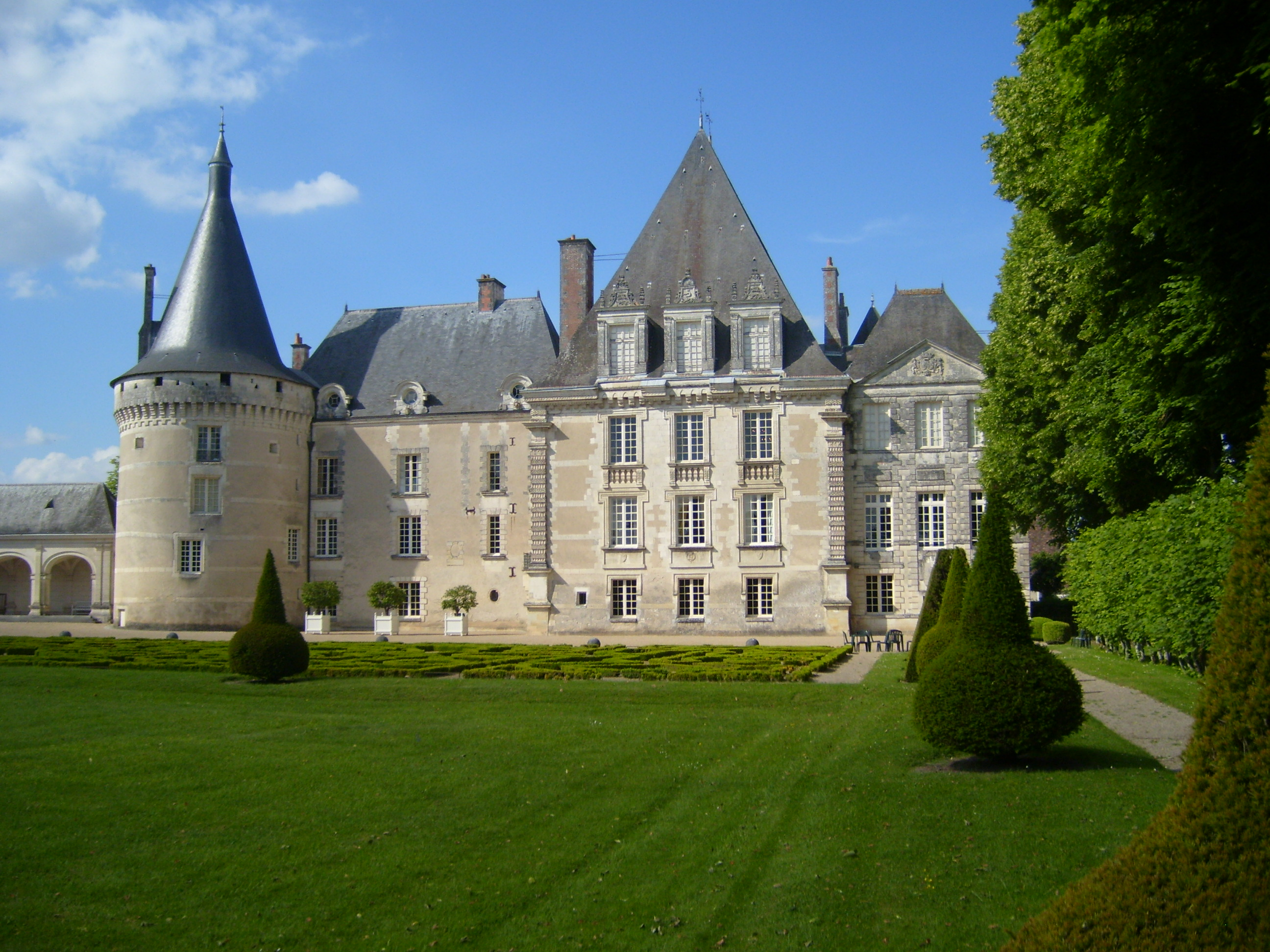
Château d'Azay-le-Ferron, the family home

The de Crévants came from Azay-le-Ferron, in the French department of Indre; his grandfather acquired the title and lands of Humières, Artois in 1595, when he married Jacqueline d'Humières, last of her family. Louis de Crévant (1628-1694) was one of nine children of Louis III de Crevant (ca 1606-1648) and Isabelle Phélypeaux (1611-1642).

To prevent the division of family estates amongst multiple heirs, it was then common practice for younger sons to remain unmarried. Of his siblings who reached adulthood, two brothers became senior officers in the French Navy; Jacob, who died at Messina in 1675, and Raymond (ca 1629-1688). Of the others, Roger (died 1687) and Balathasar (died 1684) were members of the Knights of Malta religious order, while his sisters Marie and Isabeau became nuns.

In March 1653, he married Louise Antoinette de la Châtre (1639-1723), later Lady-in-waiting to Queen Maria Theresa. They had four daughters and two sons, Henri-Louis, killed at the Siege of Luxembourg 1684 and Louis-François-Roger (?-1679). Marie-Thérèse (ca 1652-1687), Marie-Louise (1658-1710), Anne-Louise (ca 1666-1717) and Anne-Louise-Julie (1665-1748).

== Career ==
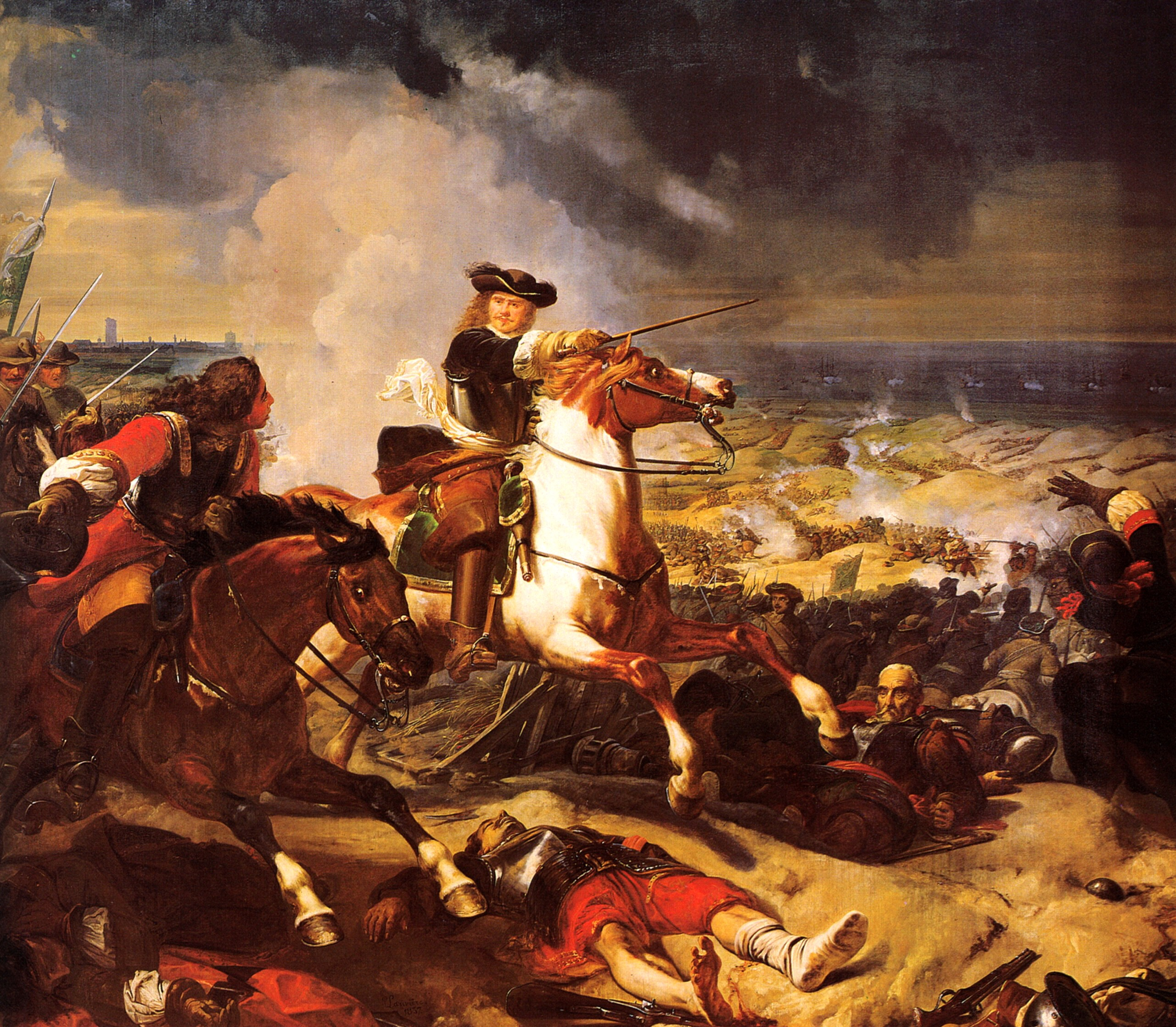
The Battle of the Dunes by Charles-Philippe Larivière, 1837. The Battle of the Dunes took place in June 1658; Humières fought in this decisive French victory, under Turenne, shown here

In the first half of the 17th century, France was divided internally and threatened externally; while it largely stayed out of the 1618-1648 Thirty Years' War, support for the Dutch Republic in its war of independence from Spain eventually led to the 1635-1659 Franco-Spanish War. At home, the French Wars of Religion that had ended with the 1590 Edict of Nantes flared up again in a series of domestic Huguenot rebellions in the 1620s.

The accession of the five-year-old Louis XIV in 1643 caused a power struggle between his regents, headed by his mother, Anne of Austria and Cardinal Mazarin, opposed by regional magnates like Condé. This resulted in the 1648-1653 civil war known as the Fronde, during which Humières supported the Royalists; he took part in the latter stages of the Franco-Spanish War and by 1658 was a Lieutenant-General. He fought under Turenne at the Battle of the Dunes, a decisive victory that led to the 1659 Treaty of the Pyrenees.

In the 1667-1668 War of Devolution, France over-ran Franche-Comté and much of the Spanish Netherlands; Humières participated in the 1667 Siege of Lille and in 1668, he was made a Marshal of France. However, the Dutch preferred a weak Spain as a neighbour in the Spanish Netherlands, rather than a strong and ambitious France; with England and Sweden, they formed the Triple Alliance, obliging Louis to return most of his gains in the 1668 Treaty of Aix-la-Chapelle. Angered by what he viewed as ingratitude for previous French support against Spain, Louis made preparations to invade the Netherlands.

In April 1672, Turenne was appointed general en chef or senior commander of French forces in the Netherlands; this caused problems, as the convention was Marshalls did not serve under other Marshalls. Humières, de Créquy and Bellefonds refused to serve under Turenne, arguing that to do so would diminish their personal prestige and the position of Marshal; all three were banished to their estates.

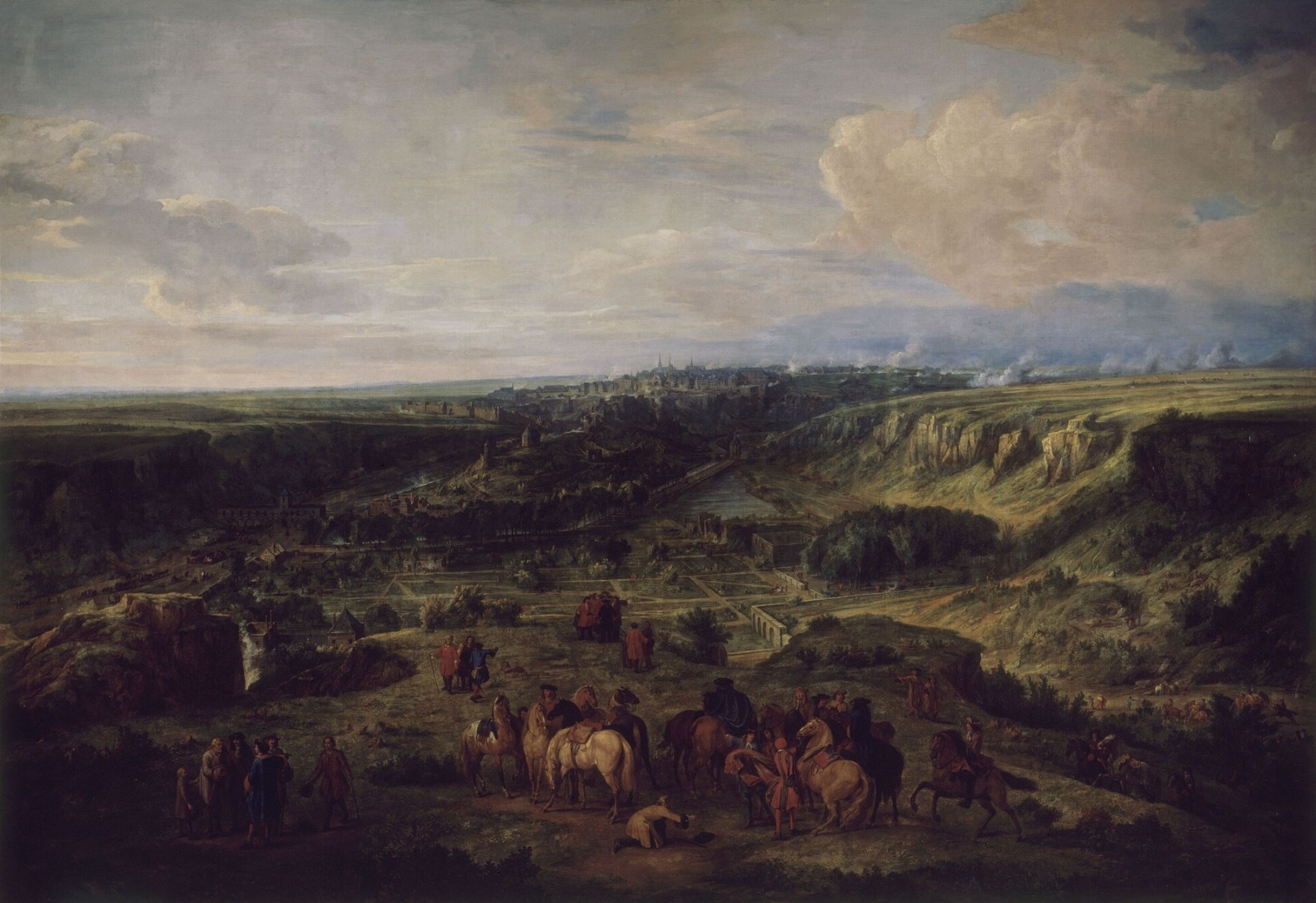
Humières' son and heir Henri-Louis died at the Siege of Luxembourg in June 1684;

The Franco-Dutch War began in May 1672, when the French over-ran much of the Dutch Republic and initially seemed to have achieved an overwhelming victory. By late July, the Dutch position had stabilised and they gained the support of Brandenburg-Prussia, Emperor Leopold and Charles II of Spain. With new fronts opening in Spain and the Rhineland, French troops withdrew from the Dutch Republic by the end of 1673, retaining only Grave and Maastricht.

By 1673, Humières and his two colleagues had made their apologies and been taken back into service; he spent most of the war in the Spanish Netherlands, primarily occupied in siege warfare. In the 1683-1684 War of the Reunions, he commanded the French army of Flanders, capturing the Spanish-held towns of Kortrijk or Coutrai and Diksmuide in November 1683. Henri-Louis, his son and heir, was killed during the Siege of Luxembourg, which surrendered in June 1684; in return for confirming possession of Luxembourg and Strasbourg, annexed in 1681, France returned its other conquests in the Truce of Ratisbon.

Humières coat of arms; quartered, silver-azure, Crevant, silver-'fretté de sablé,' Humières

The truce of Ratisbon was supposed to last 20 years but ended in 1688 when Louis began the Nine Years War by invading the Dutch Republic. Appointed Grand Master of Artillery in 1685, Humières was once again given command of the Army of Flanders but was defeated by forces of the Grand Alliance at Walcourt in August 1689. He was replaced by the duc de Luxembourg and while present at the Namur in 1692, this ended his military career. He was made Duc d'Humières in April 1690; in May, his daughter Anne-Louise-Julie (1665-1748) married Louis François d'Aumont, the marriage contract specifying he would inherit the title.

== Legacy ==
Louis spent his last years at the Chateau de Monchy-Humières, which he extensively remodelled, with large ornamental gardens. These have disappeared, although the chateau remains. He was buried in the local church of Saint Martin; many of the tombs were destroyed during the French Revolution and in 1936, a sale of contents from the chateau included a full-length marble sculpture, previously used as a garden ornament. Originally thought to be from Louis' tomb, it was in fact Jean III d'Humières (died 1553), by the sculptor Jean Bontemps and is now in the Louvre.

== Sources ==
- De Périni, Hardÿ (1896). Batailles françaises, Volume IV. Ernest Flammarion, Paris.;
- de Sainte-Marie, Anselme; de Sainte-Rosalie, Ange (1730). Histoire de la Maison Royale de France, et des grands officiers de la Couronne. Paris: La Compagnie des libraires associez.;
- Hume, Martin Andrew Sharp (2002). Spain: Its Greatness and Decay (1479-1788). Adamant Media Corporation. ISBN 978-0543784124.;
- Lynn, John (1996). The Wars of Louis XIV, 1667-1714 (Modern Wars In Perspective). Longman. ISBN 978-0582056299.;
- Penin, Marie Christine. "Humières, Louis de Crévant, Marquis, later duc". Tombes-sepultures.;
- Popoff, Michel, Pinoteau, Hervé (1996). Armorial de l'ordre du Saint-Esprit. Le Léopard d'or. ISBN 2-86377-140-X.; (in French)
- Swann, Julian (2017). Exile, Imprisonment, or Death: The Politics of Disgrace in Bourbon France, 1610-1789. OUP. ISBN 978-0198788690.;

French nobility
Preceded by Louis III de Crevant	Marquis d'Humières; 1648–1690	Succeeded by elevated to duke
Preceded by first creation	Duke of Humières; 1690–1694	Succeeded by Louis François d'Aumont
Military offices
Preceded by Henry de Daillon	Grand Master of Artillery; 1685–1694	Succeeded by Louis Auguste, duc de Maine
Preceded by Louis III de Crevant, Marquis d'Humières	Governor of Compiègne; 1646–1694	Succeeded by Louis François d'Aumont, 2nd duc d'Humières
