= Emesene =

Emesene may refer to:

- an inhabitant of ancient Emesa (modern-day Homs), Syria
- Emesene dynasty
- Emesene helmet
- Emesene kingdom
- Emesene necropolis
