= Tomb of Sampsigeramus =

1st century AD mausoleum (destroyed) in Emesa, Syria

- ضريح شمسيغرام (Arabic)
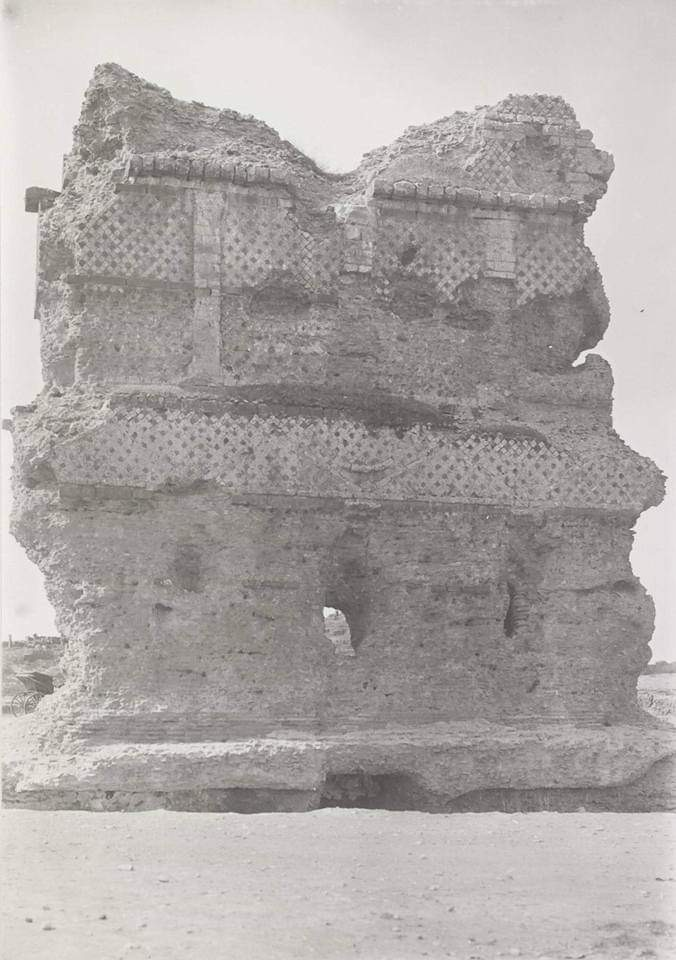
- The Tomb of Sampsigeramus, photographed 1907, before its remains were blown up c. 1911
- Interactive map of Tomb of Sampsigeramus
- 34°43′38.986″N 36°42′13.784″E
- Type: Mausoleum
- Location: Necropolis of Emesa (modern-day Homs), Syria

History
- Built: 78 or 79 CE
- Built by: Gaius Julius Sampsigeramus

Site notes
- Condition: Ruined

The Tomb of Sampsigeramus (Arabic: ضريح شمسيغرام, romanized: Ḍarīḥ Shamsīghirām) was a mausoleum that formerly stood in the necropolis of Emesa (modern-day Homs, Syria). It is thought to have been built in 78 or 79 CE by a relative of the Emesene dynasty. The remains of the mausoleum were blown up with dynamite by the Ottoman authorities c. 1911, in order to make room for an oil depot.

According to Andreas Kropp, the monument may be considered to have been a "hybrid creation" and a "fascinating one-off experiment" that resulted from "the cultural choices which the ruling class of Emesa had to face when attempting to reconcile Roman allegiance and Near Eastern tradition."

== Location ==
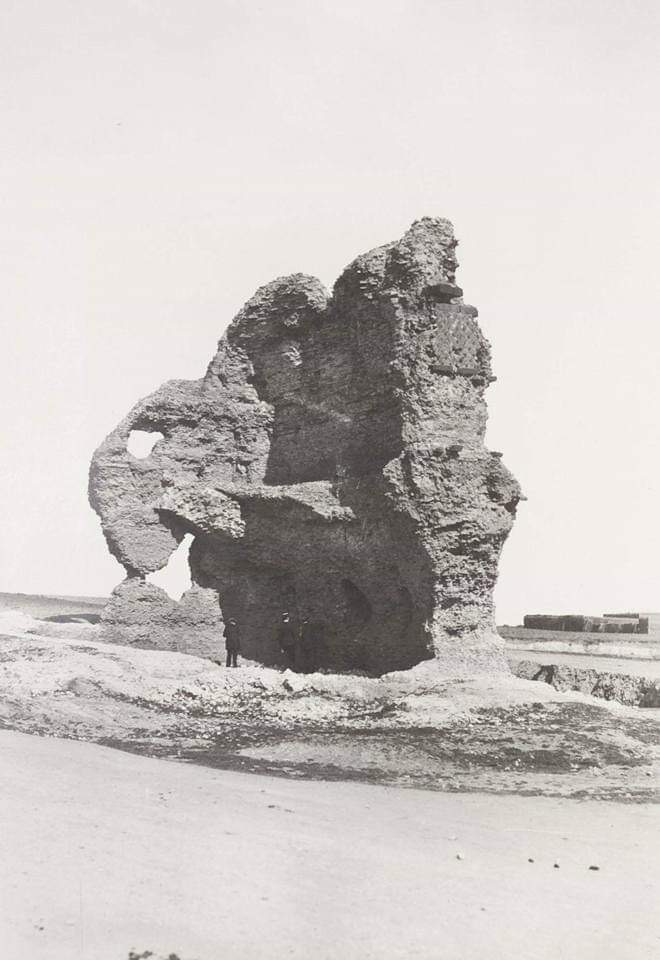
Inner view, 1907

In the 18th century, Richard Pococke described the monument as standing "about a furlong to the west" of what is now the Old City of Homs. The mausoleum was near the train station that exists now. The greater part of the necropolis of Emesa was made to disappear by 1952 in order to build the municipal stadium known today as Khalid ibn al-Walid Stadium, after excavations begun in August 1936 had uncovered a total of 22 tombs.

== Owner ==
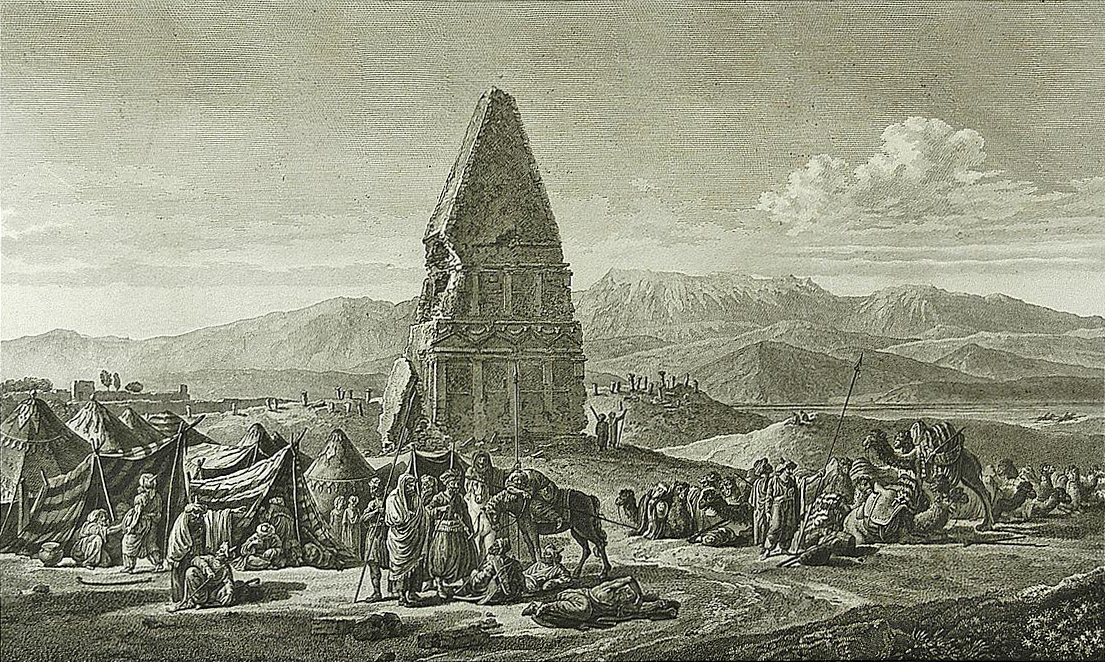
Cœnotaphe de Caius Cæsar drawn by Louis-François Cassas (Voyage pittoresque de la Syrie, plate 21), published 1799

In the 16th century, Pierre Belon described a monument that was inscribed with the Greek letters of an epitaph of "Caius Cæſar" – which may have made it a cenotaph of Gaius Julius Caesar Vipsanianus. It is however believed that Belon misread the inscription from this monument. Pietro Della Valle found in the inscription a ΓΑΙΩ ΙΟΥΛΙΩ, but not "Caesar"; later Pococke, who made the first summary drawing of the mausoleum, found that "on the eaſtern side the firſt word is ΓΑΙΟϹ". Louis-François Cassas' reproduction of an inscription bearing the name "CAIUS CÆSAR" on plate 23 of Voyage pittoresque de la Syrie, published 1799, is considered to have been a fantasy of the artist. In the 19th century, William Henry Waddington copied a Greek inscription said to have belonged to the monument and a copy of the latter by Dr. Skender Effendi (hereafter reproduced with the characters Ε, Ξ and Ω):

ΓΑΙΟϹΙΟΥΛΙΟϹ
ΦΑΒΙΑϹΑΜϹΙΓΕ
ΡΑΜΟϹΟΚΑΙϹΕΙΛ
ΑϹΓΑΙΟΥΙΟΥΛΙΟΥ
ΑΛΕΞΙΩΝΟϹΥΙΟϹ
ΖΩΝΕΠΟΙΗϹΕΝ
ΑΥΤΩΚΑΙΤΟΙϹΙΛ
ΟΙϹΕΤΟΥϹϞΤ

Γάϊος Ἰούλιος, Φαβίᾳ, Σαμσιγέραμος ὁ καὶ Σεί[λ]ας, Γαΐου Ἰουλίου Ἀλεξίωνος υἱός, ζῶν ἐποίησεν [ἑ]αυτῷ καὶ τοῖς ἰ[δί]οις, ἔτους ϟτʹ

Carlos Chad has given the following translation of the inscription reconstituted by Waddington: "Caius Julius Sampsigéram, de la tribu Fabia, dit Seilas, fils de Caius Julius Alexion, a construit de son vivant ce tombeau, pour lui-même et les siens, l'an 390 [of the Seleucids]", id est in 78 or 79 CE.

The builder of the mausoleum may have been related to the Emesene dynasty through Gaius Julius Alexion. According to Maurice Sartre, the owner's Roman citizenship, attested by his tria nomina, strongly supports relatedness to the royal family. The lack of allusion to royal kinship is best explained if the dynasty had been deprived of its kingdom shortly before the mausoleum was built and the said kingdom had been annexed to the Roman province of Syria, which occurred very likely between 72 and the construction of the mausoleum. As worded by Kropp, "what the builder was really keen on stressing is that he was a Roman citizen bearing the tria nomina."

== Architecture ==
Drawings by Cassas, published 1799

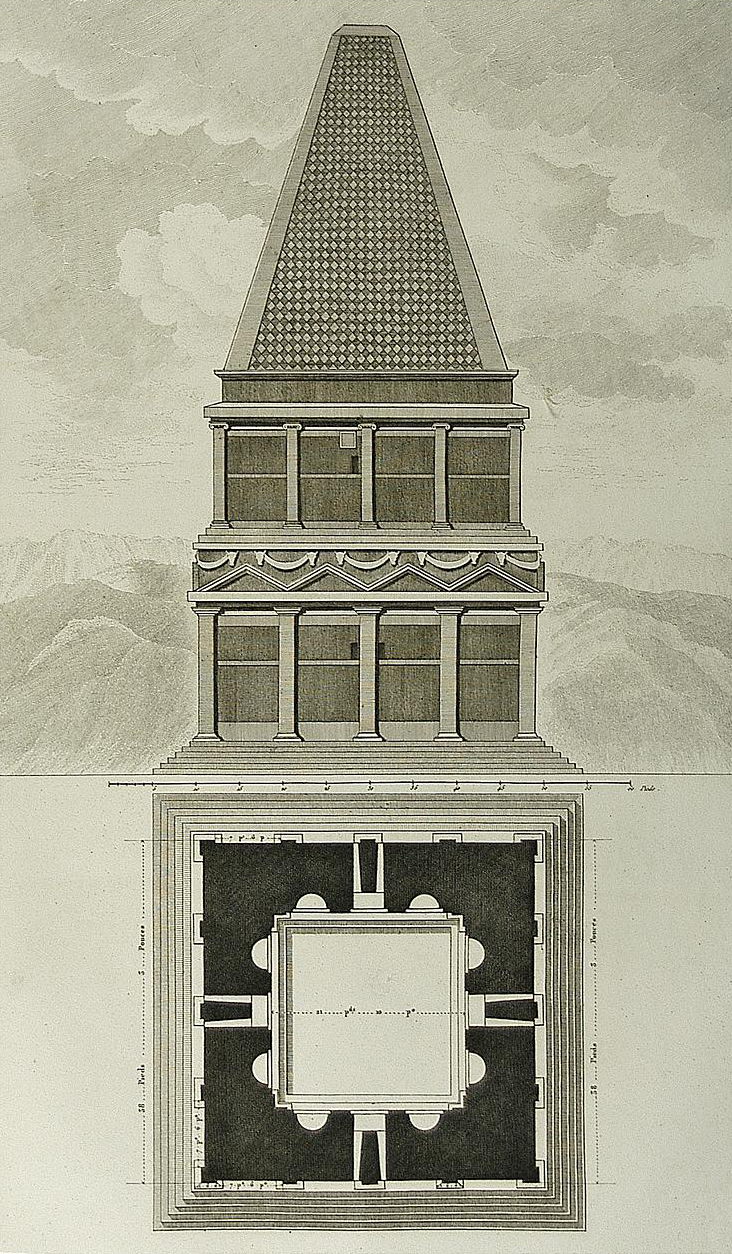
Plan and elevation of the "Cœnotaphe" (plate 22)

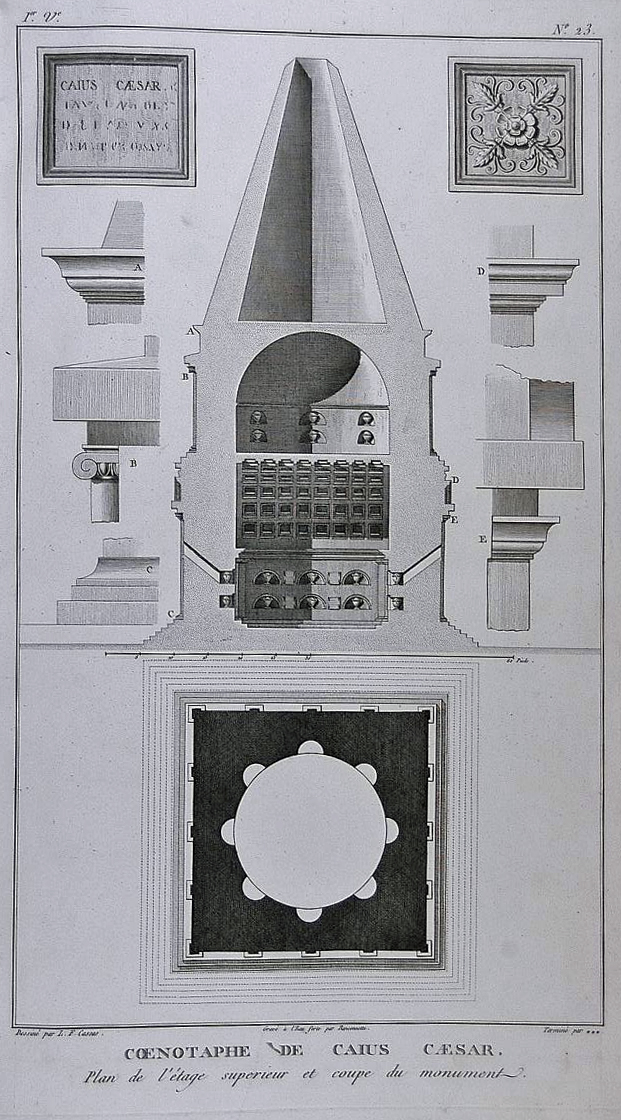
Plan of the first floor and cross-section of the "Cœnotaphe" [with the inscription] (plate 23)

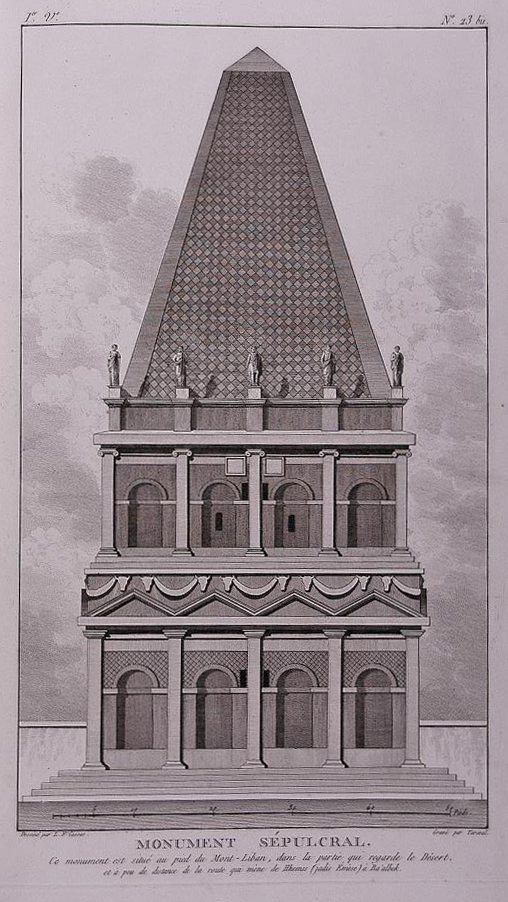
"Monument sépulcral" (plate 23 bis); apparently a different reconstruction proposal from plate 22 for the publication

Upon completion, the monument was about 25 meters high and, as worded by Kropp, "retained the basic formal characteristics of a traditional nefesh, i.e. a pyramidal stele, albeit on an immense scale", comparable with those of Kamouh el Hermel (in Lebanon) and the Tomb of Hamrath at Suwayda (also destroyed).

The outer walls and the roof were conceived in opus reticulatum, which is considered a rarity in the Orient, following a purely Roman construction technique using concrete which certainly necessitated the intervention of workers of Italian origin or having undergone a specific training. It was also unusual that opus reticulatum not be covered by stucco; according to Kropp, Sampsigeramus may have ordered to leave it visible as a statement that he was "on good terms with the rulers of the world, that is the Roman people and in particular with the Roman emperor".

== Gallery ==
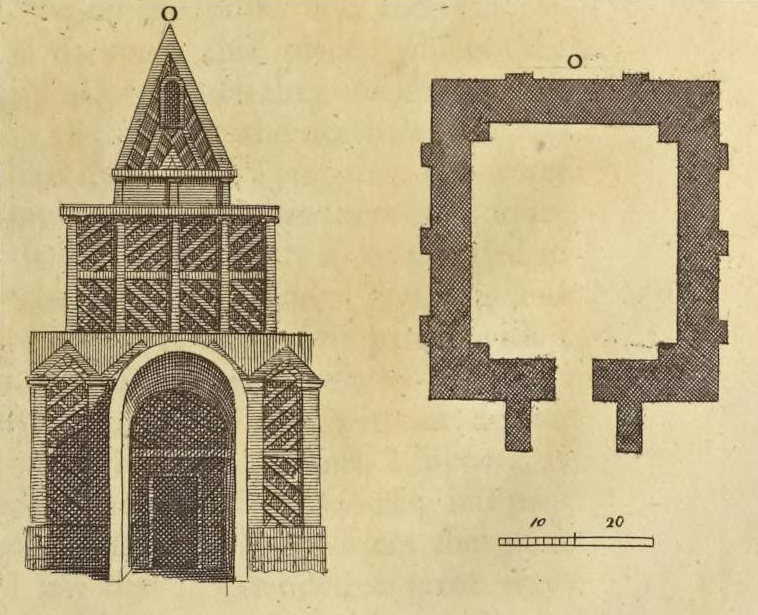
Pococke's "plan and view" of the monument (A Description of the East, volume 2, plate 22, O & O), published 1745

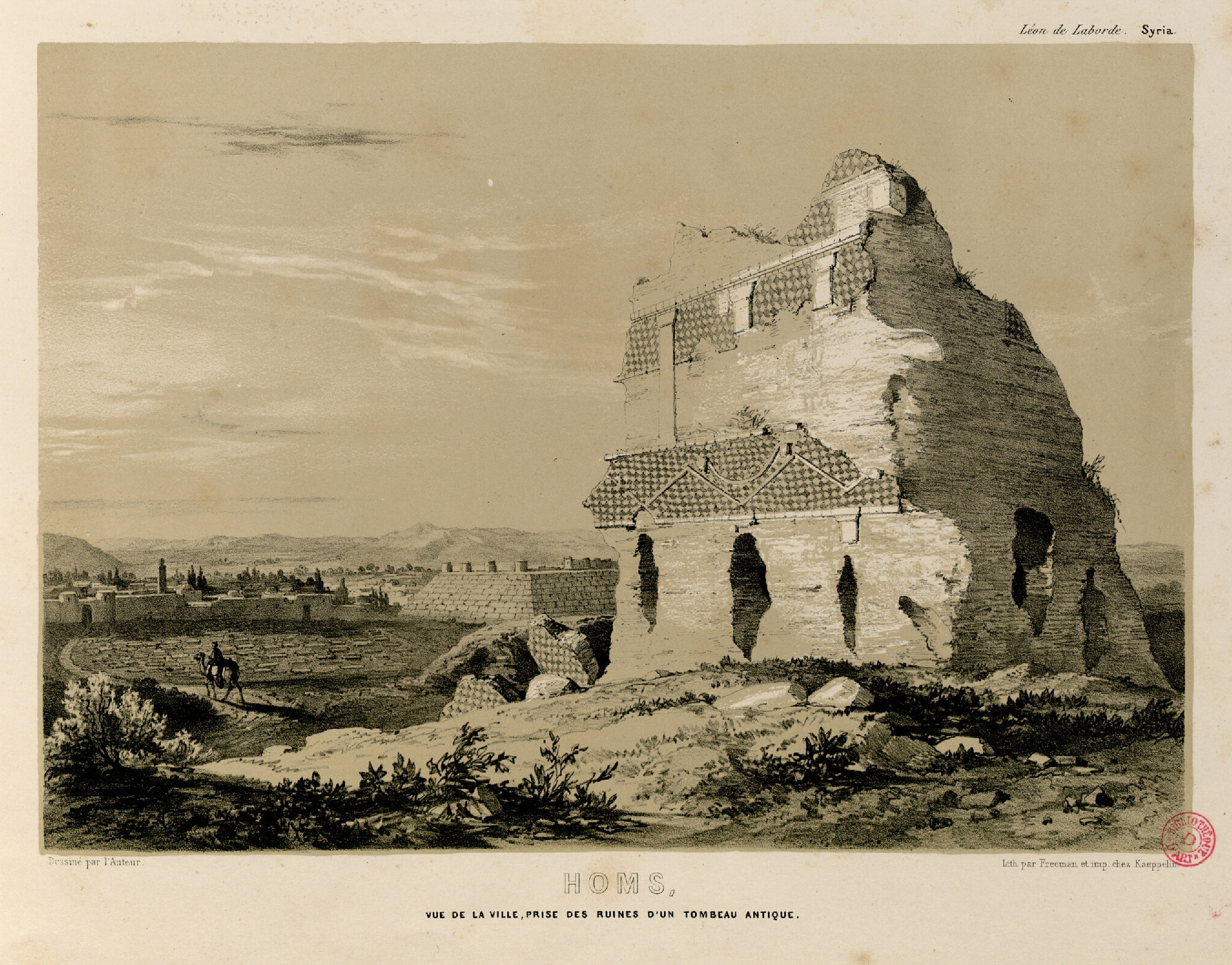
Drawing by Léon de Laborde lithographed and published 1837

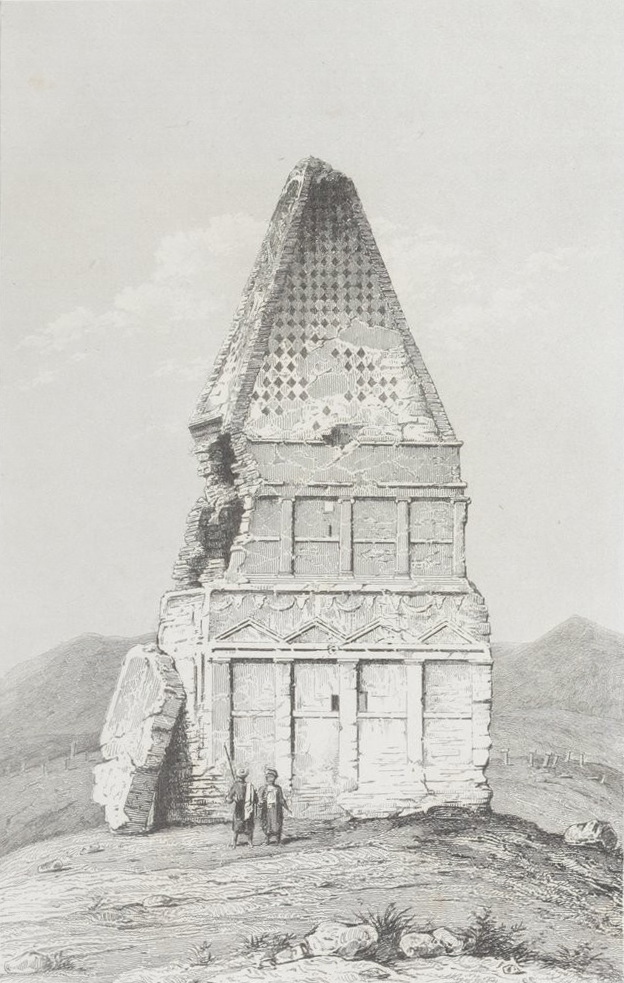
Engraving published 1865 (direxit Lemaitre)

== See also ==
- Emesa helmet – which was found in the same necropolis
- Tower of Qalaat Faqra – Roman-period tower in Mount Lebanon

== Sources ==
- Belon, Pierre (1588). Les observations de plusieurs singularitez et choses mémorables (in French). Paris.
- Chad, Carlos (1972). Les Dynastes d'Émèse (in French).
- Kropp, Andreas (2010). "Earrings, Nefesh and Opus Reticulatum: Self-Representation of the Royal House of Emesa in the First Century AD". In Kaizer, Ted; Facella, Margherita (eds.). Kingdoms and Principalities in the Roman Near East. Franz Steiner Verlag Stuttgart.
- Kropp, Andreas J. M. (2013). Images and Monuments of Near Eastern Dynasts, 100 BC—AD 100. Oxford University Press. ISBN 9780199670727.
- Jullien, M. (1893). Sinaï et Syrie (in French). Lille.
- Millar, Fergus (1993). The Roman Near East. Harvard University Press. ISBN 9780674778863.
- Nordiguian, Lévon, ed. (2004). Le voyage archéologique en Syrie et au Liban de Michel Jullien et Paul Soulerin en 1888 (in French). Presses de l'Université Saint-Joseph. ISBN 9789953455525.
- Pococke, Richard (1745). A Description of the East. Vol. 2. London.
- Sartre, Maurice (2001). D'Alexandre à Zénobie : Histoire du Levant antique (in French). Fayard. ISBN 9782213640693.
- Schmidt-Colinet, Andreas (1996). "Antike Denkmäler in Syrien. Die Stichvorlagen von Louis François Cassas (1756–1827) im Wallraf-Richartz-Museum in Köln". Kölner Jahrbuch (in German). 29. ISBN 9783786119760.
- Seyrig, Henri (1952a). "Antiquités Syriennes 53: Antiquités de la Nécropole d'Émèse (1^{re} partie)". Syria. XXIX (3–4): 204–250. doi:10.3406/syria.1952.4788. JSTOR 4390311. (in French)
- Seyrig, Henri (1952b). "Le casque d'Emèse". Les Annales Archéologiques de Syrie. 2.
- Waddington, W. H. (1870). Inscriptions grecques et latines de la Syrie (in French). Paris.
