= Pierre Bontemps =

French sculptor

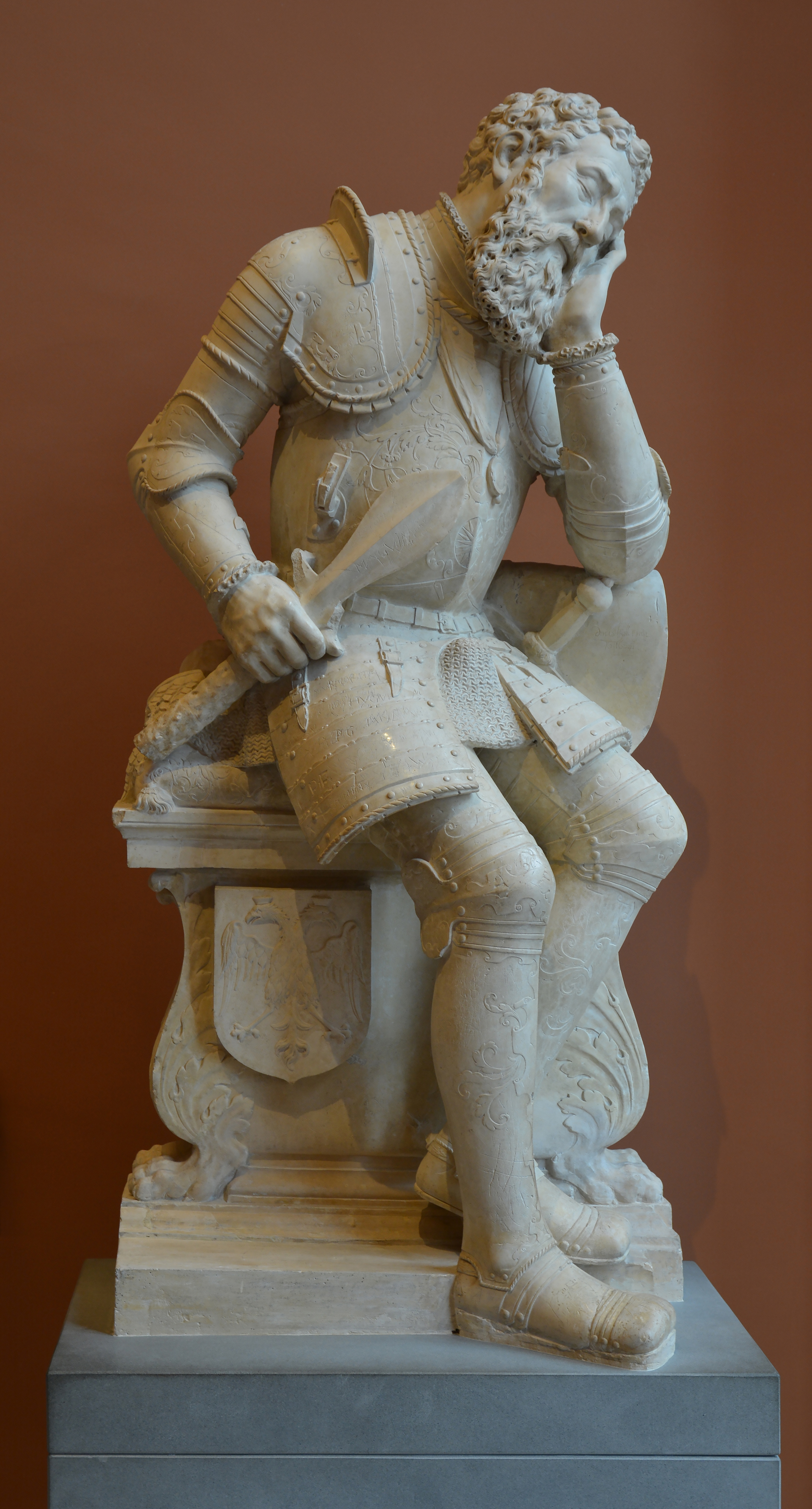
Figure from the tomb of Charles de Maigny (Musée du Louvre)

Pierre Bontemps (c. 1505–1568) was a French sculptor known for his funeral monuments; he was, with Germain Pilon, one of the pre-eminent sculptors of the French Renaissance.

He executed most of the bas-reliefs on the tomb of King Francis I of France, representing the French victories at the battle of Marignano and the battle of Ceresole.

His also are the statues of the king, Queen Claude, the Dauphin, and Louis XII and Anne of Brittany on Louis' tomb in the Basilica of Saint-Denis. The figures from the tomb of Charles de Maigny (c. 1556) now reside in the Musée du Louvre.

In 1936, a sale of contents from the chateau of Monchy-Humières included a full-length marble tomb which had been used as a garden ornament. Originally thought to be of Louis, duc d'Humières (1628–1694), it was in fact Jean III d'Humières (died 1553), executed by Bontemps. This is also in the Louvre.
