= Louis-François Cassas =

French painter, sculptor, architect, archeologist and antiquary (1756-1827)

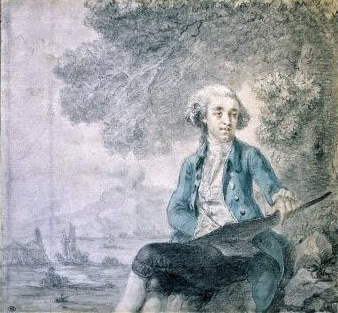
- Portrait by Dominique Vivant Denon, 1786
- Born: June 3, 1756; Azay-le-Ferron
- Died: November 1, 1827 (aged 71); Versailles
- Occupations: Painter and etcher

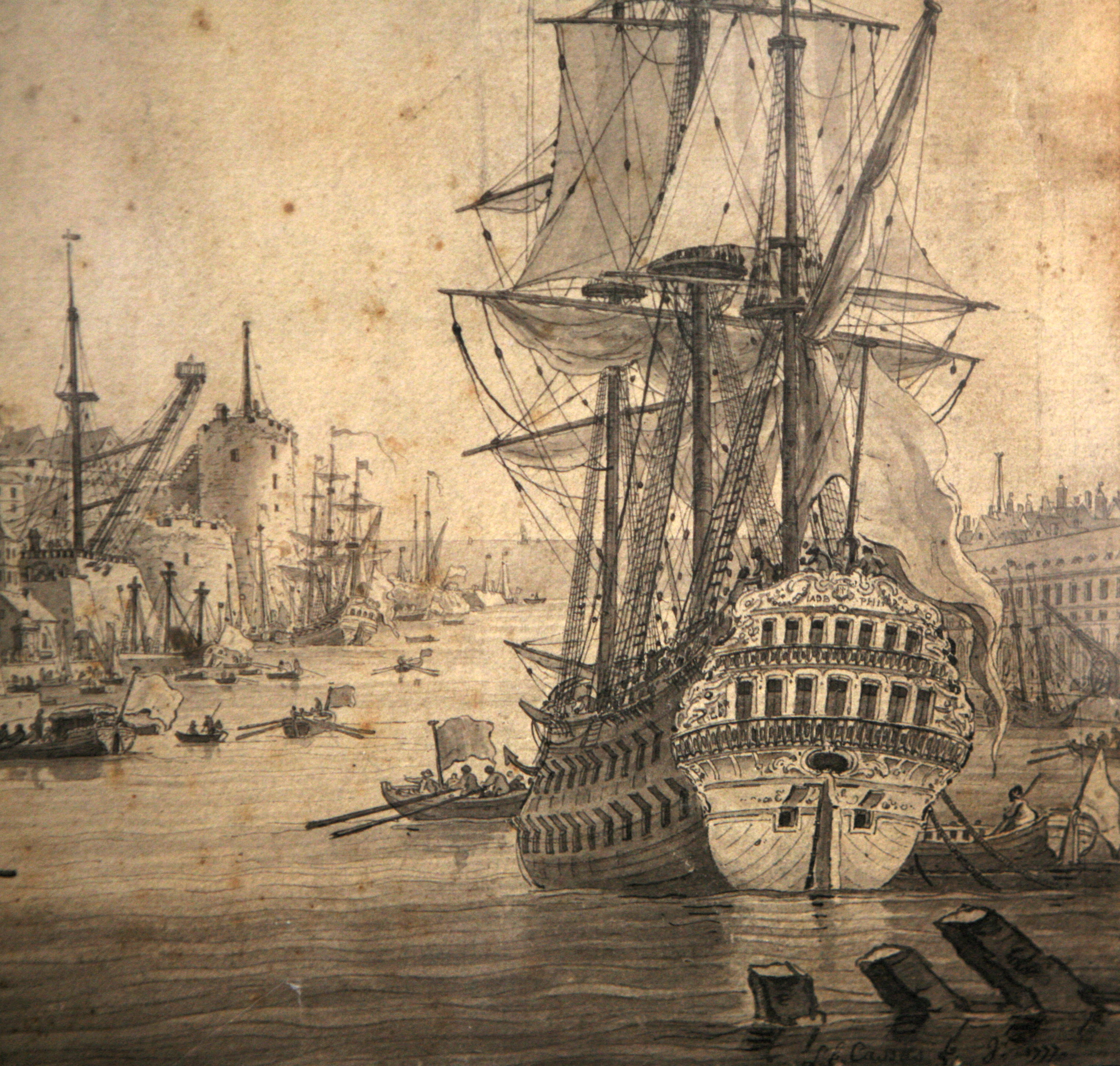
Detail of Brest, Penfeld harbour in 1777, by Louis-François Cassas.

Louis-François Cassas (June 3, 1756 – November 1, 1827) was a French landscape painter, sculptor, architect, archaeologist and antiquary born at Azay-le-Ferron, in the Indre Department of France. His father was an artisan in the office of the "Ponts et Chaussés", and Cassas followed him there as an apprentice draughtsman when he was only fifteen years old.

== Life ==
As the godson of the Marquis Louis-François de Gallifet, owner of the Château d'Azay-le-Ferron, where Cassas was born, his artistic education was very eclectic. He studied in Tours and Paris before traveling to Rome. His teachers included Joseph-Marie Vien (1716–1809), a Neo-classical painter and teacher to Jacques-Louis David (1748–1825), Louis Jean François Lagrenée the younger (1739–1821), as well as Roccoco painters such as Jean-Baptiste Le Prince (1734–1781). In 1778 Cassas went to Rome, Venice, Naples and Sicily where he spent the first years of his youth in the study of ancient monuments. A commission by "une societe d'amateurs des beaux arts" in 1782 took him from Istria to southern Dalmatia, to make a series of illustrations of the antiquities on the east Adriatic coast. These drawings were later published as engravings and reproduced to 69 copperplate printings in his 2-volume book Voyage pittoresque et historique de l'Istrie et de la Damatie, published in Paris in 1802. The original watercolors are at the Victoria and Albert Museum in London.

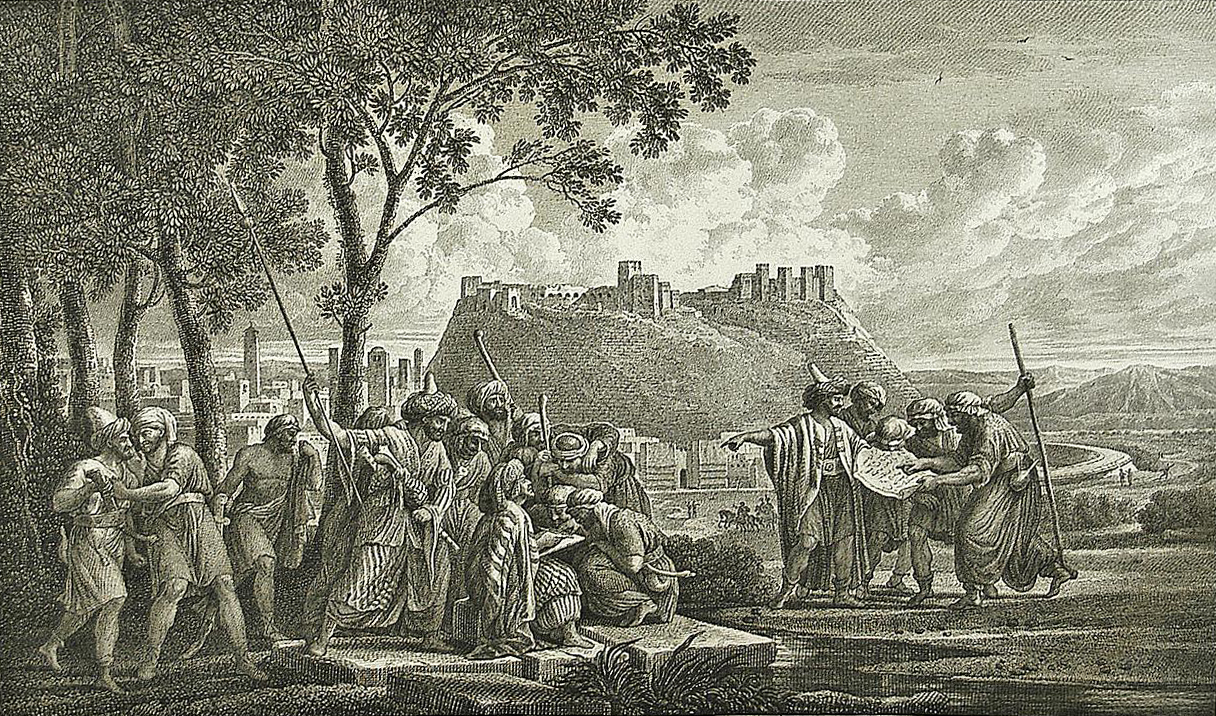
Château et portion de la ville de Hemss, jJadisÉmèse, where Cassas represented himself drawing (Voyage pittoresque de la Syrie, 1799, plate 20)

From 1784 to 1786, Cassas lived and worked at the French embassy. In 1784 he accompanied the Count Choiseul-Gouffier, the French Ambassador to the Ottoman Empire, on his mission to Constantinople. Commissioned by him, he travelled from 1784 to 1787 engaged in making drawings for the Ambassador's second volume of Voyage pittoresque de la Grèce, published in 1809. He visited Egypt from October to December 1785, and drew the antiquities of Alexandria, the pyramids of Giza and the mosques of Cairo. Shortly afterwards he made several drawings of Palmyra, in the desert of Syria, visited the Holy Land and illustrated the ruins of Baalbec in Lebanon. He also painted Palestine, Cyprus and Asia Minor, drawing ancient Middle Eastern sites, many of which had never been recorded.

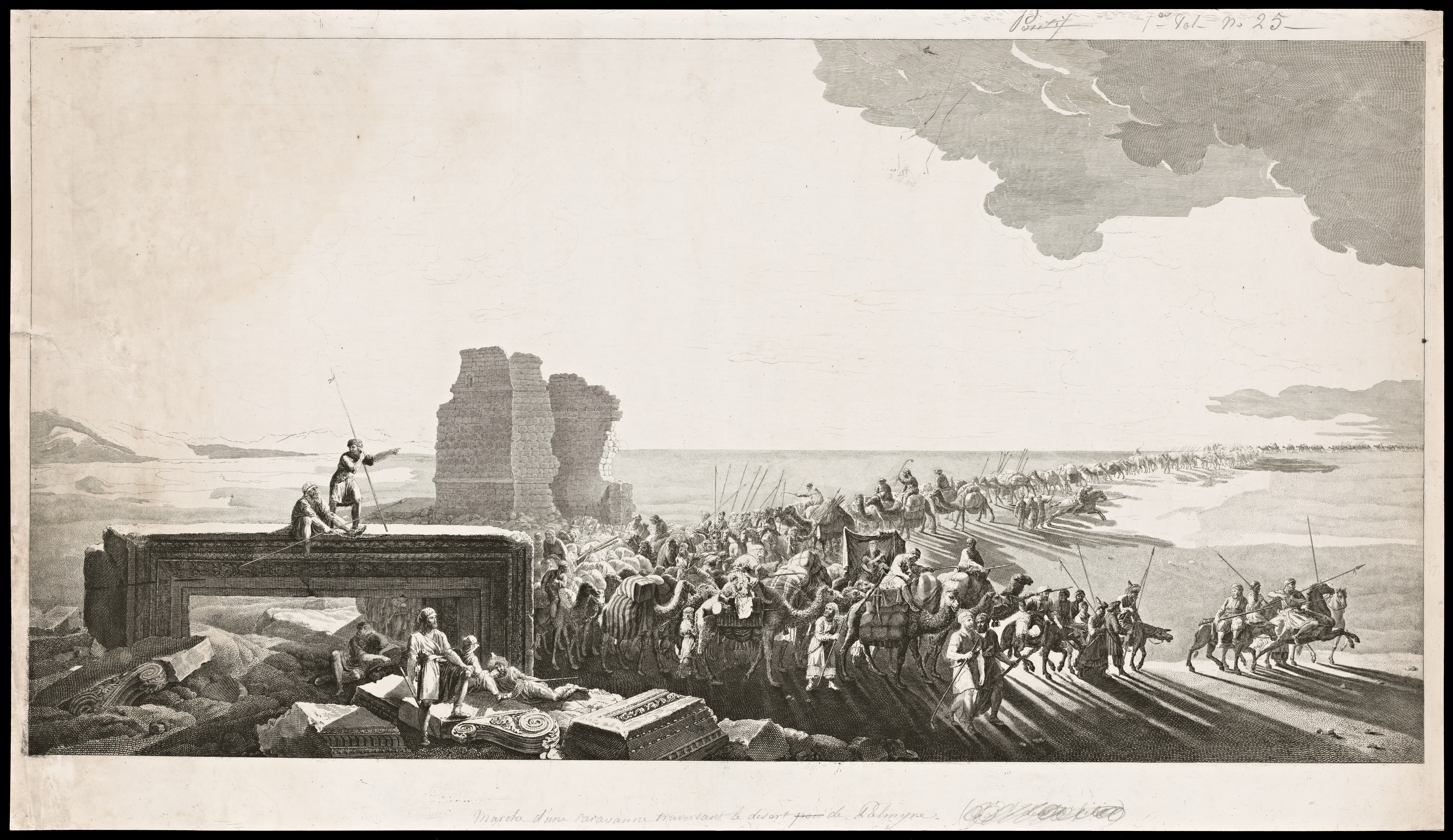
Etching after Louis-François Cassas showing an imagined caravan arriving at the ancient site of Palmyra, Syria. Created ca. 1799.

At the beginning of the French Revolution, the artist returned to France via Rome, arriving in Paris in 1792. The result of his labours then appeared in the Voyage Pittoresque de la Syrie, de la Phenicie, de la Palestine, et de la Basse Egypte, which he began publishing in 1799. The originals of his works in oil paintings for both voyages were deposited in the Bibliothèque Royale. Many of the preliminary drawings for the published etchings in Voyage are held in the collections of the Wallraf-Richartz Museum, Cologne, and a publication archive—which includes proof-plates and a manuscript detailing Cassas’ journey—is held by the Getty Research Institute, Los Angeles.

At the turn of the eighteenth to nineteenth century, the artist had already combined his first observations of Egyptian monuments in a series of paintings which were very influential on many artists and stage designers in the early decades of the nineteenth century. He was appointed as drawing professor and later as General Inspector at the Gobelin Tapestry Manufactory, for contributing to the development of products from this factory.

He died in Versailles of a stroke of apoplexy, on November 1, 1827, invested with several orders of knighthood, including the Légion d'honneur, granted to him by the king on May 21, 1821. After his death Cassas was largely forgotten and his work was greatly neglected. In 1973, the government of Yugoslavia paid homage to Cassas issuing a postage stamp of the city of Split from one of his 1782 etchings called Vue de Spalatro et du Lazareth.

== Works ==
As an architect, he was occupied many years in forming a large collection of 745 architectural models of ancient monuments in cork and terracotta in almost every kind of style, from many countries and epochs. They were exhibited in 1806, along with engravings of the original sites and present-day ruins behind them. Eventually, he came to disposed of them for a small annuity to the imperial government for the general use of the public. They were deposited in the Palais de l'Institut and later transferred to Paris's École des Beaux-Arts.

Besides his architectural and archaeological drawings and sketches, he drew numerous costumes studies, views and processions, as well as scenes from daily life, plants and animals of all sorts. He also exhibited views of his travels at the "Salons", which were periodic art exhibitions sponsored by the French Académie Royale, in 1804 and 1814, and published Picturesque views of the Principal Sites and Monuments of Greece, of Sicily, and of the Seven Hills of Rome, of which thirty parts had already been published by 1813.

== See also ==
- Watercolor painting
- Etching

== Notes ==
- Collection of Modern and Contemporary Voyages & Travels, vol. I, printed for Richard Phillips, 6, Bridge-street, Blackfriars, by Bernard & Sulter, Water Lane, Fleet Street, London, 1805.

== Bibliography ==
- Elisabeth A. Fraser, "In the Shadow of les Grands: Cassas's Orientalist Self-Fashioning," in Mediterranean Encounters: Artists Between Europe and the Ottoman Empire, 1774-1839, Penn State University Press, 2017. ISBN 978-0-271-07320-0
