= Château d'Azay-le-Ferron =

Castle and manor in Azay-le-Ferron, France

Coordinates: 46°51′4″N 1°4′12″E

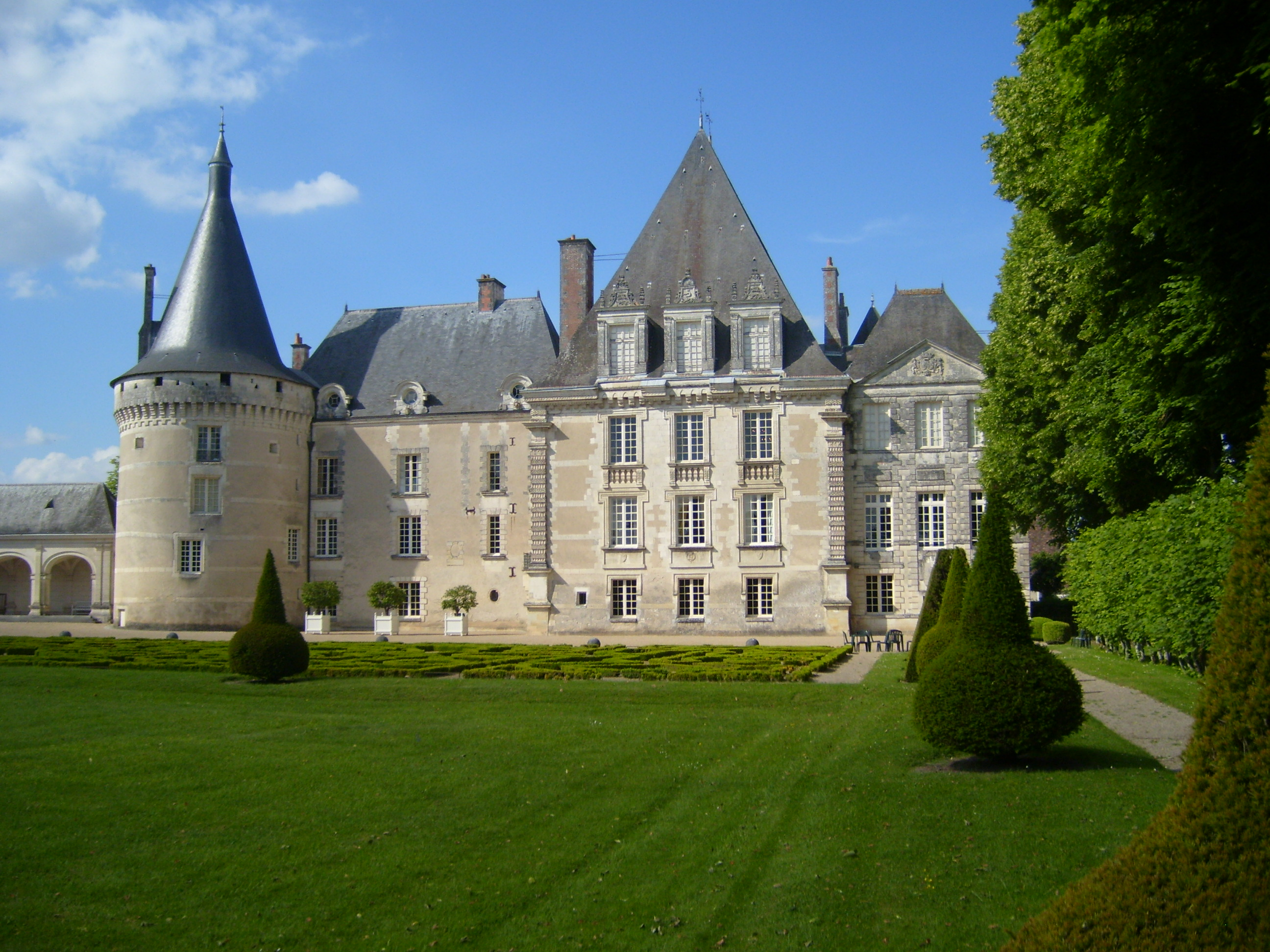
Château d'Azay-le-Ferron, showing the 15th-century tower (left), the 17th-century residence (center) and the 18th-century residence (right)

Château d'Azay-le-Ferron is a 15th-century castle and 17th-century manor located in the commune of Azay-le-Ferron in the Indre département of France. It features a garden à la française and a French landscape garden dating to the 17th century, redone in the 19th and 20th century. The interior is richly furnished. The château is owned by the city of Tours and is open to the public.

The castle is classified as a Monument historique since 1950.

== History ==
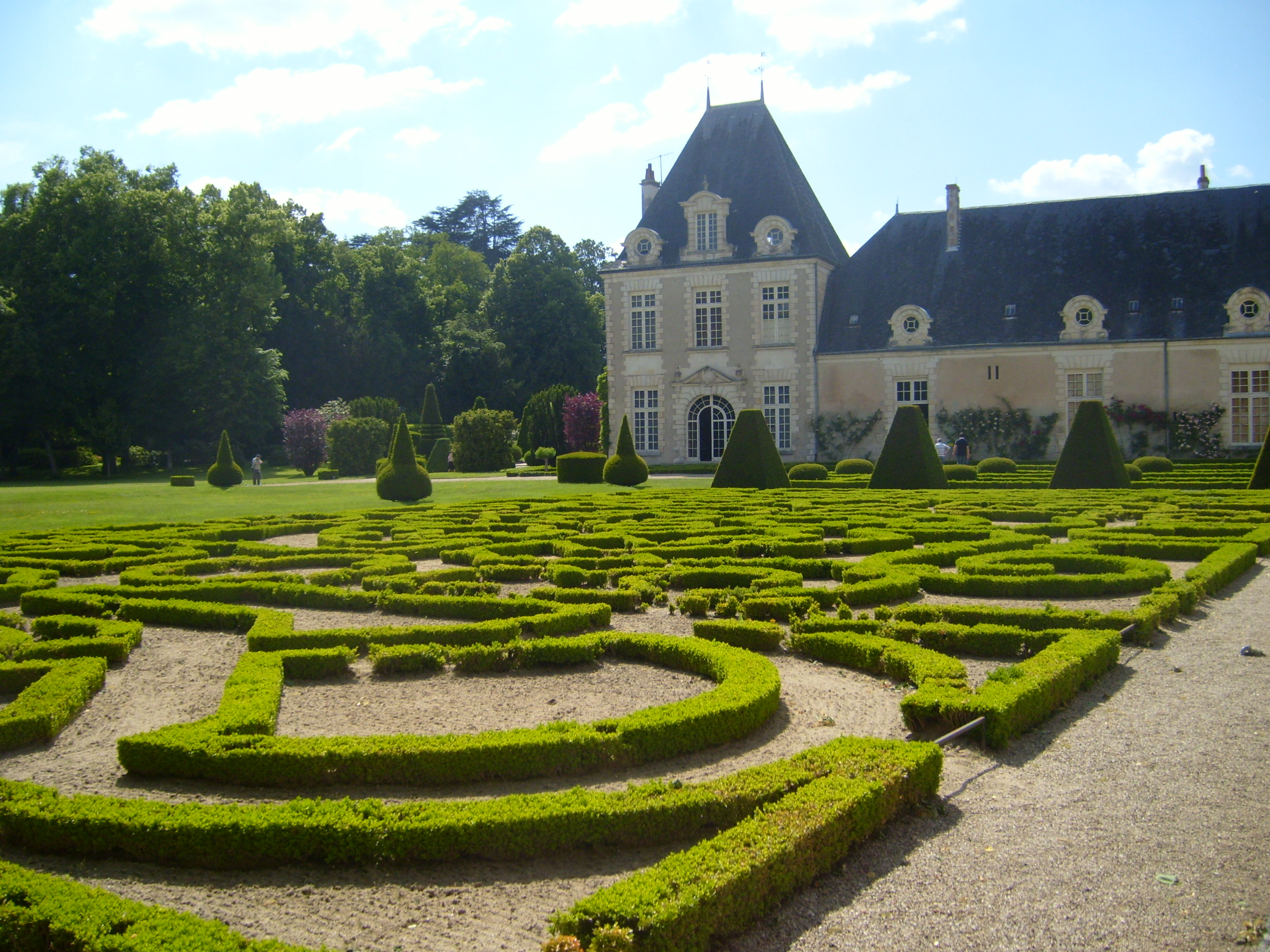
Parterre of the garden à la française

The first château was constructed by Prégent Frotier in the late 15th century, on land which had belonged to Nicolas Turpin de Crissé in the 13th century, then became part of the barronie of Preuilly in 1412. The tower of the first château, dated 1496, still stands, incorporated into later structures of the 17th century.

In 1560, the chateau passed to the family of Louis I de Cravant, who owned it until the end of the 17th century. The owners included Cesar de Vendôme, son of King Henry IV of France and Gabrielle d'Estrées, who became Baron of Preuilly by royal decree, and Louis IV de Crevant, a Maréchal in the army of Louis XIV. A residence and a new wing and pavilion were added to the tower in 1638, probably by Louis III de Crevant d'Humieres, and windows were pierced in the old tower to transform the fortress into a residence. This new wing was ornamented with the salamander emblem of King François I, and the ermine emblem of Claude de France.

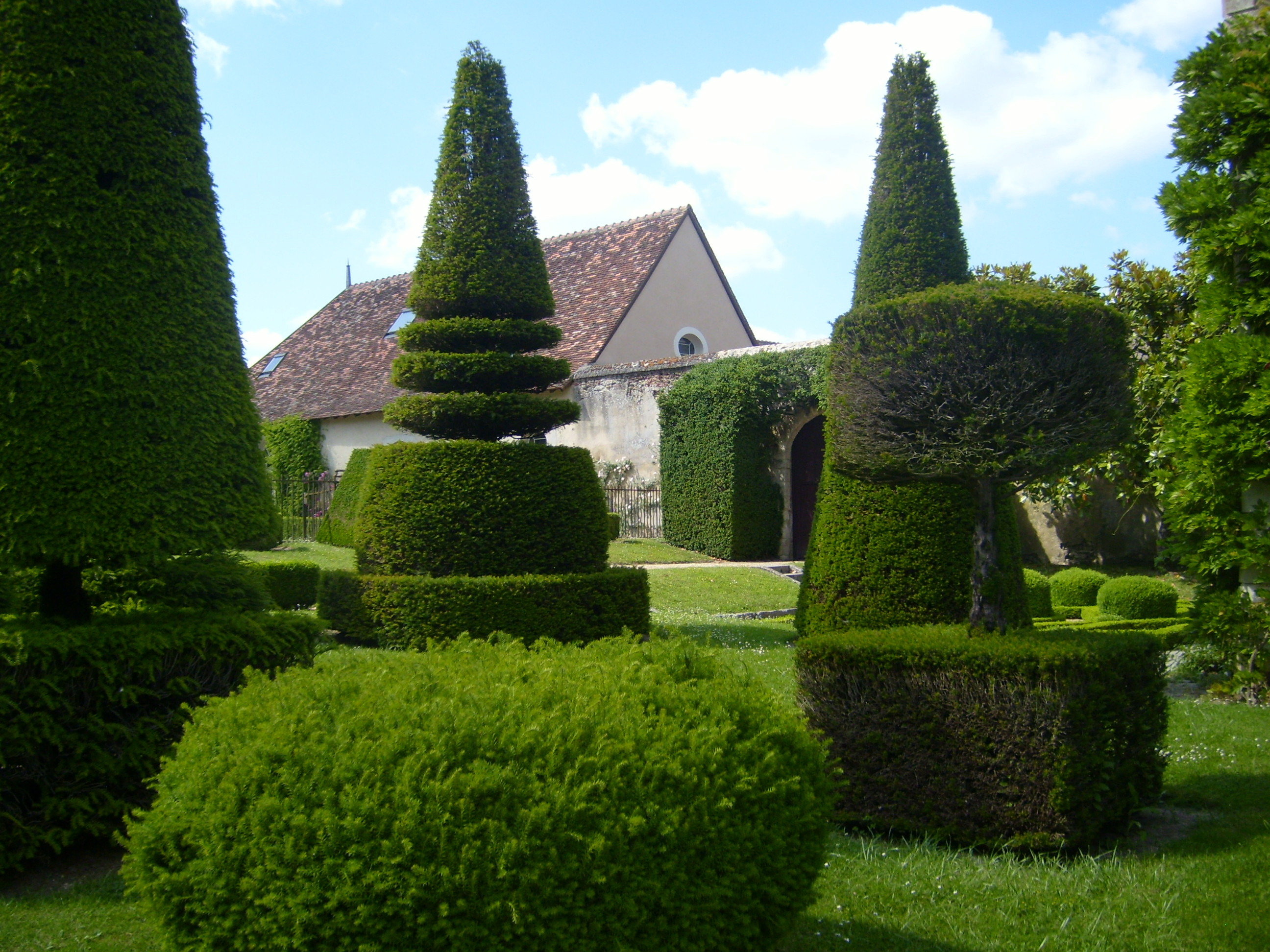
Topiary garden at Château d'Azay-le-Ferron, with trees shaped to resemble chess pieces

In 1699, the baronnie Château d'Azay-le-Ferron was purchased by Louis-Nicolas Le Tonnelier de Breteuil. His daughter, Gabrielle-Emilie, was the mistress of Voltaire from 1733 until 1737. The de Breteuil family owned the chateau until 1739, when it was sold to Louis François de Gallifet. The de Breteuil family probably constructed the east wing of the building, which carries their coat of arms.

After 1739, the estate passed to a long series of owners. Shortly after the Revolution, it was owned by two prominent manufacturers of weapons for the army of Napoleon. In 1852, it was purchased by Victor and Antoine Luzarche. They and their descendants owned the house through the rest of the 19th and early 20th century.

The granddaughter of Antoine Luzarche, Marthe, married George Hersent, a civil engineer and owner of a large firm which built canals and ports, and inherited the château in 1925. When she died, she left the house and park to the city of Tours.

== The Interior ==
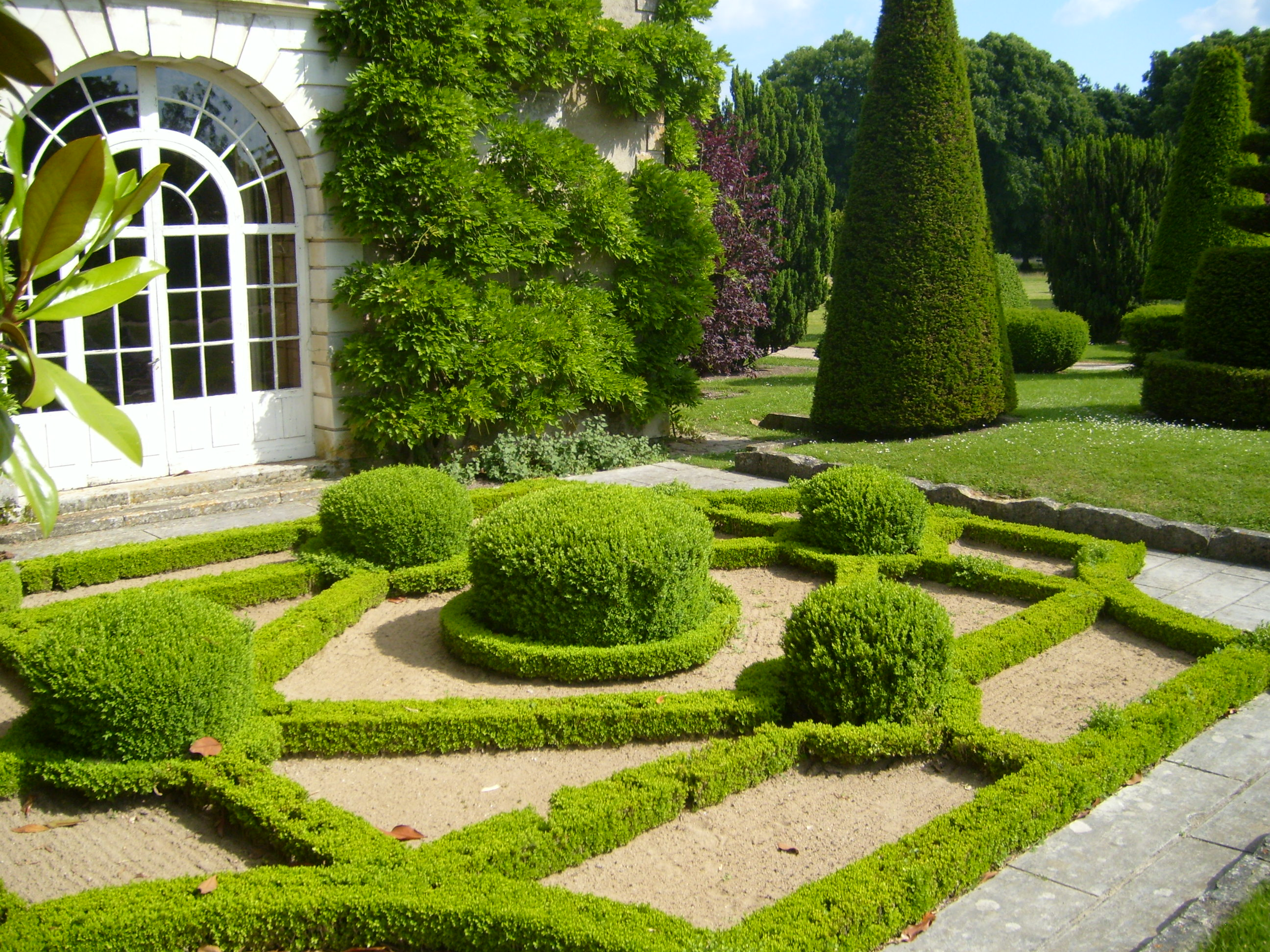
Part of the French garden at Château d'Azay-le-Ferron

The château is furnished as it was when occupied by the Luzarche family and George Hersant and his wife, between 1850 and 1953, when it opened to the public.

On the ground floor, the small dining room has a buffet from the 18th century, and a collection of 18th-century still-life paintings. The Salle des Gardes contains a large collection of hunting trophies from Roger Luzarche d'Azay, including an enormous stuffed crocodile from his hunting trips to Africa in the late 19th century.

The grand stairway to the first floor has an inscription on the wall noting that it was built by Jacques de Crevant, Baron of Preuilly, in 1638. The Salon Empire on the first floor has a notable collection of furniture and art from the period of the First French Empire collected by Gregoire Michel, a Paris banker and the owner of the house from 1803 to 1852. The bedroom of Madame Hersent has a notable Empire bed and furniture, and botanical painting by Jean-François Garneray (1775–1837). The Salon Resturation has a magnificent parquet floor in the form of a rose, taken from the private mansion in Versailles. The room was the bedroom of George Hersent.

The Salle Cassas features a gallery of drawings made by Louis-François Cassas (1756–1827), who was born in the chateau, the godson of the Marquis de Gallifet, the owner at the time. From 1784 onwards, Cassas was in the company of the Count of Choiseul-Gouffier, the French Ambassador to the Ottoman Empire. He traveled throughout the Ottoman Empire and made drawings of the monuments of Turkey, Egypt and Syria. In 1816, he became the inspector of the royal manufactory of tapestries of Gobelins, which represents the signing of the Treaty of Westphalia which ended the Thirty Years' War.

The library features a large 16th-century tapestry, "L'Enlevement des Sabines," from either Flanders or Paris, and the painting "L'Allegorie de la Paix, from 1641, by the Dutch artist Hendrick Martensz Sorgh (1611–1670).

The bedroom of Madame Luzarche d'Azay is furnished in the Louis XVI style, with the original pink striped wallpaper from the period.

The largest and most impressive room of the house, the Grand Salon, is located on the second floor. Its main features are an early 17th-century painted ceiling, brought from the same house in Versailles as the parquet floor of the Salon Restauration; and richly decorated chests and cabinets from the Italian Renaissance period. It displays three paintings by the Genoese artist Antonio Lagorio (1652–1690), and a painting of the Virgin and the Child by Simon François de Tours (1606–1671), believed to be an allegory about the birth of a child to Anne of Austria, the Regent of Louis XIV.

The large dining room, also on the second floor, has fine wood panelling from the 1930s, a marble fountain from Languedoc, a large Baccarat crystal chandelier, and Aubusson tapestries representing Louis XV hunting.

The Salle Voltaire, furnished in the 18th century, recalls the romantic relationship between Voltaire and the daughter of Nicholas-Louis Le Tonnelier de Bretieul, owner of the chateau.

The Salon de la Tour, on the lower level of the tower, the oldest part of the chateau, displays French Regency period commodes and portraits of the early owners of the chateau.

== Park and gardens ==
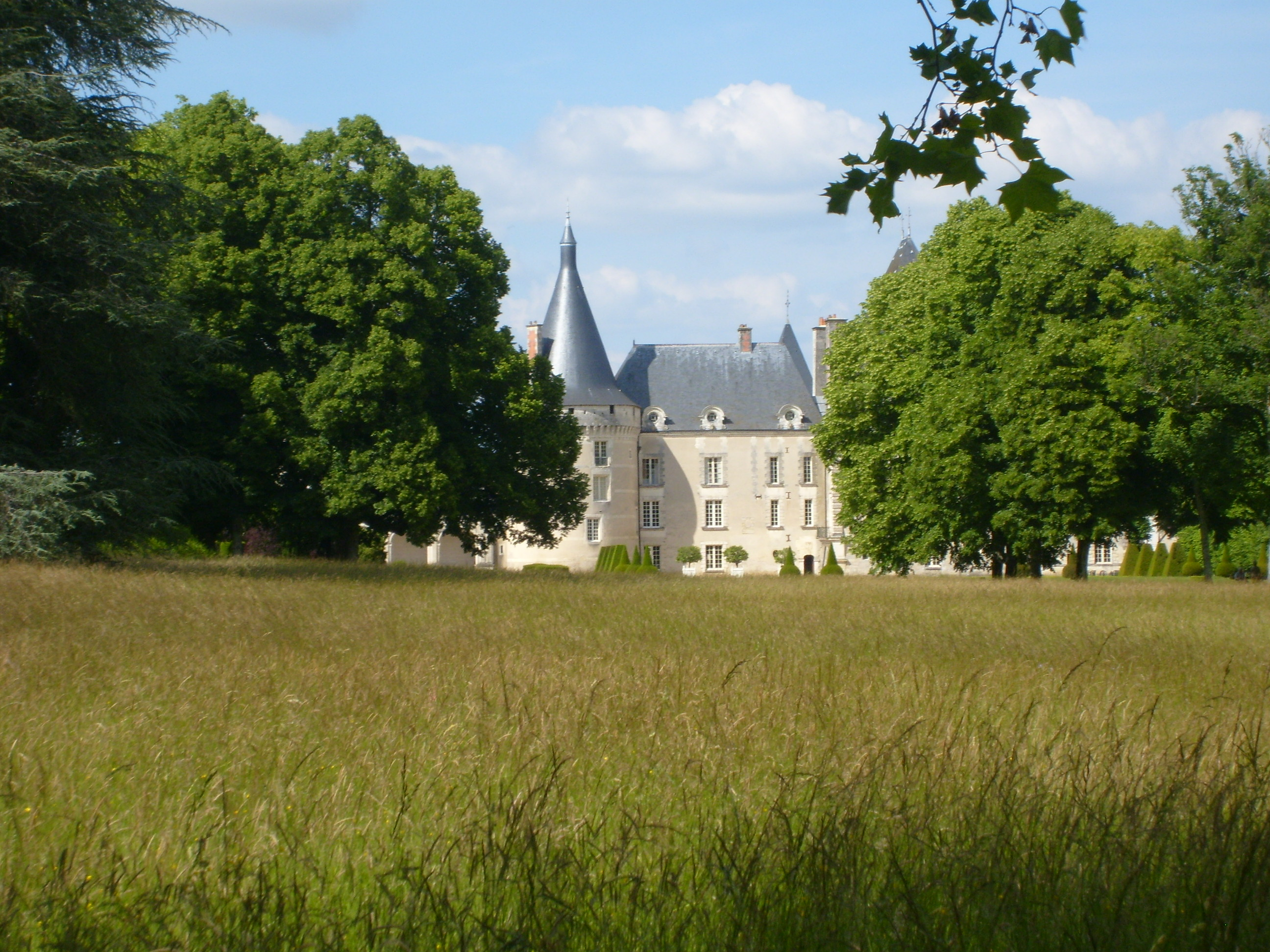
Château viewed from the park

The original park was created in the 17th century, and had an area of fifty hectares, 10 hectares in a landscape park and the rest called a "parc agricole," probably for raising fruits and vegetables. A few of the alignments of the early garden exist, and are carefully preserved.

In 1856 Antoine Luzarche commissioned the Buhler Brothers, landscape architects, to create a French landscape garden, with perspectives, alleys and bosquets of trees, covering an area of eighteen hectares. The new park included an arboretum of exotic trees, including Sequoia trees from California.

Beginning in 1920, Georges Hersent added a classical garden à la française, with broderies and topiary, near the house, integrated with the architecture.

In 1995, the François Rabelais University in Tours created an orchard of pear and apple trees in one part of the park. In 1999, fruit trees on traditional espaliers were grown against the walls, along with table grapes from forty varieties. In 2003, a rose garden with 168 rosebushes of 56 varieties was added to the garden. In 2008, a path was added that traced the history of the rose from Roman times to the present.

== Bibliography ==
- Le Château d'Azay-le-Ferron, text by Véronique Moreau, with Jeane Rejasse, Jean-Pierre Couturier, M.G. Editions, Sandillon, 2008.

== See also ==
- List of castles in France
