= Monchy-Humières =

- Commune
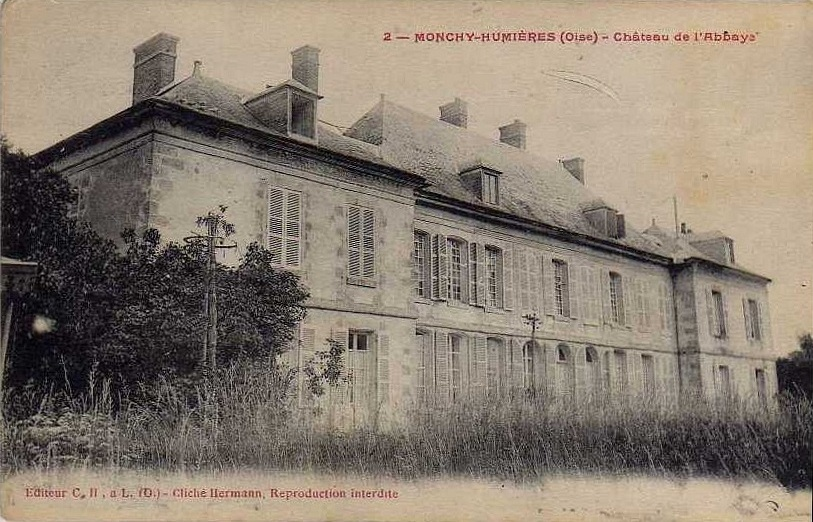
- The old abbey house in Monchy
- Location of Monchy-Humières
- Location within France Location within Hauts-de-France
- Coordinates: 49°28′14″N 2°45′10″E
- Country: France
- Region: Hauts-de-France
- Department: Oise
- Arrondissement: Compiègne
- Canton: Estrées-Saint-Denis
- Intercommunality: Pays des Sources

Government
  - Mayor (2020–2026): Arnaud Luisin
- Area^{1}: 7.8 km^{2} (3.0 sq mi)
- Elevation: 52 m (171 ft)
- Highest elevation: 111 m (364 ft)
- Lowest elevation: 41 m (135 ft)
- Population (2023): 772
  - Density: 99/km^{2} (260/sq mi)
- Time zone: UTC+01:00 (CET)
  - Summer (DST): UTC+02:00 (CEST)
- INSEE/Postal code: 60408 /60113
- ^{1} French Land Register data, which excludes lakes, ponds, glaciers > 1 km^{2} (0.386 sq mi or 247 acres) and river estuaries.

Monchy-Humières (French pronunciation: [mɔ̃ʃi ymjɛʁ]) is a commune in the Oise department in northern France.

== History ==
The original Chateau de Monchy-Humières was destroyed during the 1337 to 1453 Hundred Years War and rebuilt in the 16th century. In 1595, it passed into the family of Louis de Crevant, duc d'Humières (1628-1694); the extensive ornamental gardens he laid out no longer exist but the Chateau still functions as a hotel/golf-club.

Many family members were buried in nearby church of St Martin de Monchy-Humières but as elsewhere, the memorials were destroyed during the French Revolution. In 1936, a sale of contents from the chateau included a full-length marble tomb which had been used as a garden ornament. Long thought to be of Louis de Crevant, it was in fact that of Jean III d'Humières (died 1553) by the sculptor Pierre Bontemps and is now in the Louvre.

== See also ==
- Communes of the Oise department
