= Battle of Walcourt =

1689 battle of the Nine Years' War

- Part of the Nine Years' War
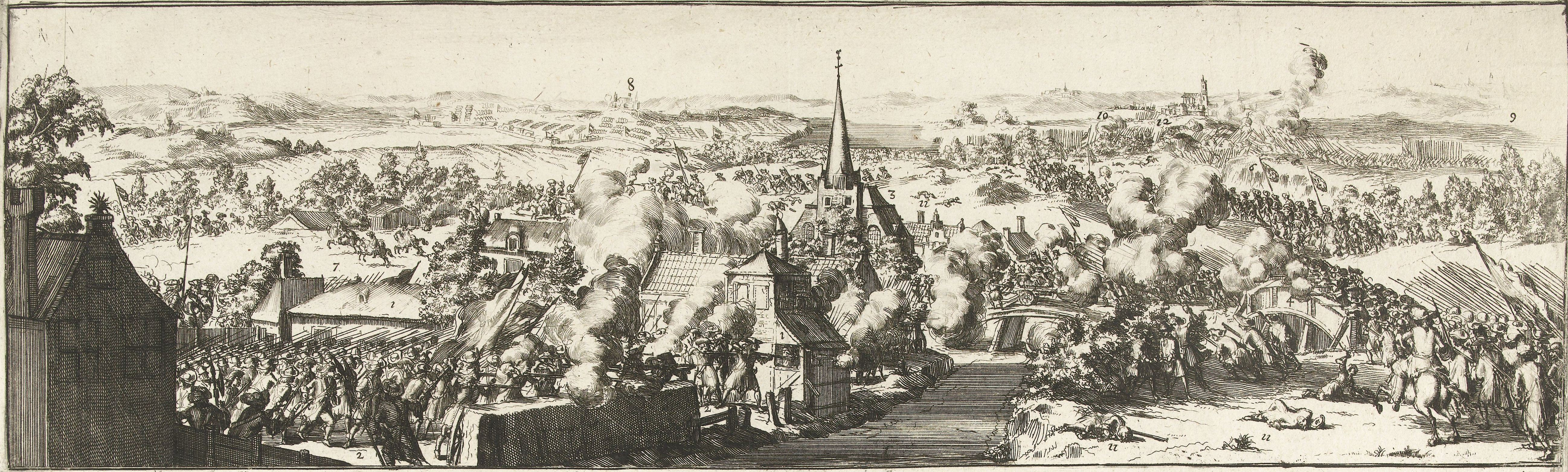
- Battle of Walcourt 1689
| Date | 25 August 1689 |
| Location | Walcourt, Spanish Netherlands (Present-day Belgium) 50°15′0″N 04°25′0″E |
| Result | Allied victory |

Belligerents
| Dutch Republic; England; Scotland; Holy Roman Empire; Spain | France |

Commanders and leaders
| (Dutch Republic) Waldeck (Dutch Republic) Slangenburg (Dutch Republic) Aylva (Kingdom of England) Marlborough | (Kingdom of France) Humières (Kingdom of France) Villars |

Strength
| 30,000–35,000 | 24,000–30,000 |

Casualties and losses
| ~100–700 killed or wounded | 2,000; 600 killed 1,400 wounded or captured |

The Battle of Walcourt was fought on 25 August 1689 during the Nine Years' War. The action took place near the ancient walled town of Walcourt near Charleroi in the Spanish Netherlands, and brought to a close a summer of uneventful marching, manoeuvring, and foraging. The battle was a success for the Grand Alliance – the only significant engagement in the theatre during the campaign of 1689.

The Allied army was commanded by the Prince of Waldeck; the French army by the duc de Humières. The battle incurred some 2,000 French casualties against the Allied losses of less than 700. The Allied victory had been an auspicious opening of the war for King William III and the Alliance, but for Humières, his military reputation received a fatal blow; in the following campaign of 1690, Humières was replaced by the duc de Luxembourg.

== Background ==
In September 1688, King Louis XIV's forces invaded the Rhineland and besieged the German town of Philippsburg. Louis had hoped to compel the powerful German princes, and their Holy Roman Emperor, Leopold I, into converting the 1684 Truce of Ratisbon into a permanent peace, thus confirming Louis' territorial gains of the ‘Reunions’. Other German towns fell in quick succession, including Oppenheim, Kaiserslautern, Heidelberg, and the key fortress of Mainz, but instead of cowering under French aggression, the German princes united against Louis' forces. What was supposed to be a campaign lasting only months, evolved into the Nine Years' War.

By moving into the Rhineland, Louis dispelled fears in the Dutch Republic of a possible attack upon them, thus facilitating Prince William of Orange's invasion of England in November. William's success in the subsequent ‘Glorious Revolution’ – leading to his accession to the English throne in February 1689 (reigning jointly with his wife Mary) – enabled him to bring the full commercial and military power of England into the war against France, and rapidly led to the formation of the coalition he had long desired. On 12 May 1689, the Dutch and Emperor Leopold I signed the Grand Alliance, the aims of which were no less than to force France back to her borders as they were at the end of the Thirty Years War, and the Franco-Spanish War, thus depriving Louis of all his gains since his assumption of power.

The Spanish Netherlands would later become the main theatre of the war, but during the conflict's early stages in 1689, it was considered only a secondary front. This quiescence was because the main protagonists were busy elsewhere: King William was occupied with political matters in England and a Jacobite rebellion in Scotland, whilst King Louis was busy along the Rhine where the powerful German princes were preparing their forces to push the French army back towards the Rhine, and reverse all their earlier setbacks.

== Prelude ==
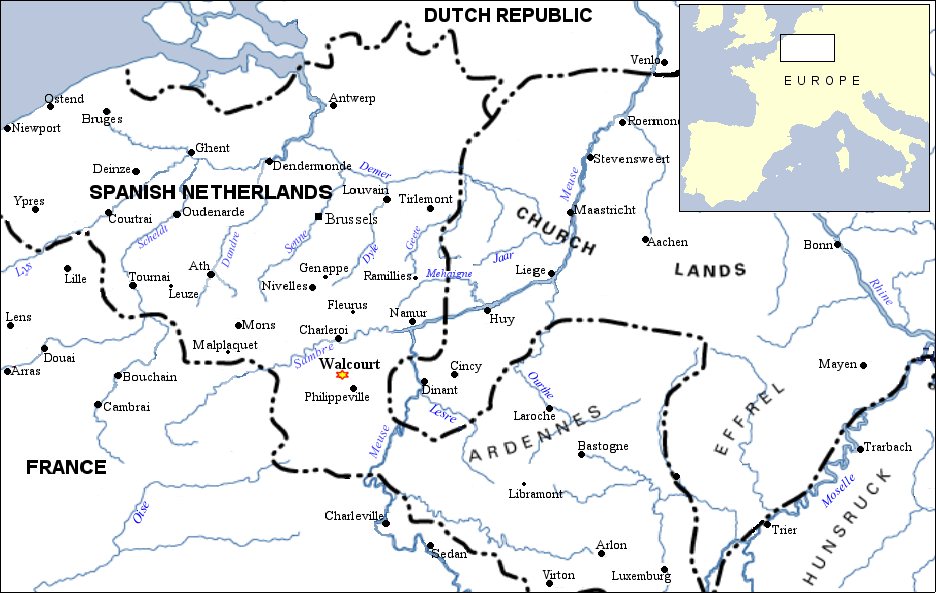
The Spanish Netherlands. Walcourt lies south of Charleroi near the river Sambre.

On 14 May 1689, Humières assembled his army for the new campaign in the Spanish Netherlands near Boussières on the river Sambre, where he marshalled 24 battalions and 75 squadrons, totalling 24,000 men. William entrusted overall command of his 35,000 troops in the theatre to the 69-year-old Prince of Waldeck. The English contingent of 8,000 men was commanded by the Earl of Marlborough, but William remained sceptical about the quality of the English troops; compared to the Dutch troops of the period, the English lacked organisation, field administration, and a commissariat. However, Waldeck watched with interest as Marlborough sought to bring order and organisation to his command, later writing that he hoped the English " … were as disciplined as they were brave" – although by September Waldeck was still lamenting their " … temperament, nonchalance, wretched clothing and the worst of shoes."

Administrative problems and the late arrival of contingents delayed the opening of the Allied offensive in the region until late June. Waldeck moved from near Tienen and headed towards Fleurus; the two armies spent the next two months marching and counter-marching in an attempt to gain a strategic advantage. By 24 August Waldeck had crossed the Sambre and had camped near the small ancient town of Walcourt where he was satisfied to live upon enemy territory.

== Battle ==
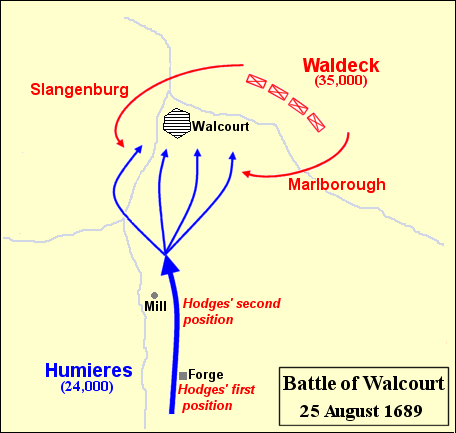

On 25 August, Allied foragers, escorted by 600 English troops of Colonel Hodges' Regiment (16th Foot, later the Bedfordshire and Hertfordshire Regiment) were sent out to the surrounding countryside. Humières, in an effort to expel the intruders, fell upon the foraging parties and allied outposts about 2 miles (~3 km) south of Walcourt. The foragers were recalled and the Allied camp made readiness for action.

For nearly two hours Hodges' regiment was able to prevent the development of the French vanguard, and covered the retreat of the surprised foragers before retiring his troops to a nearby mill (see map). By 11:00, Marlborough had arrived within sight of the engagement. Noticing Hodges was under attack by several French batteries, the English commander ordered the embattled colonel to withdraw to a hill east of Walcourt, behind which the main Allied force was forming. Waldeck later commented to William – "[Hodges] and the English, who are with him, have accomplished miracles, and I could never have believed that so many of the English would show such a joie de combattre."

Despite his troop's failure to overcome Hodges' small force, Humières decided to attack Walcourt itself, which had since been occupied by 600 men. The ground was not favourable to the French – although the defences of the town were antiquated, it stood on a hill partly covered by a river. Nevertheless, several attacks were pressed home, but the French suffered heavy casualties from the Allied enfilading guns. Despite the losses Humières persisted, and sent a party of Gardes Françaises to try to set alight Walcourt's gates. The attempt failed, and the safety of the garrison was assured after Brigadier-General Thomas Tollemache brought the Coldstream Guards and a German Battalion into the town around 14:00.

Humières saw himself forced to widen the battle and now flung his men in an improvised attack against the right wing of the main Allied line beyond the town. However, at about 18:00, Waldeck launched a double counterattack against the tiring French; General Slangenburg's Dutch against their left, and Aylva with three regiments of foot, supported by Marlborough, at the head of the Dutch Horse Guards and the English Life Guards and Blues, against their right. The French reeled back in disarray but valuable service by the French cavalry, commanded by Colonel Villars, prevented the retreat from becoming a rout, allowing Humières to extricate his men from the field.

Among the Scottish Regiments taking part in the battle were the Scots Guards, The Royal Scots, and the Royal Scots Fusiliers.

== Aftermath ==
The battle (the only notable incident in the whole campaign), was sharp and bloody; there had within living memory been no equally serious encounter between the English and French. French losses are estimated at 2,000, and six guns; Allied casualties numbered between 100 and 700. Prince of Waldeck commended the 39-year-old Marlborough to William who " … in spite of his youth" had shown great military aptitude; on 5 September (26 August O.S), in recognition of his endeavours, William awarded Marlborough the lucrative colonelcy of the 7th Foot (later the Royal Fusiliers).

Humières had been humiliated, but due to an infectious disease among his soldiers, Waldeck made little attempt to follow up his success. Mortality was highest among the English since they had not yet learned to build huts and to therefore keep themselves dry and warm. For a few days the two armies remained face to face, cannonading one another at intervals, but no further fighting occurred. Humières returned to the region of the Scheldt fortresses, and Waldeck to Brussels.

The victory at Walcourt had bolstered Allied confidence; but Humières, dubbed le maréchal sans lumière by his colleagues, found himself disgraced. Before Humières went into winter quarters, he detached four battalions of Gardes françaises to march to the Rhineland, where in 1689 Louis' outnumbered forces faced their greatest challenge. But by 1690, the main seat of action of the war returned to Flanders. For this campaign, however, King Louis entrusted command of the theatre to the duc de Luxembourg, who, on 1 July, fought his tactical masterpiece at the Battle of Fleurus.
