= Simon François de Tours =

French painter

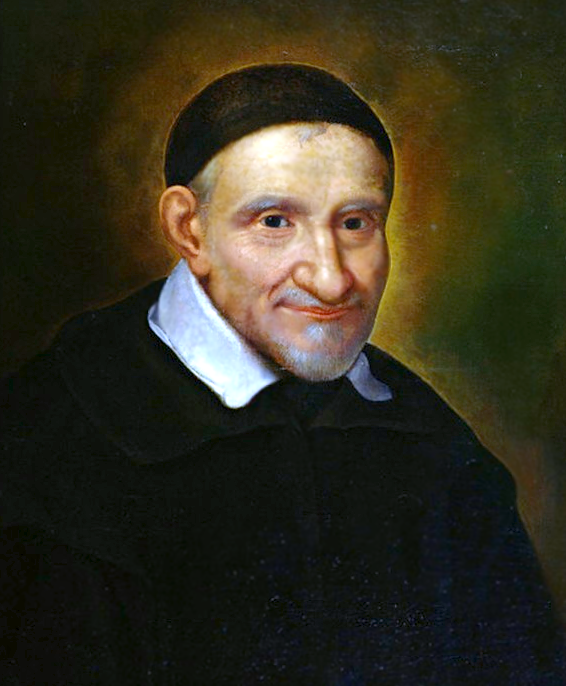
Portrait of Vincent de Paul

Simon François, called Simon François de Tours or Le petit François, a French painter, was born at Tours in 1606. Without the help of a master, he had made some progress in the art, when he went to Italy, where he studied some years. At Bologna he became acquainted with Guido Reni, who made him a present of his portrait, painted by himself. On his return to France he settled in Paris, where he painted the portrait of Louis XIV as Dauphin, and many other distinguished personages, so much to the satisfaction of the court, that he looked forward with confidence to the acquisition of fortune and fame. In these flattering expectations he was, however, disappointed, for he fell into disgrace, and died in obscurity in Paris in 1671. He painted for several churches, and is said to have etched a Magdalen in a Cavern, and a St. Sebastian, two plates of a good design and a noble expression.
