= Emesa helmet =

Archaeological artifact

- The Emesa helmet
- Material: Iron, silver, gold
- Weight: 2.217 kg (4.89 lb)
- Created: Early 1st century AD
- Discovered: 1936; Tell Abu Sabun, Homs, Syria
- Present location: National Museum of Damascus

The Emesa helmet (also known as the Homs helmet) is a Roman cavalry helmet from the early first century AD. It consists of an iron head piece and face mask, the latter of which is covered in a sheet of silver and presents the individualised portrait of a face, likely its owner. Decorations, some of which are gilded, adorn the head piece. Confiscated by Syrian police soon after looters discovered it amidst a complex of tombs in the modern-day city of Homs in 1936, eventually the helmet was restored thoroughly at the British Museum, and is now in the collection of the National Museum of Damascus. It has been exhibited internationally, although as of 2017, due to the Syrian civil war, the more valuable items owned by the National Museum are hidden in underground storage.

Ornately designed yet highly functional, the helmet was probably intended for both parades and battle. Its delicate covering is too fragile to have been put to use during cavalry tournaments, but the thick iron core would have defended against blows and arrows. Narrow slits for the eyes, with three small holes underneath to allow downward sight, sacrificed vision for protection; roughly cut notches below each eye suggest a hastily made modification of necessity.

The helmet was found in a tomb near a monument to a former ruler of Emesa and, considering the lavishness of the silver and gold design, likely belonged to a member of the elite. As it is modelled after those helmets used in Roman tournaments, even if unlikely to have ever been worn in one, it may have been given by a Roman official to a Syrian general or, more likely, manufactured in Syria after the Roman style. The acanthus scroll ornamentation seen on the neck guard recalls that used on Syrian temples, suggesting that the helmet may have been made in the luxury workshops of Antioch.

== Description ==
The neck guard of the Emesa helmet

The Emesa helmet is made of iron and consists of two parts: a head piece and a face mask. The head piece, which includes a neck guard, is made of one piece of iron and attached decorations. Attached to it are silver decorations, some of which are gilded in whole or in part: a diadem, a circular forehead rosette, a strip of metal serving as a crest, two ear guards, and a decorative plate over the neck guard. The ear guards are each attached by three rivets, the top and bottom of which help hold the diadem and decorative plate, respectively, to the head piece; the edges of the diadem and plate are folded over the iron core for additional support. The face mask hangs from the head piece by a central hinge, and would be fastened with straps connecting a loop under each ear with corresponding holes in the neck guard. The entire helmet, the iron core of which is between 1 and 6 millimetres thick, weighs 2.217 kg (4.89 lb), of which the face mask comprises 982 g (2.16 lb).

The head piece is made of iron, now rusted. The top contains a dent, and shows the rusted impression of what once was a woven and likely colourful or patterned fabric. From ear to ear around the forehead runs a gilded diadem in the image of a laurel wreath, a traditional symbol of victory. Each side contains thirteen elements, each of three leaves and two berries. The leaves are worked in repoussé, and stand out in strong relief with nearly straight walls. Above the centre of the diadem is a rosette; it shows a flower with two rows, each of six petals, and an outer beaded border. The beading and the outer row of petals are in white silver, contrasting with the gilding of the inner row, the background, and the central rivet anchoring the rosette to the head piece. A narrow fluted strip serving as a crest, smooth silver with beaded edges, runs down the middle of the head piece from the rosette to the neck guard. The relative simplicity and inferiority of artisanship expressed by the crest and rosette may reflect repairs made locally, away from the luxury workshops of Antioch; unlike with the diadem, for example, the background of the rosette was not carefully punched down, but was flattened with a tubular instrument and now presents as a series of rings.

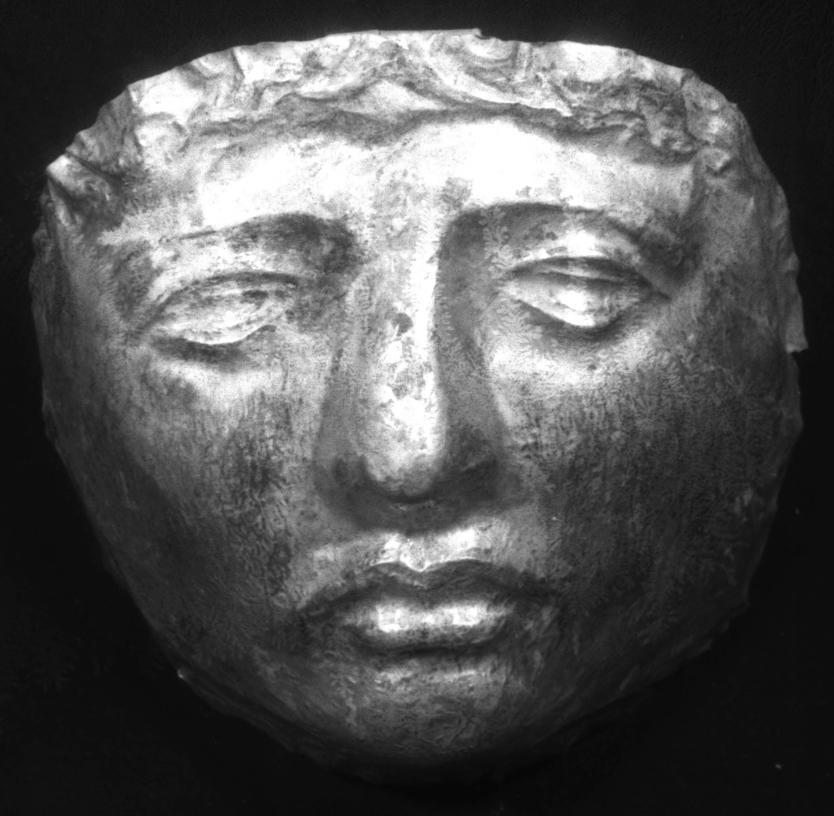
The gold funerary mask from tomb 1

The neck guard, flared outward to protect the shoulders, is covered with a decorative plate consisting of three horizontal designs. At the top, over the base of the skull, a large torus of ivy leaves is bordered by cords; the ivy is gilded, though the cords are not. In the middle, a smooth and concave transitional zone corresponds to the hollow of the neck. At the bottom, an acanthus rinceau, or scroll, is interspersed with birds and butterflies. Portions of the bottom ornamentation are gilded, giving the helmet, with all its silver, gold, and iron components, a polychrome appearance. The ear guards encroach slightly on the bottom design, suggesting that they were not created specifically for the helmet.

The face mask is made of iron, and covered with a sheet of silver. The central hinge from which it hangs is made of three parts: an iron tube welded to the interior head piece with an exterior silver tube, a notched silver tube fixed to the face mask that envelops the first part, and a pin which passes through both and has a silver knob at each end. The mask is shaped in the form of a human face. Holes are drilled between the lips and as nostrils; the eyes each have a narrow slit, with three holes in a trefoil design, two round holes outside and a heart-shaped hole in the middle, underneath each eye to allow for a greater range of vision. These apparently were not enough, for a small and rudimentary notch was carved into each of the heart-shaped holes to increase the wearer's vision. The mask is approximately 2 millimetres thick, of which the silver, which is folded around both the edges and each hole to hold it to the iron, accounts for between .25 and .5 millimetres.

Distinctive features cover the face mask. The nose is long and fleshy with a prominent bump, and extends high between the eyes. The cheekbones are low yet prominent, and the small mouth, which droops toward the sinister side, shows a thick lower lip. Other features—the eyes and eyebrows, and the chin—are more conventional. The distinctive features suggest that the maker of the Emesa helmet attempted to translate some of the individual characteristics of the wearer's face into the helmet.

== Function ==
The Emesa helmet is highly functional, and was likely made for both parades and battle. It is thick and heavy, which would have offered protection against heavy blows or arrows, the former of which may have caused the dent on the head piece. Exceptionally narrow eye-slits also indicate care taken to increase protection; the rough manner in which the holes underneath were enlarged is likely the consequence of an emergency requiring a better field of vision. Although classified as a cavalry sports helmet, the type worn in equestrian displays and tournaments known as the hippika gymnasia, it was unlikely to have been used in such events. Tournament helmets were robust and manufactured without finesse, to withstand the rigours of contest unscathed. The delicate ornamentation of the Emesa helmet, by contrast, would have been damaged easily, and thus suggests that it would have only been subjected to such risks in the exceptional circumstance of battle.

== Discovery ==
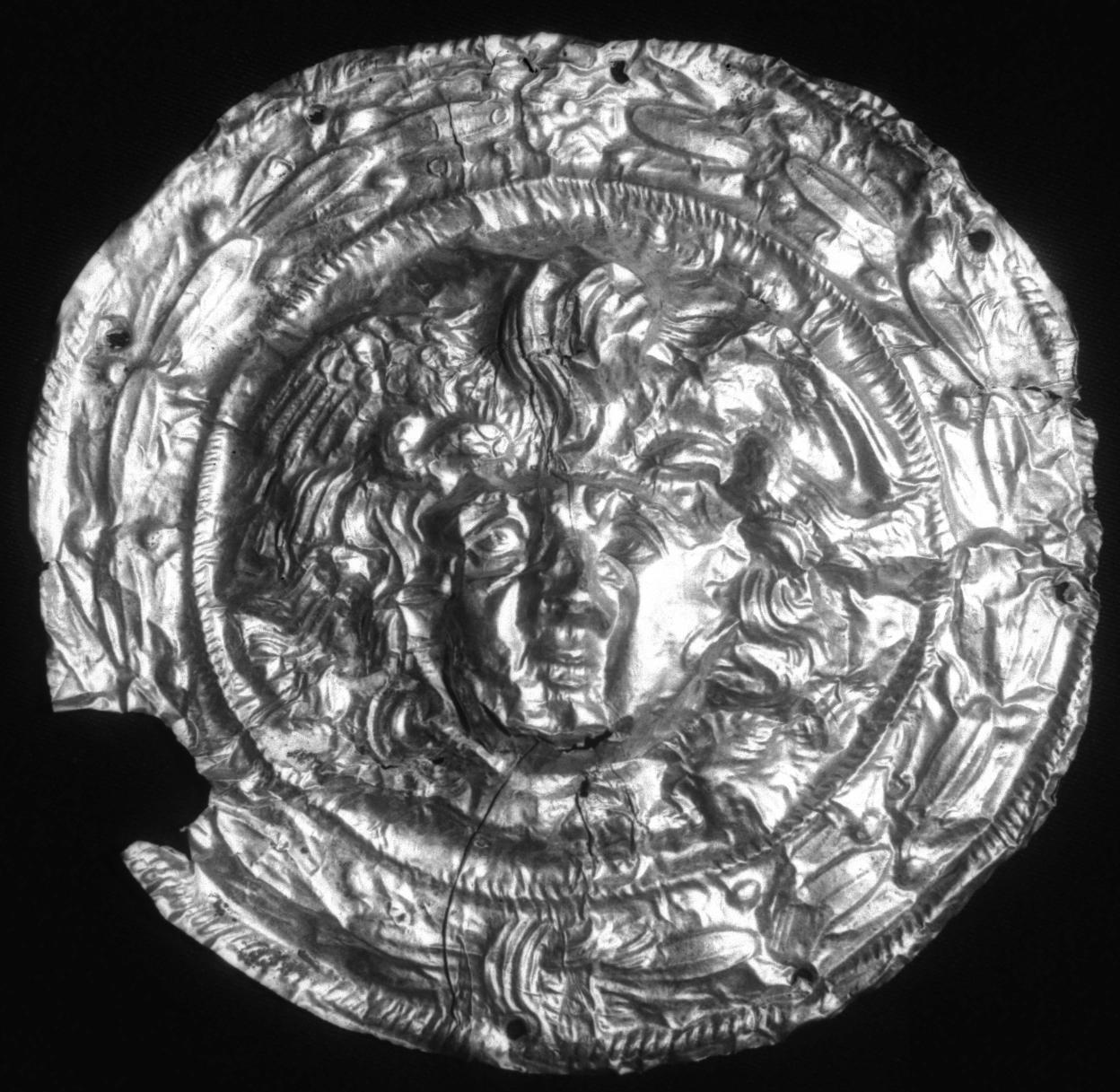
One of six Medusa ornaments from tomb 1's sarcophagus

The helmet was discovered by looters in August 1936, in the modern-day city of Homs. Known as Emesa at the start of the first century AD, the city was at the eastern edge of the Roman Empire, and ruled by the Emesene dynasty, a client kingdom of the Romans. Nearly 2,000 years later, the looters—digging near the former site of a monument to Sampsiceramus—found a complex of rich tombs, and removed the grave goods. Their looting was uncovered because small golden plaques, adorning the burial shroud of the body in tomb 11, flaked off when disturbed. The next morning, children noticed these gold flakes mixed in with the earth and brought them to a bazaar, where it came to the attention of the police; it ultimately led to the arrest of the looters, and the confiscation of the grave objects. The objects, including the helmet, were then secured for the state collection by Emir Djaafar Abd el-Kader, curator of the National Museum of Damascus—even as merchants, eager to capitalise on the stories, hawked modern forgeries and unrelated ancient objects said to come from the tombs of Emesa.

The prompt intervention of el-Kader, who investigated the finds and interrogated the looters, allowed the finds to be recovered and well-understood. He also led further excavations, as did the French archaeologists Daniel Schlumberger and Henri Seyrig. The tomb in which the helmet was found—labelled tomb number 1, of the 22 in the complex—was a pitted grave with two chambers, one upper and one lower. The lower chamber, constituting the proper tomb, had soil for a floor and rock for walls; it measured 2.2 by 1.25 m (7 ft 3 in by 4 ft 1 in), and was 1.72 m (5 ft 8 in) high. Between five and seven eroded basalt beams were placed over the opening connecting the lower chamber with the upper, which was then backfilled to surface level.

Tomb 1 included a rich assortment of objects. As well as the helmet, it contained a gold funerary mask; a gold and turquoise bracelet; an ornate gold ring with a royal bust in relief; a gold ring with carnelian intaglio; a gold appliqué with a sheep's head and a bird's head; a star-shaped fibula; a gold hook; a small tongue of gold; a spearhead decorated with gold; a silver vase; and a triangle of glass. The looters may have been incorrect in also attributing 19 gold plaques to the tomb, as these were seemingly identical to those from tomb 11. Decorations from the sarcophagus included fragmentary silver rings; 22 gold leaves in repoussé; six masks of Medusa; four rectangles adorned with a lion; four Victories; and eight busts of Apollo. According to Mohammed Moghrabi, who looted tomb 1, the helmet was found next to the skull.

=== Restoration ===
30 April 1955 front cover of The Illustrated London News, issued shortly after the helmet's restoration

After its discovery, the Emesa helmet underwent several unsuccessful restorations. The primary problem was the oxidisation of the iron core, which created blisters and cracks in the silver covering. Immediately after discovery, the helmet was sent to Paris for restoration by "MM. André père et fils"; only light work was carried out due to the hope that the Syrian climate would help slow the rate of oxidisation, and due to limited funds, but the helmet continued to deteriorate. By 1952, the helmet was described as being significantly more damaged than it had been when excavated, and in urgent need of further work. Eventually it was taken to the British Museum, where a final restoration was finished in 1955. This was done by Herbert Maryon, who in 1946 had reconstructed the Anglo-Saxon Sutton Hoo helmet. In 1956, an account of the process was published by Harold Plenderleith, keeper of the museum's research laboratory. Examination found the silver to be brittle, with cracks that had been filled in by a dark stopping substance. The iron behind the face mask had rusted, putting further stress on the silver and forcing the cracks open by as much as 4 millimetres (0.16 in). The face mask—held on by wire, as the hinge had detached—was therefore removed from the helmet to be worked on.

The rusted iron was cut out from the back of the face mask around the mouth and jaw, where the distortions were greatest. To strengthen the silver enough that it could be manipulated, the mask was placed in an electric furnace, and the temperature raised to 310 °C (590 °F) over three hours; blackened rust was then removed by brushing the mask with 9% oxalic acid, before heating it again, at 600 °C (1,112 °F) for eighteen hours and at 650 °C (1,202 °F) for thirteen. The silver was then cleaned again, on both sides, with silver gauze temporarily soldered over the cracks in the back to allow the front to be wiped down. The gauze was removed, the silver manipulated to close the cracks, and new gauze installed, permanently, using soft solder. Thin lines of solder showing through the closed cracks were concealed with a surface coating of applied silver. Finally, the iron that had been removed to expose the back of the silver was cleaned and placed back in position. Although a few cracks remained visible higher up on the face mask, they were closed, as the iron behind them was sound and not exerting pressure, yet would have to be removed for restoration to occur.

=== Display ===
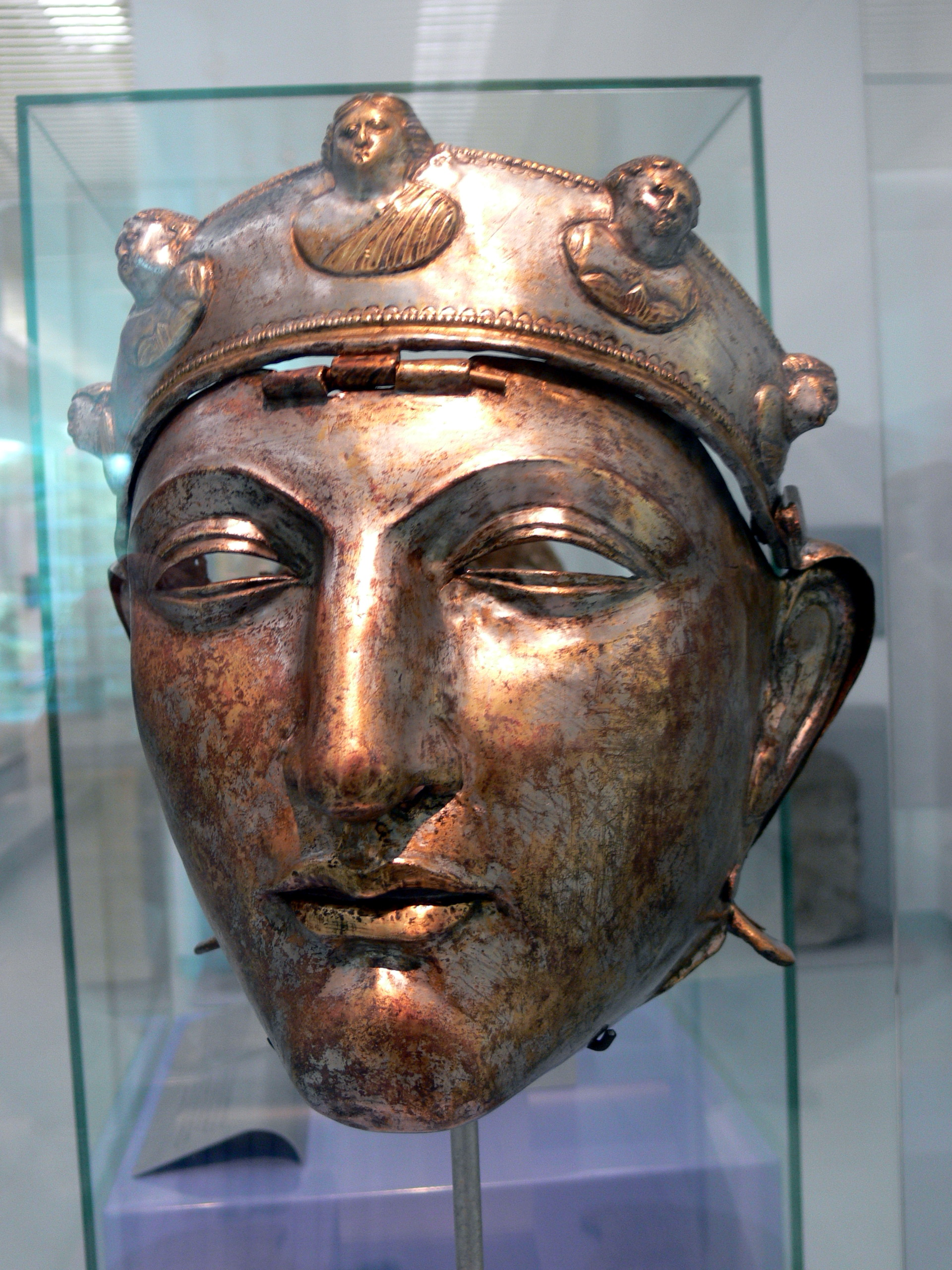
The Nijmegen helmet is also classified as a cavalry sports helmet.

After restoration at the British Museum, the helmet was displayed in the museum's King Edward Gallery as a month-long loan from 25 April 1955, then returned to Damascus. From 1999 to 2002 the helmet was part of a travelling exhibition, Syria: Land of Civilizations, with stops in Switzerland, Canada, and the United States. In 2017 the National Museum reopened after closing during the Syrian Civil War, but with the more valuable objects still hidden in underground storage.

== Typology ==
The helmet is dated to the first half of the first century AD, based on the style of the acanthus scroll on the back of the helmet, and other objects found with the helmet and in the tombs nearby. It is the earliest known Roman helmet with a face mask, and is broadly classified as a cavalry sports helmet—type D, according to the typology put forward by H. Russell Robinson. Type D helmets are characterised by a single horizontal hinge attaching the face mask to the head piece, and by head pieces that are decorated to represent helmets. (Note: This is in contrast to type C helmets, for example, which show idealistically youthful faces and head pieces with wavy hair.) Several type D examples exist, such as the Nijmegen helmet, but unlike these, the Emesa helmet was probably never intended for sporting use. It may instead have been given as a gift by a Roman official to a general of the ruling family of Emesa, or manufactured in Syria to the likeness of helmets seen during Roman tournaments. The latter circumstance is thought more likely, for the acanthus ornamentation resembles that seen on Syrian temples. The helmet may therefore have been commissioned from the workshops of Antioch, known for their luxury.

== See also ==
- Necropolis of Emesa
- Tomb of Sampsigeramus – which belonged to the same necropolis
