= Humières =

- Commune
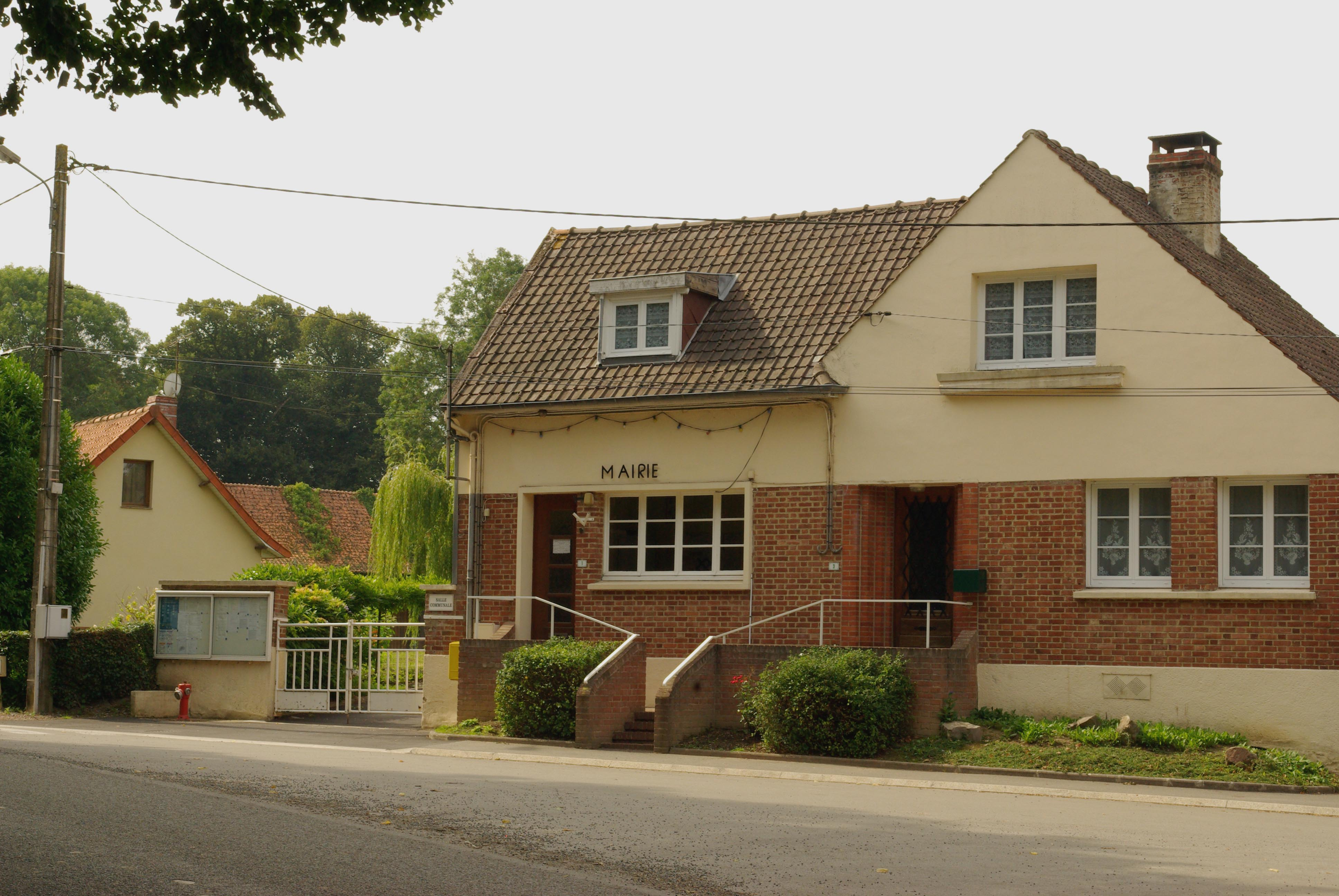
- The town hall of Humieres

- Coat of arms
- Location of Humières
- Location within France Location within Hauts-de-France
- Coordinates: 50°23′20″N 2°12′29″E
- Country: France
- Region: Hauts-de-France
- Department: Pas-de-Calais
- Arrondissement: Arras
- Canton: Saint-Pol-sur-Ternoise
- Intercommunality: CC Ternois

Government
  - Mayor (2020–2026): Sébastien Bocquillon
- Area^{1}: 6.81 km^{2} (2.63 sq mi)
- Elevation: 128 m (420 ft)
- Highest elevation: 133 m (436 ft)
- Lowest elevation: 83 m (272 ft)
- Population (2023): 218
  - Density: 32.0/km^{2} (82.9/sq mi)
- Time zone: UTC+01:00 (CET)
  - Summer (DST): UTC+02:00 (CEST)
- INSEE/Postal code: 62468 /62130
- ^{1} French Land Register data, which excludes lakes, ponds, glaciers > 1 km^{2} (0.386 sq mi or 247 acres) and river estuaries.

Humières (French pronunciation: [ymjɛʁ]) is a commune in the Pas-de-Calais department in the Hauts-de-France region of France 28 miles (45 km) west of Arras.

== Population ==
Historical population
Year	Pop.	±% p.a.
1968	248	—
1975	224	−1.44%
1982	243	+1.17%
1990	219	−1.29%
1999	232	+0.64%
2007	228	−0.22%
2012	217	−0.98%
2017	229	+1.08%
2023	218	−0.82%
Source: INSEE

== See also ==
- Communes of the Pas-de-Calais department
