= Necropolis of Emesa =

Ancient necropolis in Syria

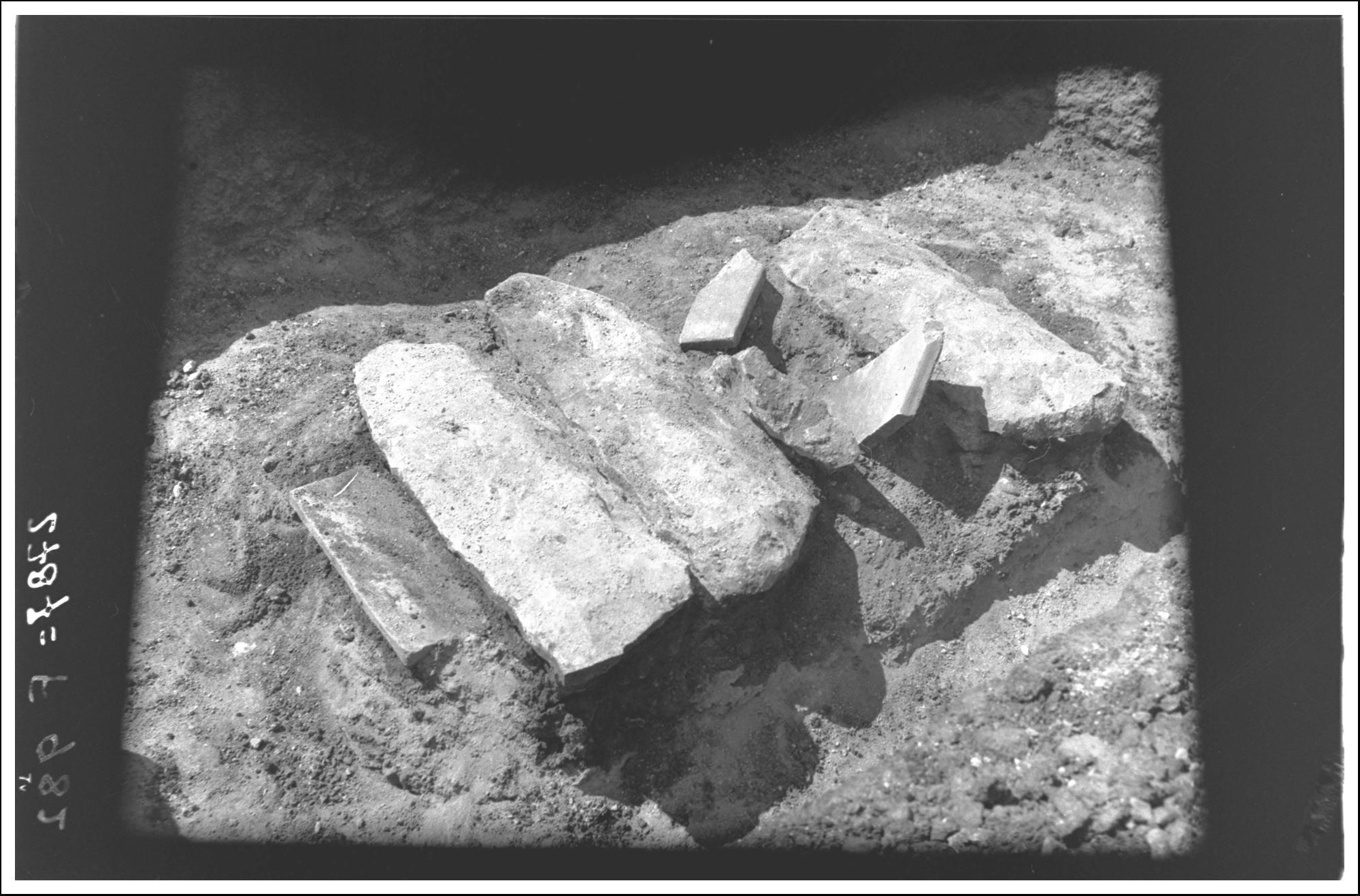
- Tomb 14

- Location within Syria
- 34°43′48″N 36°41′52″E
- Location: Homs, Syria

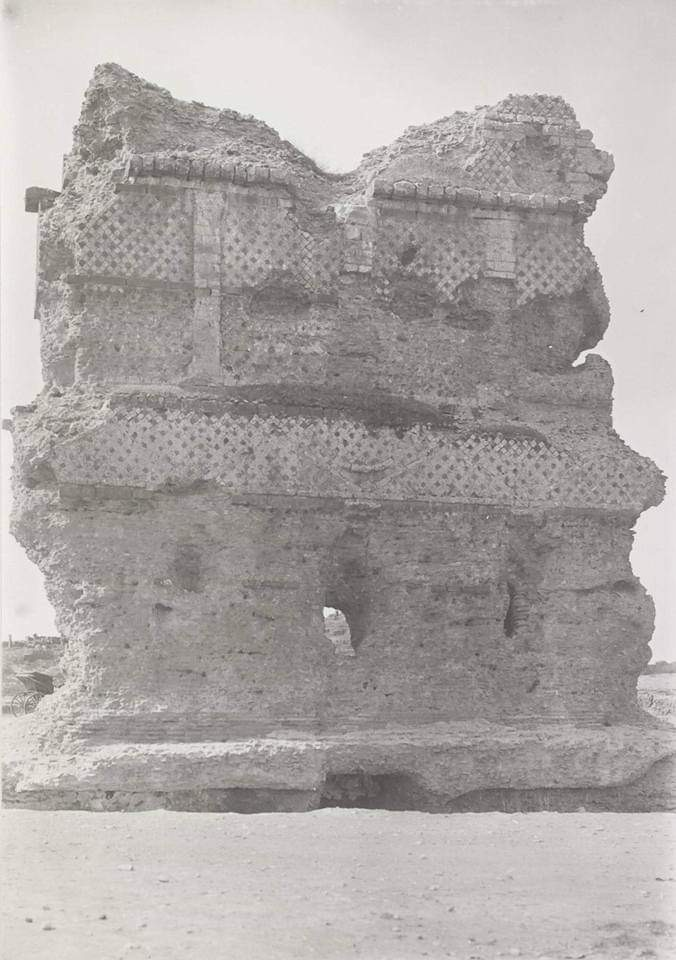
The Tomb of Sampsigeramus, photographed 1907

The necropolis of Emesa, also known as the necropolis of Tell Abu Sabun, was an ancient necropolis of modern-day Homs, in Syria. Excavations begun in August 1936 uncovered a total of 22 tombs before the greater part of this necropolis was made to disappear by 1952 in order to build the municipal stadium known today as Khalid ibn al-Walid Stadium. Among the artifacts found in these tombs was the Emesa helmet. The Tomb of Sampsigeramus, of which the remains had been blown up c. 1911 by the Ottoman authorities so as to make room for an oil depot, had also belonged to the necropolis.

The Emesa helmet (Tomb 1)

According to Michaela Konrad, the nature of the artefacts unearthed in grave no. 1 allow us to date it to the beginning of the first century CE, and to assume that it belonged to a member of the ruling dynasty. The discoveries from graves no. 11 and 6 also show that here too were buried individuals connected to the ruling house. The majority of the artifacts found were heavily influenced by Parthian-Iranian culture, and even Central Asian traditions. Only a few of them came from the Roman world; they were found particularly in grave no. 1, confirming that the deceased had close relations with the rulers of Rome.

== Sources ==
- Dąbrowa, Edward (2017). "Michaela Konrad, Emesa zwischen Klientelreich und Provinz. Identitätswandel einer lokalen Fürstendynastie im Spiegel der archäologischen Quellen (Orient-Archäologie – 34), Verlag Marie Leidorf GmbH, Rhaden/Wesft. 2014, pp. 108, ill. b/w + tab. 7, ISBN 978-389646-664-8; ISSN 1434-162X". Electrum. 24. doi:10.4467/20800909EL.17.036.7518.
- Kropp, Andreas (2010). "Earrings, Nefesh and Opus Reticulatum: Self-Representation of the Royal House of Emesa in the First Century AD". In Kaizer, Ted; Facella, Margherita (eds.). Kingdoms and Principalities in the Roman Near East. Franz Steiner Verlag Stuttgart.
- Kropp, Andreas J. M. (2013). Images and Monuments of Near Eastern Dynasts, 100 BC—AD 100. Oxford University Press. ISBN 9780199670727.
- Seyrig, Henri (1952). "Antiquités Syriennes 53: Antiquités de la Nécropole d'Émèse (1^{re} partie)". Syria. XXIX (3–4): 204–250. doi:10.3406/syria.1952.4788. JSTOR 4390311. (in French)
- Seyrig, Henri (1953). "Antiquités Syriennes 53 (suite): Antiquités de la Nécropole d'Émèse". Syria. XXX (1–2): 12–50. doi:10.3406/syria.1953.4859. (in French)
