= Azay-le-Ferron =

- Commune
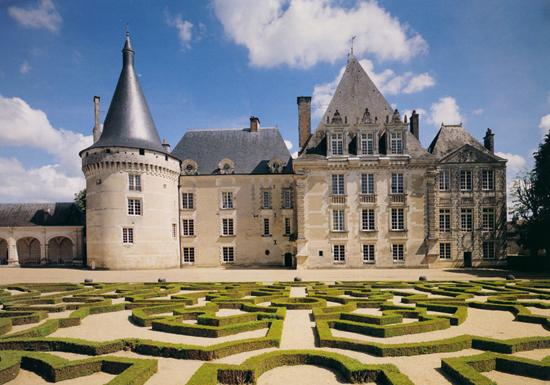
- Chateau

- Coat of arms
- Location of Azay-le-Ferron
- Location within France Location within Centre-Val de Loire
- Coordinates: 46°51′09″N 1°04′12″E
- Country: France
- Region: Centre-Val de Loire
- Department: Indre
- Arrondissement: Le Blanc
- Canton: Le Blanc
- Intercommunality: CC Cœur Brenne

Government
  - Mayor (2020–2026): Christophe Jubert
- Area^{1}: 60.95 km^{2} (23.53 sq mi)
- Elevation: 102 m (335 ft)
- Highest elevation: 143 m (469 ft)
- Lowest elevation: 77 m (253 ft)
- Population (2023): 817
  - Density: 13.4/km^{2} (34.7/sq mi)
- Time zone: UTC+01:00 (CET)
  - Summer (DST): UTC+02:00 (CEST)
- INSEE/Postal code: 36010 /36290
- ^{1} French Land Register data, which excludes lakes, ponds, glaciers > 1 km^{2} (0.386 sq mi or 247 acres) and river estuaries.

Azay-le-Ferron (French pronunciation: [azɛ lə fɛʁɔ̃]) is a commune in the Indre department in central France.

It is situated in the parc naturel régional de la Brenne, spanning parts of the historic province of Berry and Touraine. Azay-Le-Ferron takes its name from ironworks, from which iron was extracted as late as the nineteenth century, and a deformation of aqua, "water".

The Château d'Azay-le-Ferron, upon which the ancient commune depended, ranges from fifteenth century construction—the round tower—to eighteenth century, harmonized by the warm stone of which it is built and the blue-gray slates of its various roofs. The ancestral seat of the family Hersent Luzarche, bequeathed to the city of Tours in 1951, now houses a collection of furniture, both of the French Renaissance and in Empire style. It is surrounded by a series of parterre gardens, some with clipped topiary, and a landscaped park.

== Population ==
Historical population
| Year | Pop. | ±% p.a. |
|---|---|---|
| 1968 | 1,364 | — |
| 1975 | 1,314 | −0.53% |
| 1982 | 1,146 | −1.94% |
| 1990 | 1,036 | −1.25% |
| 1999 | 991 | −0.49% |
| 2007 | 942 | −0.63% |
| 2012 | 869 | −1.60% |
| 2017 | 862 | −0.16% |
| 2023 | 817 | −0.89% |
Source: INSEE

== See also ==
- Communes of the Indre department
