= Sainte-Chapelle de Vincennes =

Chapel located in Vincennes, Val-de-Marne, France

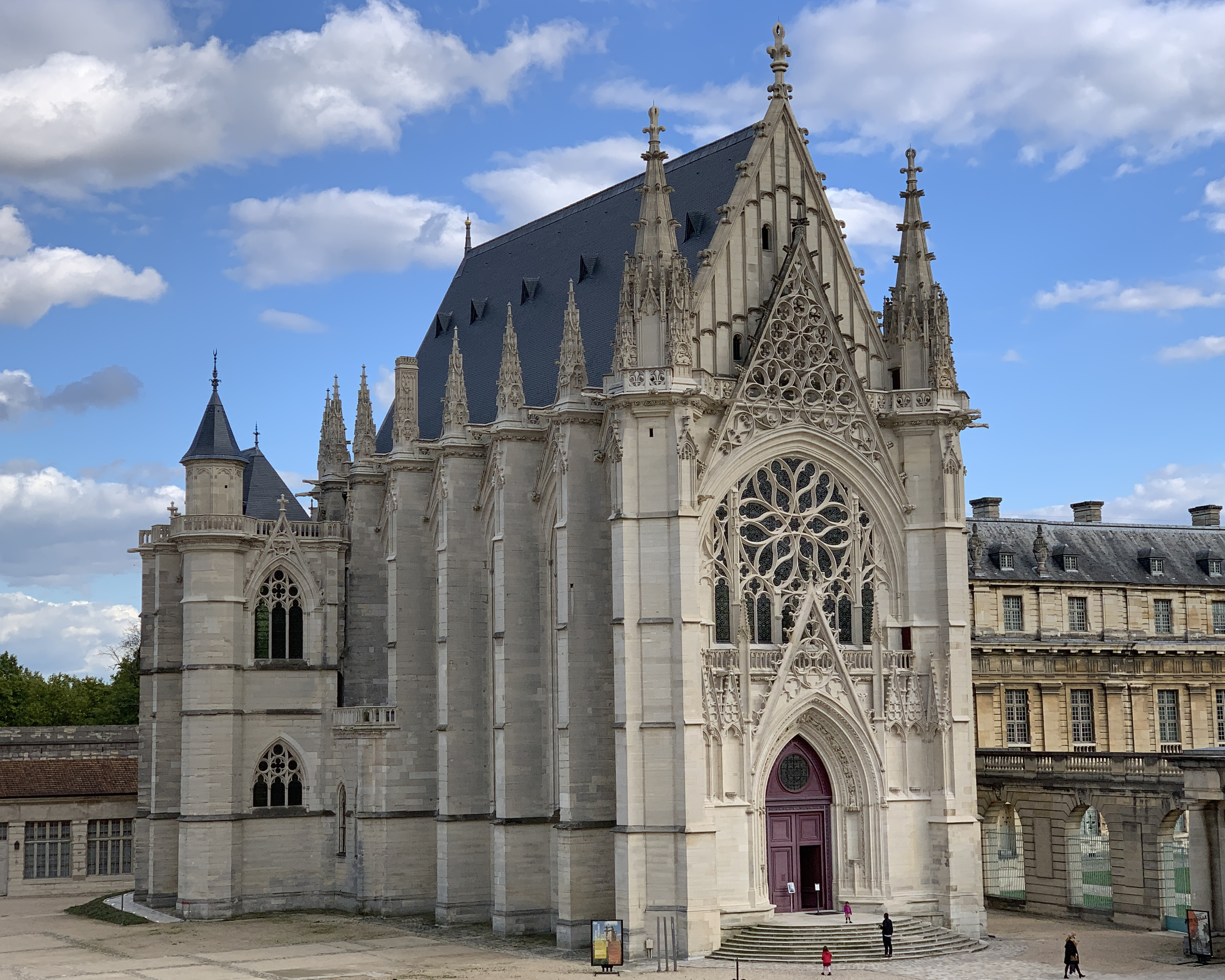
- Interactive map of the Sainte-Chapelle de Vincennes area

General information
- Type: Royal chapel
- Architectural style: Gothic
- Location: Château de Vincennes, Vincennes, France
- Coordinates: 48.8423°N 2.4364°E
- Construction started: 1379
- Inaugurated: 1552

The Sainte-Chapelle de Vincennes is a Gothic royal chapel within the fortifications of the Château de Vincennes on the east edge of Paris, France. It was inspired by the Sainte-Chapelle, the royal chapel within the Palais de la Cité in Paris. It was begun in 1379 by Charles V of France to house relics of the Passion of Christ. It is no longer used as a church, and is now a French historical monument operated by the Centre des monuments nationaux.

== History ==
=== Royal chapel ===
In 1373 King Charles V of France purchased a plot of land for a secondary residence in a forested domain close to Paris, near a main road and the banks of the river Marne. He built a manor, which he named "Beauté" or "Beauty". It was a rectangular two-story structure surrounded by a wall. The manor was well underway when King decided to build a chapel alongside the residence. It was planned to be similar in form to the Sainte-Chapelle in Paris, constructed by Louis IX between 1242 and 1248, to contain a collection of sacred relics which he purchased from the Emperor of Constantinople. It was begun in November 1379, but the King died in 1380 when construction was just underway.

After the death of Charles V, work on the chapel continued under his successor Charles VI. During the latter's reign the choir, the two oratories, the sacristy and the treasury were all completed, with the treasury housing the relics. Construction of the nave continued, but the work slowed during the Hundred Years' War. After the French defeat at the Battle of Agincourt in 1415, the chateau and unfinished chapel were occupied by King Henry V of England. He died in Vincennes in 1422. The chateau and chapel returned to French possession under Charles VII in February 1437, but the King spent little time in Paris or Vincennes.

The chapel was organised and functioned in the same way as Sainte-Chapelle in Paris, and very differently from a cathedral or ordinary church. It was under the patronage of the Virgin Mary and Holy Trinity. Like Sainte-Chapelle in Paris, its single official function was, by continual services, to ask for divine protection for the King and the royal family. For this purpose it was served by a chapter of fifteen canons. In addition to the chapel, the King had a separate chapel and oratory in his residence, and another within the fortified keep of the Chateau.

The chapel was still unfinished in the 16th century. In 1520 King Francis I, who was a frequent resident, decided to complete it to celebrate the birth of his son and heir. After the death of Francis in 1547, Henry II took up the work: in 1547 and 1548, he finished the vaults, installed the carved woodwork in the interior and put in place the stained glass windows. The chapel was finally dedicated by Henry II in 1552.

=== Revolution and restoration (17th–19th centuries) ===
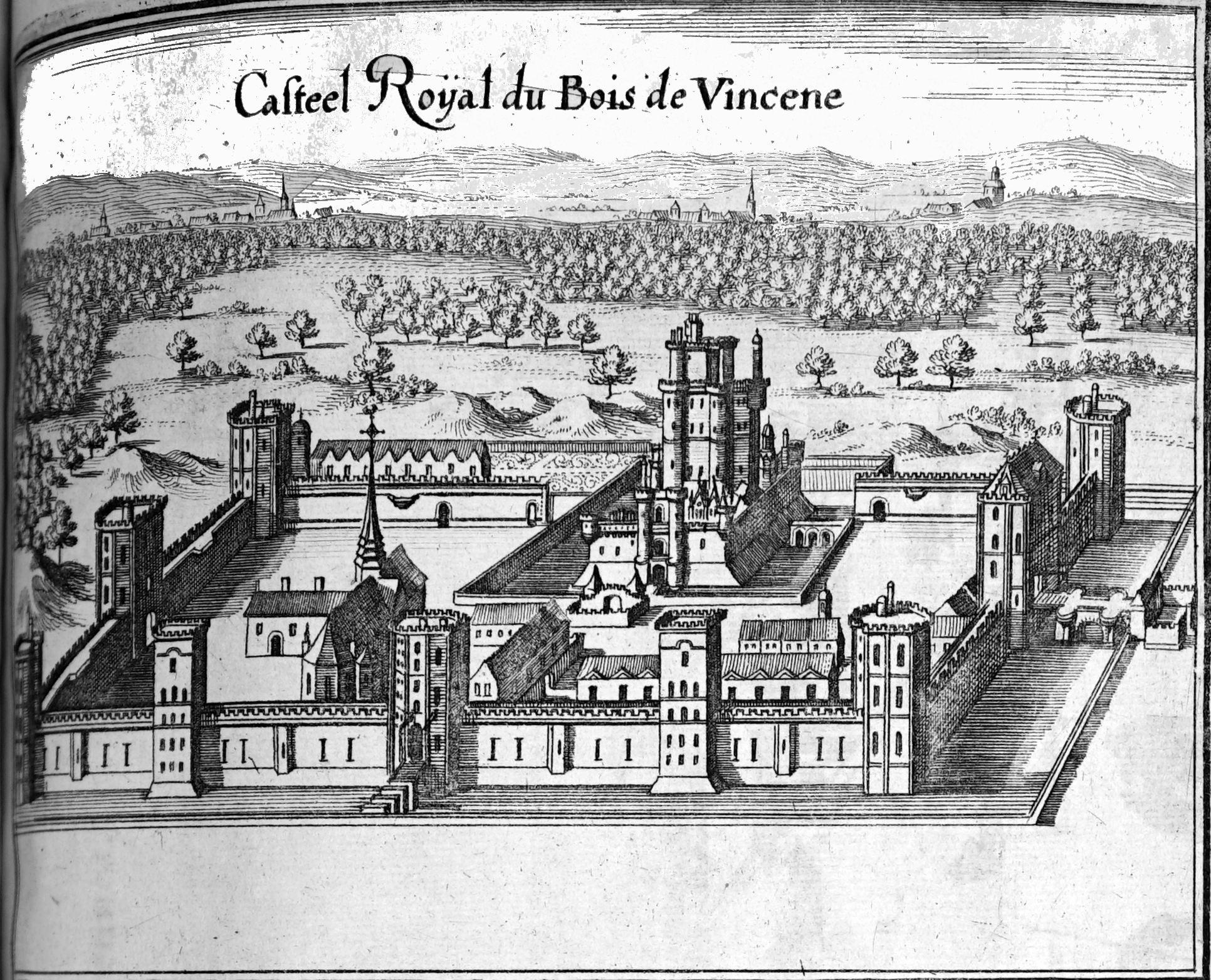
The Chateau and chapel in 1656

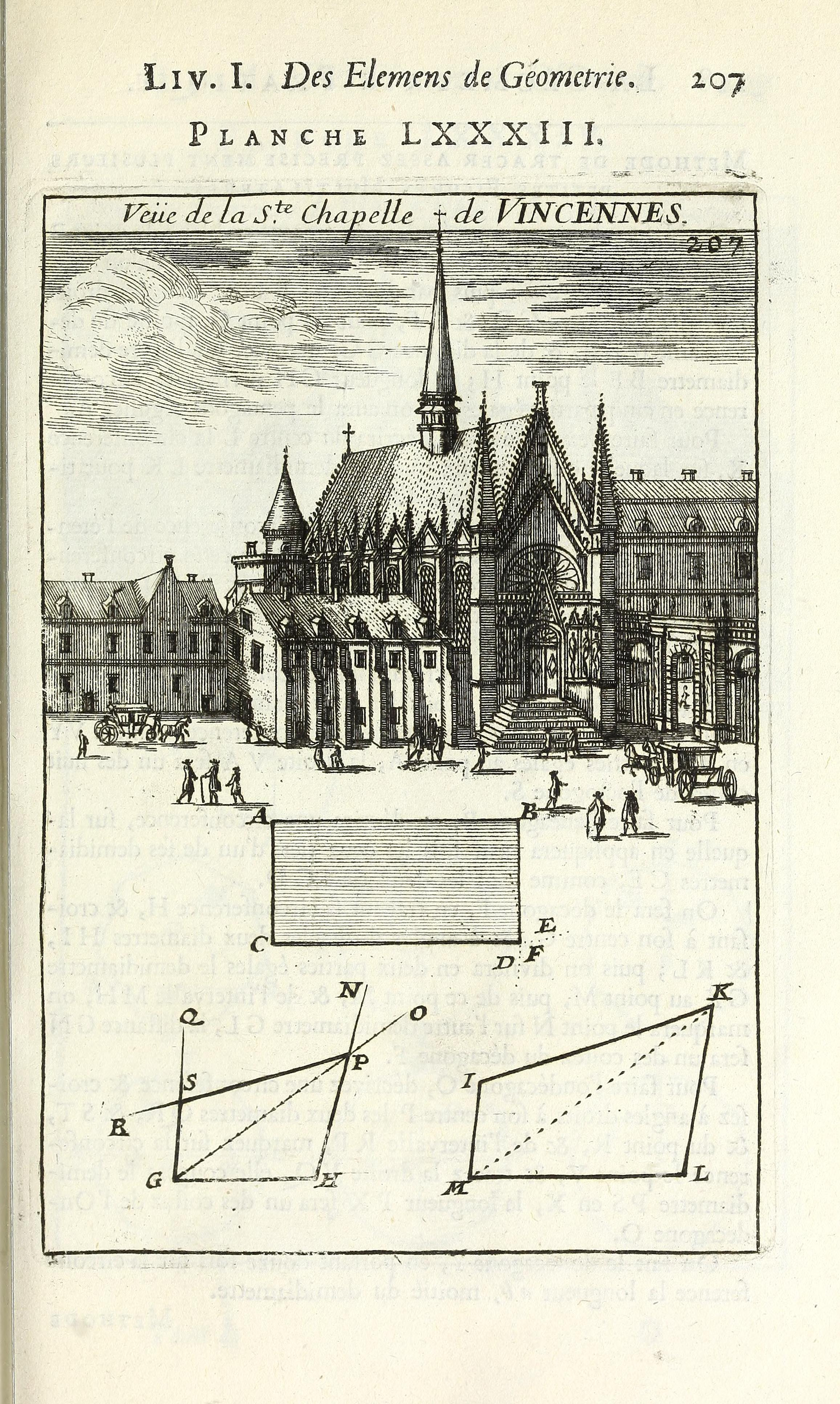
The chapel with flèche, in a geometry textbook (1702)

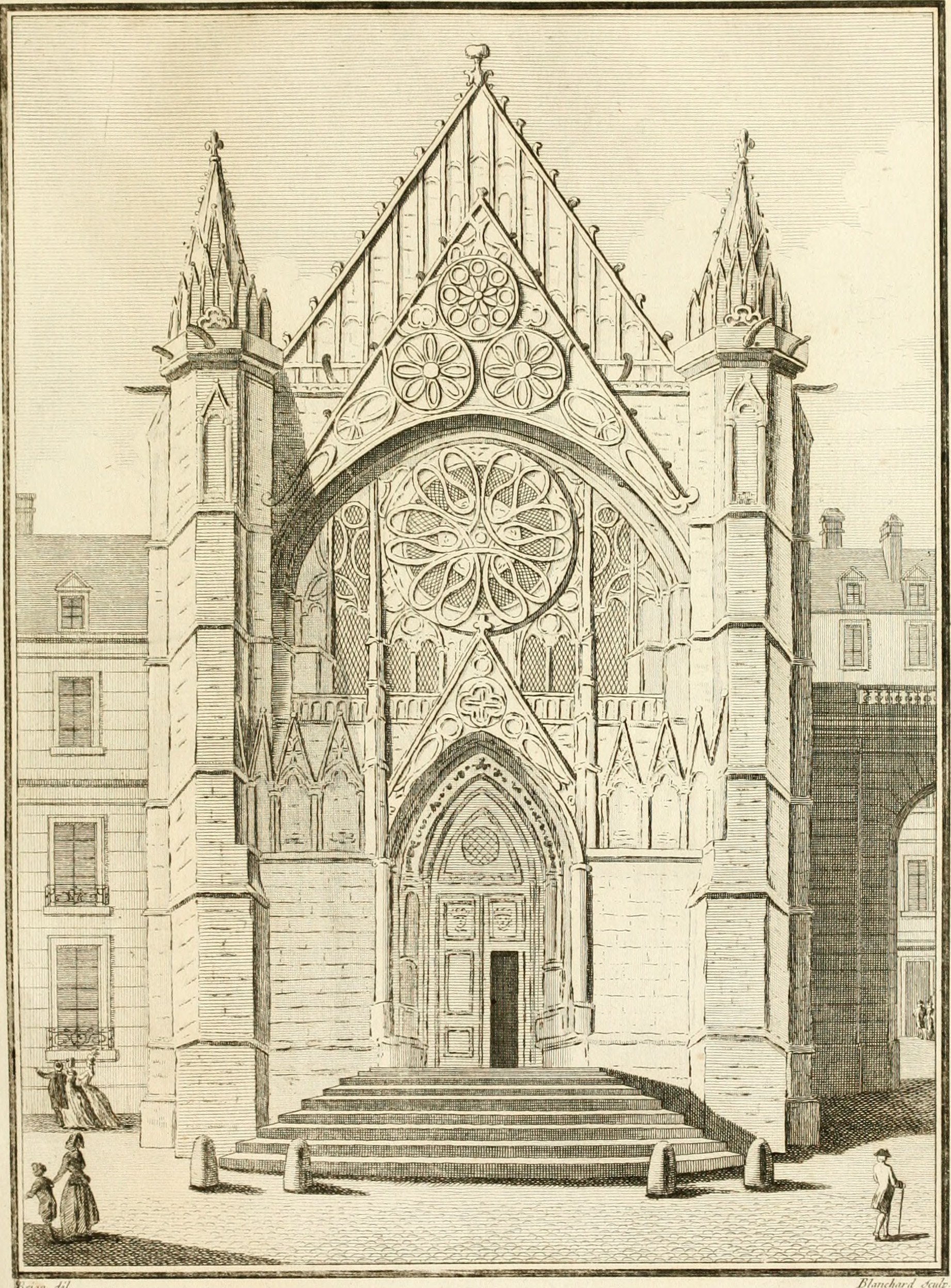
The chapel west front in 1790

By the end of the 18th century, with the King in permanent residence at the Palace of Versailles, the chapel was rarely used. The chateau was removed from the list of official royal residences in 1754, and the College of Canons of the chapel, which prayed continually for the King's health and safety, was abolished in 1787.

During the French Revolution, the chateau and the chapel were a natural target for the fury of the sans-culottes. At the end of February 1791, a mob of more than a thousand workers from the Faubourg Saint-Antoine, encouraged by members of the Cordeliers Club and led by Antoine Joseph Santerre, marched out to the château, where, according to rumours, the royalists were preparing to install political prisoners, and set about demolishing it with crowbars and pickaxes. They were stopped by the Marquis de Lafayette, who took several ringleaders prisoner.

The sans-culottes returned in force in 1793, and this time met little resistance. They attacked the chapel; the spire was destroyed, together with the sculptural decoration of the tympanum, the arch over the portal, trumeau, the central column of the portal, almost all the other exterior sculpture with the exception of that in the voussoirs, and the arches over the portal. They also sacked the interior, destroying the furnishings and the stained glass windows of the nave and choir, but were unable to reach those in the apse.

The Baptistery of Saint Louis (long held in the chapel's treasury and used from at least as early as Louis XIII's time as the baptismal font for children of the French royal family) moved to the Louvre Museum.

The chapel houses the tombs of Bernardin Gigault (who died at Vincennes in 1694) and Louis Antoine, Duke of Enghien. The latter was executed in 1804 in the moat of the Château de Vincennes, near a grave which had already been prepared; in 1816, his remains were exhumed and placed in the chapel.

In the early 19th century, with the restoration of the monarchy, the chapel was again used periodically by the royal family. Louis Antoine, Duke of Enghien, who led a rebellion against Napoleon, was executed in 1804 in the moat of the Chateau and buried nearby. His remains were exhumed and in 1816 he was given a tomb and a small chapel inside the Sainte-Chapelle by King Louis XVIII.

In 1853 the Chapel was classified as an historical monument, and extensive restoration was carried out under the direction of Eugène Viollet-le-Duc.

=== Modern restoration (20th–21st centuries) ===
The chapel was damaged in 1999 by a powerful wind storm, which destroyed a group of windows in the nave. These windows themselves replaced windows destroyed by explosions in August 1944 during the liberation of Paris by the Allies. The restored windows were strengthened to resist future storms. Other restorations were carried out on the ceilings, and on the interior and exterior sculpture. These restorations were finished in 2009. A gargoyle fell from the facade in 2009, leading to another campaign of restoration.

== Plan and exterior ==
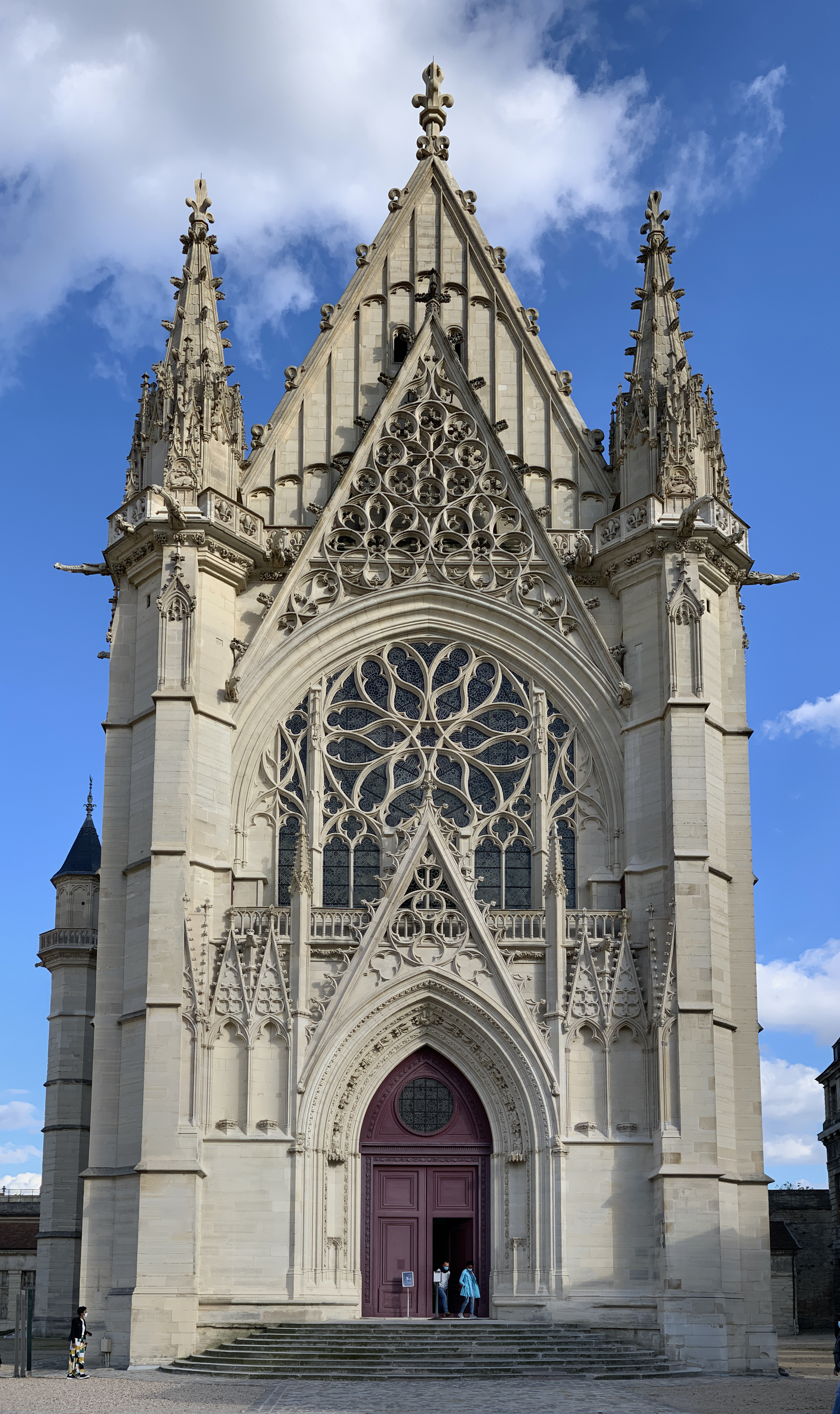
The west front

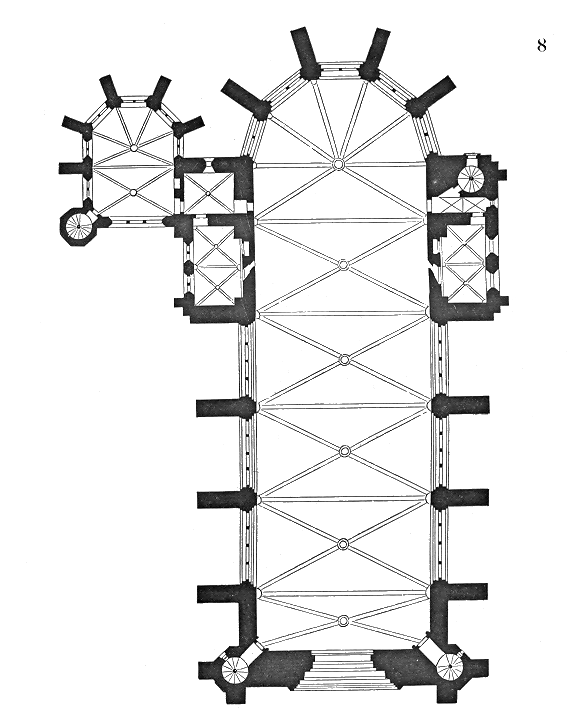
Plan of the chapel in the 1860s by Eugène Viollet-le-Duc

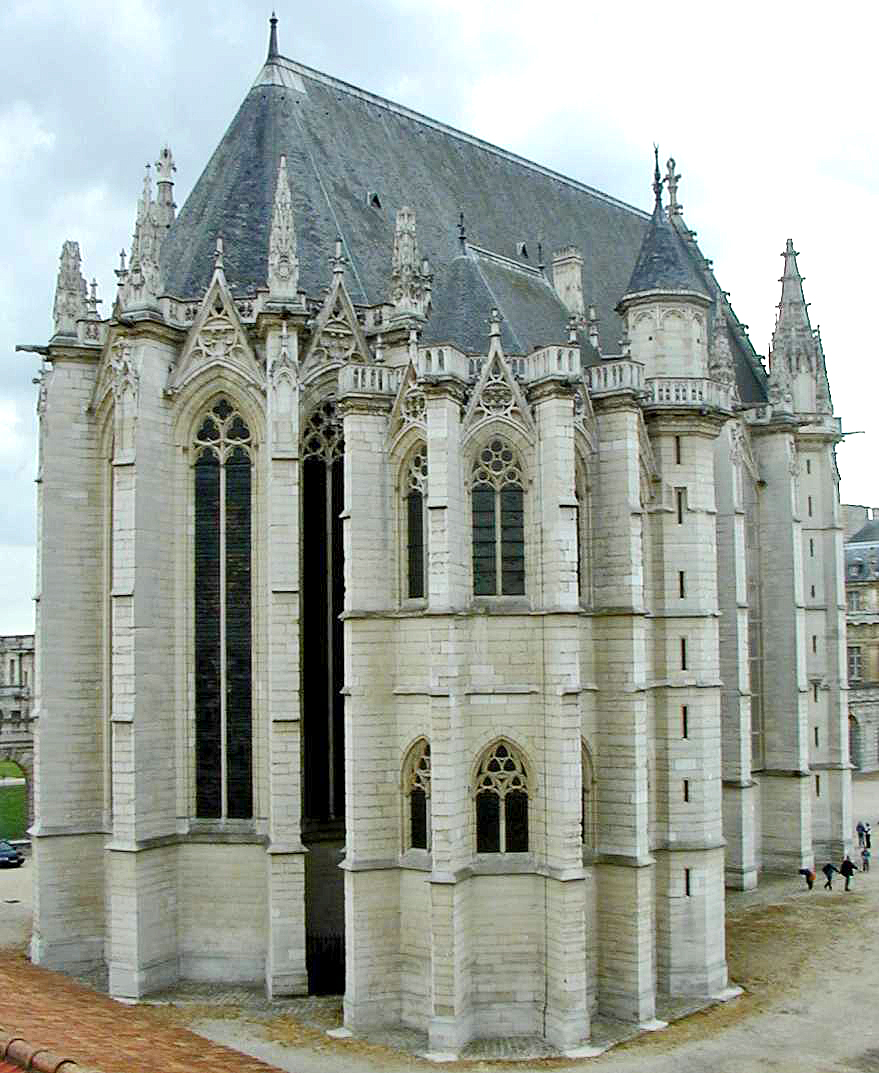
The apse and the sacristy, which contained the treasury on the upper floor

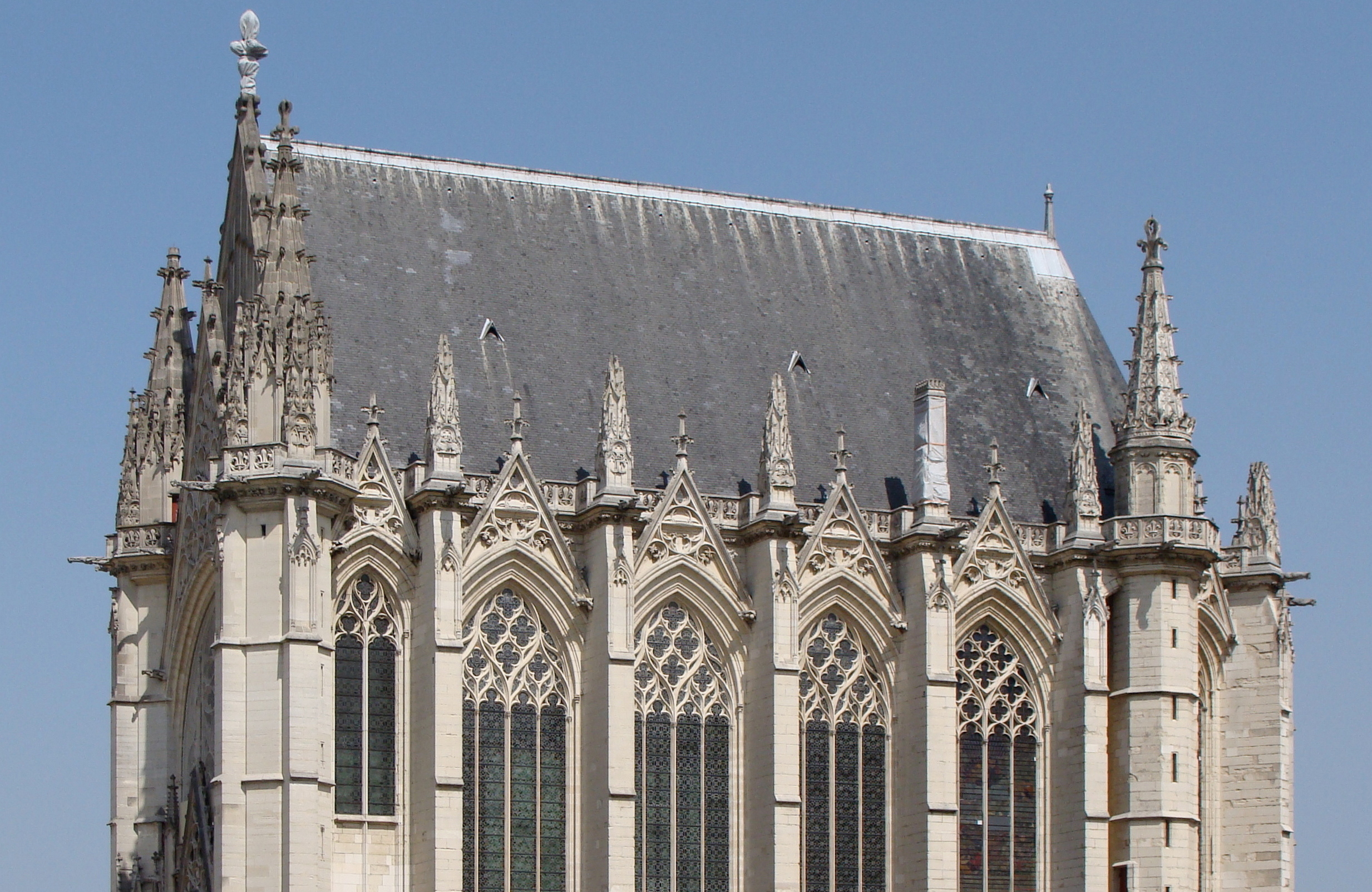
South side, with pinnacles on the buttresses

The plan of the chapel is modelled after that of the Sainte-Chapelle on the Île de la Cité in Paris, with the major difference being that the Paris chapel had two levels – the upper level for the King and his family, and the lower level for ordinary members of the court – while the Vincennes chapel has a single level.

The exterior plan is very simple; the bays are separated by strong buttresses, crowned by spires, and each bay is fill with stained glass up to the beginning of the roof, where it is topped by a gable, or pointed arch. The chapel originally had a flèche from the roof at the 4th traverse, similar to that of the Paris chapel. It was destroyed in 1793 during the French Revolution.

The sacristy is a separate two-storey structure attached to the chapel at the oratory of the King on the north side of the chapel. The upper floor contained the treasury of the structure, while the lower level held the clerical garments and regalia of the canons.

=== West front ===
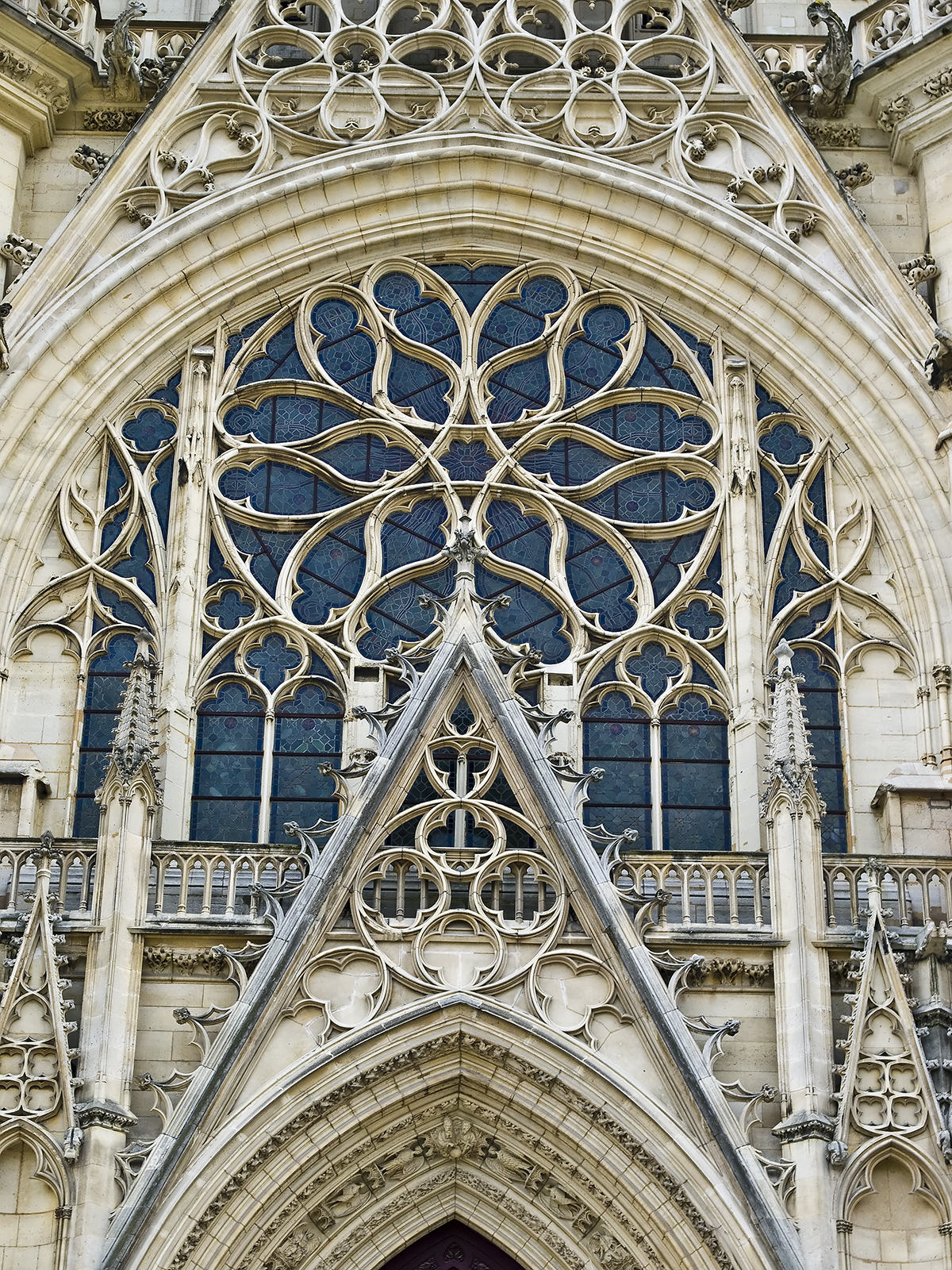
Detail of west front

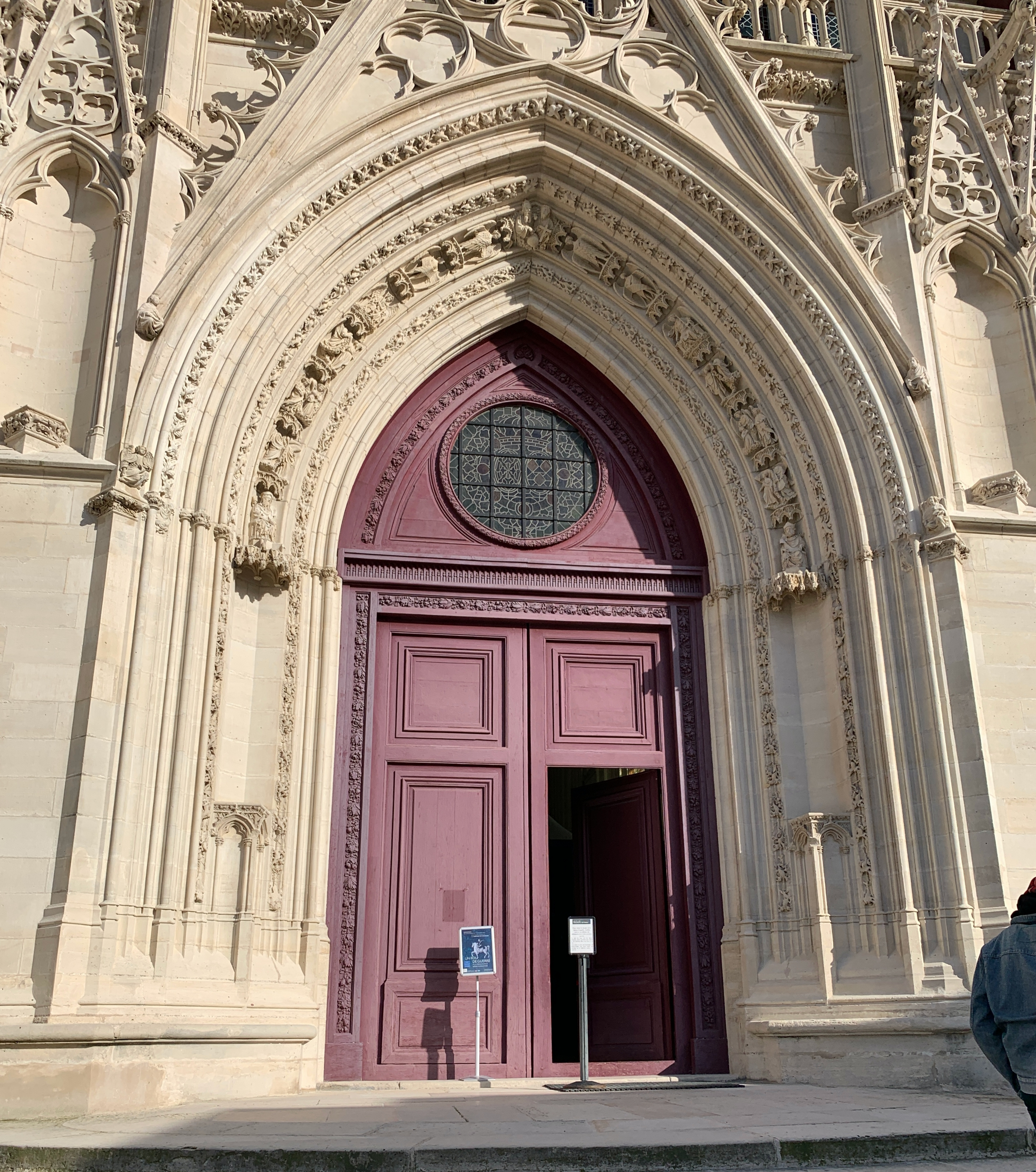
The west portal. Most of the sculpture was destroyed in 1793.

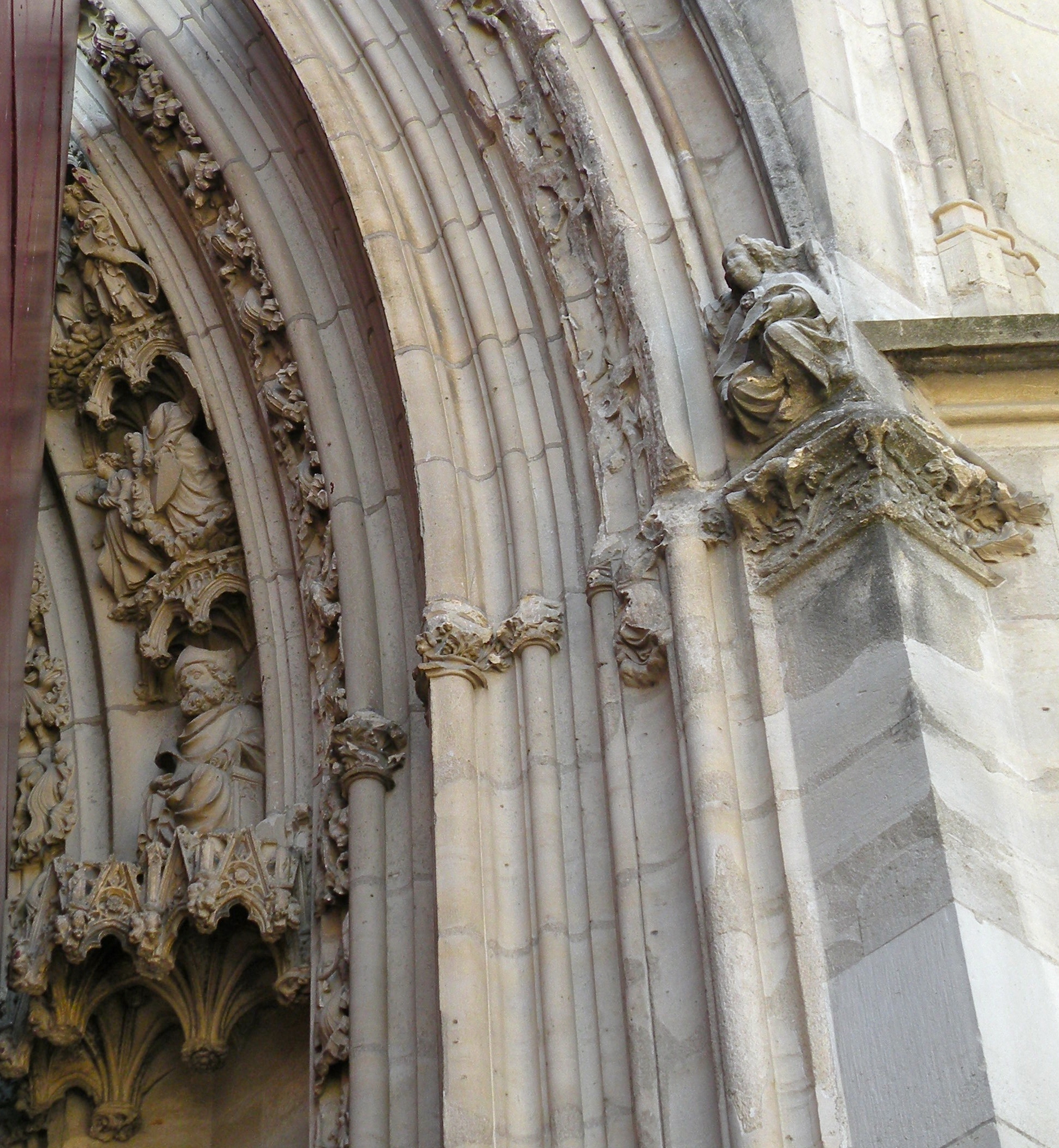
Surviving pre-1793 sculpture around the portal

The west front of the chapel, completed in 1552, was built later than the rest of the chapel. It is considered an important example of the more decorated Flamboyant Gothic style. The central element, the rose window, is framed by three very ornate pignons or arches, one below, one around, and one above the window, framing it. The west front was badly damaged by the sans-culottes in 1793; they smashed the sculpture that decorated the voussures, the arched vaults over the portal, as well as the sculpture on the trumeau, the column in the enter of the portal. The trumeau was originally decorated with a sculpture of the Virgin and Child.

== Interior ==
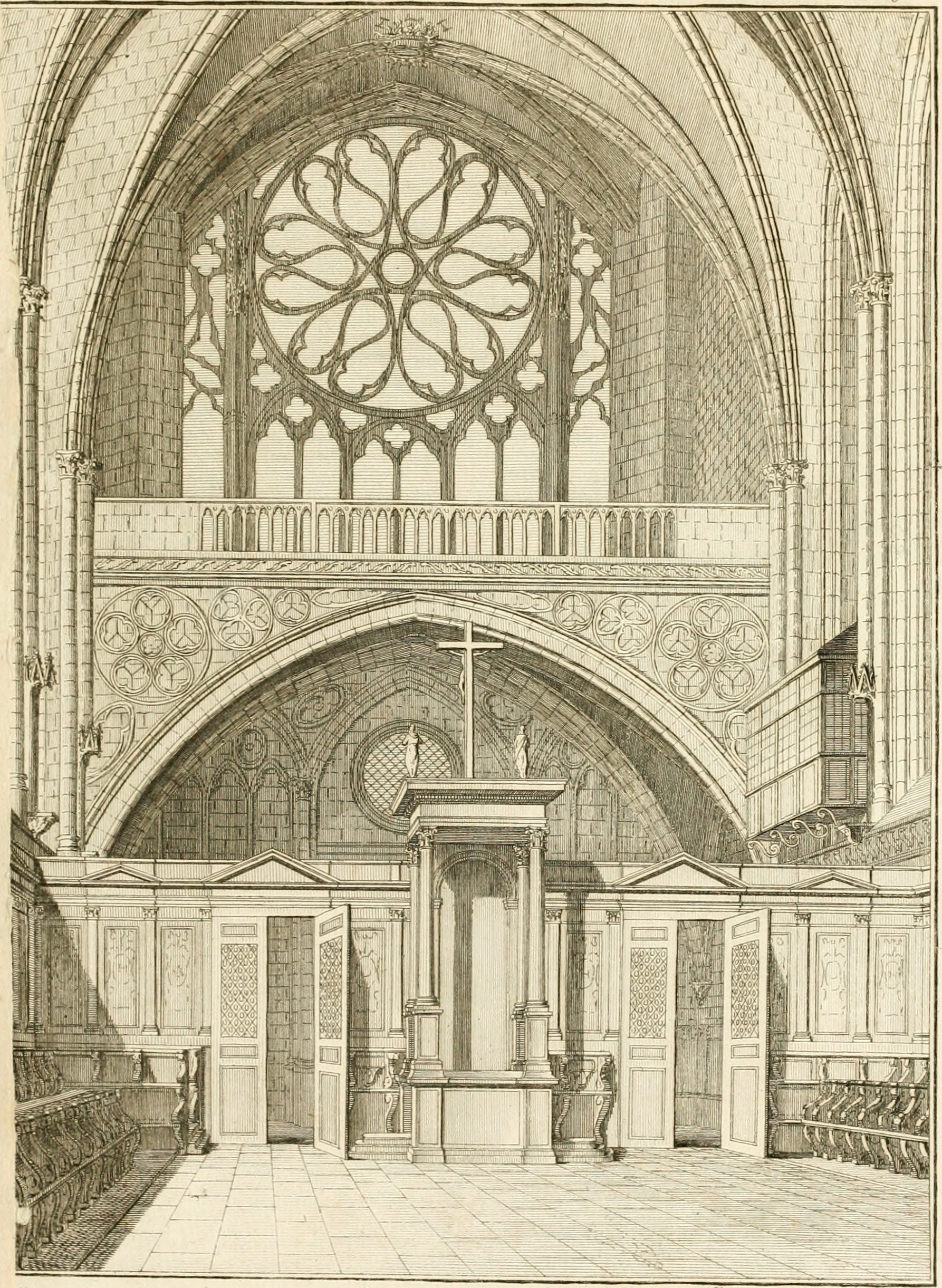
The carved stalls placed in the chapel by Henry II, destroyed in 1793

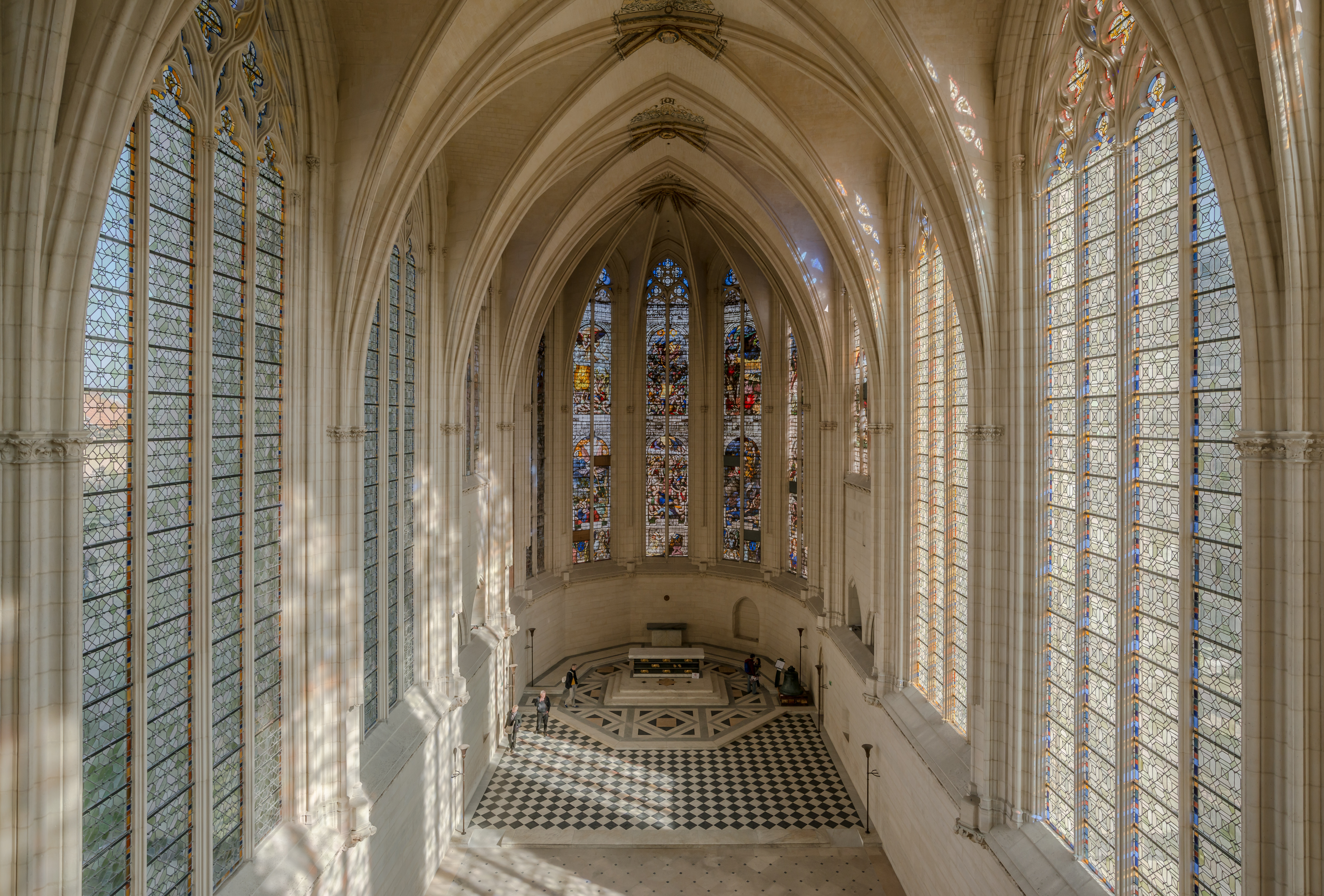
The interior of the chapel

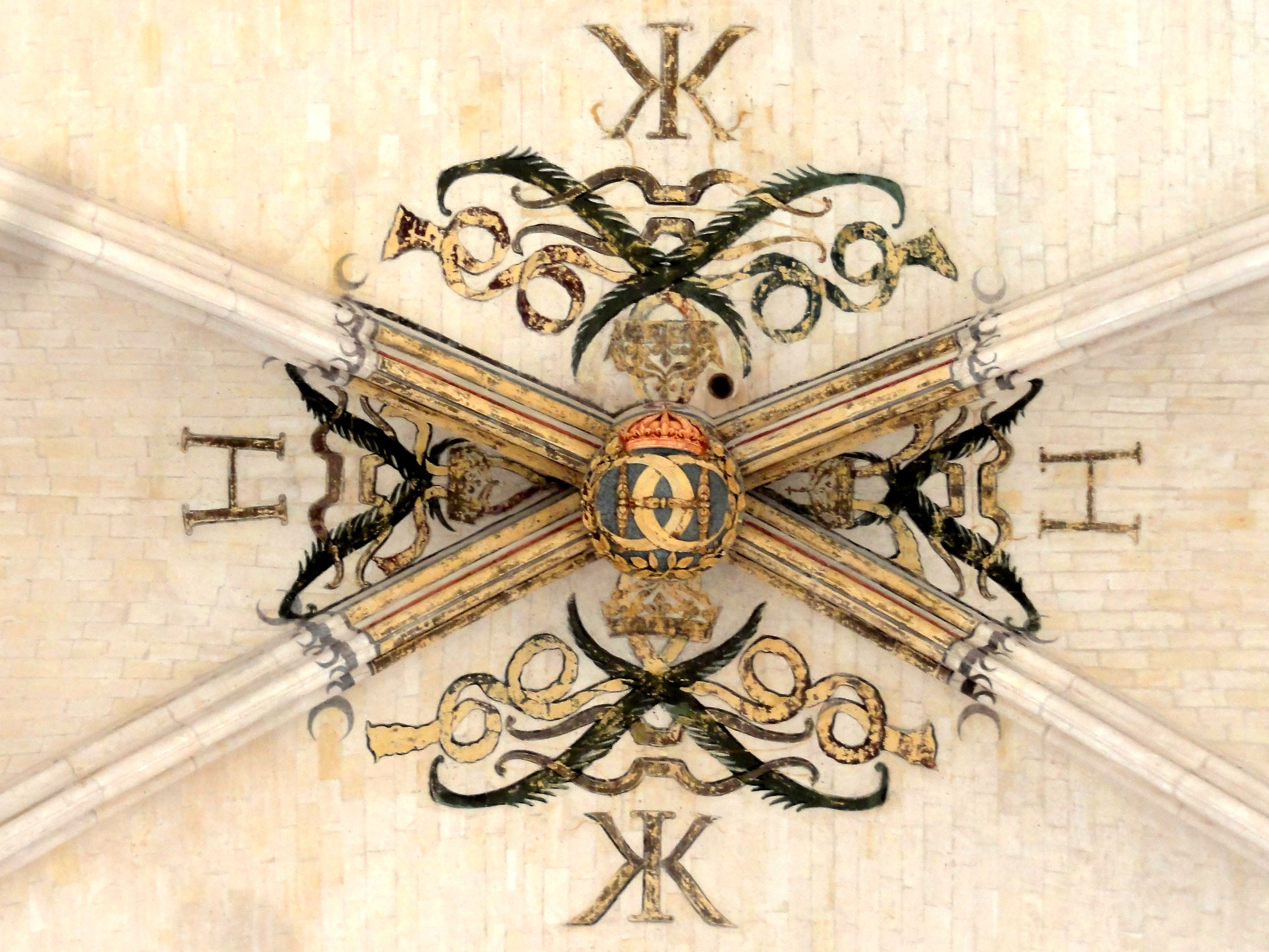
Keystone of a vault with initials of Henry II and Catherine de' Medici

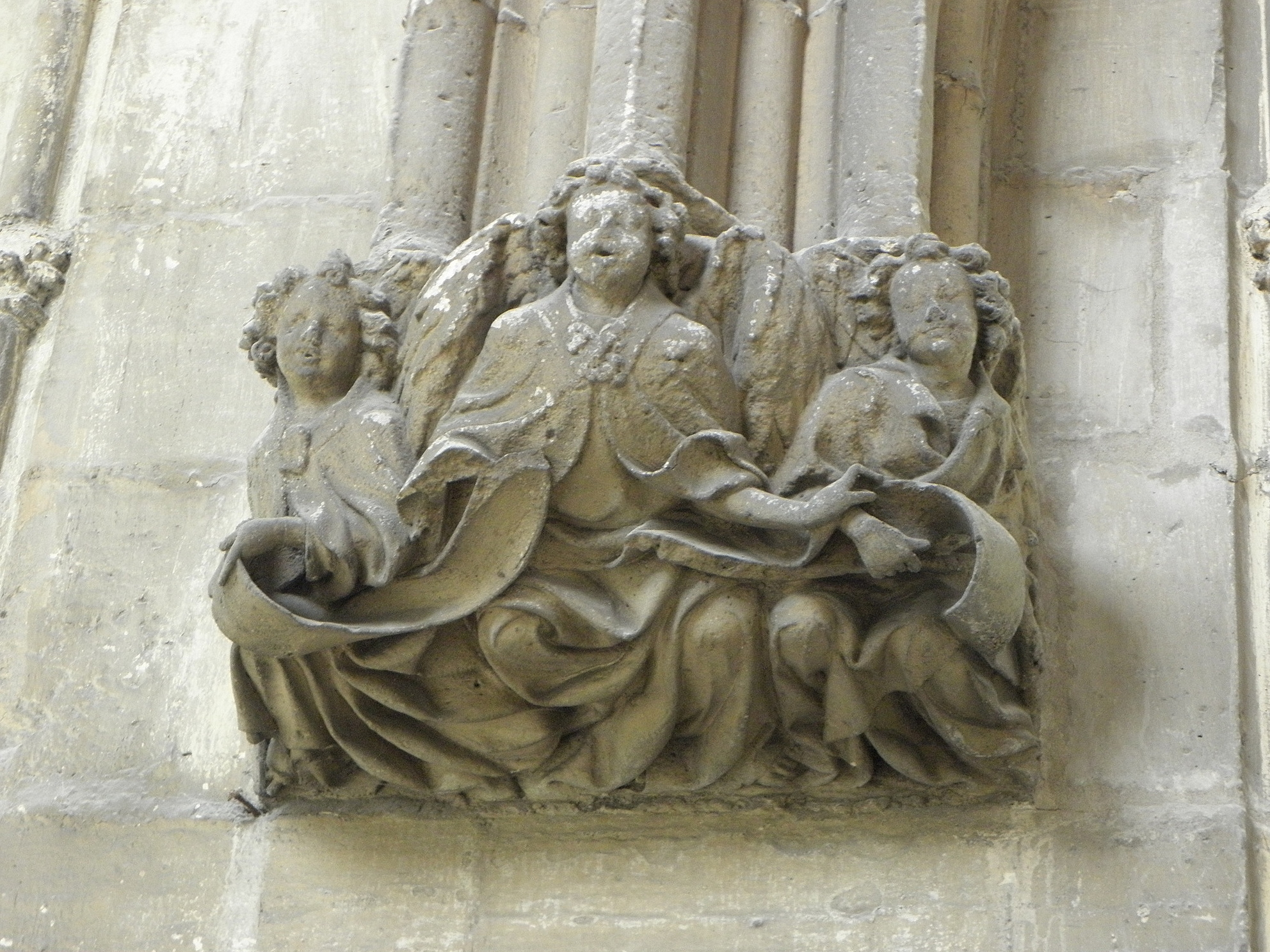
A corbel decorating the base of an arch

The interior has very little decoration; most of it was destroyed in 1793 during the French Revolution, and only traces remain. Between 1547 and 1549, Henry II commissioned the redecoration of the choir to serve as the meeting place of the Order of Saint Michael, which had been created by Louis XI in 1468. Parts of the chapel were set off with a carved wooden enclosure and 48 stalls for the knights of the order, which was headed by the King. Henry invited Italian and French artists and craftsmen, particularly those who had been engaged in the redecoration of the Palace of Fontainebleau, to do the work, directed by the royal architect Philibert Delorme. The woodwork was destroyed in 1793, but traces of the decoration can be seen on the ceiling vaults: the letters H and K, for Henry and Catherine de' Medici.

== Art and decoration ==
Most of the decoration was destroyed in 1793, but vestiges of sculpture and portions of the stained glass are still visible. Some of the decoration displays the particular emblem of Henry II, a moon. This referred to his mottos, "When it is full, it equals the sun", and "Until she completes the full circle." It also has been said to be a discreet reference to the King's mistress, Diane de Poitiers, Diana in mythology being the goddess of the Moon.

=== Stained glass ===
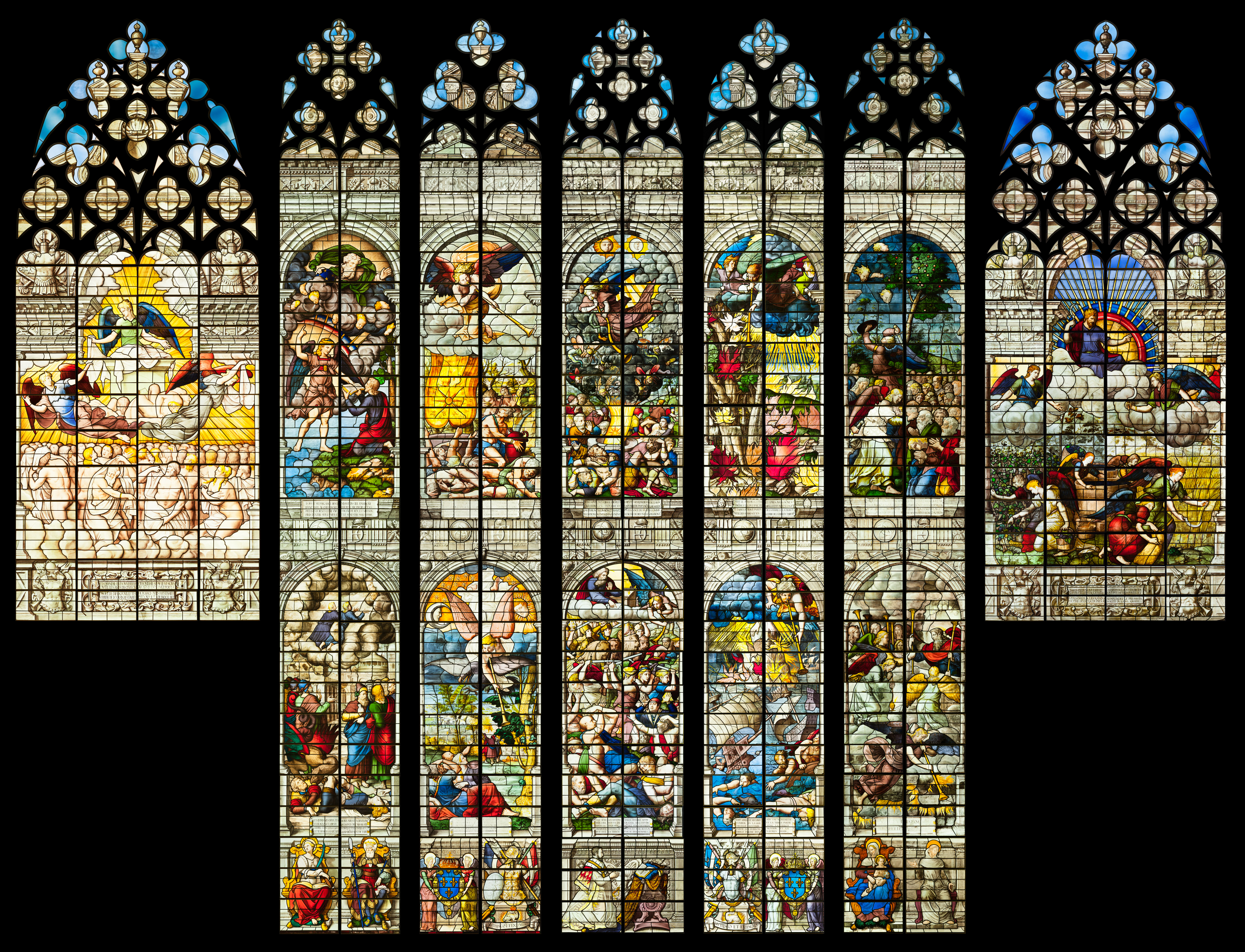
The Renaissance windows of the apse (1556–1559; triple-click images for full view)

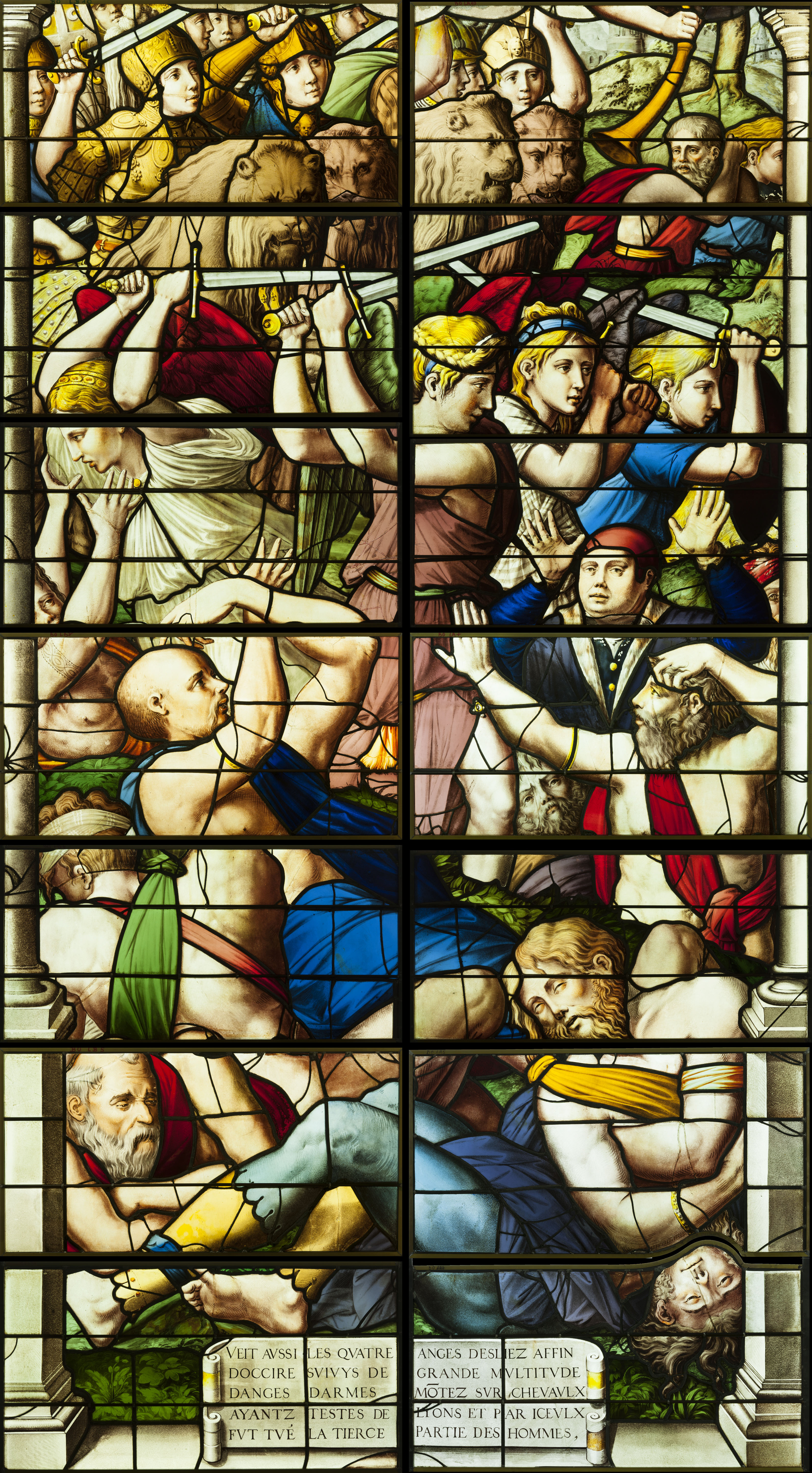
Detail of Bay 1: The Exterminating Angels

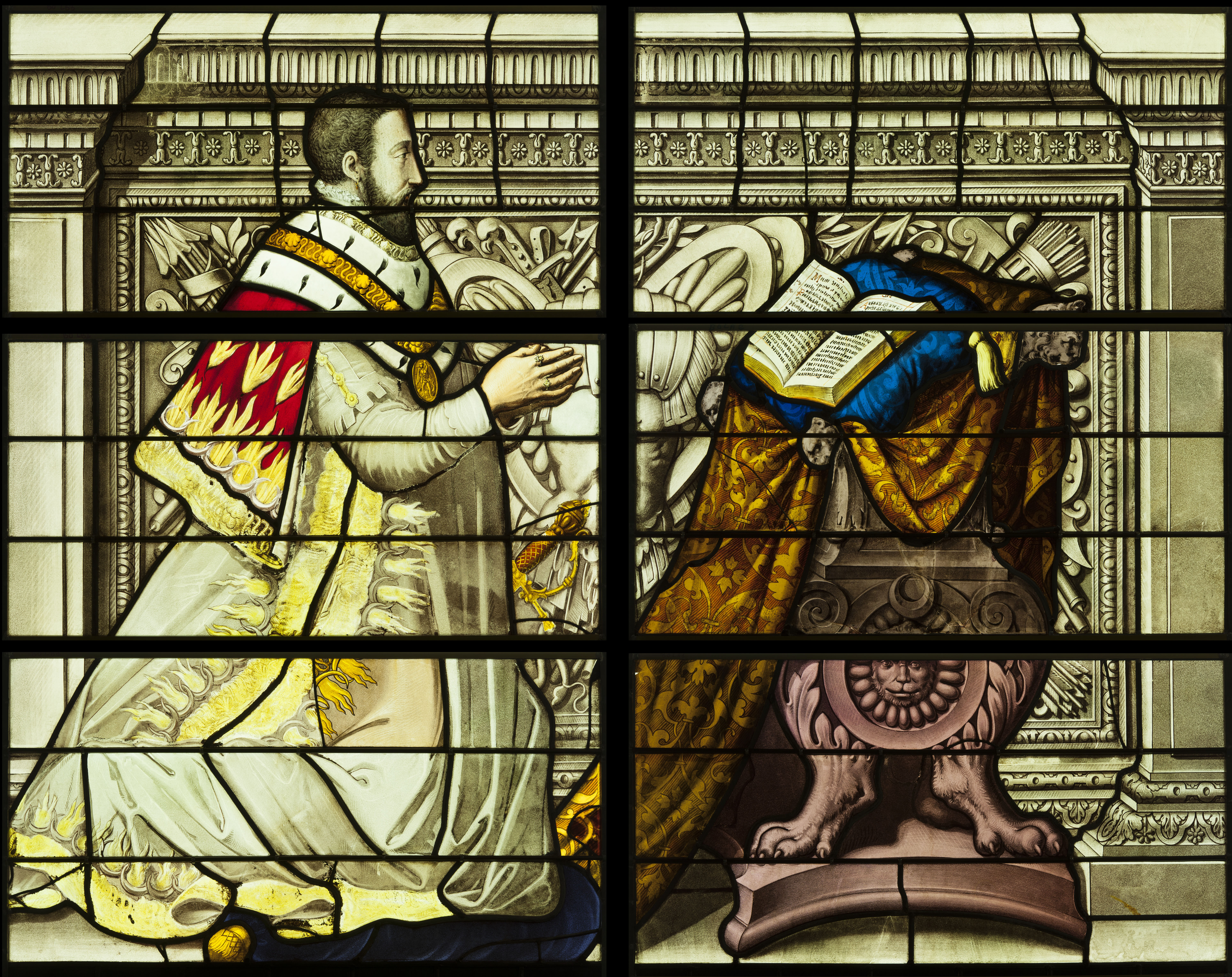
Henry II kneeling in prayer (19th-century recreation; central window, bottom)

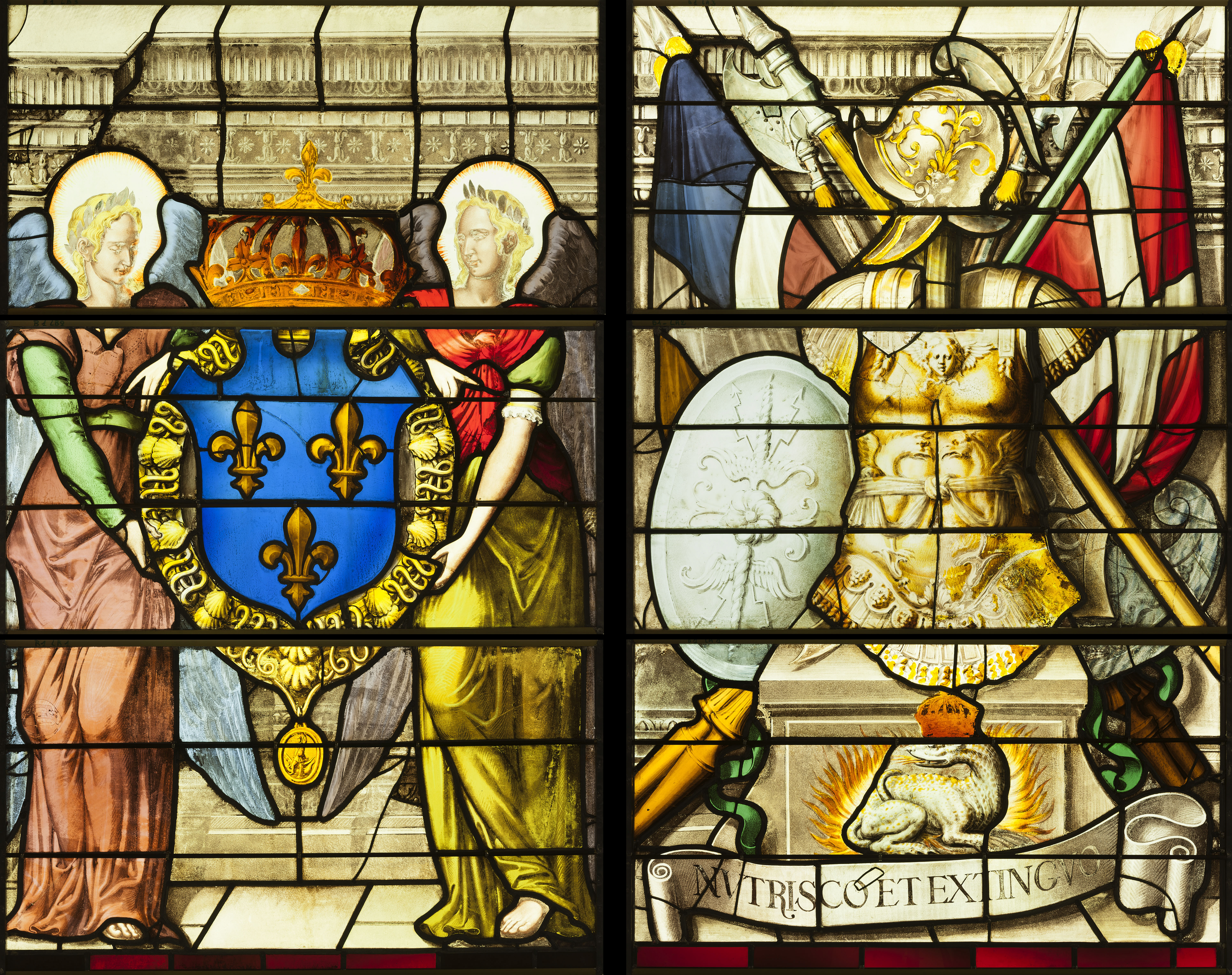
Detail of Bay 1: Two angels present the arms of France, and a trophy of arms

The surviving stained glass windows date from the Renaissance, and were installed in the chapel between 1551 and 1559. Almost all of the glass in the nave was destroyed in 1793, and is known today only from early illustrations. The nave windows were mostly made of white glass to allow in a maximum of light, so that worshippers could read their missals. The decoration consisted of crowns and royal insignia.

The apse windows at the east end were more fortunate, and most of the original glass survived. The windows illustrate the Apocalypse as described in the Book of Revelation. These 16th-century windows were restored twice in the 19th century, and certain figures, such as the figure of Henry II kneeling at the lower right, were recreated anew.

The stained glass of the Renaissance, unlike the early Gothic glass, was much thinner, and was made by painting the clear glass with a mixture of metal oxide colors and ground glass, which was then fired to fix it on the window. This allowed for much greater realism, and the use of subtle shading and perspective, so that stained glass increasingly resembled paintings. What was lost was the deep, rich coloring of Gothic stained glass windows.

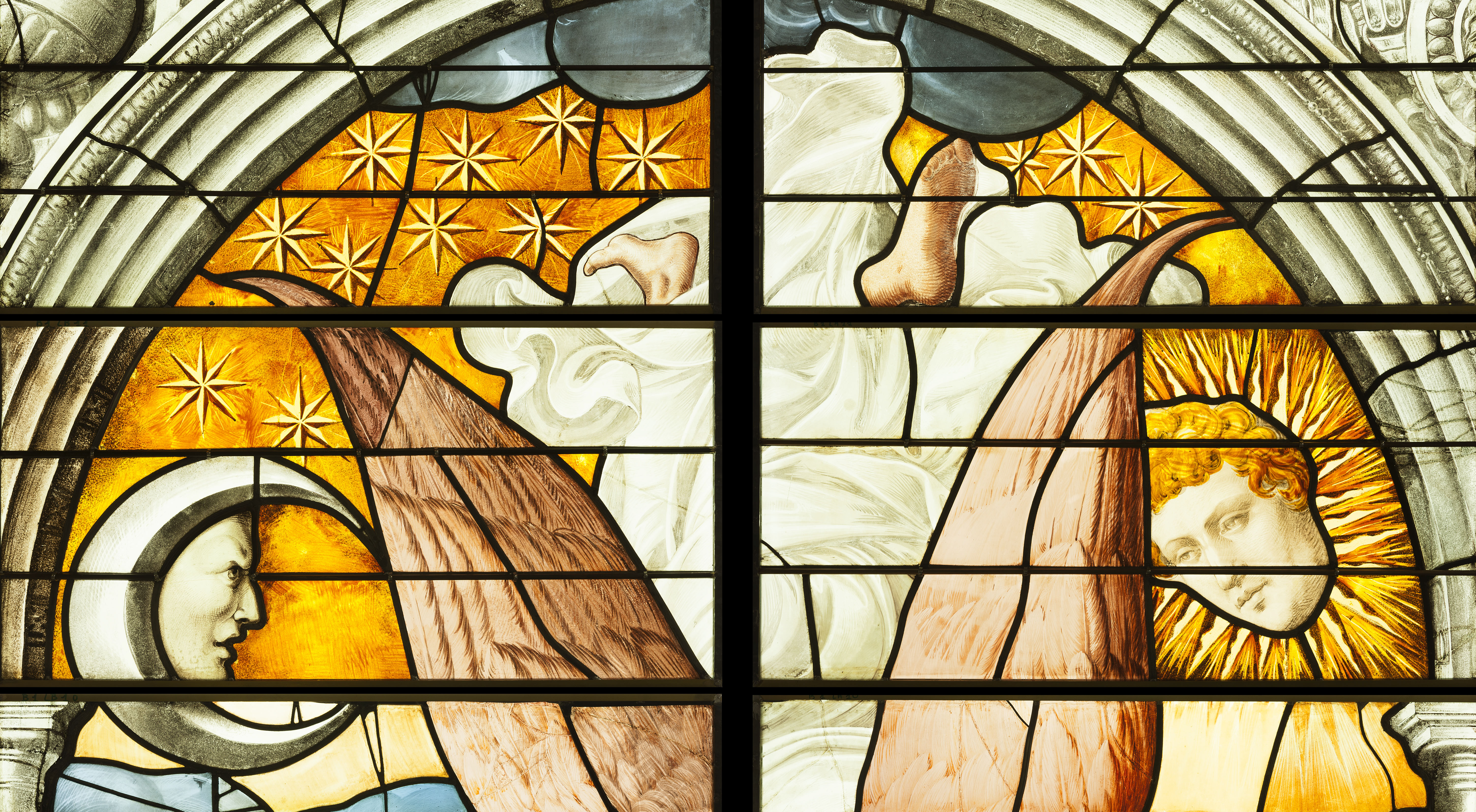
Apocalypse begins: The sun, moon and stars are obscured (Bay 1)

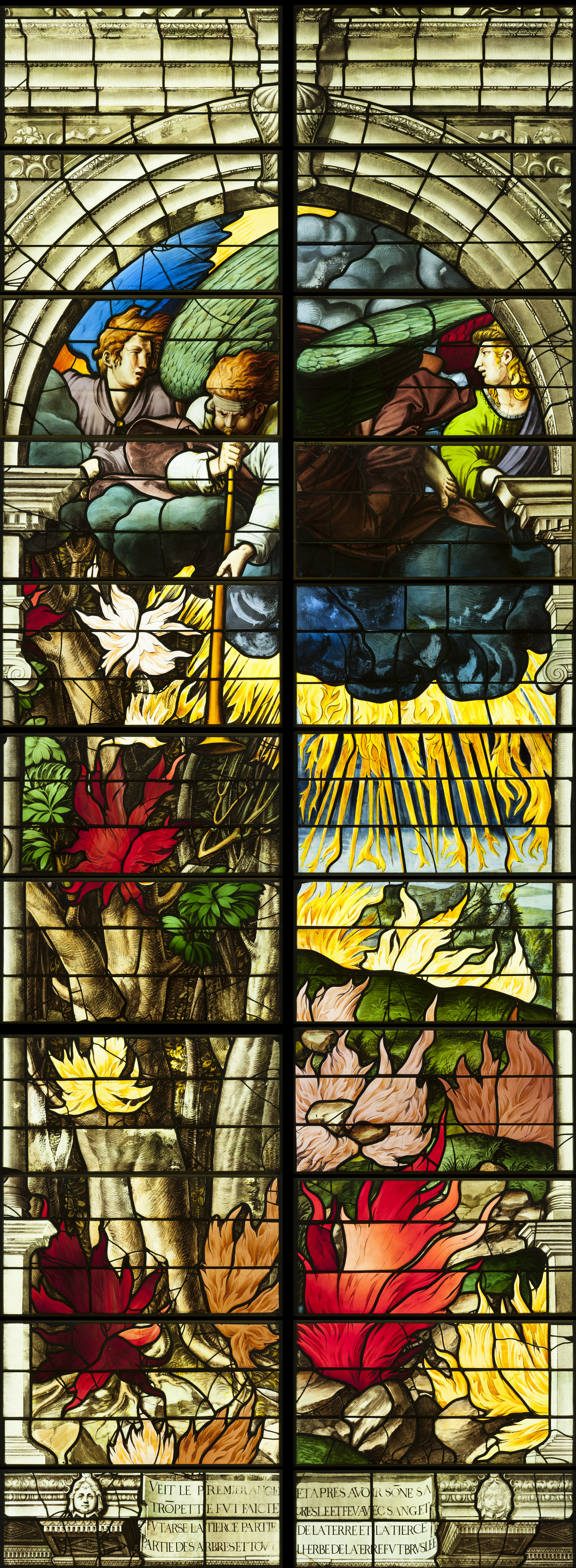
Fires of the Apocalypse destroy the trees and plants (Bay 2)

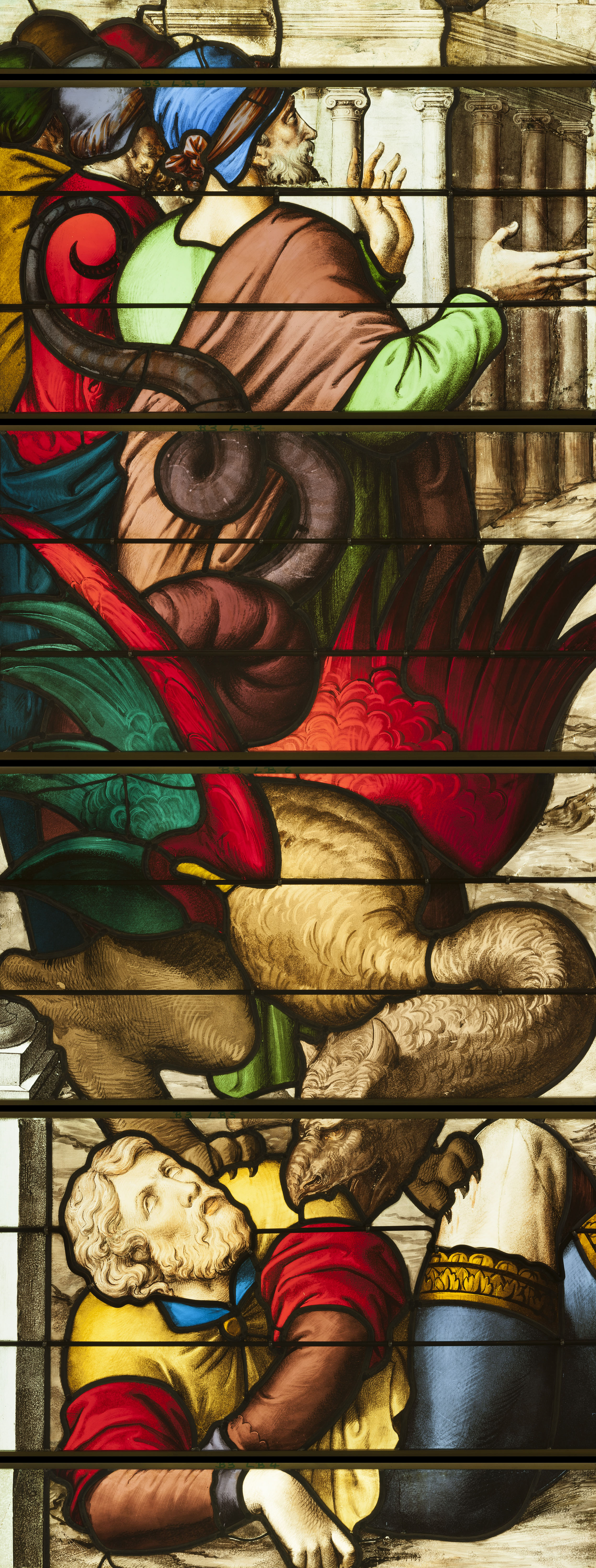
The two witnesses and the Beast (Bay 3)

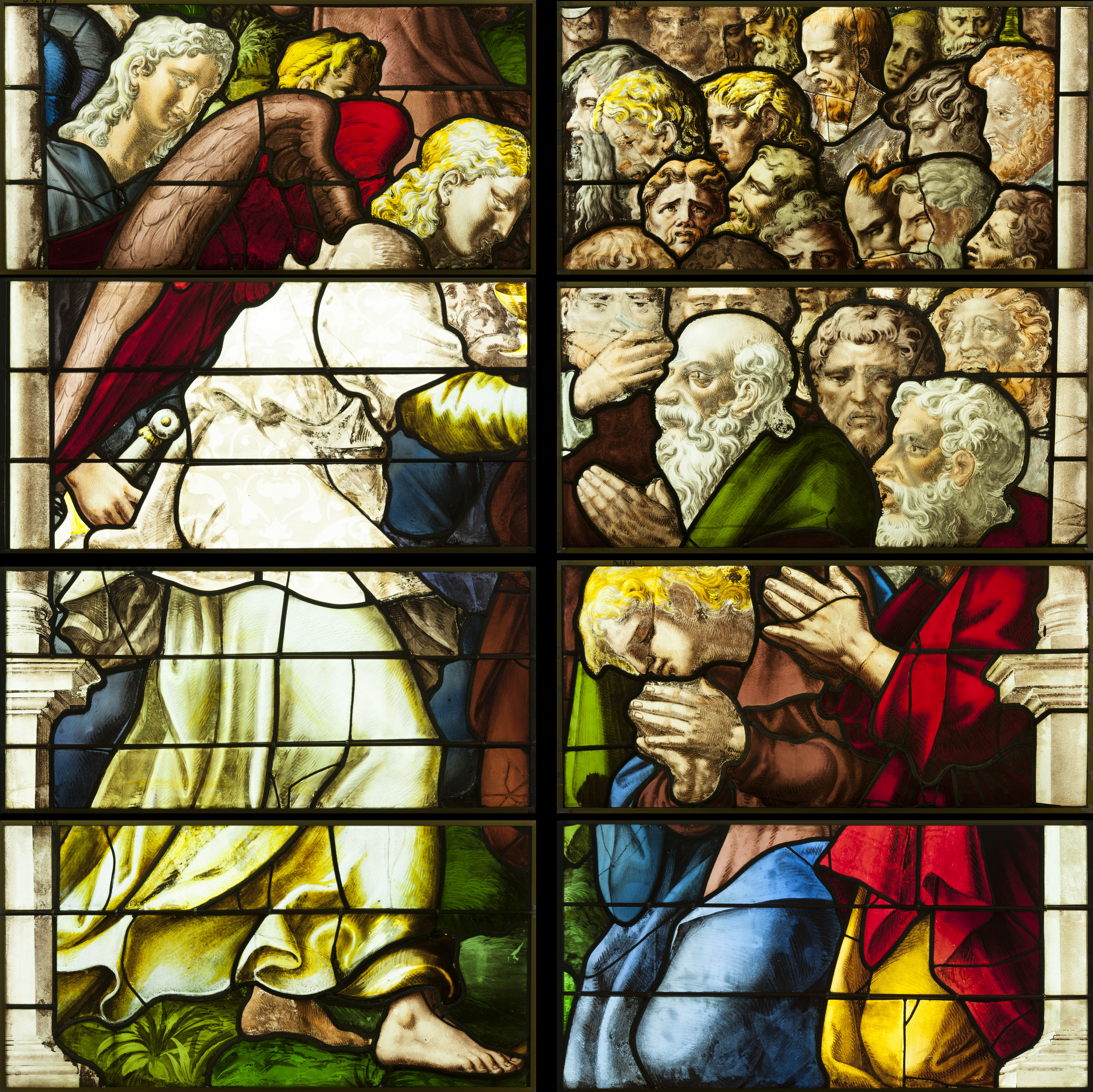
Angels annoit the servants of God (Bay 4)

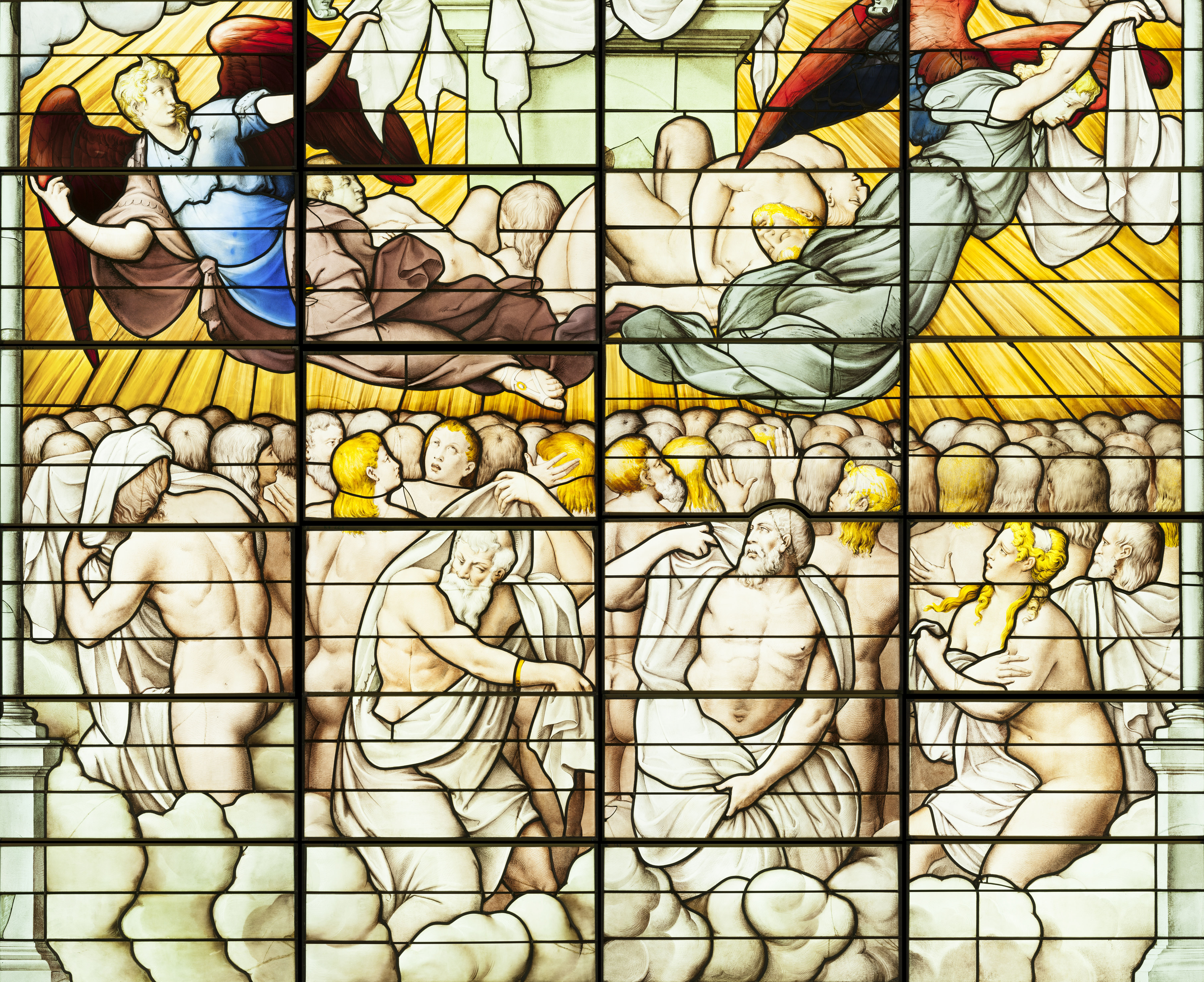
Angels distributing white robes to the saintly (Bay 5)

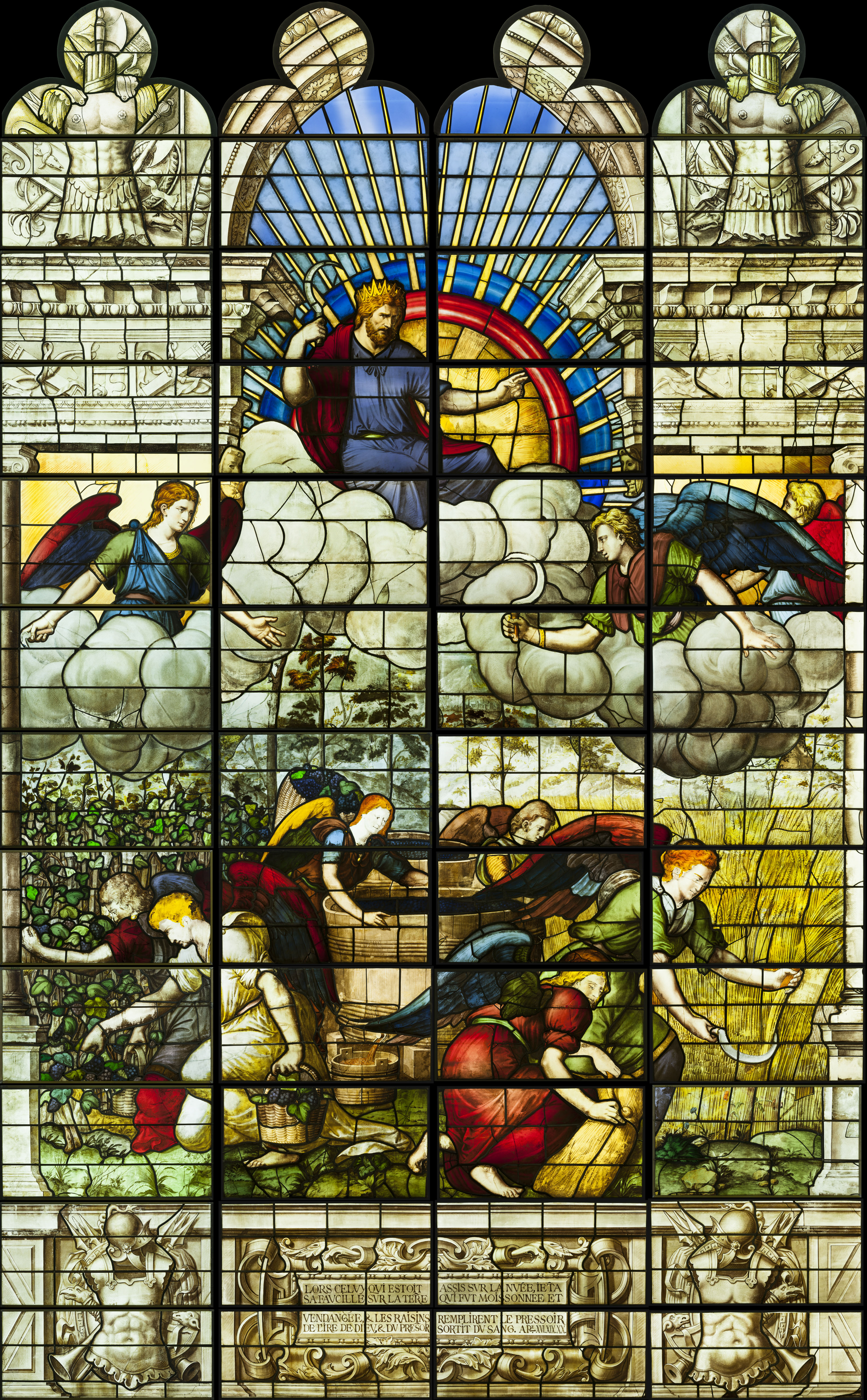
A harvest conducted by angels (Bay 6)

=== Sculpture ===
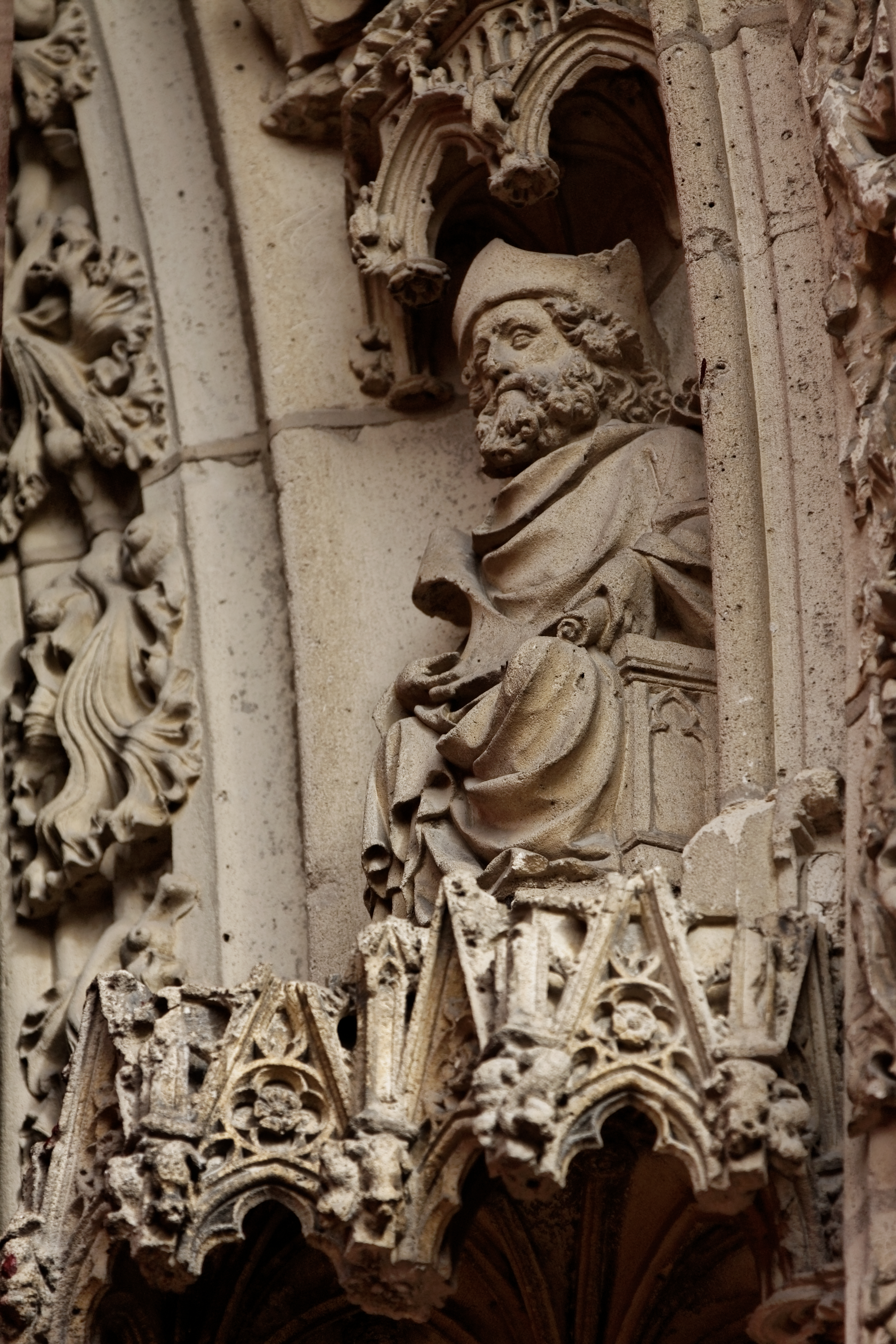
Voussure sculpture, west front portal

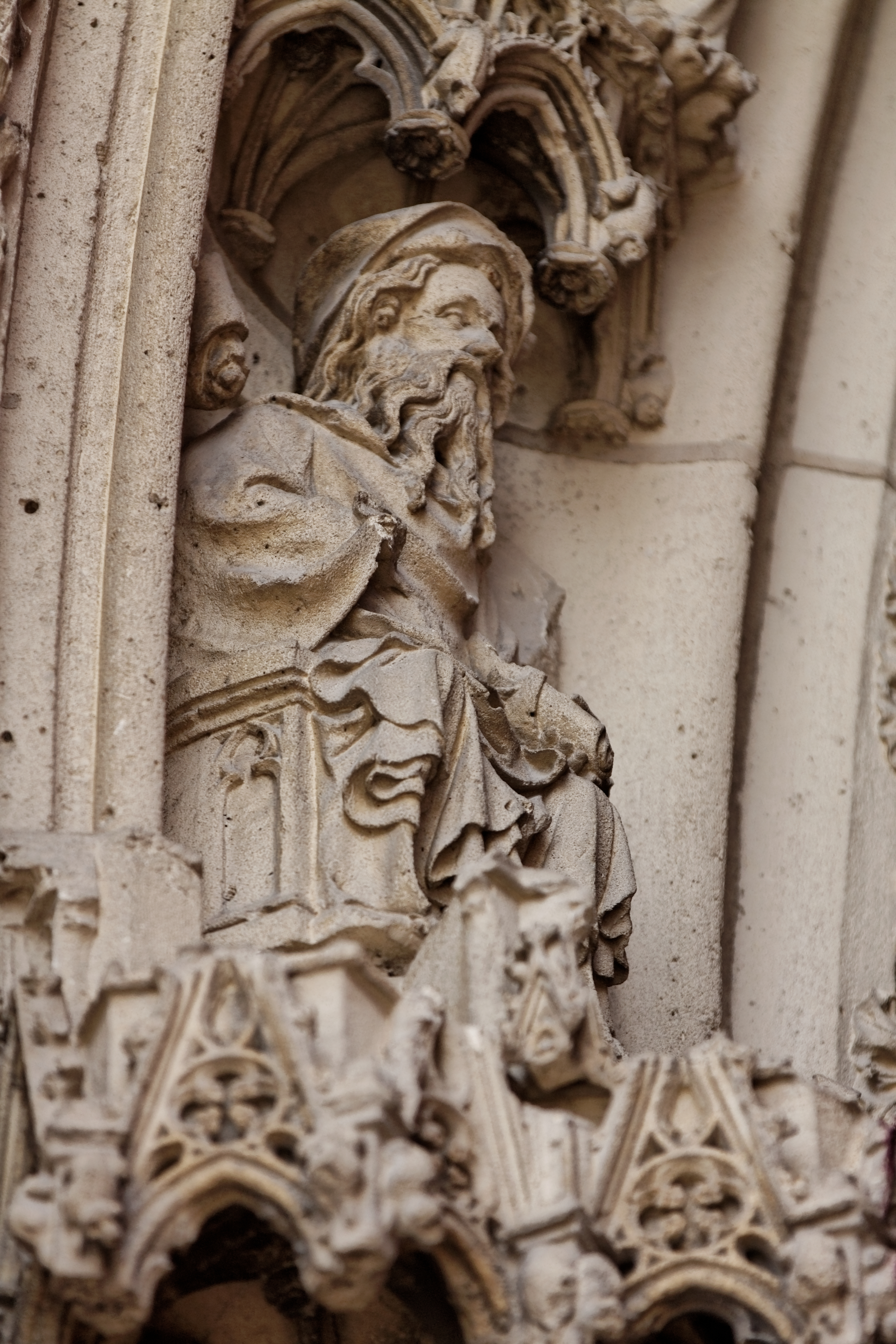
Voussure sculpture, west front portal

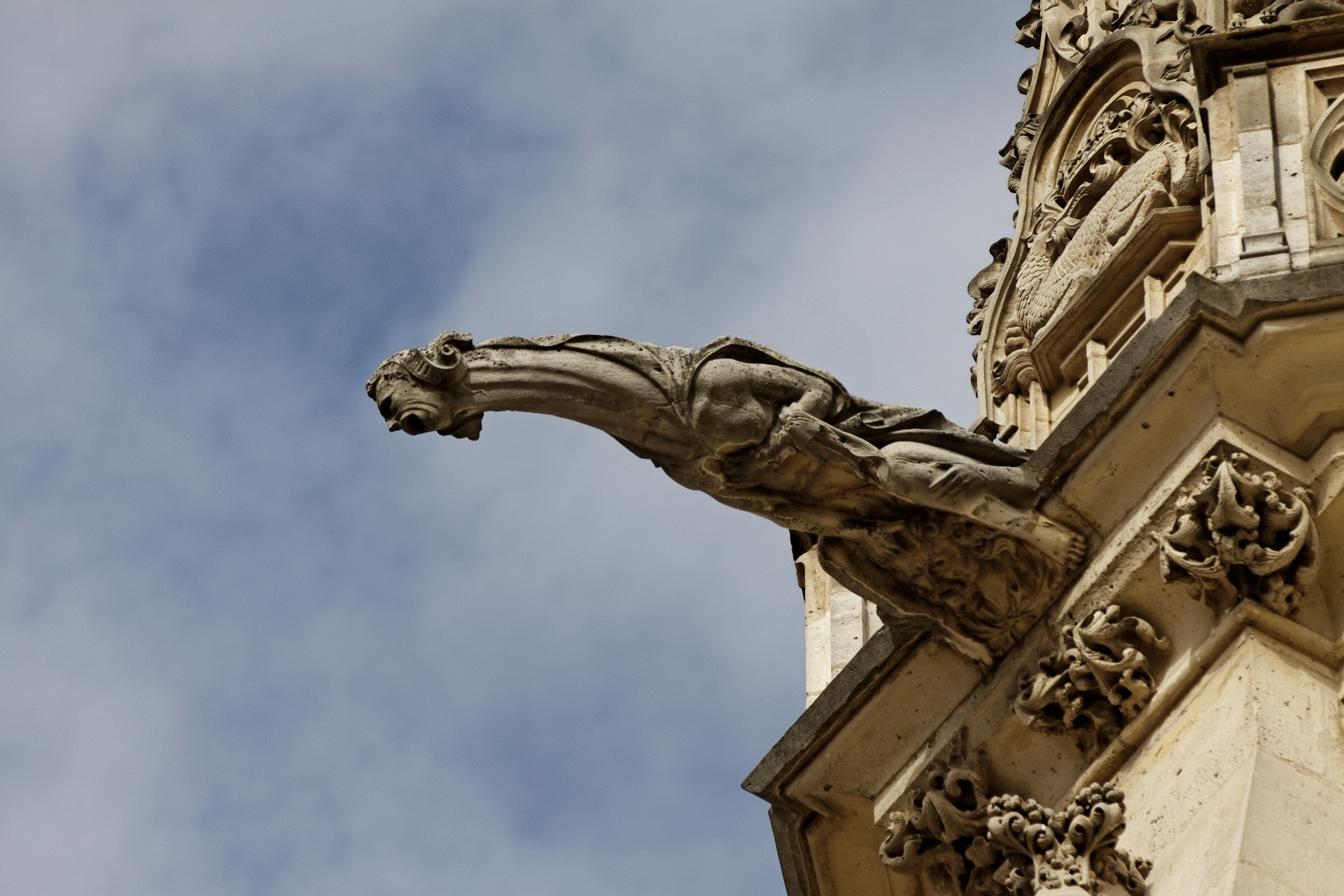
A gargoyle, serving as a rain spout

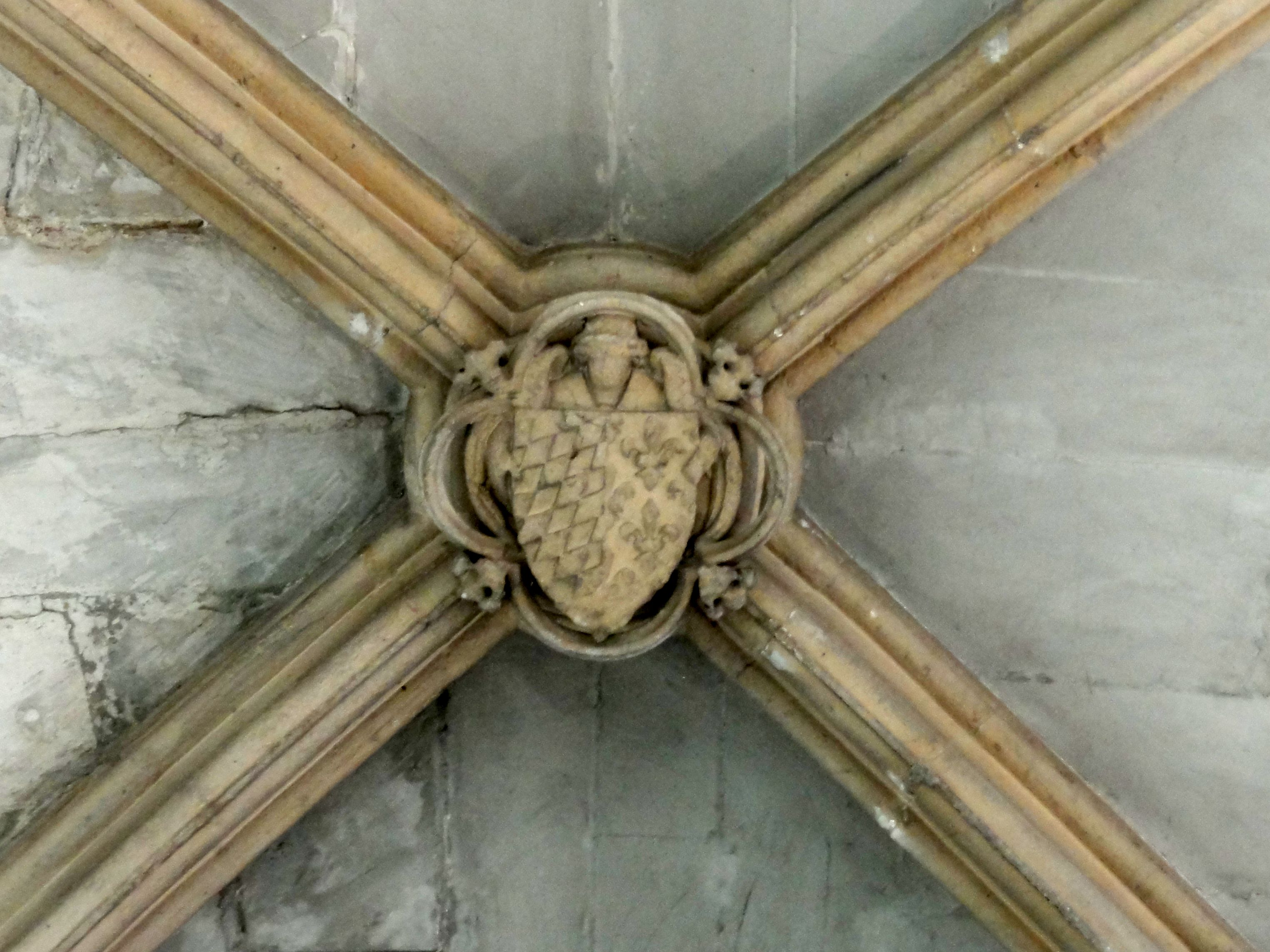
Keystone of the oratory of the King

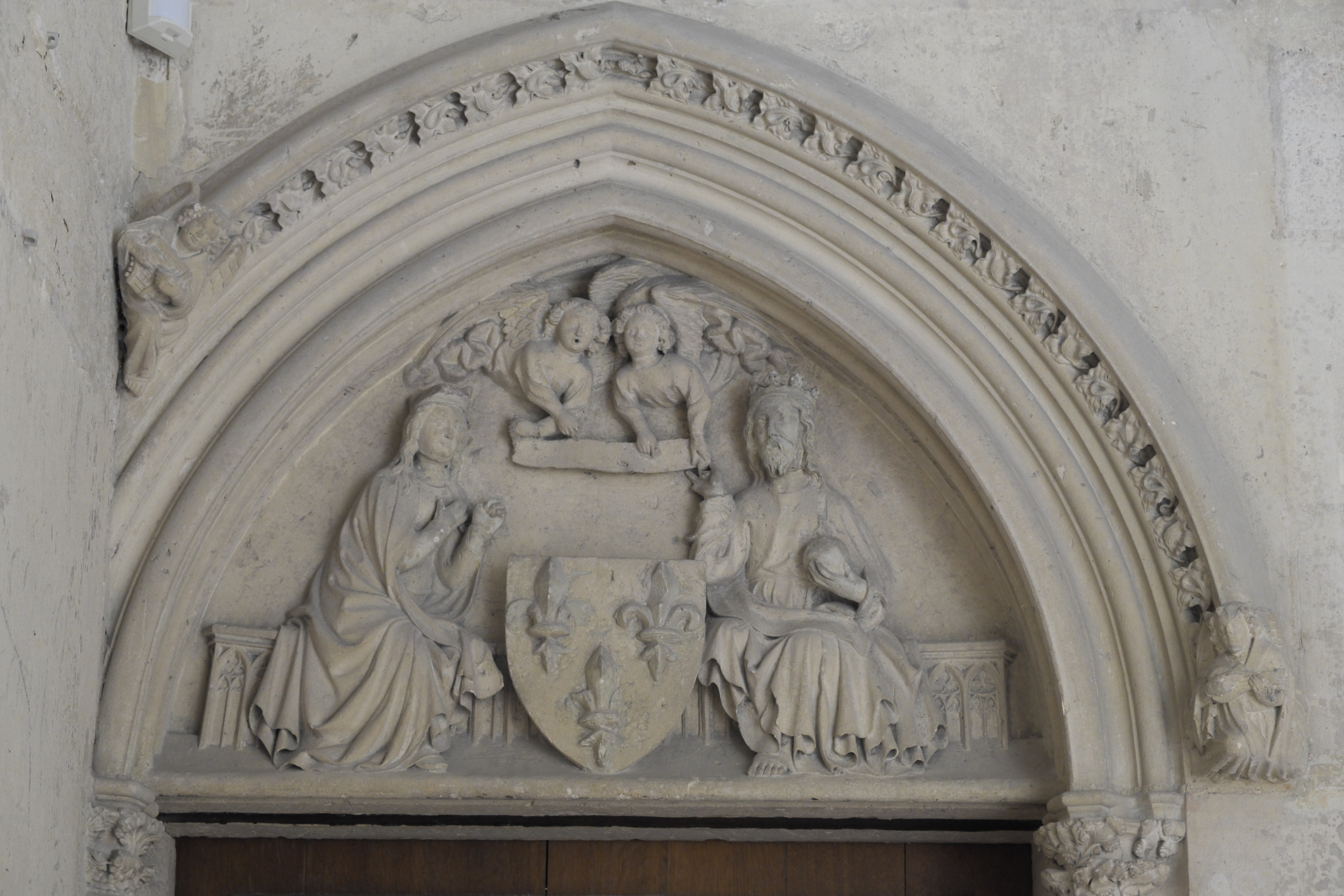
Tympanum of the oratory of the King

The majority of the original interior and exterior sculpture dated to the period between 1390 and 1410. This included the statues in the niches of the interior and exterior, and the sculpture in the vaults over the portals. Most of the sculpture of the chapel, exterior and interior, was smashed by the sans-culottes in 1793. However, a number of smaller and harder-to-reach works survived, particularly in the higher parts of the portals, and in the parts of the interior which supported the bases of ribs and arches. One notable survivor is the coat of arms and figures representing the Coronation of the Virgin, in the tympanum over the doorway to the sacristy.

A later notable surviving work, from the 15th century, is found at the top of the voussures over the west portal: a representation of the Virgin and Child. The keystones, where the ribs of the vaults in the interior come together, are also decorated with sculpture, mostly carvings of the royal coats of arms. The exterior sculpture also includes numerous gargoyles, which had the practical function of collecting rain water from the roof and spouting it far away from the chapel walls.

== Bibliography ==
- Brisac, Catherine (1994). Le Vitrail (in French). Paris: La Martinière. ISBN 2-73-242117-0.
- Chapelot, Jean (2003). Le château de Vincennes (in French). Paris: Editions du Patrimoine – Centre des monuments nationaux. ISBN 978-2-85822-676-4.
