= Bernardin Gigault de Bellefonds =

French military officer and courtier

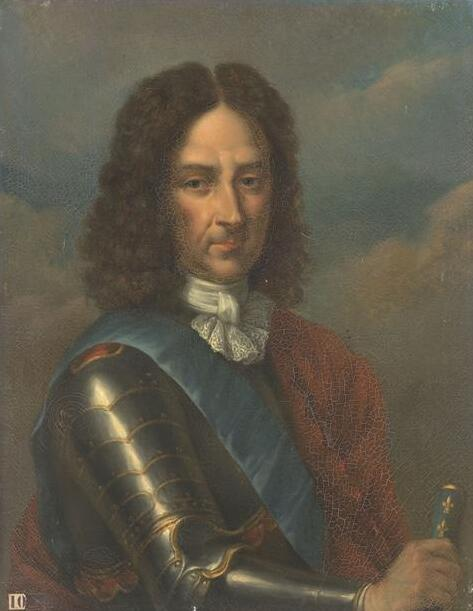
- Portrait of de Bellefonds by Joseph Albrier
- Born: 20 June 1630; Valognes, Normandy
- Died: 4 December 1694 (aged 64); Château de Vincennes
- Burial place: Sainte-Chapelle de Vincennes
- Relatives: Cousin to Marshal General de Villars (1653–1734) and Charles-Irénée de Saint-Pierre (1658–1743)
- Military career
- Allegiance: France
- Service years: 1649–1690
- Rank: Marshal of France
- Commands: Commander, Netherlands 1674; Catalonia 1684; Lower Normandy 1692
- Conflicts: Fronde 1648–1653; Valognes 1649 Cognac 1651; Franco-Spanish War 1635–1659; The Dunes 1658; War of Devolution 1667–1668; Franco-Dutch War 1672–1678; Capture of Navagne and Argenteau 1674; War of the Reunions 1683–1684; Siege of Girona 1684; Nine Years War 1688–1697; La Hogue 1692
- Awards: Order of the Holy Spirit 1688; Order of Saint Louis 1693
- Other work: Governor of Valognes (1643–1674); Head of the Maison du Roi November 1663 to April 1672; Head of household or Grand Ecuyer to La Dauphine, Maria Anna of Bavaria January 1680 to April 1690.

Bernardin Gigault, Marquis de Bellefonds (20 June 1630 – 4 December 1694) was a French military officer and courtier who was appointed Marshal of France in 1668 and held a number of senior positions in the personal household of King Louis XIV.

== Early life ==
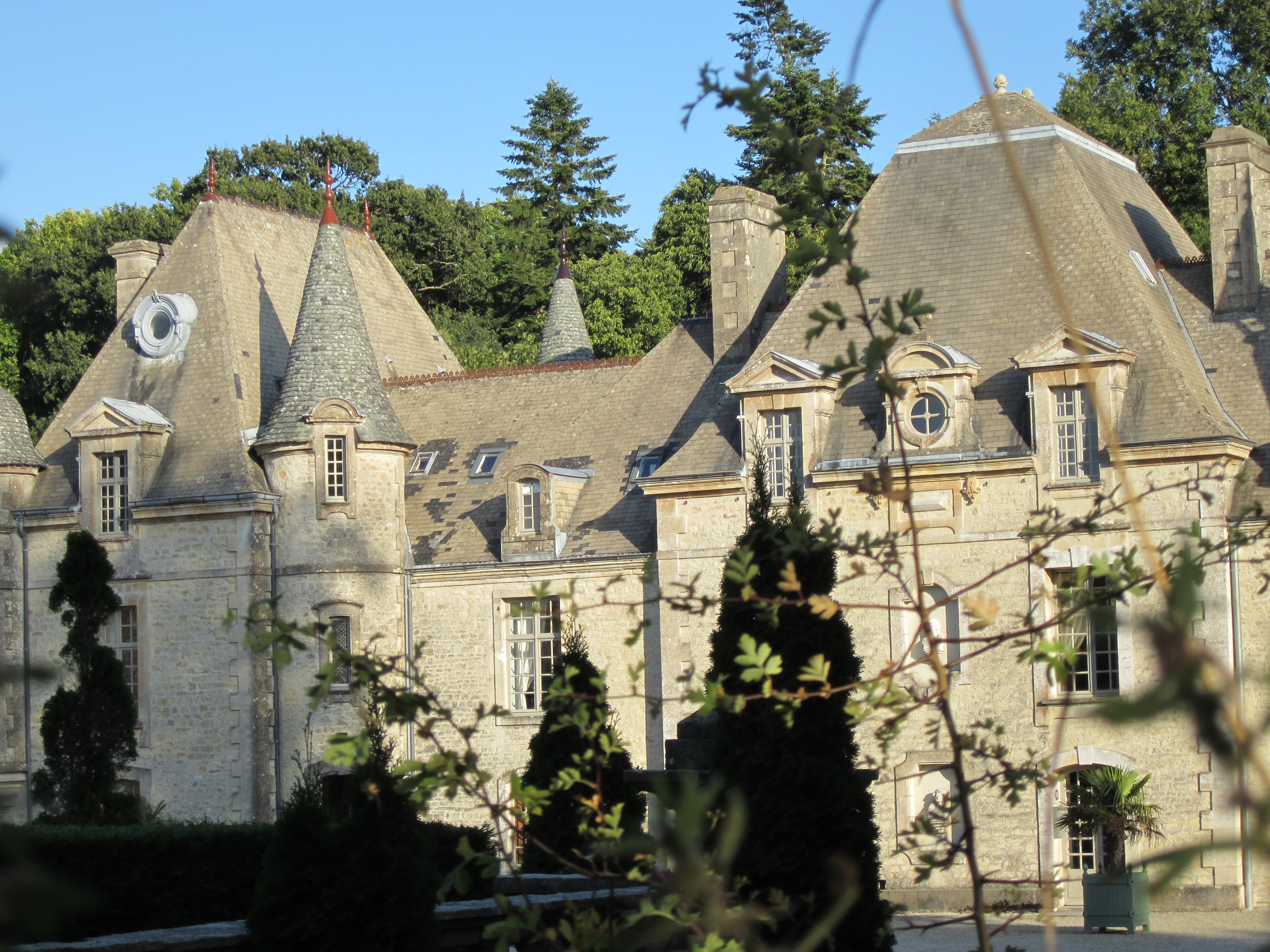
Château de Servigny, family estate of Bernardin Gigault de Bellefonds, outside Valognes, Manche, Normandy, France

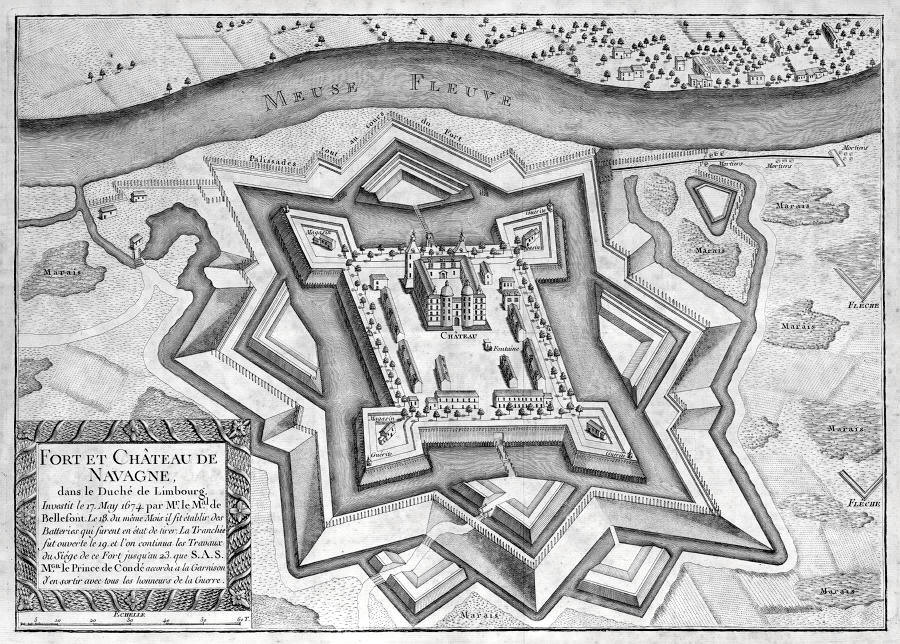
Fort Navagne, on the Meuse, taken and destroyed by Bellefonds in May 1674 but contrary to his orders; he was relieved of command

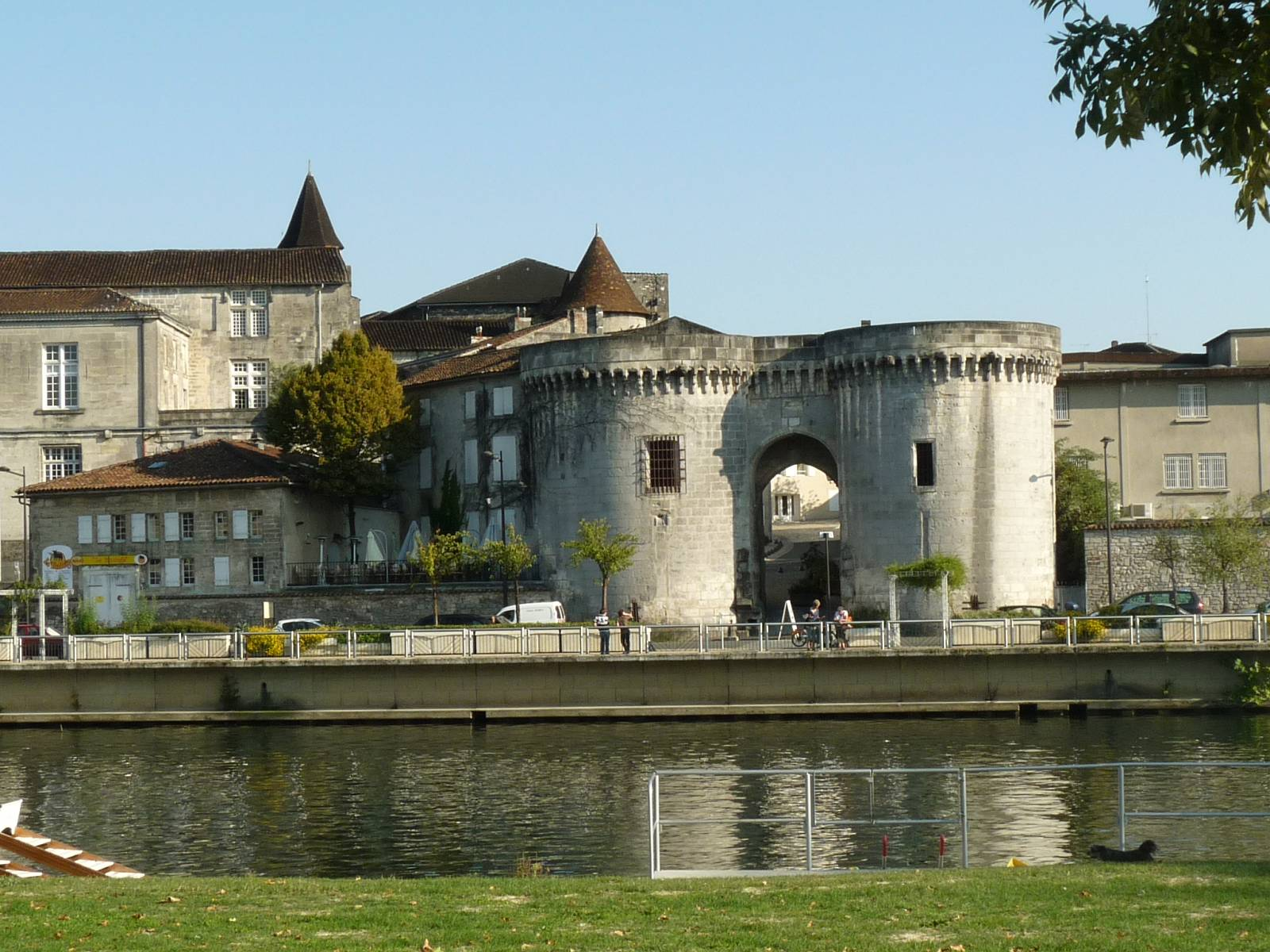
Porte St-Jacques, Cognac; Bellefonds defended it against Frondeurs under Condé in November 1651

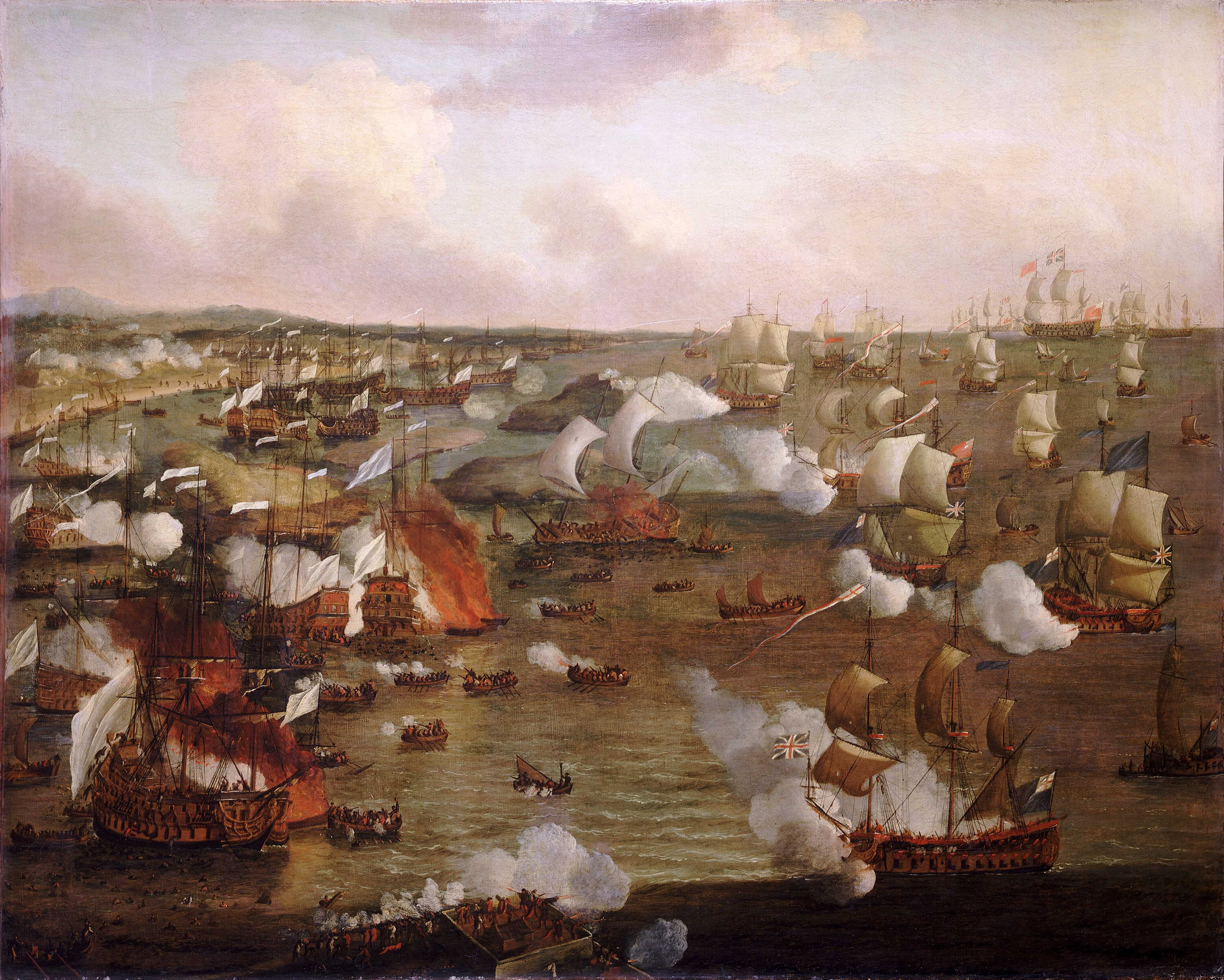
The Burning of French ships at La Hogue, June 1692; this was the final action of his military career

Coat of Arms of the Gigault de Bellefonds family; azure, chevron d'or and three silver lozenges

While the family came from Bellefonds, in the central French department of Nouvelle-Aquitaine, Bernadin's branch settled in Chef-du-Pont, near Valognes, in Normandy. His paternal grandfather Bernardin Gigault de Bellefonds (1580–1639) was Governor of Valognes and Caen; his grandmother Jeanne Suzanne aux-Épaules (?–1652) was the daughter of Henri-Robert-aux-Épaules, Lieutenant général du roi in Normandy.

Bernadin was the only child of Henri-Robert Gigault (?–1643), also Governor of Valognes and Caen, and his wife, Marie d'Avoynes (d. 1634), who brought the Servigny properties into the family. His father was one of eight and he had a wide circle of relatives in Normandy and Acquitaine.

== Private life ==
He married Madeleine Fouquet de Chalain (1639–1716) in 1655 and they had 9 children:

- Jean (1660–1668)
- Louis-Christophe, killed at Steenkerque in 1692
- Suzanne Louise Jeanne (d. 1698), married Charles-François Davy, Marquis d'Amfreville
- Thérèse-Marie (1667–1733), married Charles-Antoine, Marquis du Châtelet-Clefmont
- Jeanne-Susanne (1665–1698), married Charles-Antoine, Marquis du Châtelet-Clefmont
- Louise, married Jean-François du Fay, Marquis de Vergetot
- Bernardine-Thérèse (d. 1717)
- Françoise Bonne (1676–1693)
- Marie-Armande-Agnès
- Louis-Charles Bernadin (d. 1692), married Marie Olympe de La Porte. Bernardin's titles and estates were inherited by his grandson, Louis Charles Bernardin Gigault, Marquis de Bellefonds and de la Boulaye (1685-1710).

== Career ==
In the first half of the 17th century, France was divided internally and threatened externally; while it largely stayed out of the 1618–1648 Thirty Years' War, support for the Dutch Republic in its war of independence from Spain eventually led to the 1635–1659 Franco-Spanish War. At home, the French Wars of Religion that had ended with the 1590 Edict of Nantes flared up again in a series of domestic Huguenot rebellions in the 1620s.

The accession of the five-year old Louis XIV in 1643 caused a power struggle between his regents, headed by his mother, Anne of Austria and Cardinal Mazarin, opposed by regional magnates like Condé. This resulted in the 1648–1653 civil war known as the Fronde; Bellefonds became Governor of Valognes after his father's death in 1643 and in 1649 held it against rebel troops or Frondeurs. Similarly, in November 1651 he defended Cognac in Nouvelle-Aquitaine when besieged by Frondeurs under Condé, until it was relieved by the Comte d'Harcourt in early December.

In the latter stages of the Franco-Spanish war, he served in Catalonia and Flanders, including the decisive Battle of the Dunes in June 1658, which led to the 1659 Treaty of the Pyrenees and he was promoted Lieutenant-General in 1659. He was also employed in maritime operations, acting as deputy to the duc de Guise in his failed attempt to capture Naples in 1654 and in 1666 was sent to the Dutch Republic to discuss joint fleet operations against England.

In 1663, he was appointed head of the Maison du Roi or the King's household; given its proximity to Louis XIV, this was a position of great importance, held by an individual of proven loyalty. In the 1667–1668 War of Devolution, France quickly over-ran Franche-Comté and much of the Spanish Netherlands; after the capture of Lille in 1667, Turenne detached a cavalry force under Bellefonds and de Créquy to cut off the Spanish retreat. They inflicted nearly 2,000 casualties, with Louis looking on; in 1668, Bellefonds, de Créquy and Humières were all created Marshals of France.

However, the Dutch preferred a weak Spain as a neighbour in the Spanish Netherlands, to a strong and ambitious France; with England and Sweden, they formed the Triple Alliance obliging Louis to return most of his gains in the 1668 Treaty of Aix-la-Chapelle. Angered by what he viewed as ingratitude for previous French support against Spain, Louis made preparations to invade the Netherlands.

In April 1672, Turenne was appointed general en chef or senior commander of French forces in the Netherlands; this caused problems, as the convention was Marshalls did not serve under other Marshalls. Bellefonds, Humières and de Créquy refused to serve under Turenne, arguing that to do so would diminish their personal prestige and the position of Marshal; all three were banished to their estates, while Bellefonds also lost his position as head of the Maison du Roi.

When the Franco-Dutch War began in May 1672, the French over-ran much of the Dutch Republic and initially seemed to have achieved an overwhelming victory. By late July, the Dutch position had stabilised and they gained the support of Brandenburg-Prussia, Emperor Leopold and Charles II of Spain. With new fronts opening in Spain and the Rhineland, Louis decided to withdraw from the Dutch Republic by the end of 1673.

Bellefonds and his two colleagues had been taken back into service in November 1672 and he was put in charge of operations in the Netherlands. All Dutch towns held by the French were evacuated except for Grave and Maastricht, providing him with an army of 15,000 troops. Ignoring orders to remain on the defensive, in May 1674 he attacked and captured Fort Navagne and Argenteau, Spanish-held positions on the Meuse between Maastricht and Liège. A large Allied army was based nearby, which left his force dangerously exposed; Conde managed to reinforce him first but Bellefonds was removed from command.

While he never recovered his previous office in the Maison du Roi, in 1680 he was appointed head of household or Grand Ecuyer to La Dauphine, Maria Anna of Bavaria, a position he held until her death in April 1690. In the 1683–1684 War of the Reunions, he once again commanded the French army in Catalonia and besieged the town of Girona, although he was forced to retreat in May 1684, shortly before the Truce of Ratisbon.

Bellefonds had been acquainted with James II of England since the 1650s and following his exile to France in the 1688 Glorious Revolution, accompanied him on religious retreats to La Trappe Abbey. In 1690, he was nominated general of French forces fighting in the Williamite War in Ireland to restore James to his throne but the Marquis de St Ruth was selected instead and was killed at Aughrim in July 1691. In 1692, he was given command of the expeditionary corps assembled at Saint-Vaast-la-Hougue to support a proposed invasion of England. This ended after an inconclusive naval battle between the French and a combined Anglo-Dutch fleet at Barfleur on 29 May; a few days later, 12 French ships that had taken refuge at La Hogue were destroyed, while French land forces failed to intervene. Clearly fearing he would be blamed, Bellefonds wrote a lengthy explanation to the naval minister, the Comte de Pontchartrain.

Regardless of who was to blame, this was his final military command; he died on 4 December 1694 at the Château de Vincennes and buried in Sainte-Chapelle de Vincennes, next to his daughter Françoise Bonne who died in 1693. His eldest son Louis-Christophe was killed at Steenkerque in 1692 and his titles and estates were inherited by his grandson, Louis-Charles Bernadin (1685–1710).

== Legacy ==
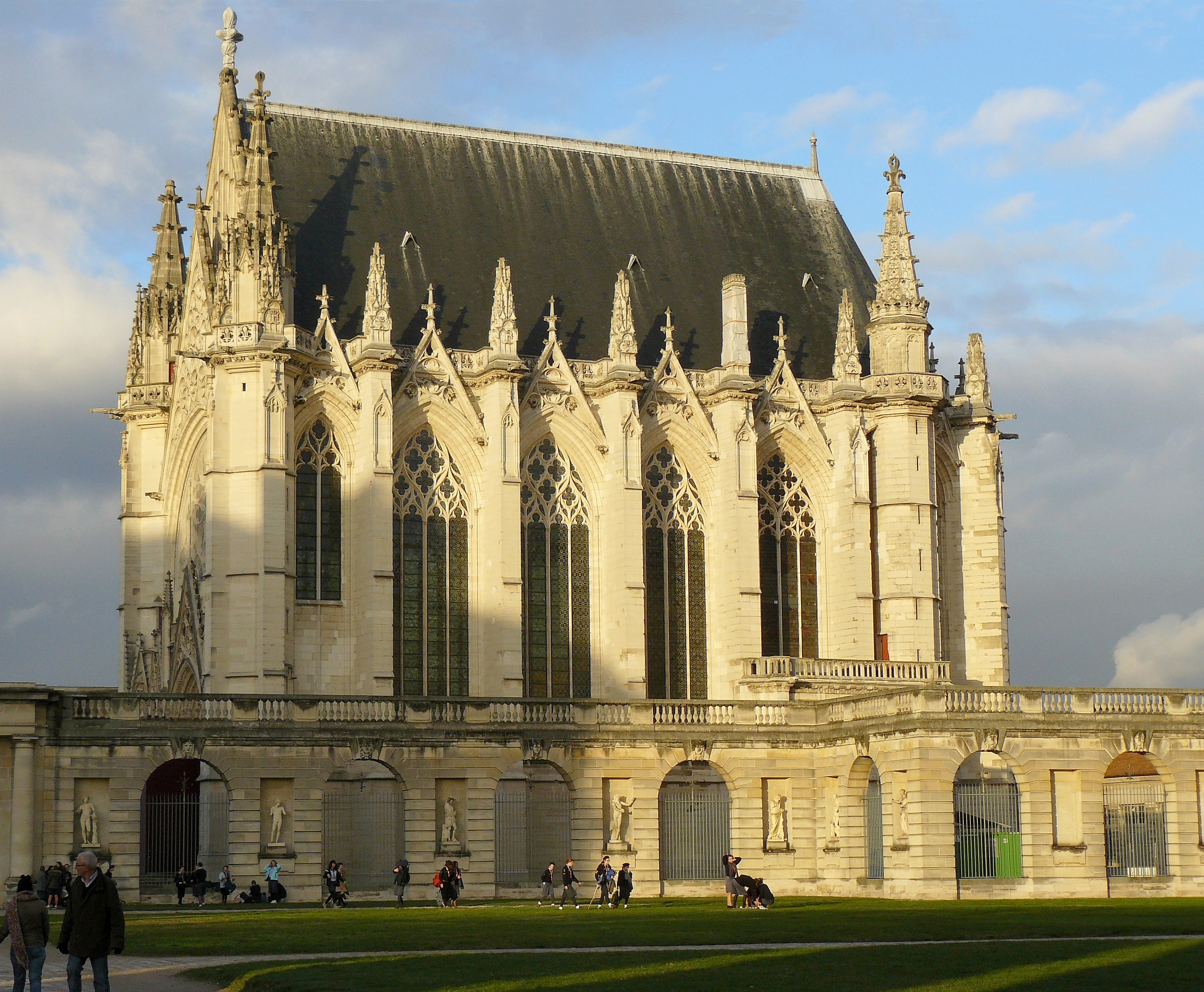
Sainte-Chapelle de Vincennes, where Bellefonds was buried

Bellefonds was considered by contemporaries to be a man of morality but inflexible once he had decided on a course of action, which led to his banishment in 1672 and removal from command in 1674. He was known for religious piety, financing Notre-Dame-des-Anges, a convent near Rouen established in 1650 by his aunt, Laurence Gigault de Bellefonds (1610–1683). He was also associated with the abbey of Port-Royal-des-Champs, a centre of Jansenist thought, a then popular doctrine within French Catholicism controversial for its similarities to Calvinism. Finally, he was close to Jacques-Bénigne Bossuet, Bishop to the Court at Versailles, and like him supported the decision of Louis' mistress Louise de La Vallière to enter a Carmelite convent in Paris in 1675.

His letters to and from Louis XIV concerning the education of the Dauphin were later collected and published in Lettres sur l'éducation du dauphin; suivies de Lettres au maréchal de Belle-fonds et au roi. Introd. et notes de E. Levesque.

The Rue de Bellefond in Paris is named after his daughter Marie-Éléonore, Abbess of nearby Montmartre Abbey, demolished in 1794.

== Sources ==
- De La Chesnaye des Bois, François-Alexandre Aubert (1749). Dictionnaire de la Noblesse, Volume VII. Paris: Antoine-Boudet, Libraire-Imprimeur de roi.
- De Lacroix, Paul. "1651–1653 – La Fronde en Angoumois". Histoire Passion – Saintonge Aunis Angoumois.
- De Périni, Hardÿ (1896). Batailles françaises, Volume IV. Ernest Flammarion, Paris.;
- De Périni, Hardÿ (1896). Batailles françaises, Volume V. Ernest Flammarion, Paris.;
- Dupre, Anne Sophie (2010). Abbayes de Notre-Dame des Anges (Bellefonds) (PDF). Archives Departementales De La Seine-Maritime. Archived from the original (PDF) on 1 February 2019.
- de Sainte-Marie, Anselme, de Sainte-Rosalie, Ange (1730). Histoire de la Maison Royale de France, et des grands officiers de la Couronne. Paris: La Compagnie des libraires associez.;
- Hermann, Elizabeth (2005). Sex with Kings: 500 Years of Adultery, Power, Rivalry, and Revenge. William Morrow Paperbacks; 1st Harper Perennial Ed edition. ISBN 978-0060585440.
- Hume, Martin Andrew Sharp (2002). Spain: Its Greatness and Decay (1479–1788). Adamant Media Corporation. ISBN 978-0543784124.;
- Keogh, Jonathan Stuart (2013). Information and French Support for Jacobite Ireland, 1689-1691. University of Dundee.
- Lynn, John (1996). The Wars of Louis XIV, 1667-1714 (Modern Wars In Perspective). Longman. ISBN 978-0582056299.;
- Popoff, Michel, Pinoteau, Hervé (1996). Armorial de l'ordre du Saint-Esprit. Le Léopard d'or. ISBN 2-86377-140-X.; (in French)
- Swann, Julian (2017). Exile, Imprisonment, or Death: The Politics of Disgrace in Bourbon France, 1610-1789. OUP. ISBN 978-0198788690.;

French nobility
Preceded by Henri-Robert Gigault	Marquis de Bellefonds; 1643–1694	Succeeded by Louis-Charles Bernadin
Military offices
Preceded by Henri-Robert Gigault	Governor of Valognes; 1643–1694	Succeeded by
