= International relations (1648–1814) =

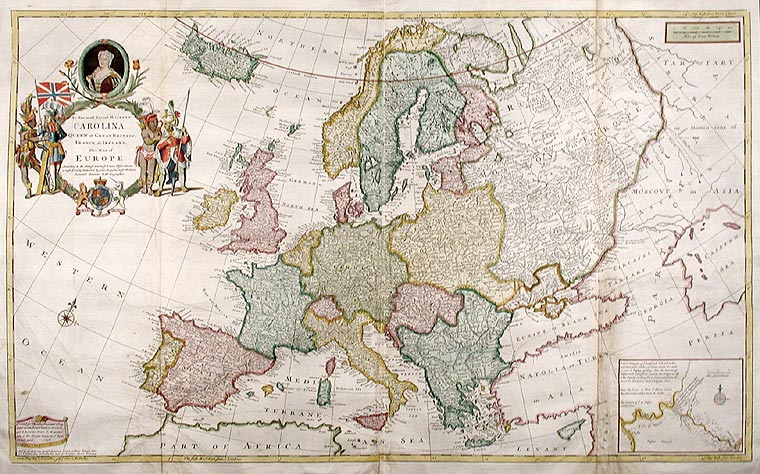
After the Peace of Westphalia in 1648, Europe's borders were largely stable. 1708 map by Herman Moll.

International relations from 1648 to 1814 covers the major interactions of the nations of Europe, as well as the other continents, with emphasis on diplomacy, warfare, migration, and cultural interactions, from the Peace of Westphalia to the Congress of Vienna.

== Diplomacy and warfare ==
The 17th century, 1601–1700, saw very little peace in Europe – major wars were fought every year except 1610, 1669 to 1671, and 1680 to 1682. The wars were unusually ugly. Europe in the late 17th century, 1648 to 1700, was an age of great intellectual, scientific, artistic and cultural achievement. Historian Frederick Nussbaum says it was:

prolific in genius, in common sense, and in organizing ability. It could properly have been expected that intelligence, comprehension and high purpose would be applied to the control of human relations in general and to the relations between states and peoples in particular. The fact was almost completely opposite. It was a period of marked unintelligence, immorality and frivolity in the conduct of international relations, marked by wars undertaken for dimly conceived purposes, waged with the utmost brutality and conducted by reckless betrayals of allies.

The worst came during the Thirty Years' War (1618–1648) which had an extremely negative impact on the civilian population of Germany and surrounding areas, with massive loss of life and disruption of the economy and society. Scholars taking a "realist" perspective on wars and diplomacy have emphasized the Peace of Westphalia (1648) as a dividing line. It ended the Thirty Years' War, where religion and ideology had been powerful motivating forces for warfare. Westphalia, in the realist view, ushered in a new international system of sovereign states of roughly equal strength, dedicated not to ideology or religion but to enhance status, and territorial gains. The Catholic Church, for example, no longer devoted its energies to the very difficult task of reclaiming dioceses lost to Protestantism, but to build large-scale missions in overseas colonial possessions that could convert the natives by the thousands using devoted members of society such as the Jesuits. According to Scott Hamish, the realist model assumes that "foreign policies were guided entirely by "Realpolitik," by the resulting struggle for resources and, eventually, by the search for what became known as a 'balance of power.'

Diplomacy before 1700 was not well developed, and chances to avoid wars were too often squandered. In England, for example, King Charles II paid little attention to diplomacy, which proved disastrous. During the Second Anglo-Dutch War, England had no diplomats stationed in Denmark or Sweden. When King Charles realized he needed them as allies, he sent special missions that were uninformed about local political, military, and diplomatic situations, and were ignorant of personalities and political factionalism. Ignorance produced a series of blunders that ruined their efforts to find allies.

France set the standards for the new professional diplomacy, which were soon emulated by the other powers; the French language became the diplomatic tongue. The professional model slowly spread other national government agencies, and included distinct specified scope of operations, a full-time career oriented professional leadership at the top and middle ranks; a code of ethics and standards of expected behavior; and attractive pay scales and retirement pensions. Expertise was highly valued, although at the very highest level aristocratic status and family connections played an important role. The new bureaucracy preserved its documents carefully and central archives, maintain a professional office staff, and gained a reputation at home and abroad for the quality of its work in expressing both the short term needs and long-term alliances and values of the state. King Louis XIV worked hard to systematically develop the most sophisticated diplomatic service, with permanent ambassadors and lesser ministers in major and minor capitals, all preparing steady streams of information and advice to Paris. Diplomacy became a career that proved highly attractive to rich senior aristocrats who enjoyed very high society at royal courts, especially because they carried the status of the most powerful nation in Europe. Increasingly, other nations copied the French model; French became the language of diplomacy, replacing Latin. By the early 18th century European diplomats had established an elaborate system of etiquette and ceremonies. Most diplomats came from high-status nobility, and were familiar with such elaborate customs. In the realm of diplomacy, ceremonial methods served to distinguish the relative power and importance of the different countries involved, and facilitated informal discussions among senior diplomats.

By 1700, the British and Dutch built alliances using political diplomacy and financial incentives, and added to their power by hiring hiring regiments of soldiers such as the Hessians from mercenary princes in small countries. This diplomacy was enacted at peacemaking conferences throughout the 18th century, such as those at Utrecht (1713), Vienna (1738), Aix-la-Chapelle (1748), and Paris (1763).

== Second Hundred Years' War: France as the pivot of warfare ==
In 1648 France was the leading European power, and most of the wars pivoted around its aggressiveness. No one could match its population and wealth, central location, or very strong professional army. It had largely avoided the devastation of the Thirty Years War. Its weaknesses included an inefficient financial system that was hard-pressed to pay for all the military adventures, and the tendency of most other powers to form alliances and coalitions against it.

During the very long reign of King Louis XIV, France fought three major wars: the Franco-Dutch War, the Nine Years' War, and the War of the Spanish Succession. There were also two lesser conflicts: the War of Devolution and the War of the Reunions. The wars were very expensive but they defined Louis XIV's foreign policies, and his personality shaped his approach. Impelled "by a mix of commerce, revenge, and pique," Louis sensed that warfare was the ideal way to enhance his glory. In peacetime he concentrated on preparing for the next war. He taught his diplomats that their job was to create tactical and strategic advantages for the French military. By 1695, France retained much of its dominance, but had lost control of the seas to the combination of England and Holland. What's more, most countries, both Protestant and Catholic, were in alliance against it. Vauban, France's leading military strategist warned the king in 1689 that a hostile "Alliance" was too powerful at sea. He recommended the best way for France to fight back was to license French merchants ships to privateer and seize enemy merchant ships, while avoiding its navies:

France has its declared enemies Germany and all the states that it embraces; Spain with all its dependencies in Europe, Asia, Africa and America; the Duke of Savoy [in Italy], England, Scotland, Ireland, and all their colonies in the East and West Indies; and Holland with all its possessions in the four corners of the world where it has great establishments. France has ... undeclared enemies, indirectly hostile hostile and envious of its greatness, Denmark, Sweden, Poland, Portugal, Venice, Genoa, and part of the Swiss Confederation, all of which states secretly aid France's enemies by the troops that they hire to them, the money they lend them and by protecting and covering their trade.

Vauban was pessimistic about France's so-called friends and allies:

For lukewarm, useless, or impotent friends, France has the Pope, who is indifferent; the King of England [James II] expelled from his country; the Grand Duke of Tuscany; the Dukes of Mantua, Modena, and Parma [all in Italy]; and the other faction of the Swiss. Some of these are sunk in the softness that comes of years of peace, the others are cool in their affections. ... The English and Dutch are the main pillars of the Alliance; they support it by making war against us in concert with the other powers, and they keep it going by means of the money that they pay every year to ... Allies. ... We must, therefore, fall back on privateering as the method of conducting war which is most feasible, simple, cheap, and safe, and which will cost least to the state, the more so since any losses will not be felt by the King, who risks virtually nothing. ... It will enrich the country, train many good officers for the King, and in a short time force his enemies to sue for peace.

== Europe: 1648–1721 ==
The European political scene changed in the late 17th century. Warfare was still a more powerful influence than demography, economics or diplomacy, so the major changes resulted from a series of large wars. At first France, with the largest population, a well-developed economy, and a good navy, was predominant. It lost part of its preeminence in stages during a series of major wars: the Nine Years' War, the War of the Spanish Succession, the Turkish wars of 1683–1699 and 1714–1718, and the Great Northern War. Europe was largely regionalized, with wars fought either in the West, the North, or the Southeast. By 1700, there were four major states, England, France, Russia, and the Habsburg Monarchy (also called Austria or the Holy Roman Empire). Prussia was emerging primarily because of its aggressive leadership and its advances in the military arts. Spain, Portugal, the Netherlands, Poland, Venice, Sweden, and the Ottoman Empire were declining powers after losses in a series of wars. In 1659, the Treaty of the Pyrenees marked the end of the Franco-Spanish war. The major powers each developed sophisticated diplomatic, military, and financial systems at the national level, with a striking fall-off of the autonomy of regional aristocrats. England, although wracked by an intense civil war, managed to gain strength internationally. Its Royal Navy reigned supreme on the oceans after a series of wars with the Netherlands. As an island nation secure from invasion, it could keep its army small, and invest in subsidies to support the armies of smaller countries to maintain its alliances. Its policy was to use diplomacy and enter wars on the weaker side so as to maintain a balance of power, and to thwart the danger of France maintaining its preeminence.

=== Espionage ===
The 18th century saw a dramatic expansion of espionage activities. It was a time of war: in nine years out of ten, two or more major powers were at war. Armies grew much larger, with corresponding budgets. Likewise the foreign ministries all grew in size and complexity. National budgets expanded to pay for these expansions, and room was found for intelligence departments with full-time staffs, and well-paid spies and agents. The militaries themselves became more bureaucratised, and sent out military attachés. They were very bright, personable middle-ranking officers stationed in embassies abroad. In each capital, the attaches evaluated the strength, capabilities, and war plans of the armies and navies. France under King Louis XIV was the largest, richest, and most powerful nation. It had many enemies and a few friends, and tried to keep track of them all through a well organized intelligence system. France and England pioneered the cabinet noir whereby foreign correspondence was opened and deciphered, then forwarded to the recipient. France's chief ministers, especially Cardinal Mazarin (1642–1661) did not invent the new methods; they combined the best practices from other states, and supported it at the highest political and financial levels.

=== Population and army strength ===
Main European countries	Population about 1648	Army about 1690
France	15 Million	130 Thousand
Holy Roman Empire (Austria)	8 Million	50 Thousand
Brandenburg-Prussia	1.4 Million	25 Thousand
Italian states	12 Million	Unknown
Low Countries	3.5 Million	73 Thousand (Netherlands)
British Isles	7.5 Million	80 Thousand (England)
Scandinavia	2.5 Million	90 Thousand (Sweden)
Source:	Stearns, Encyclopedia (2001) p 284	Blanning, Pursuit of Glory (2007) p 289

=== The Dutch Republic as a great power ===
1648 had seen the end of the Eighty Years War between Spain and the Netherlands, resulting in the independence of the Dutch Republic while Spain retained control of the Spanish Netherlands. The Dutch were the greatest naval power in the world and dominated sea trade with Asia and the Americas and intra-European trade routes from the Baltic Sea to Portugal. In the age of mercantalist economic policies, this led to conflict with the growing colonial powers of England and France. Three Anglo-Dutch Wars were fought from 1652 to 1674 with nearly all battles being naval. The first two wars did not resolve the underlying dispute. In 1672, Louis XIV invaded the Netherlands in what became known as the Franco-Dutch War. Louis called for English support under a secret treaty, and nearly overran the Dutch, but was slowed by the flooding of the Dutch Water Line and the entrance of Spain, Brandenburg-Prussia, and the Austrian Hapsburgs on the Dutch side forced Louis to divide his forces. England made peace with the Dutch in 1674 after several disastrous defeats and eventually joined the alliance against France. The war dragged into a stalemate and concluded with the Peace of Nijmegen which resulted in limited territorial gains for the French, mainly at the expense of the Spanish Habsburgs and smaller German princes. Following the Glorious Revolution when the leader of the Dutch Republic, William of Orange, became King of England. William continued to lead the European opposition to Louis XIV's expansionism the locus of political, financial, and mercantile power slowly shifted from the Amsterdam to London.

=== Great Turkish War: 1683–1699 ===
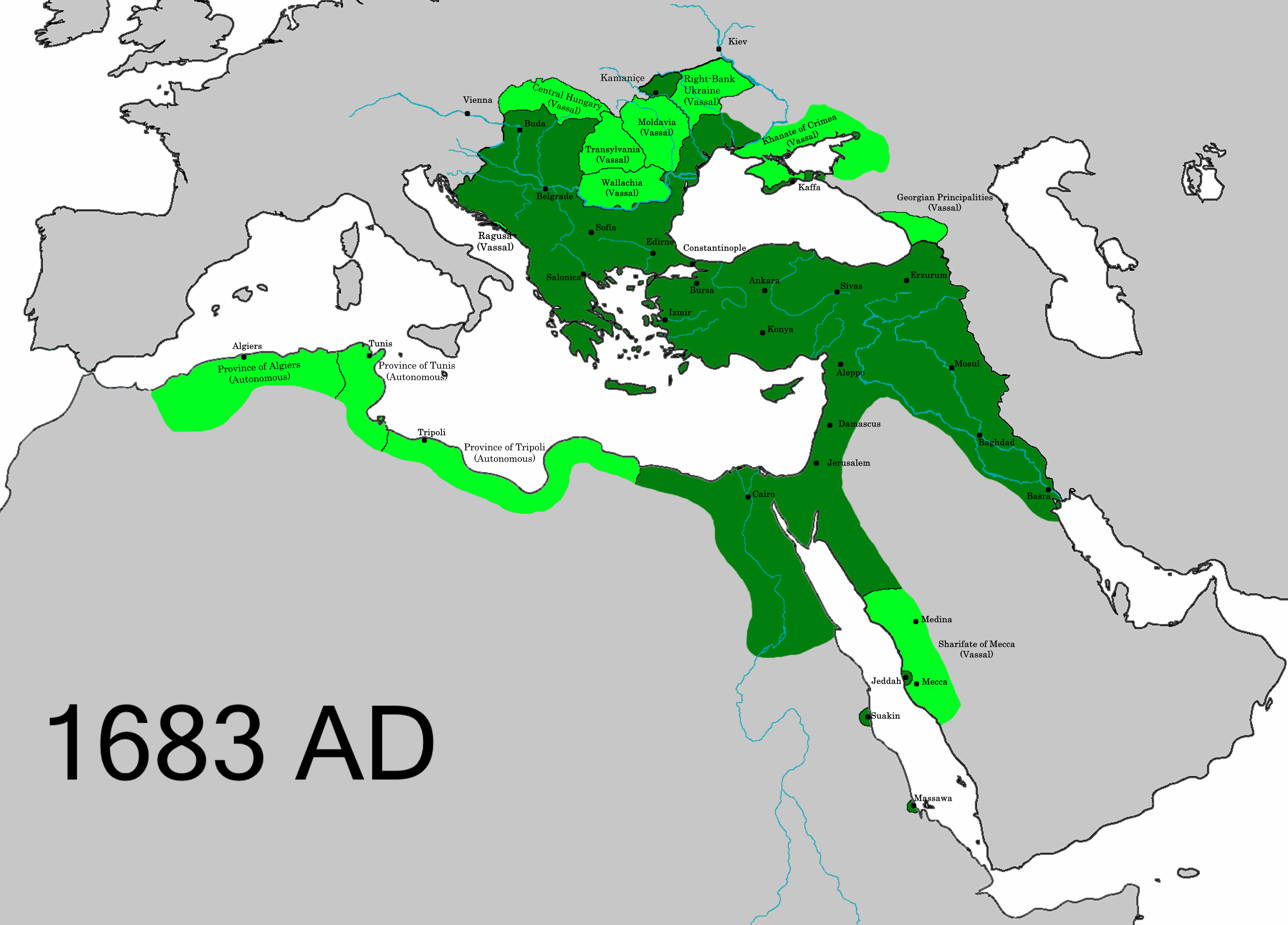
The Ottoman Empire in 1683; core possessions in dark green; vassal or autonomous areas in light green.

The Great Turkish War or the "War of the Holy League" was a series of conflicts between the Ottoman Empire and ad-hoc European coalition the Holy League (Latin: Sacra Ligua). The coalition was organized by Pope Innocent XI and included the Papal States, the Holy Roman Empire under Habsburg Emperor Leopold I, the Polish–Lithuanian Commonwealth of John III Sobieski, and the Venetian Republic; Russia joined the League in 1686. Intensive fighting began in 1683 when Ottoman commander Kara Mustafa brought an army of 200,000 soldiers to besiege, Vienna. The issue was control of Central and Eastern Europe. By September, the invaders were defeated in full retreat down the Danube. It ended with the signing of the Treaty of Karlowitz in 1699. The war was a defeat for the Ottoman Empire, which for the first time lost large amounts of territory. It lost lands in Hungary and Poland, as well as part of the western Balkans. The war marked the first time Russia was involved in a western European alliance.

=== British policy under William III (1689–1702) ===
William III exerted tight personal control over diplomacy and foreign policy. The primary reason the English elite called on William to invade England in 1688 was to overthrow King James II, and stop his efforts to reestablish Catholicism. However the primary reason William accepted the challenge was to gain a powerful ally in his war to contain the threatened expansion of King Louis XIV of France. William's goal was to build coalitions against the powerful French monarchy, protect the autonomy of the Netherlands (where William continued in power) and to keep the Spanish Netherlands (present-day Belgium) out of French hands. The English elite was intensely anti-French, and generally supported William's broad goals. For his entire career in Netherlands and Britain, William was the arch-enemy of Louis XIV. The French king, in turn, denounced William as a usurper who had illegally taken the throne from the legitimate King James II, and ought to be overthrown. In May 1689, William, now king of England, with the support of Parliament, declared war on France.

England and France were at war almost continuously until 1713, with a short interlude 1697–1701 made possible by the Treaty of Ryswick. The combined English and Dutch fleets could overpower France in a far-flung naval war, but France still had superiority on land. William wanted to neutralize that advantage by allying with Leopold I, the Habsburg Emperor of the Holy Roman Empire (1658–1705), who was based in Vienna, Austria. Leopold, however, was tied down in war with the Ottoman Empire on his eastern frontiers; William worked to achieve a negotiated settlement between the Ottomans and the Empire. William displayed in imaginative Europe-wide strategy, but Louis always managed to come up with a counter play.

William was usually supported by the English leadership, which saw France as its greatest enemy. But eventually the expenses, and war weariness, caused second thoughts. At first, Parliament voted him the funds for his expensive wars, and for his subsidies to smaller allies. Private investors created the Bank of England in 1694; it provided a sound system that made financing wars much easier by encouraging bankers to loan money.

=== Nine Years War: 1688–1697 ===
The Nine Years' War (1688–1697), also called the War of the League of Augsburg, was a major conflict between France and a European-wide coalition of Austria and the Holy Roman Empire, the Dutch Republic, Spain, Britain, and Savoy. It was fought on the European continent and the surrounding seas, Ireland, North America and in India. It is sometimes considered the first truly global war. It also encompassed a theatre in Ireland and in Scotland, where William III and James II struggled for control of Britain and Ireland, and a campaign in colonial North America between French and English settlers and their respective Native American allies, today called King William's War by Americans.

Louis XIV had emerged from the Franco-Dutch War in 1678 as the most powerful monarch in Europe, an absolute ruler who had won numerous military victories. Using a combination of aggression, annexation, and quasi-legal means, Louis XIV set about extending his gains to stabilize and strengthen France's frontiers, culminating in the brief War of the Reunions (1683–1684). The resulting Truce of Ratisbon guaranteed France's new borders for twenty years, but Louis XIV's subsequent actions – notably his revocation of the Edict of Nantes in 1685 – led to the deterioration of his military and political dominance. Louis XIV's decision to cross the Rhine in September 1688 was designed to extend his influence and pressure the Holy Roman Empire into accepting his territorial and dynastic claims. But when Leopold I and the German princes resolved to resist, and when the States General and William III brought the Dutch and the English into the war against France, the French King at last faced a powerful coalition aimed at curtailing his ambitions.

William III of England became the main allied leader. Historian J.R. Jones states that King William was given:

supreme command within the alliance throughout the Nine Years war. His experience and knowledge of European affairs made him the indispensable director of Allied diplomatic and military strategy, and he derived additional authority from his enhanced status as king of England – even the Emperor Leopold...recognized his leadership. William's English subjects played subordinate or even minor roles in diplomatic and military affairs, having a major share only in the direction of the war at sea. Parliament and the nation had to provide money, men and ships, and William had found it expedient to explain his intentions...but this did not mean that Parliament or even ministers assisted in the formulation of policy.

William's main strategy was to form a military alliance of England, the Netherlands, the Holy Roman Empire, Spain, and some smaller states, to attack France at sea, and from land in different directions, while defending the Netherlands. Louis XIV tried to undermine this strategy by refusing to recognize William as king of England, and by giving diplomatic, military and financial support to a series of pretenders to the English throne, all based in France. Williams focused most of his attention on foreign policy and foreign wars, spending a great deal of time in the Netherlands (where he continued to hold the dominant political office). His closest foreign-policy advisers were Dutch, most notably William Bentinck, 1st Earl of Portland; they shared little information with their English counterparts. The net result was that the Netherlands remained independent, and France never took control of the Spanish Netherlands. The wars were very expensive to both sides but inconclusive. William died just as the continuation war, the War of the Spanish Succession (1702–1714) was beginning.

The main fighting took place around France's borders: in the Spanish Netherlands; the Rhineland; Duchy of Savoy; and the Principality of Catalonia. The fighting generally favoured Louis XIV's armies, but by 1696 his country was in the grip of an economic crisis. The Maritime Powers (England and the Dutch Republic) were also financially exhausted, and when Savoy defected from the Alliance all parties were keen for a negotiated settlement. By the terms of the Peace of Ryswick (1697), Louis XIV retained the whole of Alsace, but he was forced to return Lorraine to its ruler and give up any gains on the right bank of the Rhine. Louis XIV also accepted William III as the rightful King of England, while the Dutch acquired their Barrier fortress system in the Spanish Netherlands to help secure their own borders. However, with the ailing and childless Charles II of Spain approaching his end, a new conflict over the inheritance of the Spanish Empire would soon embroil Louis XIV and the Grand Alliance in a final war – the War of the Spanish Succession.

=== Great Northern War: 1700–1721 ===
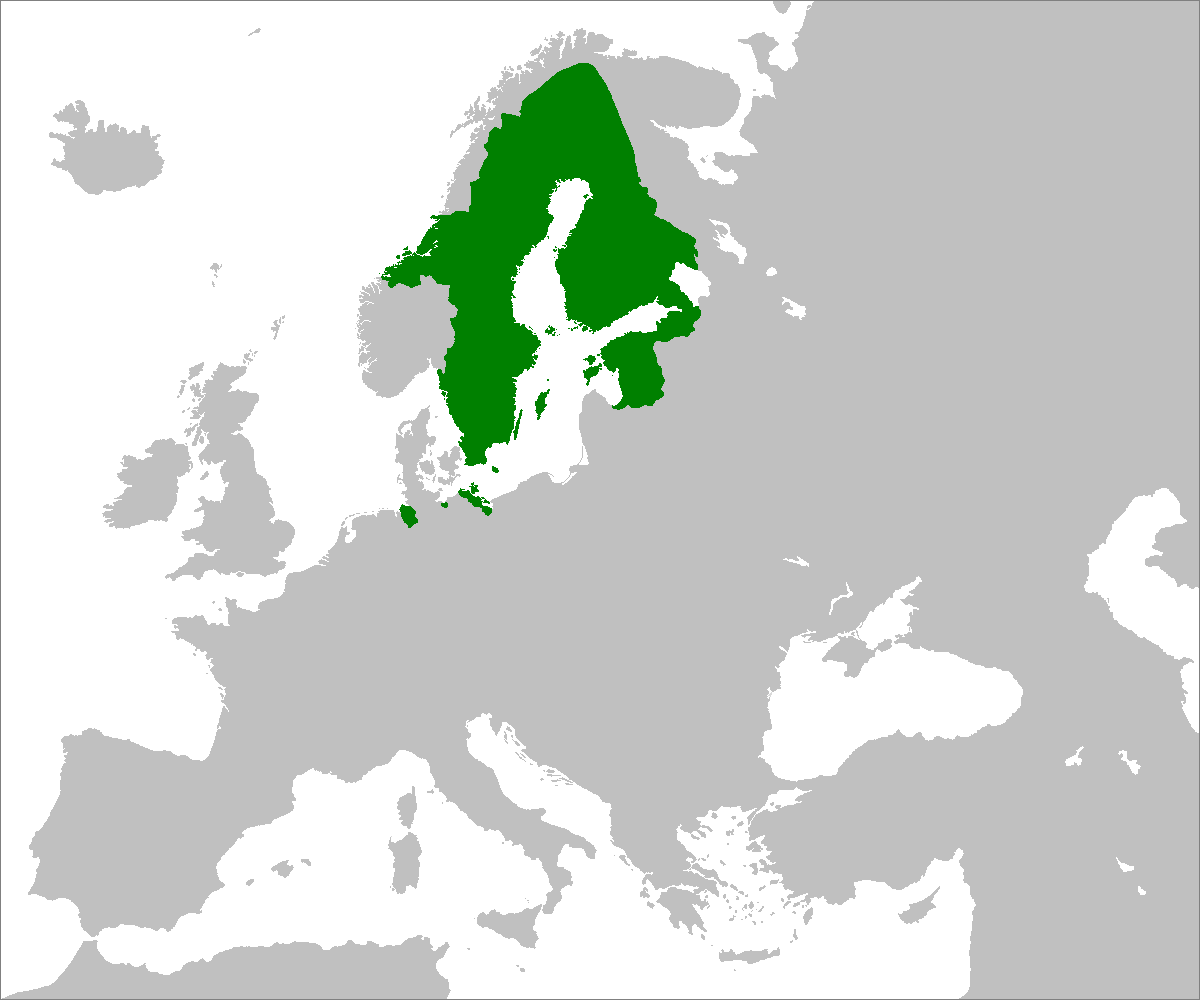
The Swedish Empire at its height in 1658

From 1560 to 1660, Sweden had engaged in large-scale territorial expansion in the Baltic region, at the expense of Denmark and Poland.

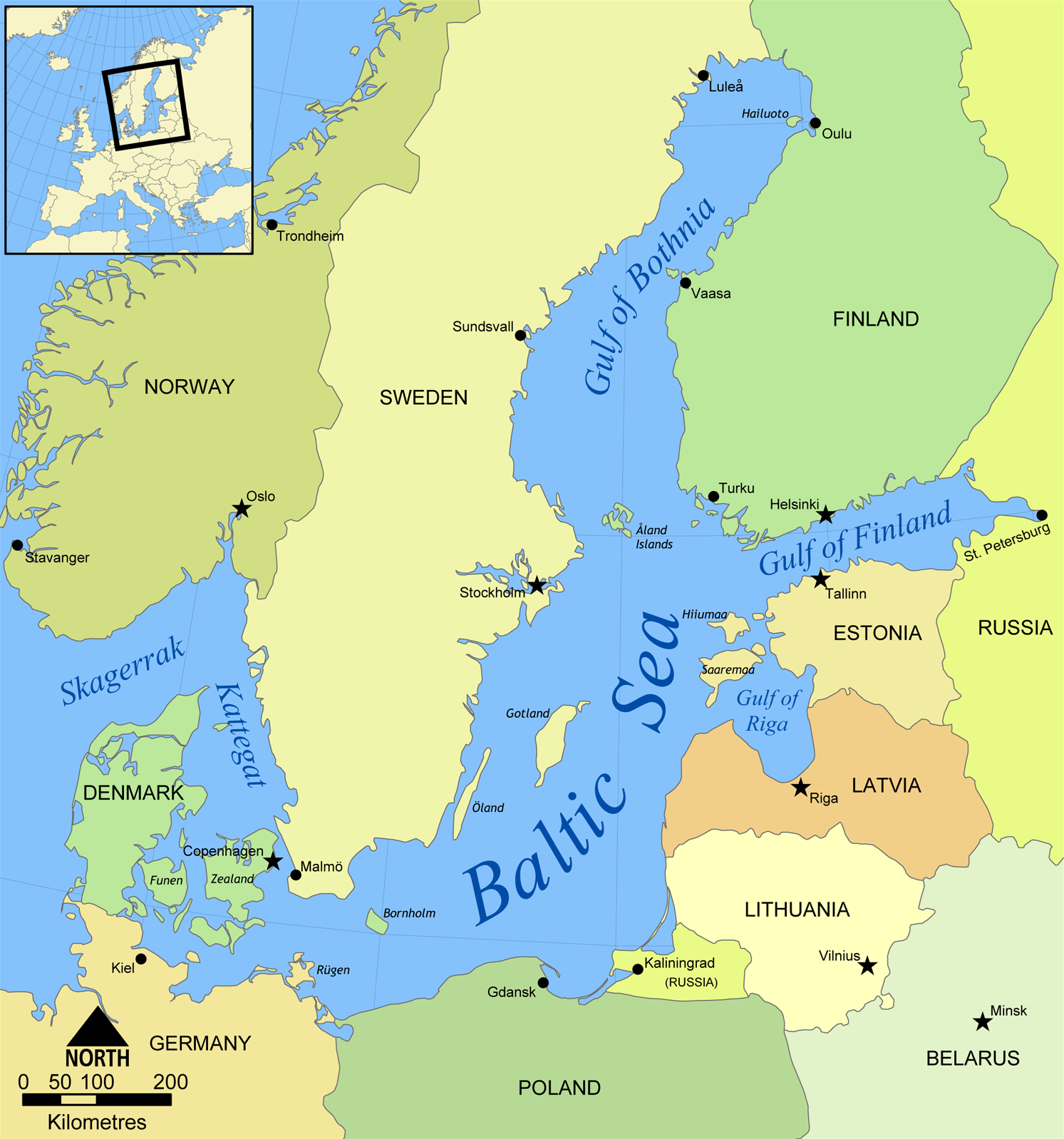
Baltic Sea region in 21st century

In 1700, Denmark, Poland and Russia, the countries that had lost the most territory to Sweden, jointly declared war. Denmark was soon forced to peace after a joint intervention of Swedish, English and Dutch armies. King Charles XII took his Swedish army to the Baltic provinces, where Russian and Polish armies were laying siege to several towns. He defeated the Russian army in the Battle of Narva. Charles then moved into Poland with the intent of dethroning the Polish king Augustus II. This took several years, but in 1706, with the Treaty of Altranstädt, he reached his goal.

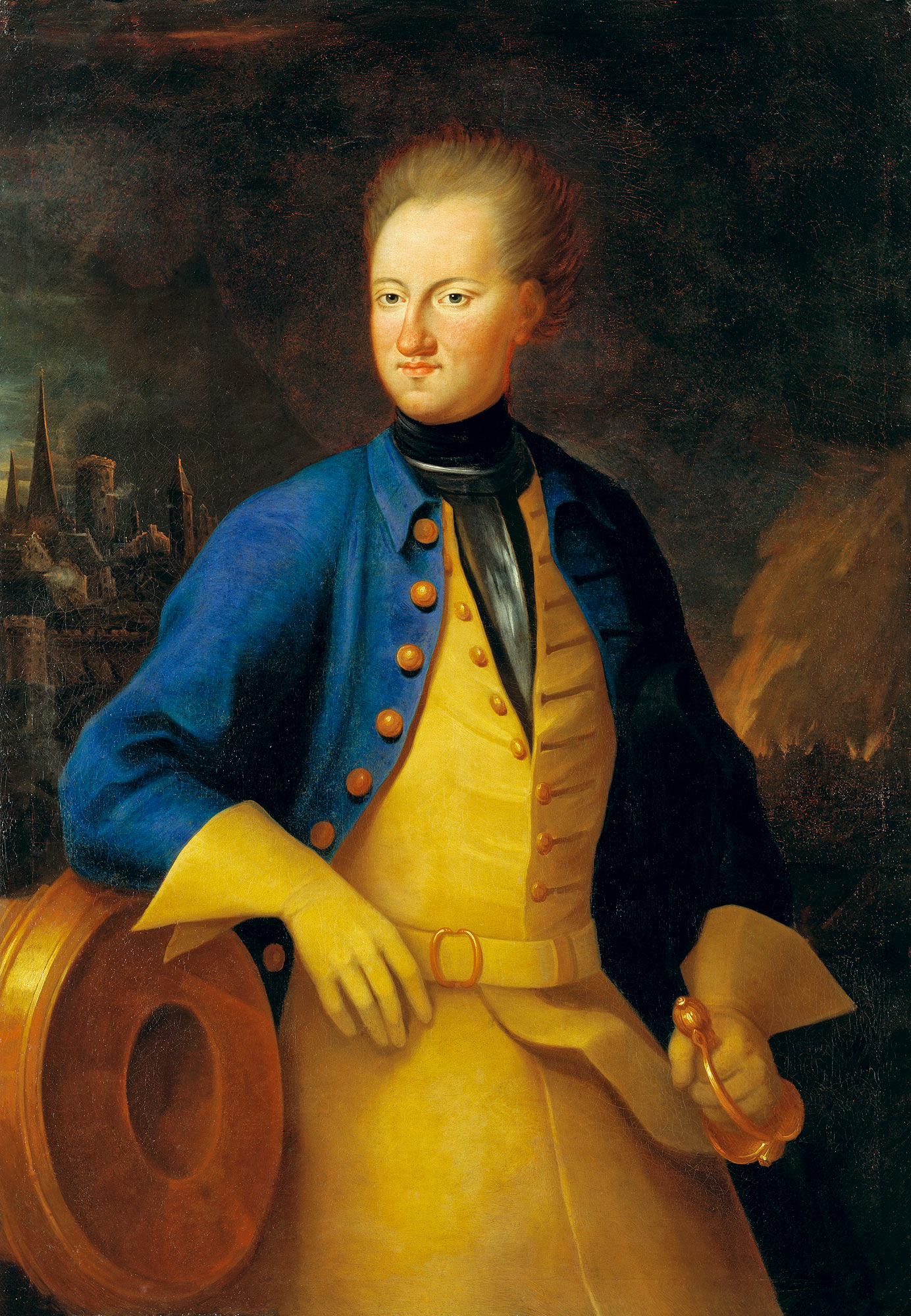
Charles XII of Sweden

In the meantime, Russia had managed to take possession of several towns by the Baltic Sea. Instead of trying to retake these, Charles chose to march directly on Moscow, but due to extremely cold weather, failures in his supply lines and the Russian scorched earth strategy, he was forced to turn towards Ukraine. He had lost most of his soldiers and supplies but Charles, trusting in supposedly superior skills, faced the Russians in 1709. Russia under Tsar Peter the Great had recently modernized its military forces, and won a decisive victory at the Battle of Poltava. Charles managed to escape south to the Ottoman Empire, which gave him refuge for six years. Following Poltava, Poland and Denmark re-entered the war, along with other countries wanting parts of the Swedish provinces. In the following years, most of them would fall, and Russia occupied the eastern half of Sweden (present-day Finland). Sweden lost control of the eastern Baltic and never recovered its former greatness. Instead Russia gained Finland and access to the Baltic Sea, gaining recognition as a European power.

==== Russia ====
All the main decisions in the Russian Empire were made by the tsar (tsarist autocracy), so there was a uniformity of policy and a forcefulness during the long regimes of powerful leaders such as Peter the Great and Catherine the Great. However, there were numerous weak tsars—such as children with a regent in control—as well as numerous plots and assassinations. With weak tsars or rapid turnover there was unpredictability and even chaos.

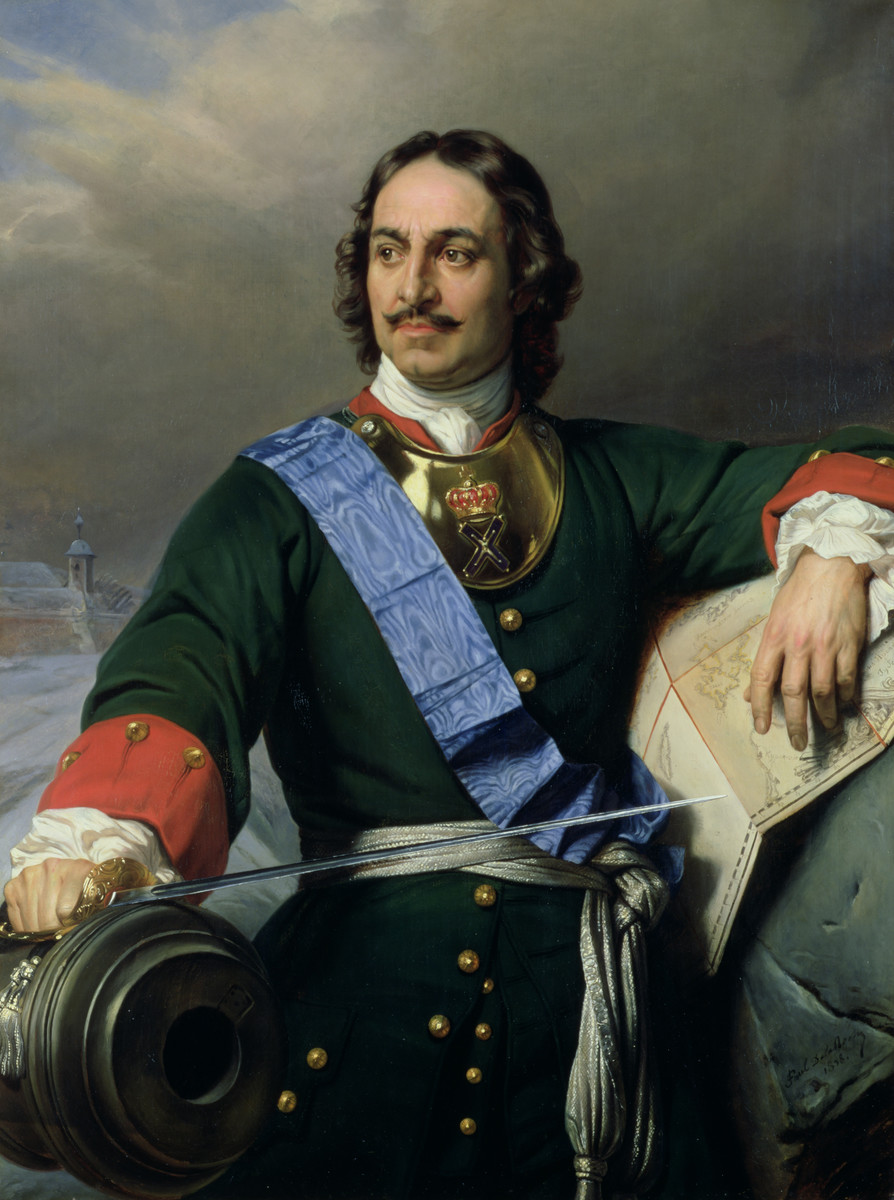
Peter the Great officially renamed the Tsardom of Russia as the Russian Empire in 1721, and became its first emperor.

Geographical expansion by warfare and treaty was the central strategy of Russian foreign policy from the small Muscovite state of the 16th century to World War I in 1914. The goals were territory, warm water ports, and protection of Orthodox Christianity. The main weapon was the very large and increasingly well-trained Imperial Russian Army, although the large domestic economy was poor and was hard-pressed to provide adequate support given the poor transportation system.

To the northwest, Russia engaged in a century long struggle against Sweden for control of the Baltic Sea. Peter the Great systematically remodeled the Russian administrative and military system along Western lines, building up a large army in the process. The Russian Navy remains small and unimportant. The empire succeeded by the 1720s, obtaining not just access to the sea but ownership of Finland and the Baltic states of Latvia, Lithuania and Estonia. To the west, there were a series of wars with Poland and Lithuania, followed by negotiated settlements with Prussia and Austria that gave Russia control of most of Ukraine, and a large slice of Poland.

Napoleon at one point was willing to split Eastern Europe with Russia. In 1812, he unsuccessfully challenged the Russians directly with his 1812 invasion of Russia. The invasion was repelled with heavy losses, and Russia played a decisive role in defeating Napoleon, any new territory, and played a strong conservative voice in the affairs of Europe from 1814 to the 1840s.

=== The War of the Spanish Succession: 1702–1714 ===
Spain had a number of major assets, apart from its homeland itself. It controlled important territory in Europe, especially the Spanish Netherlands (which eventually became Belgium) and the Franche-Comté province on France's eastern border, as well as a large portion of southern Italy and Sicily. Overseas it had a major empire that dominated much of the New World, including South America, Mexico, Central America, and some critical West Indies islands such as Cuba. Other possessions included the Philippine Islands. The overseas territories were an important outlet for migration by the Spanish population. Most important of all, Spain's colonies produced enormous quantities of silver, which were brought to Spain every few years in convoys. Spain had many weaknesses as well. Its home economy was poor, there was little business or industry, or advanced craftsmanship. It had to Import practically all its weapons. Spain had a large army but it was poorly trained and poorly equipped. It had a surprisingly small navy, for seamanship was a low priority among the Spanish elites. It never recovered from the self-inflicted disaster that destroyed half of the large Spanish Armada in 1588. Local and regional governments, and the local nobility, controlled most of the decision-making. The central government was quite weak, with a mediocre bureaucracy, and few able leaders. King Charles II reigned 1665 to 1700, but he was in very poor physical and mental health.

King Charles II had no children, and which of two rival would become king of Spain unleashed a major war. Charles II represented the Habsburg family, and that family, based in Vienna, had its candidate. However the Bourbons, based in Paris, also had a candidate: the grandson of powerful King Louis XIV. Spain's silver, and its inability to protect its assets, made it a highly visible target for ambitious Europeans. For generations, Englishmen had contemplated capturing the treasure fleet—which happened only once—in 1628 by the Dutch. English mariners nevertheless seriously pursued the opportunities for plunder and trade in Spain's colonies.

Charles II made a disastrous decision: in his will he bequeathed his throne to the Bourbon candidate, a Frenchman who became Philip V of Spain. France, of course, rallied to the choice. However a coalition of enemies quickly formed, and a major European war broke out 1701–1714. The notion of France gaining enormous strength by taking over Spain and all its European and overseas possessions was anathema to France's main rivals. Secondly the prospect of dividing up Spanish holdings prove very attractive. France's enemies formed a Grand Alliance, led by the Holy Roman Empire's Leopold I. It included Prussia and most of the other German states, the Netherlands, Portugal, Savoy (in Italy), and especially England. France took control of Spanish forces and added a few allies in Bavaria and among several local dukes in Italy and Germany. Extensive fighting took place primarily in the Netherlands, with both sides swaying back and forth. When Emperor Leopold died, he was succeeded by his oldest son Joseph. However, when Joseph died in 1711, his brother Charles became not only the Alliance candidate for king of Spain, but he also became Emperor. That combination would make the Empire much too powerful, so the allies deserted the alliance, and peace was at hand. The Peace of Utrecht in 1713 resolved all of the issues. Philip V became king of Spain, and kept all his overseas colonies, but renounced any rights to the French throne. Spain lost its European holdings outside the homeland itself. As the former members of the alliance picked up their spoils. England gained Newfoundland, Nova Scotia, and Gibraltar, as well as trading rights in the Spanish colonies. Spain now had a new Bourbon government, which proved far more effective and energetic than the previous Habsburg rulers.

== Europe: 1715–1789 ==
=== Peaceful interlude: 1715–1740 ===
The quarter century after the Peace of Utrecht was harmonious, with no major wars, and only a few secondary military episodes of minor importance. For example, the War of Jenkins' Ear was a naval war between Britain and Spain regarding British smuggling into Spanish colonies. It started in 1739 and was fought in the Caribbean. After a small British victory in 1741, the Spanish repelled a major British invasion, and the fighting petered out with no gain to either side.

The main powers had exhausted themselves in warfare, with many deaths, disabled veterans, ruined navies, high pension costs, heavy loans and high taxes. Utrecht strengthened the sense of useful international law and inaugurated an era of relative stability in the European state system, based on balance-of-power politics that no one country would become dominant. Robert Walpole, the key British policy maker, prioritized peace in Europe because it was good for his trading nation and its growing British Empire. British historian G. M. Trevelyan argues:

That Treaty [of Utrecht], which ushered in the stable and characteristic period of Eighteenth-Century civilization, marked the end of danger to Europe from the old French monarchy, and it marked a change of no less significance to the world at large, — the maritime, commercial and financial supremacy of Great Britain.

But "balance" needed armed enforcement. Britain played a key military role as "balancer." The goals were to bolster Europe's balance of power system to maintain the peace that was needed for British trade to flourish and its colonies to grow, and finally to strengthen its own central position in the balance of power system in which no nation could dominate the rest. Other nations recognized Britain as the "balancer." Eventually the balancing act required Britain to contain French ambitions. Containment led to a series of increasingly large-scale wars between Britain and France, which ended with mixed results. Britain was usually aligned with the Netherlands and Prussia, and subsidised their armies. These wars enveloped all of Europe and the overseas colonies. These wars took place in every decade starting in the 1740s and climaxed in the defeat of Napoleon's France in 1814.

==== Louis XV ====
In sharp contrast to the hyperactive Louis XIV, his successor was largely uninterested in the complex diplomacy and warfare during his long reign. His active role began in 1722 and lasted to 1774. France's main foreign policy decision-maker was Cardinal Fleury. He recognized that France needed to rebuild, so he pursued a peace policy. France had a poorly designed taxation system, whereby tax farmers kept much of the money, and the treasury was always short. The banking system in Paris was undeveloped, and the treasury was forced to borrow at very high interest rates.

==== War of the Quadruple Alliance (1718–1720) ====
One of the few military episodes in Western Europe was the War of the Quadruple Alliance (1718–1720). In Vienna, Austria (formally the Holy Roman Empire) the Habsburg emperors were bickering with the new Bourbon King of Spain, Philip V, over Habsburg control of most of Italy. Philip V, and especially his wife Elisabeth Farnese and his chief minister Giulio Alberoni had designs on recovering much of Italy that Spain had lost to the Habsburgs in 1714 and perhaps even put Philip on the French throne. Spanish fleets captured Sicily and Sardinia. The Quadruple Alliance of Britain, France, Austria, the Dutch Republic, and (later) Savoy was a coalition formed to restore the balance of power and end Spanish threats. Naval victories by the Alliance proved decisive and Spain pulled back.

=== War of the Austrian Succession (1740–1748) ===
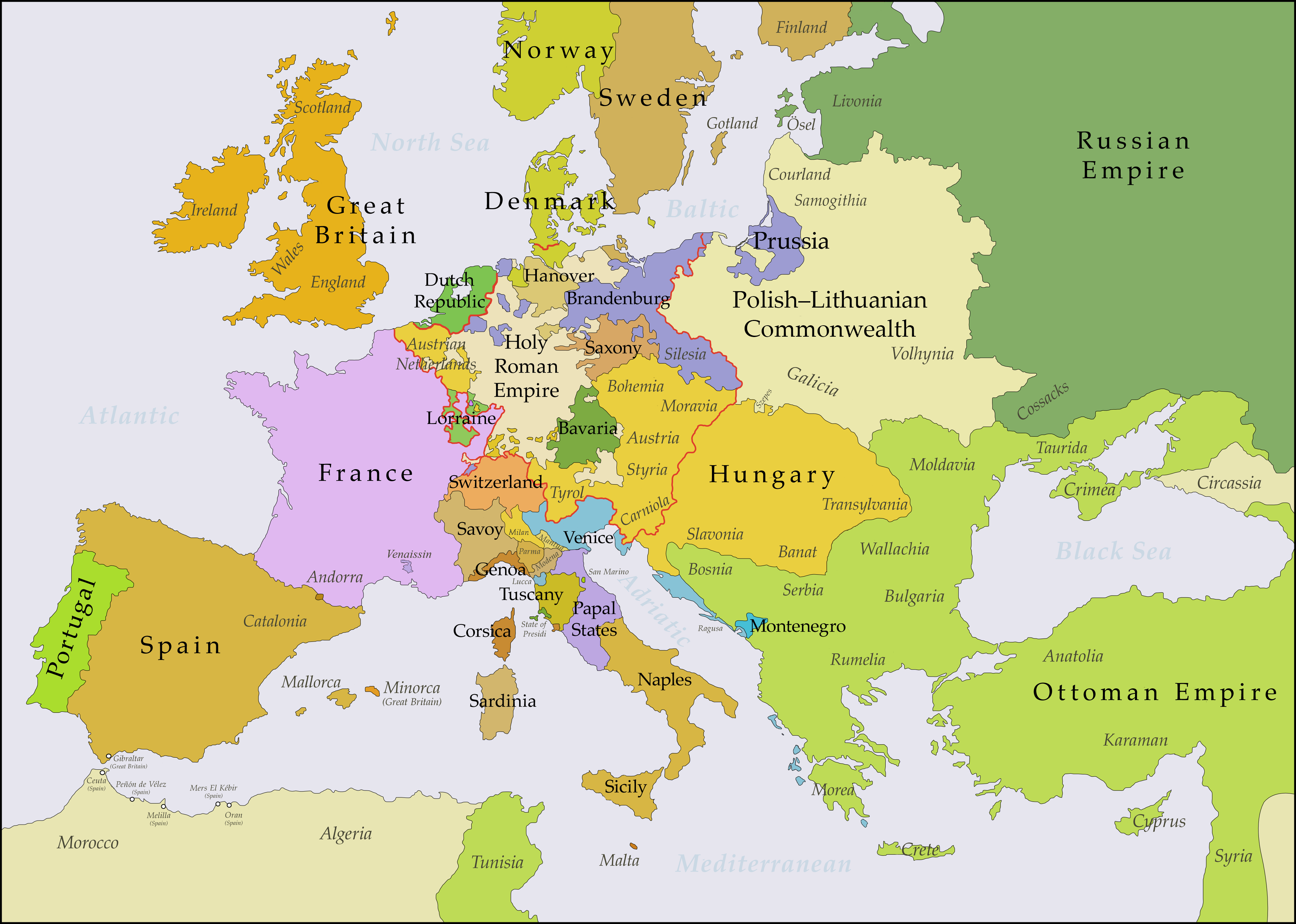
Europe in the years after the Treaty of Aix-la-Chapelle in 1748

The peaceful interlude was brought to a close by the War of the Austrian Succession. The last of the Bourbon-Hapsburg dynastic conflicts, the war was nominally over Maria Theresa's right to inherit from her father, Emperor Charles VI, rather than a male heir succeeding. In reality Bourbon France, and German rivals Prussia and Bavaria saw an opportunity to challenge Hapsburg power. Maria Theresa was backed by Britain, the Dutch Republic, and Hanover (also ruled by King George II of Great Britain). As the conflict widened, it drew in other participants, among them Spain, Sardinia, Saxony, Sweden and Russia. The war concluded in 1748 with the Treaty of Aix-la-Chapelle and very little in the way of territorial changes. Maria Theresa's inheritance was acknowledged, though Austria was forced to recognize Prussia's control of Silesia and cede control of several Italian duchies. The main results of the war were the recognition of Prussia's growing role as an international player and eventually the Diplomatic Revolution which saw Austria ally with France, ending the long-standing rivalry between the Bourbons and Hapsburg dynasties and pushing England into an alliance with Prussia to continue its efforts to contain French ambitions.

=== Britain: the trading nation ===
The major powers were primarily motivated toward territorial gains, and protection of their dynasties (such as the Habsburg and Bourbon dynasties or the House of Hohenzollern) in Prussia). Britain had a different primary interest (besides defense of the homeland). Its national policy was building a worldwide trading network for its merchants, manufacturers, shippers and financiers. This required a hegemonic Royal Navy so that no rival could sweep its ships from the world's trading routes, nor invade the British Isles. The London government enhanced the private sector by incorporating numerous privately financed London-based companies for establishing trading posts and opening import-export businesses across the world. Each was given a monopoly of English trade to a specified geographical region. The first enterprise was the Muscovy Company set up in 1555 to trade with Russia. Other prominent enterprises included the Levant Company, East India Company, and the Hudson's Bay Company in Canada. The Company of Royal Adventurers Trading to Africa had been set up in 1662 to trade in gold, ivory and slaves in Africa; it was reestablished as the Royal African Company in 1672 and focused on the slave trade. British involvement in each of the four major wars, 1740 to 1783, paid off handsomely in terms of trade. Even the loss of the Thirteen Colonies was made up by a very favorable trading relationship with the newly created United States. British gained dominance in the trade with India, and largely dominated the highly lucrative slave, sugar, and commercial trades originating in West Africa and the West Indies. China would be next on the agenda. Other powers set up similar monopolies on a much smaller scale; only the Netherlands emphasized trade as much as England.

London's financial system proved strikingly competent in funding not only the English forces, but its allies as well. The Treasury raised £46,000,000 in loans to pay for the wars with France of 1689–1697 and 1702–1713; by 1714 the national debt stood at £40,000,000, with a sinking fund operating to retire the debt. Queen Anne was dead, and her successor King George I was a Hanoverian who moved his court to London, but never learned English and surrounded himself with German advisors. They spent much of their time and most of their attention on Hanoverian affairs. He too was threatened by instability of the throne, for the Stuart pretenders, long supported by King Louis XIV, threatened repeatedly to invade through Ireland or Scotland, and had significant internal support from the Tory faction. However, Sir Robert Walpole was the dominant decision-maker, 1722–1740, although the role was not yet called prime minister. Walpole strongly rejected militaristic options, and promoted a peace program. He signed an alliance with France. The Netherlands was much reduced in power, and followed along with England.

=== Seven Years' War ===
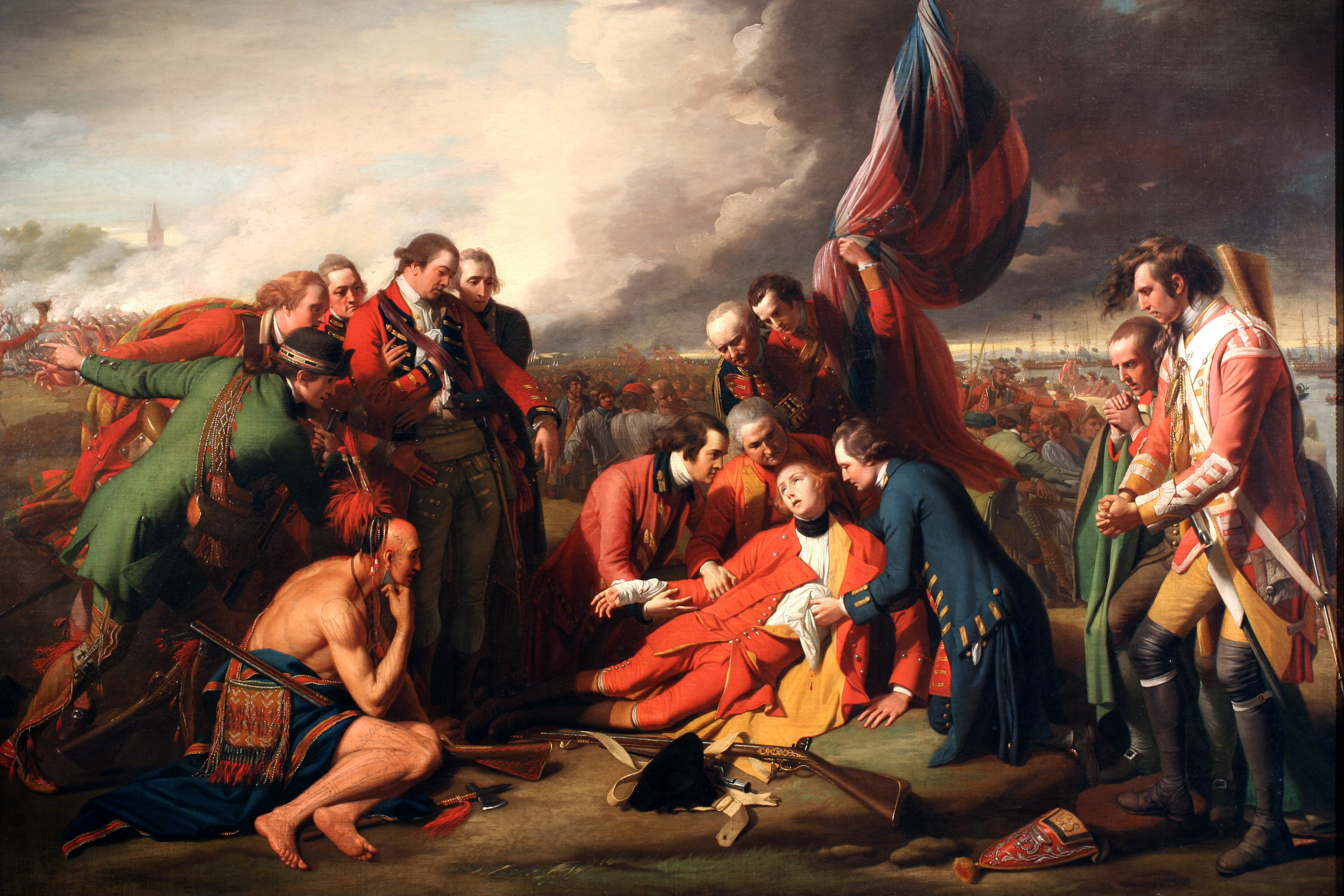
The Death of General Wolfe, on the Plains of Abraham, near Quebec

Louis XV is best known for losing badly in the worldwide Seven Years' War. In 1763, Louis ceded New France in North America to Spain and Great Britain after France's defeat in the war. He incorporated the territories of Lorraine and Corsica into the kingdom of France. Most scholars argue that Louis XV's decisions damaged the power of France, weakened the treasury, discredited the absolute monarchy, and made it more vulnerable to distrust and destruction. Evidence for this view is provided by the French Revolution, which broke out 15 years after his death. Norman Davies characterized Louis XV's reign as "one of debilitating stagnation," characterized by lost wars, endless clashes between the Court and Parlement, and religious feuds. A few scholars defend Louis, arguing that his highly negative reputation was based on later propaganda meant to justify the French Revolution. Jerome Blum described him as "a perpetual adolescent called to do a man's job."

=== American War for Independence ===
After victory against France in the Seven Years' War, the British government decided to rein in the rapidly growing American colonies, with 2.5 million population in contrast to Britain's 6 million. The new policy in 1765 of imposing taxes, without seeking the consent of colonial parliaments, was highly controversial in Britain itself. The taxes were small but the principle was great and the taxes angered leaders and public in all the Thirteen Colonies. The Americans claimed it violated their historic privileges as Englishmen and insisted on "No taxation without representation." For a dozen years different solutions were attempted, but London kept insisting on imposing taxes without consultation. When American patriots in 1773 destroyed a shipment of taxed British tea in Boston Harbor in the Boston Tea Party, London responded with severe punishment. The colonies rallied, and set up a Continental Congress to coordinate their actions. Large scale boycotts proved highly damaging to British merchants who lost their American market overnight. London sent in more troops to Boston, while the colonists organized and drilled their militia. Fighting broke out in 1775, and the American Patriots seize control of the Thirteen Colonies, expelling nearly all Royal officials. The king refused to compromise. An American Army, organized by Congress and under the control of general George Washington, forced the British out of Boston. After securing unanimous support from the legislatures of all thirteen states, Congress voted for independence on July 2. The Declaration of Independence, drafted largely by Thomas Jefferson, was unanimously adopted by the Congress on July 4.

Historian George Billias says:

Independence amounted to a new status of interdependence: the United States was now a sovereign nation entitled to the privileges and responsibilities that came with that status. America thus became a member of the international community, which meant becoming a maker of treaties and alliances, a military ally in diplomacy, and a partner in foreign trade on a more equal basis.

Benjamin Franklin, the chief American diplomat in Paris, proved highly popular with elite French opinion, including intellectuals and the Royal court. France wanted revenge after its defeat in the 1760s, and again heavily funding the American revolt. After the Americans captured a British invasion force at Saratoga, in upstate New York in 1777, the French officially declared war on Britain, recognize the independence of the new United States, and were joined officially by the Dutch (who recognized the United States) and Spanish (who did not). All of Europe was neutral, with the favoritism toward France and the United States. Britain had no major allies, but it did manage to hire tens of thousands of mercenaries from small German principalities such as Hesse. The Royal Navy was now outnumbered by the combined Allied navies, and the threat of an Allied invasion of the British Isles made its military situation precarious. The British had some success in sending a large invasion force into the southern United States, but a combined French-American army captured another invasion army at Yorktown in 1781, as the French Navy drove off a British rescue fleet. The United States was now effectively independent, and the British policy was to offer very good terms so as to guarantee strong Anglo-American foreign trade as soon as the war ended. The naval war was not over, however as the British made decisive gains against the French Navy, and protected Gibraltar against the Spanish threat. After the loss of the American colonies, Britain then turned its attention towards India and Asia, where they arguably regained most if not all of their losses. The long-term results were highly negative for France. It did achieve revenge, but its very heavy spending in the Seven Years' War and the American Revolutionary War effectively bankrupted the French treasury, setting the stage for the French Revolution in 1789.

=== Europe: French Revolution and Napoleon (1789–1815) ===
From 1793 to 1815, France was engaged almost continuously (with two short breaks) in wars with Britain and a changing coalition of other major powers. The many French successes led to the spread of the French revolutionary ideals into neighbouring countries, and indeed across much of Europe. However, the final defeat of Napoleon in 1814 (and 1815) brought a reaction that reversed some – but not all – of the revolutionary achievements in France and Europe. The Bourbons were restored to the throne, with the brother of executed King Louis XVI becoming King Louis XVIII.

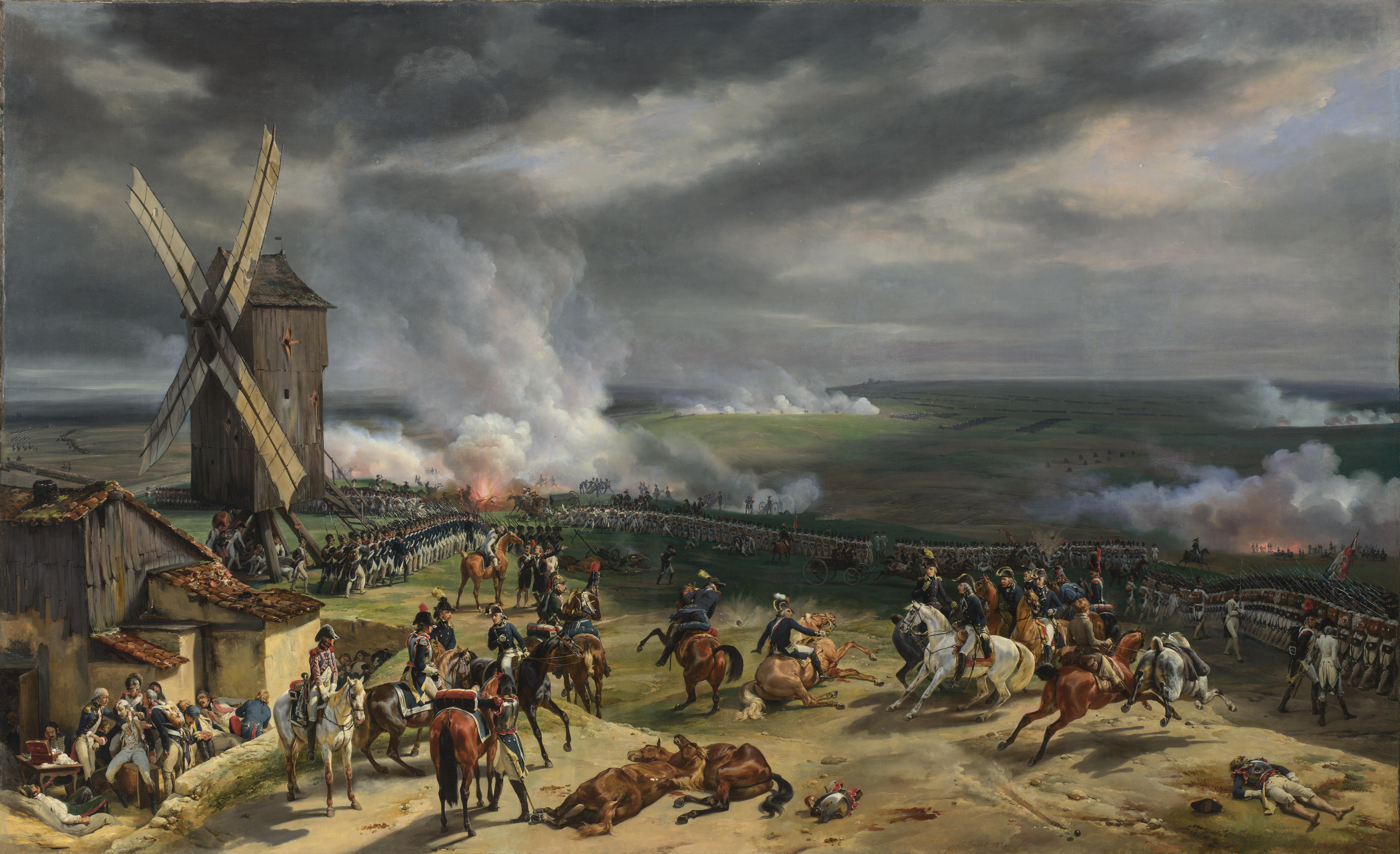
French victory over the Prussians at the Battle of Valmy on 20 September 1792

The politics of the period inevitably drove France towards war with Austria and its allies. The King, many of the Feuillants, and the Girondins specifically wanted to wage war. The King (and many Feuillants with him) expected war would increase his personal popularity; he also foresaw an opportunity to exploit any defeat: either result would make him stronger. The Girondins wanted to export the Revolution throughout Europe and, by extension, to defend the Revolution within France. The forces opposing war were much weaker. Barnave and his supporters among the Feuillants feared a war they thought France had little chance to win and which they feared might lead to greater radicalisation of the revolution. On the other end of the political spectrum Robespierre opposed a war on two grounds, fearing that it would strengthen the monarchy and military at the expense of the revolution, and that it would incur the anger of ordinary people in Austria and elsewhere. The Austrian emperor Leopold II, brother of Marie Antoinette, may have wished to avoid war, but he died on 1 March 1792. France preemptively declared war on Austria (20 April 1792) and Prussia joined on the Austrian side a few weeks later. The invading Prussian Army faced little resistance until checked at the Battle of Valmy (20 September 1792) and was forced to withdraw.

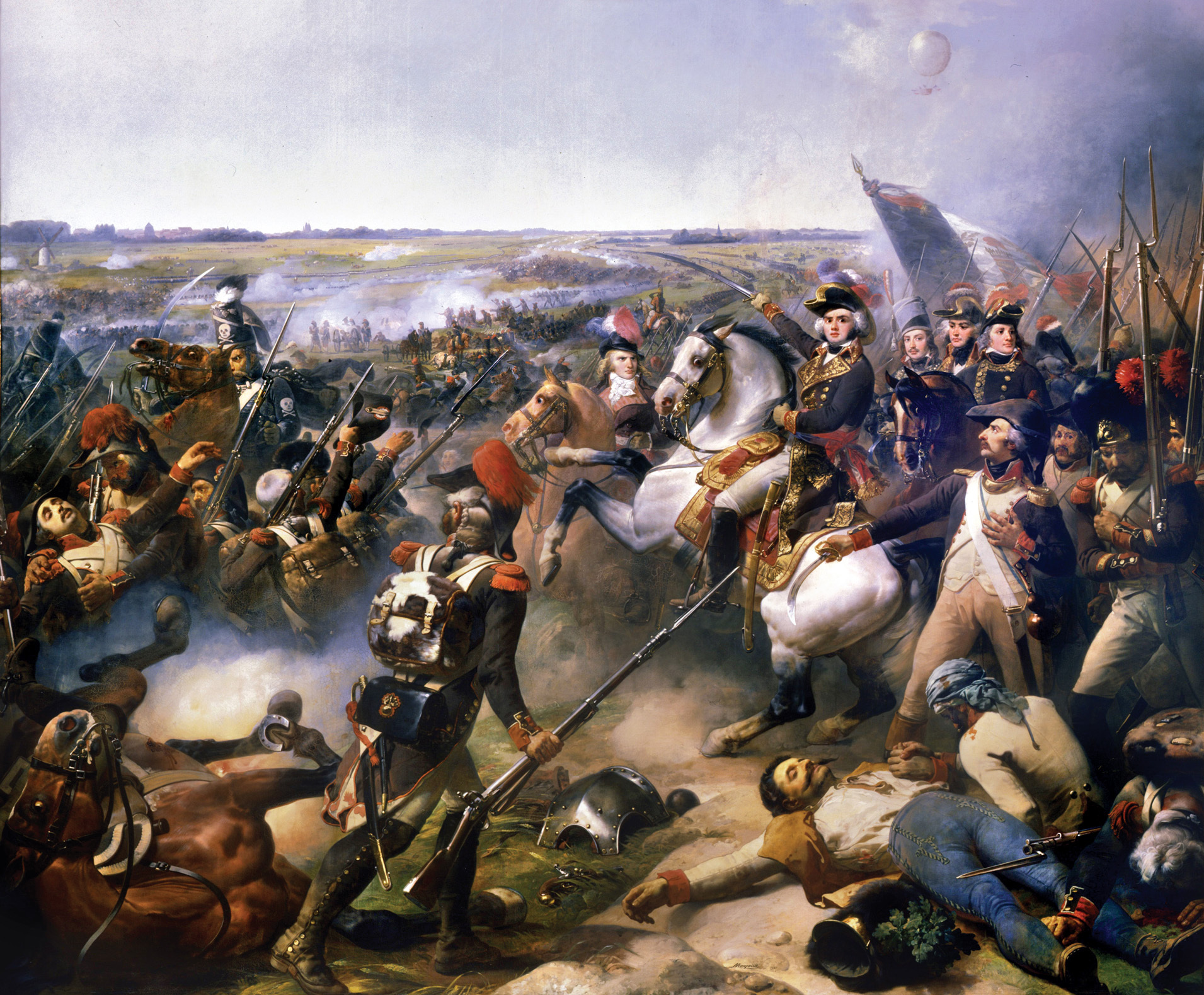
The French Revolutionary Army defeated the combined armies of Austrians, Dutch and British at Fleurus in June 1794.

The new-born Republic followed up on this success with a series of victories in Belgium and the Rhineland in the fall of 1792. The French armies defeated the Austrians at the Battle of Jemappes on 6 November, and had soon taken over most of the Austrian Netherlands. This brought them into conflict with Britain and the Dutch Republic, which wished to preserve the independence of the southern Netherlands from France. After the king's execution in January 1793, these powers, along with Spain and most other European states, joined the war against France. Almost immediately, French forces faced defeat on many fronts, and were driven out of their newly conquered territories in the spring of 1793. At the same time, the republican regime was forced to deal with rebellions against its authority in much of western and southern France. But the allies failed to take advantage of French disunity, and by the autumn of 1793 the republican regime had defeated most of the internal rebellions and halted the allied advance into France itself.

The stalemate was broken in the summer of 1794 with dramatic French victories. They defeated the allied army at the Battle of Fleurus, leading to a full Allied withdrawal from the Austrian Netherlands. They followed up by a campaign which swept the allies to the east bank of the Rhine and left the French, by the beginning of 1795, conquering the Dutch Republic itself. The House of Orange was expelled and replaced by the Batavian Republic, a French satellite state. These victories led to the collapse of the coalition against France. Prussia, having effectively abandoned the coalition in the fall of 1794, made peace with revolutionary France at Basel in April 1795, and soon thereafter Spain, too, made peace with France. Of the major powers, only Britain and Austria remained at war with France.

=== Colonial uprisings ===
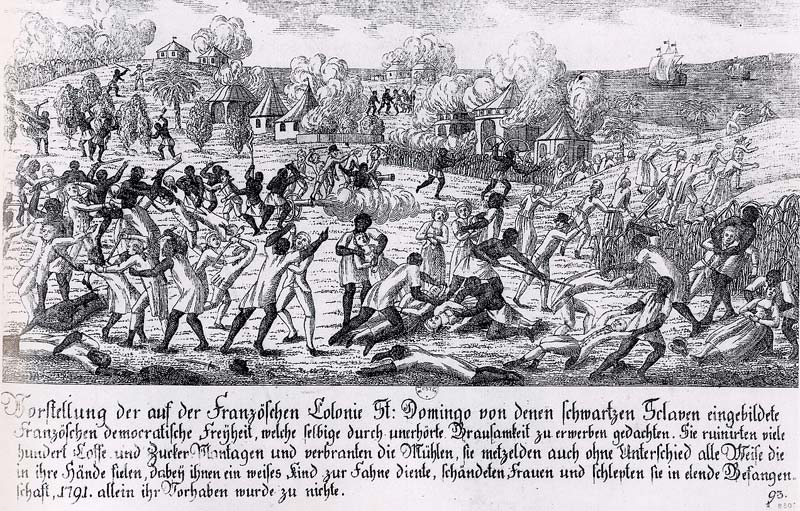
Slave revolt in Saint Domingue

Although the French Revolution had a dramatic impact in numerous areas of Europe, the French colonies felt a particular influence. As the Martinican author Aimé Césaire put it, "there was in each French colony a specific revolution, that occurred on the occasion of the French Revolution, in tune with it." The Haitian Revolution (Saint Domingue) became a central example of slave uprisings in French colonies.

=== Napoleonic Wars ===
Napoleon Bonaparte was one of the world's most dominant soldiers and statesmen, leading France to great victories over numerous European enemies. Despite modest origins he made himself an Emperor and restructured much of European diplomacy, politics and law, until he was forced to abdicate in 1814. His 100-day comeback in 1815 failed at the Battle of Waterloo, and he died in exile on a remote island, remembered as a great hero by many Frenchmen and as a great villain by British and other enemies.

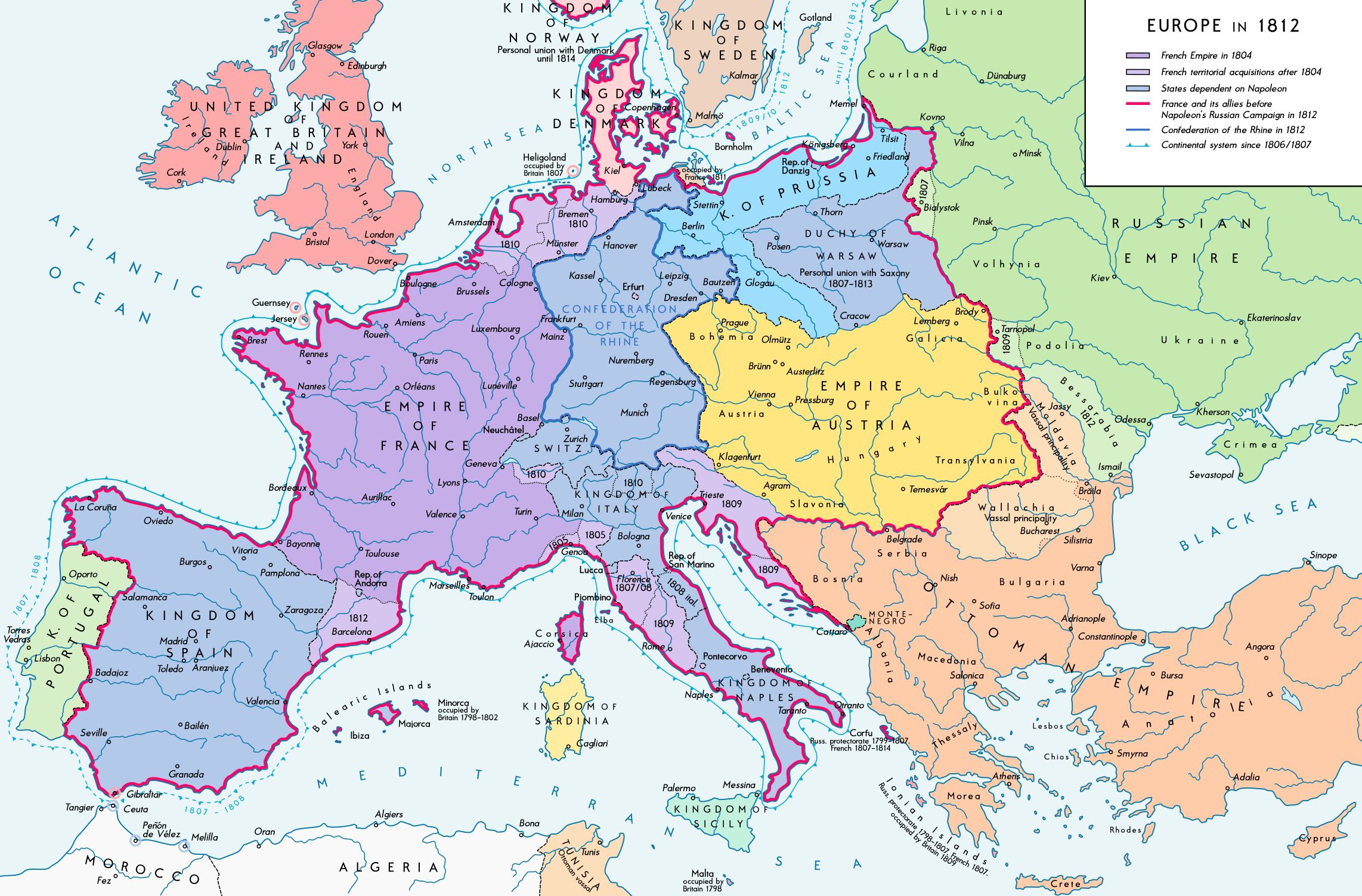
Europe in 1812 after several French victories

Napoleon, despite his youth, was France's most successful general in the Revolutionary wars, having conquered large parts of Italy and forced the Austrians to sue for peace. In the Coup of 18 Brumaire (9 November 1799), he overthrew the feeble government, replacing it with the Consulate, which he dominated. He gained popularity in France by restoring the Church, keeping taxes low, centralizing power in Paris, and winning glory on the battlefield. In 1804 he crowned himself Emperor. In 1805, Napoleon planned to invade Britain, but a renewed British alliance with Russia and Austria (Third Coalition), forced him to turn his attention towards the continent, while at the same time the French fleet was demolished by the British at the Battle of Trafalgar, ending any plan to invade Britain. On 2 December 1805, Napoleon defeated a numerically superior Austro-Russian army at Austerlitz, forcing Austria's withdrawal from the coalition (see Treaty of Pressburg) and dissolving the Holy Roman Empire. In 1806, a Fourth Coalition was set up. On 14 October Napoleon defeated the Prussians at the Battle of Jena–Auerstedt, marched through Germany and defeated the Russians on 14 June 1807 at Friedland. The Treaties of Tilsit divided Europe between France and Russia and created the Duchy of Warsaw.

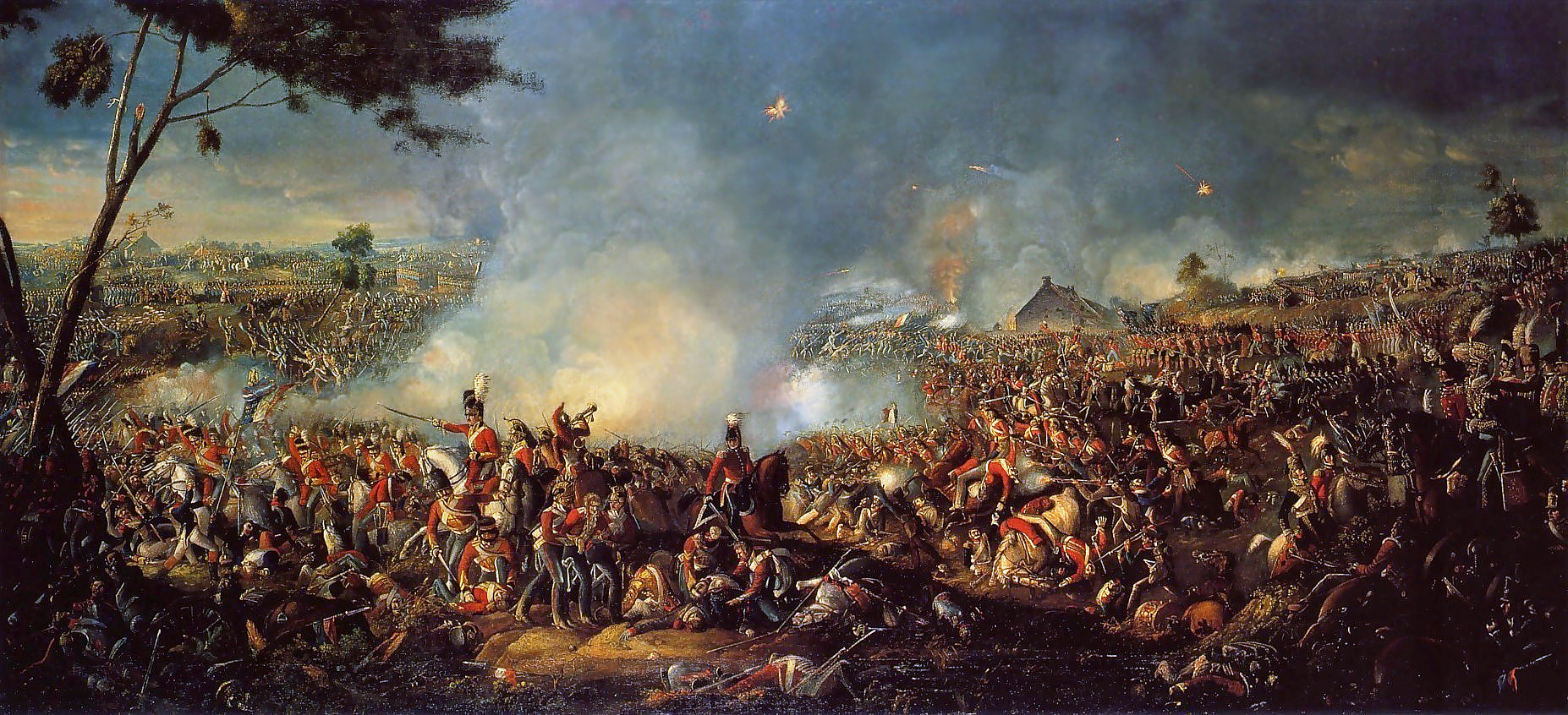
Painting of the Battle of Waterloo, where Napoleon was finally defeated in 1815

On 12 June 1812, Napoleon invaded Russia with a Grande Armée of nearly 700,000 troops. After the measured victories at Smolensk and Borodino Napoleon occupied Moscow, only to find it burned by the retreating Russian army. He was forced to withdraw. On the march back his army was harassed by Cossacks, and suffered disease and starvation. Only 20,000 of his men survived the campaign. By 1813 the tide had begun to turn from Napoleon. Having been defeated by a seven-nation army at the Battle of Leipzig in October 1813, he was forced to abdicate after the Six Days' Campaign and the occupation of Paris. Under the Treaty of Fontainebleau he was exiled to the island of Elba. He returned to France on 1 March 1815 (see Hundred Days), raised an army, but was finally defeated by a British and Prussian force at the Battle of Waterloo on 18 June 1815 and the Bourbons returned to power.

==== Impact of the French Revolution ====
Roberts finds that the Revolutionary and Napoleonic wars, from 1793 to 1815, caused 4 million deaths (of whom 1 million were civilians); 1.4 million were French deaths.

Outside France the Revolution had a major impact. Its ideas became widespread. Andrew Roberts argues that Napoleon was responsible for key ideas of the modern world, so that, "meritocracy, equality before the law, property rights, religious toleration, modern secular education, sound finances, and so on-were protected, consolidated, codified, and geographically extended by Napoleon during his 16 years of power."

Furthermore, the French armies in the 1790s and 1800s directly overthrew feudal remains in much of western Europe. They liberalised property laws, ended seigneurial dues, abolished the guild of merchants and craftsmen to facilitate entrepreneurship, legalised of divorce, closed the Jewish ghettos and made Jews equal to everyone else. The Inquisition ended as did the Holy Roman Empire. The power of church courts and religious authority was sharply reduced and equality under the law was proclaimed for all men.

In foreign affairs, the French Army down to 1812 was quite successful. Roberts says that Napoleon fought 60 battles, losing only seven. France conquered Belgium and turned it into another province of France. It conquered the Netherlands, and made it a puppet state. It took control of the German areas on the left bank of the Rhine River and set up a puppet regime. It conquered Switzerland and most of Italy, setting up a series of puppet states. The result was glory for France, and an infusion of much needed money from the conquered lands, which also provided direct support to the French Army. However the enemies of France, led by Britain and funded by the inexhaustible British Treasury, formed a Second Coalition in 1799 (with Britain joined by Russia, the Ottoman Empire and Austria). It scored a series of victories that rolled back French successes, and trapped the French Army in Egypt. Napoleon himself slipped through the British blockade in October 1799, returning to Paris, where he overthrew the government and made himself the ruler.

Napoleon conquered most of Italy in the name of the French Revolution in 1797–1799. He consolidated old units and split up Austria's holdings. He set up a series of new republics, complete with new codes of law and abolition of old feudal privileges. Napoleon's Cisalpine Republic was centered on Milan; the Roman Republic was formed as well as the small Ligurian Republic around Genoa. The Parthenopean Republic was formed around Naples, but it lasted only five months. He later formed the Kingdom of Italy while his brother, Joseph, ruled the Kingdom of Naples. In addition, France turned the Netherlands into the Batavian Republic, and Switzerland into the Helvetic Republic. All these new countries were satellites of France, and had to pay large subsidies to Paris, as well as provide military support for Napoleon's wars. Their political and administrative systems were modernized, the metric system introduced, and trade barriers reduced. Jewish ghettos were abolished. Belgium and Piedmont became integral parts of France.

Most of the new nations were abolished and returned to prewar owners in 1814. However, Artz emphasizes the benefits the Italians gained from the French Revolution:

For nearly two decades the Italians had the excellent codes of law, a fair system of taxation, a better economic situation, and more religious and intellectual toleration than they had known for centuries.... Everywhere old physical, economic, and intellectual barriers had been thrown down and the Italians had begun to be aware of a common nationality.

Likewise in Switzerland, the long-term impact of the French Revolution has been assessed by Martin:

It proclaimed the equality of citizens before the law, equality of languages, freedom of thought and faith; it created a Swiss citizenship, basis of our modern nationality, and the separation of powers, of which the old regime had no conception; it suppressed internal tariffs and other economic restraints; it unified weights and measures, reformed civil and penal law, authorized mixed marriages (between Catholics and Protestants), suppressed torture and improved justice; it developed education and public works.

The greatest impact came of course in France itself. In addition to effects similar to those in Italy and Switzerland, France saw the introduction of the principle of legal equality, and the downgrading of the once powerful and rich Catholic Church to just a bureau controlled by the government. Power became centralized in Paris, with its strong bureaucracy and an army supplied by conscripting all young men. French politics were permanently polarized—new names were given, "left" and "right" for the supporters and opponents of the principles of the Revolution.

British historian Max Hastings says there is no question that as a military genius Napoleon ranks with Alexander the Great and Julius Caesar in greatness. However, in the political realm, historians debate whether Napoleon was "an enlightened despot who laid the foundations of modern Europe or, instead, a megalomaniac who wrought greater misery than any man before the coming of Hitler".

== China ==
=== Impact of the West ===
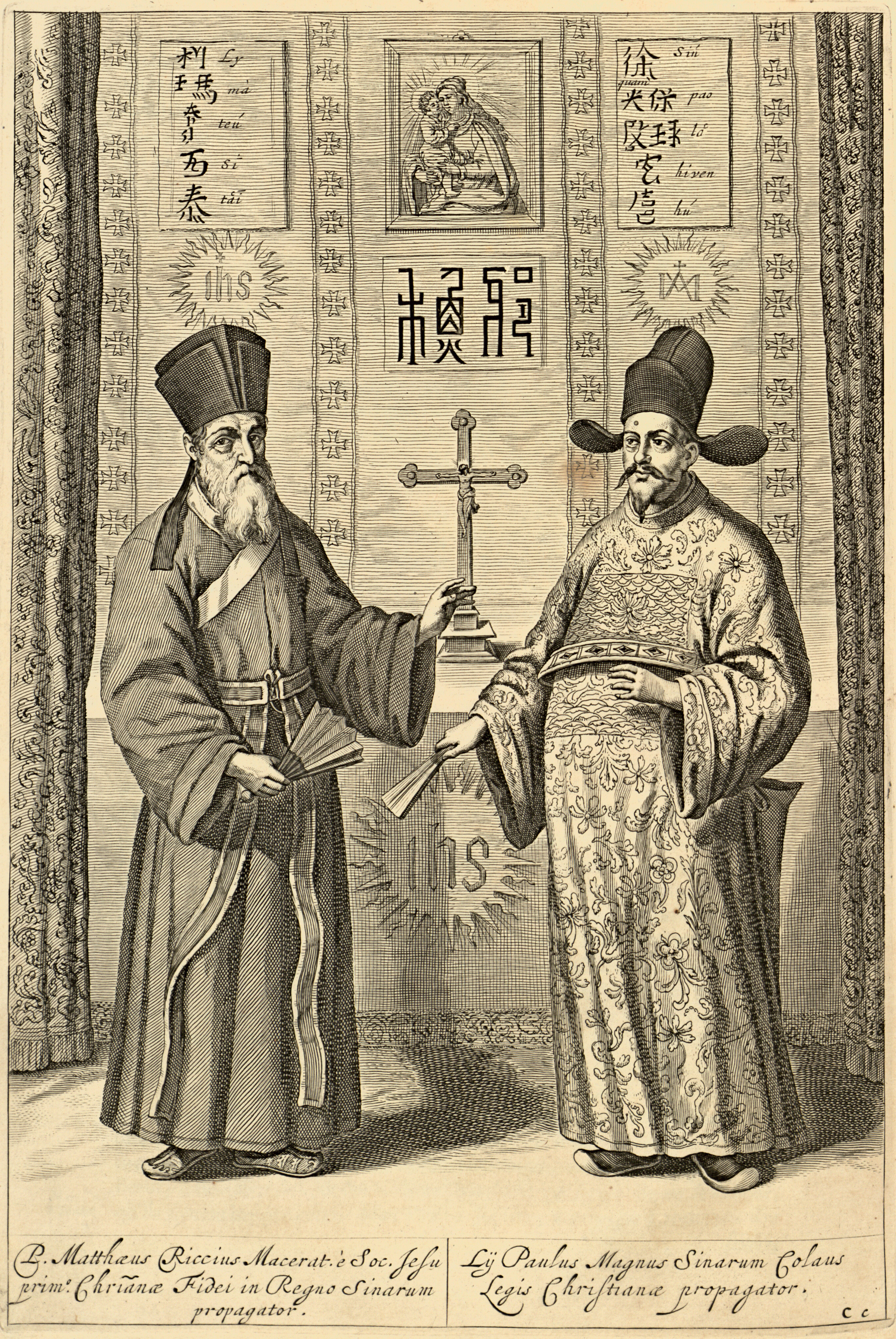
Matteo Ricci (left) and Xu Guangqi (right) in the Chinese edition of Euclid's Elements published in 1607

=== Ten Great Campaigns ===
The Manchu or Qing regime in Beijing used military force, diplomacy, and reliance on local leaders to extend its domain to western regions where the Han Chinese had not settled, but where Russian expansion was a threat. It launched Ten Great Campaigns in the mid–late 18th century. Three were launched to enlarge the area of Qing control in Central Asia: two against the Dzungars (1755–1757) and one for the pacification of Xinjiang (1758–1759). The other seven campaigns were more in the nature of police actions on frontiers already established: two wars to suppress rebels in Sichuan, another to suppress rebels in Taiwan (1787–1788), and four expeditions abroad against the Burmese (1765–1769), the Vietnamese (1788–1789), and two against the Gurkhas in Nepal. The most important and successful saw the final destruction of the Dzungar people in the 1755 Pacification of Dzungaria. The two campaigns secured the northern and western boundaries of Xinjiang. It also led to the pacification of the Islamicised, Turkic-speaking southern half of Xinjiang immediately thereafter. The Ten Great Campaigns demonstrated China's vitality on its western fringes, and in Mongolia, Tibet, and Turkestan. The main threat was that Russia would take control, but instead they were over Allied and stayed away. Treaties with Russia at Nerchinsk (1689) and Kyakhta (1727) demonstrated that diplomacy could effectively establish stable borders. The treaties allowed for a Russian Orthodox religious mission in Beijing, and a small Russian caravan trade. After 1724, in Qinghai (Eastern Tibet), China divided ethnic groups against each other and relied upon local leaders as a counterweight to the Tibetan religious leader the Dalai Lama and the Mongols. In Turkestan, they encountered a growing and expanding Muslim population. The solution was to appoint local Muslim chieftains, as governors, and allowing Islamic law to prevail. The Chinese did collect taxes on trade, and tried to keep order. The expansion to the west was the last major expansion of China.

== Indian subcontinent ==
=== Mughal Empire ===
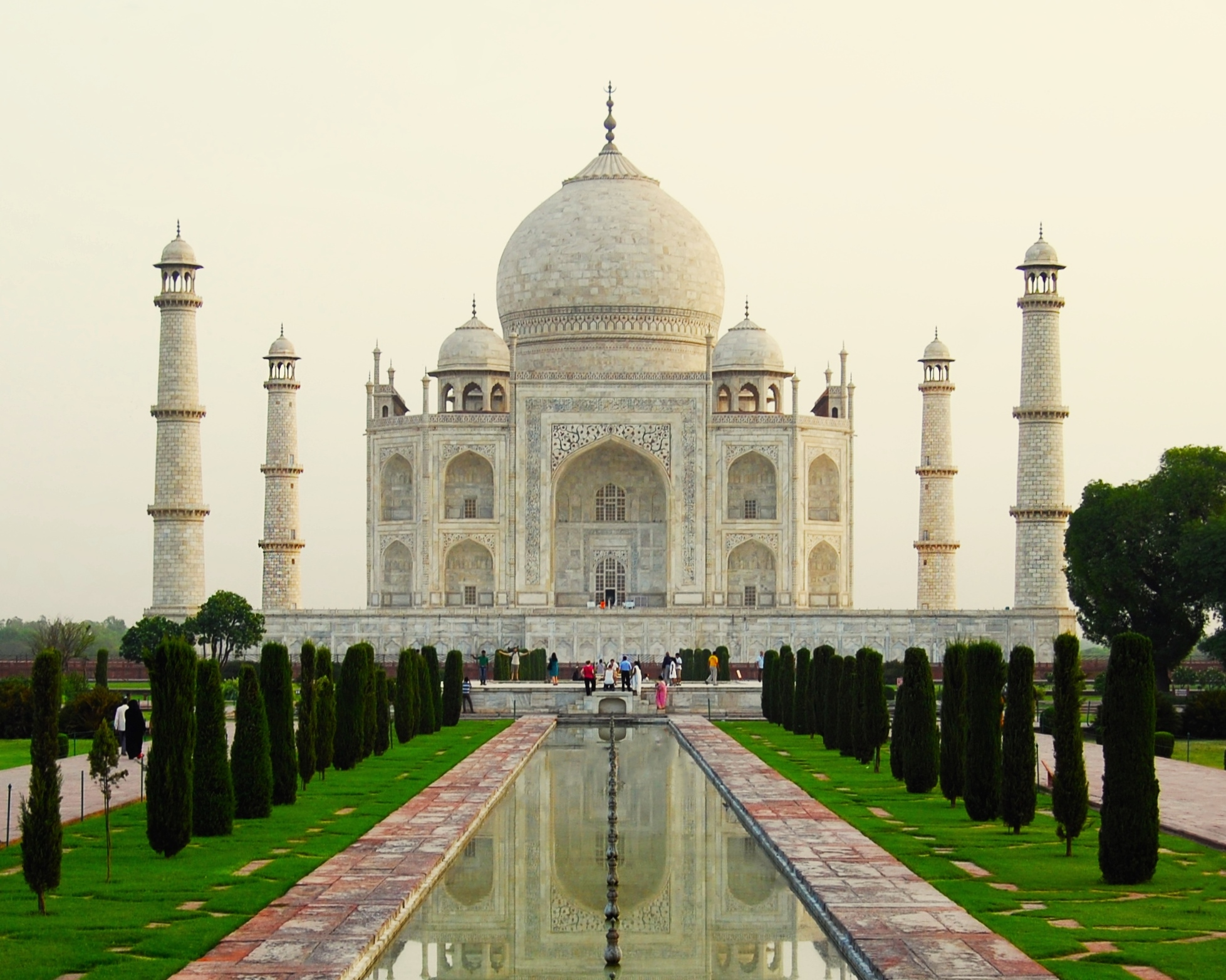
The Taj Mahal near Delhi

The Mughal Empire (1526–1720) was founded by Babur, (1483–1530) a Sunni Muslim based in Afghanistan. He used advanced weapons, artillery – and especially mobile cavalry, he captured Delhi in 1526 with only 12,000 soldiers against an enemy force of over 100,000. He continued his conquests across much of North Central India. His vigor and charismatic personality earned him strong loyalties. Akbar (ruled 1556–1605) followed. He was a charismatic and brilliant leader who organized a highly successful military, and set up a financial system to pay for his extravagances. The Mughal Empire maintained diplomatic relations with numerous local and international powers, including Uzbeks, the Safavid dynasty in Persia, the Ottoman Empire, the French East India Company and especially the English East India Company. It tolerated the establishment of trading forts along the coast by Europeans because they brought trade, and because the Europeans had far superior naval power.

The young new empire had severe weaknesses. Extravagant spending drained the treasury and forced an extremely unpopular increase in taxes. The artistic achievement remains highly impressive in the 21st century: most notably, the Taj Mahal shrine, built in 1632–1653 by tens of thousands of highly skilled artisans over two decades, using the most expensive materials, including jewels in the walls.

The ruling regime did not value cohesion or loyalty to the lineage. Instead, fratricide was the standard in politics: it was son against father, brother against brother. To get the throne heirs murdered their brothers and executed all their retinue. Ugly rumors of betrayal were easy to believe, conspiracies multiplied, loyalties wavered, and competence became less important. By 1700, Europeans had begun to take control of regional trade routes, and started to take sides in internal political factionalism. Even at its height under Akbar, the Mughal Empire was not a centralized state, but a loosely knit collection of heterogeneous principalities. Akbar was a highly efficient military commander, and instead of paying his army salaries, he gave the victorious commanders the rights ("zamindars") to collect taxes locally. They therefore became locally powerful, and did not depend on central authority. A person who converted from Hinduism to Islam had much better political and economic opportunities. Akbar was highly tolerant of the Hindus, and reduced taxes. Aurangzeb (ruled 1658–1707) was deeply ascetic, and stopped the spending on magnificent palaces and shrines. He tried to curb numerous forms of corruption, and became especially unpopular when he tried to forbid gambling, drinking and prostitution. He ended the policy of religious tolerance, and was seen as hostile by the Hindus. They were no longer allowed to build temples, and the jizya tax was reimposed on non-Muslims. Forced conversions to Islam were resumed, and non-Muslims were expelled from high office. Hindus began to revolt. Most important, he spent decades in a futile military campaign to capture the large Deccan region south of the already large empire that Akbar had built. It was very expensive in money and lives. It became harder and harder to get the tax money owed by increasingly alienated powerful zamindars whose ancestors had been given the tax-collecting role by Babur or Akbar generations ago. They no longer had close ties to the throne. The result of a weak central government was that local zamindars, land owners, tribal leaders, money-lenders and merchants were increasingly independent of the central government, and instead shifted their allegiance to the East India Company, which paid them cash subsidies. It all greatly weakened the Mughar army, and strengthened the opposition Maratha caste of Hindus who gloried in their militaristic skills and took control of large sectors by 1720. The hapless Mughal emperor became a powerless figurehead; his empire was abolished in 1857.

=== East India Company ===
The East India Company was a privately owned British commercial trading firm that exported British goods to India and adjacent areas, and imported Indian products such as tea, spices, textiles and (for the Chinese market), opium. It started with several small port facilities, called factories, and expanded to control most of the Indian subcontinent by the 1850s. It primarily used diplomacy and financial incentives, with occasional use of military force. By 1803, at the height of its rule in India, it had a large private army. The company eventually came to rule large areas of India with its private armies, exercising military power and assuming administrative functions. The officers were British; the soldiers were "sepoys" (Indians). Parts of the Sepoys revolted in 1857—after heavy loss of life, the British prevailed. The British government abolished the East India Company and set up the British Raj, which ruled most of India directly, and the rest indirectly through semi-autonomous princely states.

== See also ==
- Austro-Prussian rivalry
- International relations (1814–1919)
  - Great power
  - List of modern great powers
  - Timeline of European imperialism
  - European balance of power
- French–Habsburg rivalry
- International relations (1919–1939)
- History of Europe
  - Early modern Europe
- Foreign relations of imperial China
- History of French foreign relations
- Foreign policy of the Russian Empire
- Foreign relations of Spain
- History of the foreign relations of the United Kingdom
  - Historiography of the British Empire
  - Timeline of British diplomatic history
