= Chambers of Reunion =

French courts established by King Louis XIV

The Chambers of Reunion (Chambres des Réunions) were French courts established by King Louis XIV in the early 1680s. The purpose of these courts was to increase French territory. Louis had been expanding the borders of France in a series of wars. Territory was gained in the Treaty of Nijmegen in 1679 and the Treaty of Aix-la-Chapelle in 1668. The courts' job was to determine what dependencies, if any, had belonged to the areas incorporated into France by these treaties. In doing so, places such as Saarbrücken, Luxembourg, Zweibrücken and Strasbourg were annexed to France.

Louis based his claims on ancient, often long-forgotten, rights to the dependent territories stemming from the Middle Ages. He thus took advantage of the formal content of his alliance treaties with the German princes by claiming their land. Although there was no legal claim to it at all, Louis took Strasbourg as well as Casale. Louis also took most of what is now Luxembourg during the War of the Reunions, which was then part of the Holy Roman Empire, while it was distracted by an ongoing war with the Ottoman Empire.

The conflicts caused by the Reunion policy ultimately led to the Truce of Ratisbon in which Louis was allowed to keep most gains, partly because of the distraction of other countries and partly by bribes, including payoffs to the German princes and Charles II of England.

Louis's hostile policy antagonized much of the rest of Europe, resulting in the War of the League of Augsburg (the Nine Years' War) in 1688. The war ended in 1697 with the signing of the Treaty of Ryswick in which Louis agreed to restore much of the territory that had been "reunited" with France as a result of the Chambers of Reunion.

== See also ==
- Early modern France
- Territorial evolution of France#The wars of the 17th_century
