= War of the Reunions =

War (1683–84) between France and a European coalition

- Part of the wars of Louis XIV
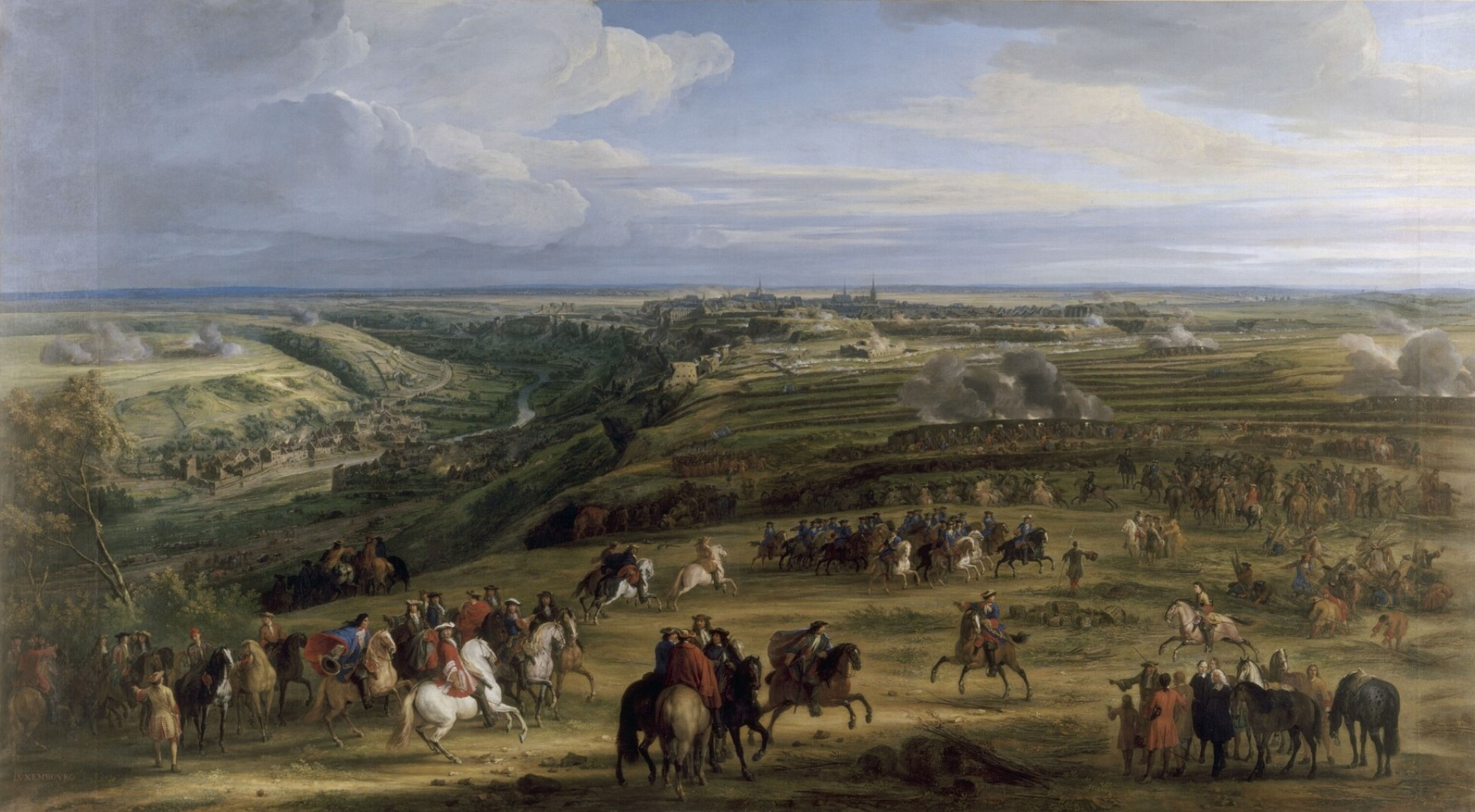
- The Siege of Luxembourg
Date	26 October 1683 – 15 August 1684
Location	Spanish Netherlands, Trier, Genoa, Catalonia and Mediterranean Sea
Result	Truce of Ratisbon
Territorial changes	Spain cedes Luxembourg to France; Holy Roman Empire cedes Strasbourg to France

Belligerents
(Kingdom of France) France	(Spain) Spain; Co-belligerent: (Habsburg monarchy) Holy Roman Empire (Republic of Genoa) Genoa

Commanders and leaders
(Kingdom of France) Louis XIV (Kingdom of France) Duc de Humières (Kingdom of France) François de Créquy (Kingdom of France) de Bellefonds (Kingdom of France) Sébastien de Vauban (Kingdom of France) Abraham Duquesne	(Spain) Charles II (Spain) Marquis of Savona (Spain) Alexander von Bournonville (Spain) Ernesto de Croy

The War of the Reunions (1683–84) was a conflict between France, Spain and the Holy Roman Empire, with limited involvement by Genoa. It can be seen as a continuation of the War of Devolution (1667–1668) and the Franco-Dutch War (1672–1678), which were driven by Louis XIV's determination to establish defensible boundaries along France's northern and eastern borders.

Despite the peace established by the 1678 Treaty of Nijmegen, Louis retained a large army, an action extremely unusual in the period. In 1681, his troops seized Strasbourg and in 1682 occupied the Principality of Orange, then a possession of William of Orange. When hostilities began in 1683, French support for the Ottomans in their war with Austria allowed Louis to capture Luxembourg and consolidate his position in Alsace.

The Truce of Ratisbon that ended the conflict marked the high water mark of French territorial gains under Louis XIV. Afterwards, his opponents would recognize the need for unity in order to resist further expansion, leading to the 1689 creation of the Grand Alliance, an anti-French coalition that fought in the Nine Years' War and the War of the Spanish Succession.

== Background ==
Under the treaties of Westphalia in 1648, Aix-la-Chapelle in 1668 and Nijmegen in 1678, France acquired territories in the Rhineland and along its northern border with the Spanish Netherlands. When a town changed hands, it normally included the economic hinterland surrounding it but treaties often failed to define the boundaries of these dependent regions. Although willing to negotiate those within the Spanish Netherlands on a bilateral basis, Louis regarded acquisitions in Alsace and Lorraine as essential to securing his borders. For these areas, he set up "Chambers of Reunion" to determine whether France had been awarded all the territory owed; since those appointed to the Chambers were French lawyers, the normal result was to demand additional concessions but as these generally consisted of small towns and villages, they went unopposed.

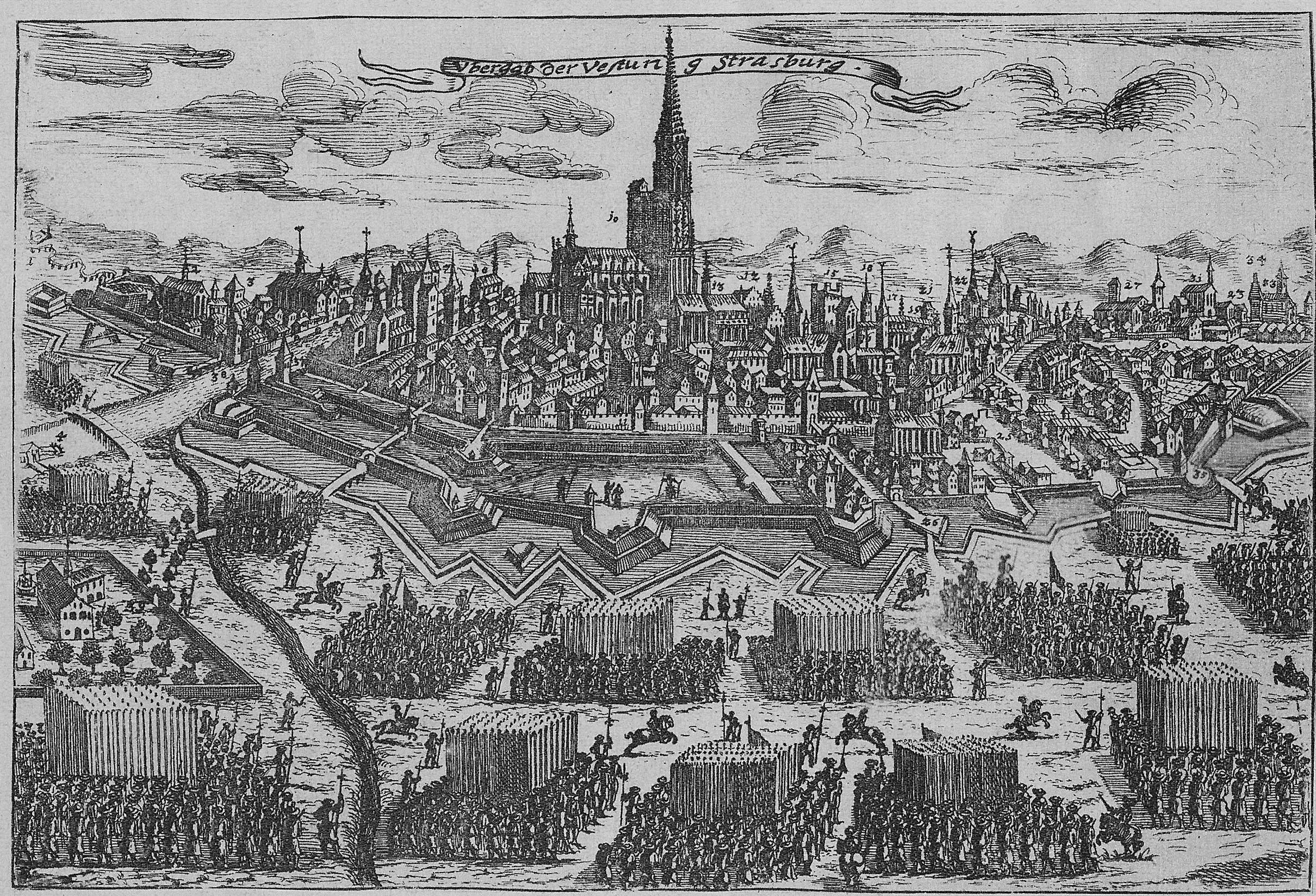
Capture of Strasbourg.

The exceptions were Strasbourg and Luxembourg, both of which remained part of the Holy Roman Empire. While France controlled much of the surrounding area, the bridge over the Rhine at Strasbourg had been used by Imperial troops to invade Alsace on three occasions during the Franco-Dutch War. In the same way, Luxembourg dominated regions annexed from the Spanish Netherlands. Louis believed that only the possession of these two could ensure the security of his newly acquired territories. Imperial troops could not respond since they were engaged in the Great Turkish War, the largest offensive ever by the Ottomans against the Empire's eastern border.

Strasbourg was occupied on 30 September 1681 and officially became part of France, although it retained a degree of economic and political autonomy until 1726. Marshal Boufflers simultaneously laid siege to Luxembourg but Louis now decided it was impolitic for him to attack another Christian kingdom while it was under attack from the Turks and in March 1682 Boufflers withdrew his troops. However, on 12 September 1683 a combined Imperial, German and Polish army defeated the Ottomans at the Battle of Vienna and forced them to retreat.

== War ==
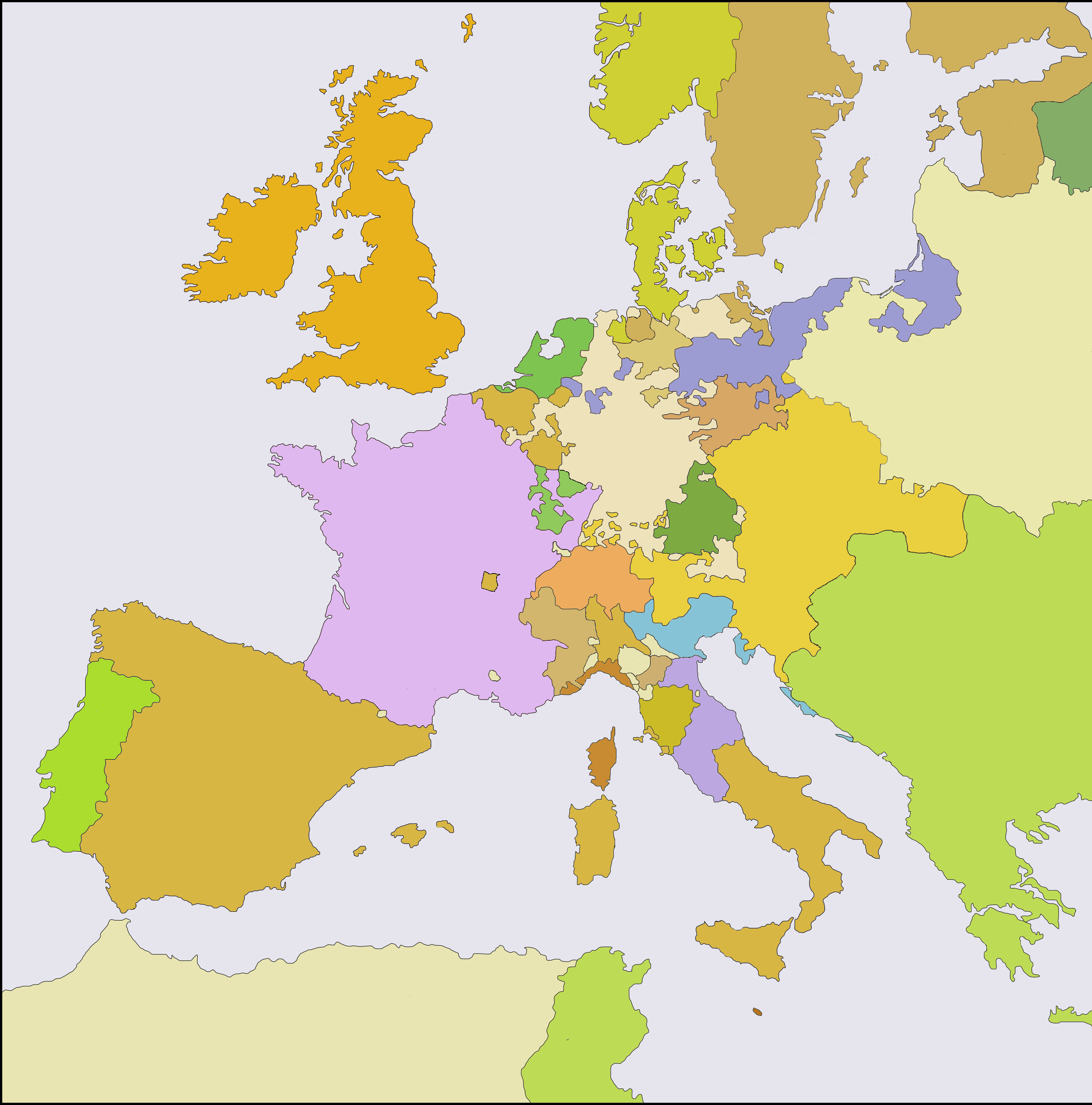
Map of western and central Europe in early 1682

After halting the Ottoman advance at Vienna, the Habsburgs were able to turn their attentions to the west. Spain declared war on France on 26 October 1683 and on the night of 3–4 November, an army under the Duke of Humières entered the Spanish Netherlands and encircled Courtrai. After the town surrendered on 6 November, he then advanced on Diksmuide, which surrendered without a fight on 10th. Between 22 and 26 December, a second force under Marshal François de Créquy bombarded Luxembourg with 3,000 to 4,000 mortar shells but with winter approaching and the city refusing to yield, he withdrew.

Louis renewed the siege of Luxembourg in April 1684, assisted by his technical expert on siege warfare, Sébastien le Prestre de Vauban. Its 2,500 defenders surrendered on 3 June, although fighting continued elsewhere until the Truce of Ratisbon on 15 August 1684. France retained territory taken during the war, including Strasbourg and Luxembourg, and subsequent actions were intended to make the truce permanent.

Despite its limited scope and length, the war is remembered as being especially bloody, since Louis XIV deliberately employed violence as state policy, with the aim of pressuring enemy officials to surrender. Louvois ordered Montal to burn 20 villages near Charleroi because the Spanish previously destroyed two barns on the outskirts of two French villages, and insisted that not a single house should remain standing.

A separate but related conflict took place in the Republic of Genoa, whose bankers and financial houses such as the Centurioni, Palavicini and Vivaldi families had longstanding relationships with Spain, and had been lending money to its government since the 16th century. During the recent war, they allowed the Spanish to recruit mercenaries from Genoese territory and use their port building some galleys for the Spanish navy. As a punishment, on 5 May a French fleet commanded by Admiral Abraham Duquesne left the Mediterranean naval base of Toulon and began a bombardment of Genoa on 17 May 1684, which lasted for the next 12 days apart from a short truce for negotiations. By the time it concluded on 28 May, two thirds of the city had been destroyed.

== Peace and treaty ==
While Louis refused to send aid to the Empire and even dispatched secret envoys to encourage the Ottomans, contemporary accounts indicate that it would be unseemly for him to continue fighting the Empire on its western border. Thus, Louis agreed to the Truce of Ratisbon, guaranteeing 20 years of peace between France and the Empire and asked his first cousin, Charles II of England, to arbitrate the disputed border claims.

== Aftermath ==
The war, like its immediate continental predecessors, failed to resolve the festering conflict between the French Bourbon dynasty and the Spanish and Austrian branches of the Habsburg dynasty. The brief but brutal conflict was one of the precursors to the lengthier Nine Years' War.

== Sources ==
- Kinross, Lord (1977). The Ottoman Centuries: The Rise and Fall of the Turkish Empire. Sander Kitabevi and Jonathan Cape. ISBN 978-0688080938.
- Lynn, John (1999). The Wars of Louis XIV, 1667–1714 (Modern Wars in Perspective). Longman. ISBN 978-0582056299.
- Lynn, John (1993). "How War Fed War: The Tax of Violence and Contributions during the Grand Siècle". The Journal of Modern History. 65 (2): 286–310. doi:10.1086/244639. S2CID 153454205.
- Lynn, John (2002). The French Wars 1667–1714. Osprey Publishing.
- Smith, Rhea Marsh (1965). Spain: A Modern History. University of Michigan Press. OCLC 733708764.
- Thomas, Hugh (2003). Rivers of Gold: The Rise of the Spanish Empire, from Columbus to Magellan. (Random House.
- Wolf, John (1962). The Emergence of European Civilization. Joanna Cotler Books. ISBN 978-0060471804.
