= De la Vallée =

De la Vallée is a French surname. Notable people with the surname include:

== People ==
- De la Vallée family, family of Swedish architects
- Charles Jean de la Vallée Poussin (1866–1962), Belgian mathematician
- Charles-Louis de la Vallée Poussin (1827–1903), Belgian geologist and mineralogist
- Étienne de La Vallée Poussin (1735–1802), French history painter
- Gerard de la Vallée (1596–1667), Flemish painter
- Jean de la Vallée (1620–1696), French-Swedish architect
- Louis de La Vallée-Poussin (1869–1938), Belgian indologist
- Marin de la Vallée (1560–1655), French architect
- Melchior de la Vallée (died 1631), French priest
- Simon de la Vallée (1590–1642), French-Swedish architect

== See also ==
- Vallée
- Delavallée
