= Poussin (disambiguation) =

Nicolas Poussin (1594-1665) was a French painter.

Poussin may also refer to:

- Poussin (chicken)

== People with the surname ==
- Gaëtan Poussin (born 1999), French goalkeeper
- Gérald Poussin (born 1946), Swiss artist
- Gaspard Poussin (1615-1675), name sometimes given to the painter Gaspard Dughet, pupil and brother-in-law of Nicolas Poussin

== See also ==
- Charles Jean de la Vallée-Poussin (1866-1962), Belgian mathematician
- Charles-Louis-Joseph-Xavier de la Vallée-Poussin (1827–1903), Belgian geologist and mineralogist, father of Charles Jean
- Théodore Poussin, a comic book series
