= Remigius van Leemput =

Flemish portrait painter, copyist, collector and art dealer

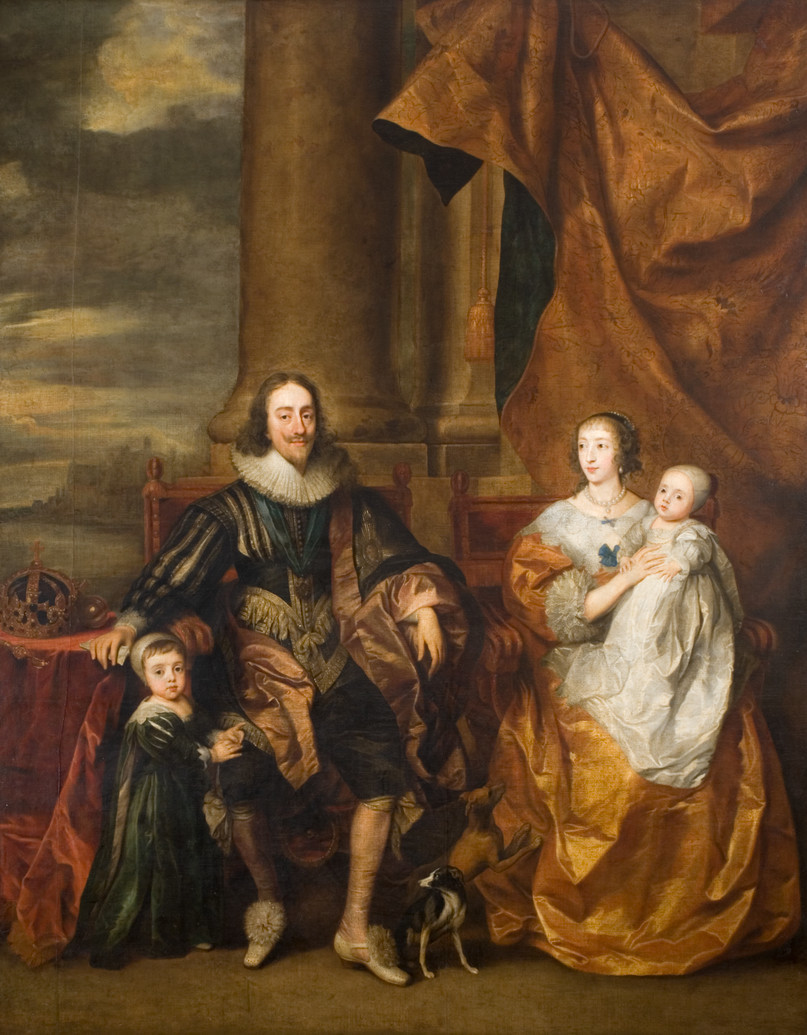
Charles I and His Family (after Anthony van Dyck)

Remigius van Leemput, known in England simply as Remee, (19 December 1607 – 4 November 1675, aged 67) was a Flemish portrait painter, copyist, collector and art dealer mainly active in England. Together with another Flemish master painter from Antwerp, George Geldorp, he was the key collaborator of Anthony van Dyck during van Dyck's final stay in London.

== Life ==
Van Leemput was born in Antwerp where he was baptized on 18 December 1607. He trained in Antwerp where he was enrolled in the local Guild of Saint Luke as a pupil of Frans van Lanckvelt the Elder in the guild year commencing on 18 September 1618 and ending on 18 September 1619. Van Lanckvelt was a relatively obscure painter who was also the master of Theodoor Rombouts and Peeter Sion. He was admitted as a master in the Antwerp Guild in the guild year commencing on 18 September 1628 and ending on 18 September 1629.

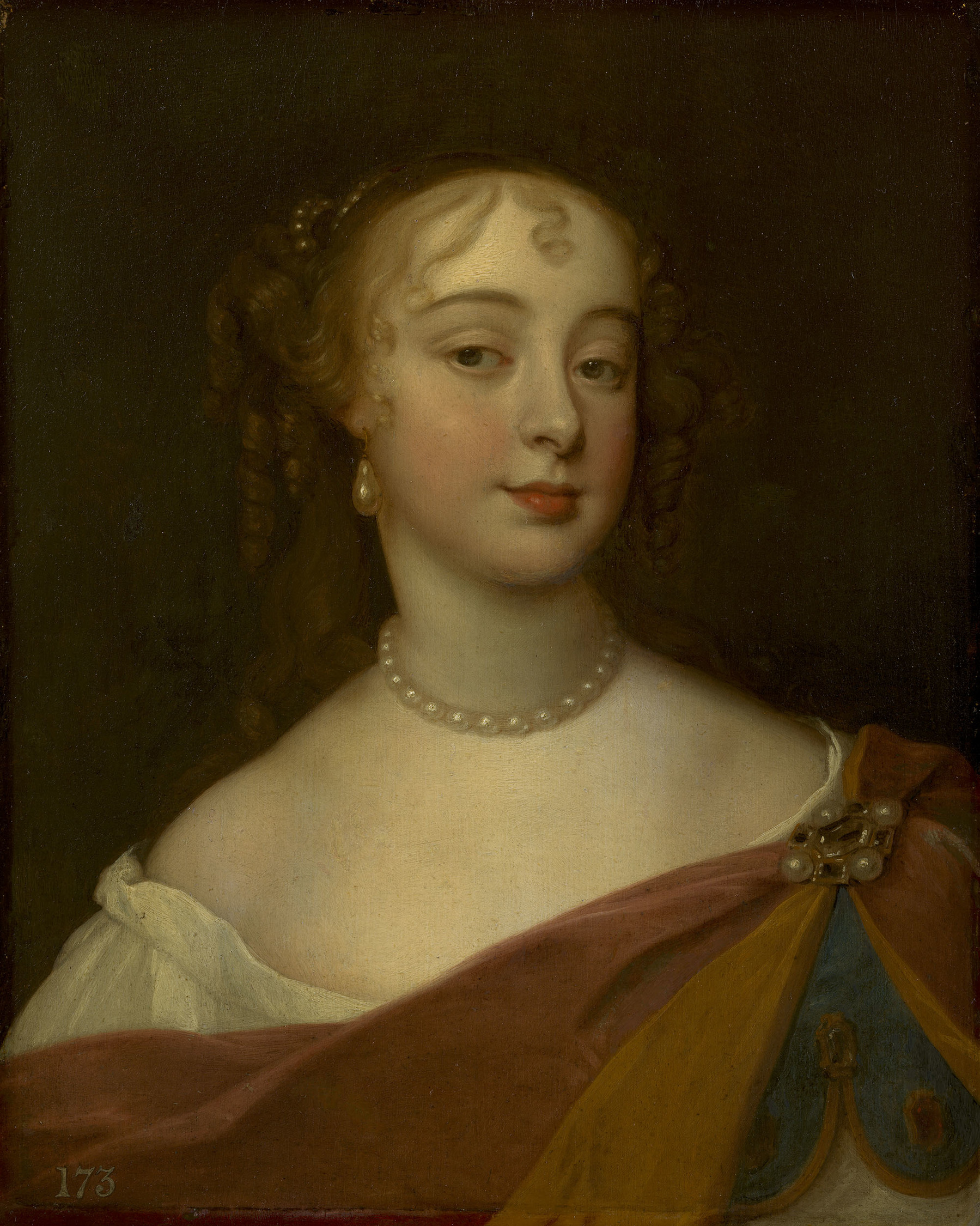
Portrait of Jane Needham, Mrs Myddleton

He married in Antwerp on 2 March 1630 to Anna van Bavelgem. Their son Johannes Remigius (known as Giovanni Remigio) (c. 1638/40-1695) later became a copyist in Rome while another son Anton (Antonio) (c. 1642 - 1667) worked as a painter in Rome. Their daughter, Mary, also became a painter and married Thomas, son of Robert Streeter, the Serjeant-Painter.

He is believed to have moved to London around 1632. There is speculation that he followed van Dyck to England in 1632. He and another Flemish painter George Geldorp who was like him a master in the Antwerp Guild of Saint Luke were very close associates of Anthony van Dyck in London. Geldorp is believed to have been more involved on the commercial side by assisting van Dyck with the sale of copies of his works and frames. Van Leemput was likely more involved in the production of copies of van Dyck's portrait paintings including full-size and reduced copies. He appears to have been the most prolific copyist of van Dyck's works. King Charles I commissioned a copy of van Dyck's Portrait of Charles I and Henrietta Maria with their two eldest children, Prince Charles and Princess Mary from van Leemput through his Lord Chamberlain, Philip Herbert, 4th Earl of Pembroke. He later also copied works of other painters such as Peter Lely. Van Leemput is said to have claimed that he could copy Lely better than Lely could himself. He may have been an assistant of Lely at some point. After the death of his first wife, he married in London on an unknown date Anna Maria Geldorp, daughter of his associate Georg Geldorp.

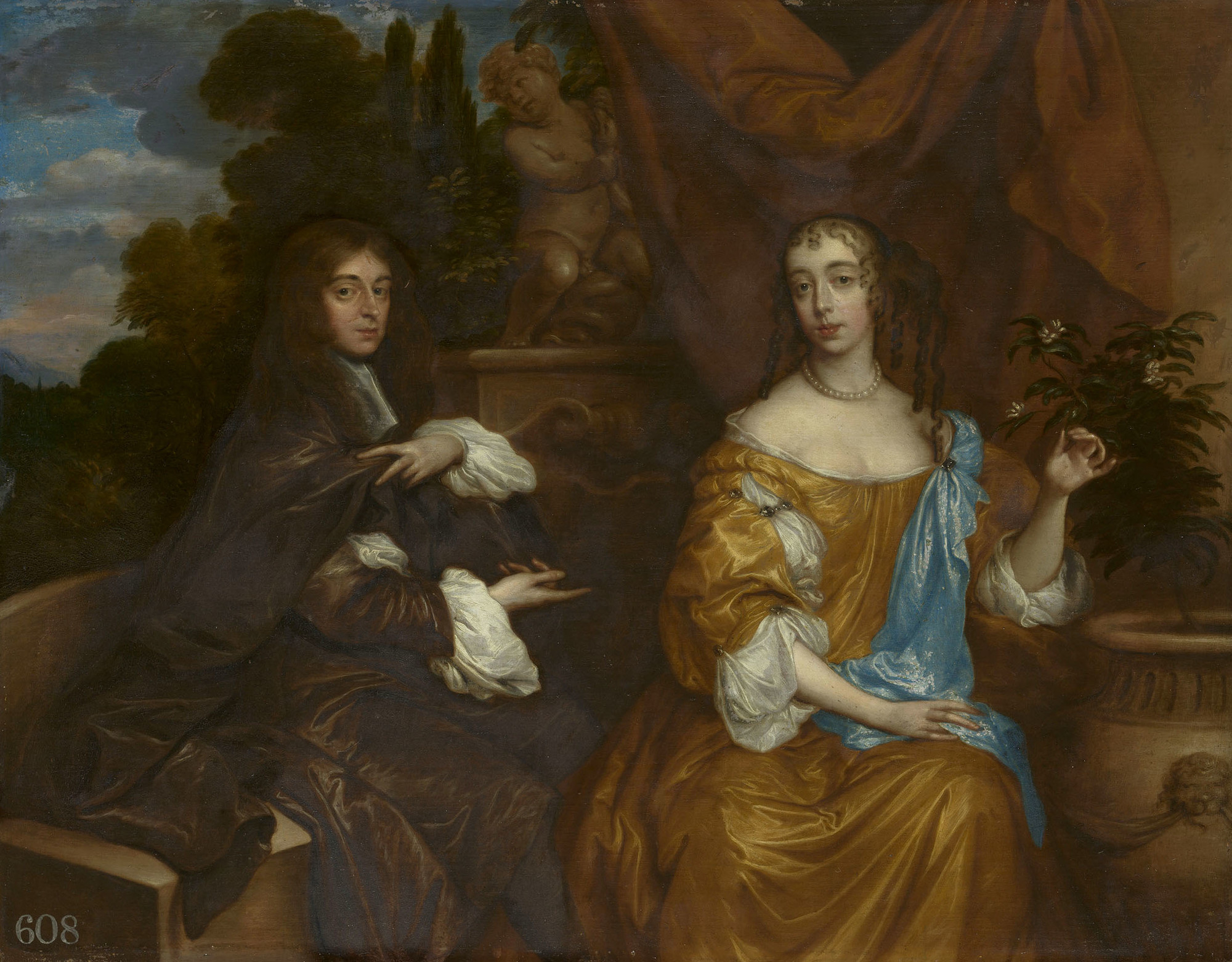
Henry Hyde, second Earl of Clarendon, with his first wife, Theodosia Capel

Van Leemput gained a prominent position in the London art world. He became an art dealer and a major collector of paintings and drawings. After the execution of Charles I of England in 1649, his art collection was broken up and sold off in order to repay the debtors of the former king. Van Leemput was active as a buyer of artworks sold off from the royal collection. He acquired 35 paintings and sculptures from the sale of the collection over a period of six months. He purchased works from Titian, Giorgione, Correggio and Andrea del Sarto. He was able to acquire the famous equestrian portrait by van Dyck of Charles I with M. de St Antoine. He tried to sell the painting in Antwerp but was unsuccessful because his asking price of 1,500 guineas was too high. It is possible that he was in fact trying to sell a copy of the portrait he had made himself. After the Restoration in 1660, the painting was still with him. It was recovered from him for Charles II through legal proceedings.

His son Giovanni Remigio later became a copyist in Rome, and his daughter Mary also became an artist and married Thomas Streater, the brother of the artist Robert Streater.

Remigius van Leemput died in London on 4 November 1675 and was buried on 9 November 1675 at St. Paul's, Covent Garden. His extensive collection of works of art was sold at Somerset House on 14 May 1677.

== Work ==
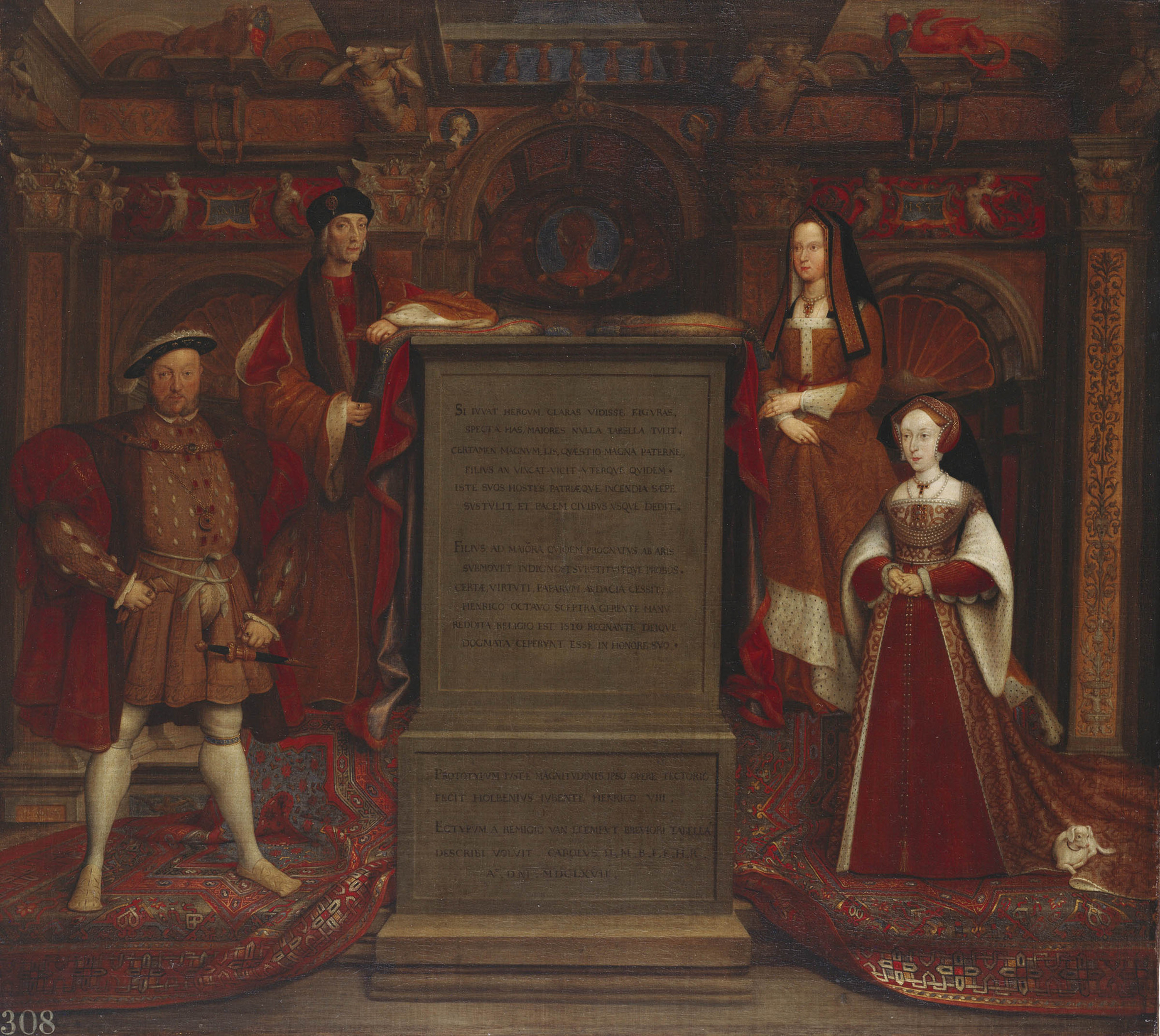
Copy of painting by Hans Holbein the Younger, UK Royal Collection

Remigius van Leemput is known for his original works as well as for his small-scale copies after van Dyck, Lely and others. He made a series of portraits of 14 "Beauties" after van Dyck, Lely and Samuel Cooper. The series are bust portraits based on (often full-length) portraits by these other painters. They were recorded in the Bathing Room at Windsor Castle in 1710, 1720 and 1733. The series remained at Windsor Castle throughout the 18th Century and 13 of them reappeared in the Queen's Bedchamber in 1790 to 1819 and are now in the Royal Collection. They are painted on panel and range in size from 23 to 39 centimetres by 18 to 31 centimetres. He also made a copy of Lely's double portrait of Henry Hyde, Viscount Cornbury and Theodosia, Viscountess Cornbury.

In 1667 Charles II commissioned van Leemput to make a small copy of the wall painting by Hans Holbein the Younger representing Henry VII, Elizabeth of York, Henry VIII, and Jane Seymour at the Palace of Whitehall in London. Van Leemput received a fee of £150 for the copy. Van Leemput painted another copy of the mural in 1669 (Petworth House, Petworth, West Sussex, England). The two copies are the only records of Holbein's entire composition, destroyed by fire in 1698 after a maid left her washing to dry before an open fire. Holbein's original draft cartoon for the left half of the composition is in the National Portrait Gallery, London.

=== Portraits ===
Barbara Villers Dutchess of Cleveland

Portrait of a lady c. 1640-1675
