= Peter Van de Velde =

Peter Van de Velde may refer to:

- Pedro Campaña (1503–1586), Flemish painter
- Peter van de Velde (1634–after 1723), Flemish marine painter
