= Delavallée =

Delavallée is a French surname. Notable people with the surname include:

- Henri Delavallée (1862-1943), French painter
- Martin Delavallée (born 2004), Belgian footballer

== See also ==
- De la Vallée
