= De la Vallée family =

The de la Vallée family is a family of Swedish architects of French origin who was ennobled in Sweden.

Their ancestor is the Parisian architect Marin de la Vallée.

== Members of this family ==
- Marin de la Vallée, an architect in Paris, 16th century.
- Simon de la Vallée, Marin's son, born about 1590 in Paris, died November 28, 1642, was a Swedish-French architect.
- Jean de la Vallée, Simon's son, born in 1624 in France, died March 9, 1696, in Stockholm, Sweden, was an architect, French by birth, but who lived and worked in Sweden
- Christoffer de la Vallée, son of Jean, born in 1661 in Stockholm, died in 1700 in Narva, Swedish architect and engineer.

== Sources ==
- Tord O:son Nordberg, De la Vallée: en arkitektfamilj i Frankrike, Holland och Sverige, Stockholm, Almqvist & Wiksell, 1970.
