= Poussin proof =

In number theory, a branch of mathematics, the Poussin proof is the proof of an identity related to the fractional part of a ratio.

In 1838, Peter Gustav Lejeune Dirichlet proved an approximate formula for the average number of divisors of all the numbers from 1 to n:

$$\frac{\sum_{k=1}^n d(k)}{n} \approx \ln n + 2\gamma - 1,$$

where d represents the divisor function, and γ represents the Euler-Mascheroni constant.

In 1898, Charles Jean de la Vallée-Poussin proved that if a large number n is divided by all the primes up to n, then the average fraction by which the quotient falls short of the next whole number is γ:

$$\frac{\sum_{p \leq n}\left \{ \frac{n}{p} \right \}}{\pi(n)} \approx1- \gamma,$$

where {x} represents the fractional part of x, and π represents the prime-counting function. For example, if we divide 29 by 2, we get 14.5, which falls short of 15 by 0.5.
