= Gerard de la Vallée =

Flemish painter

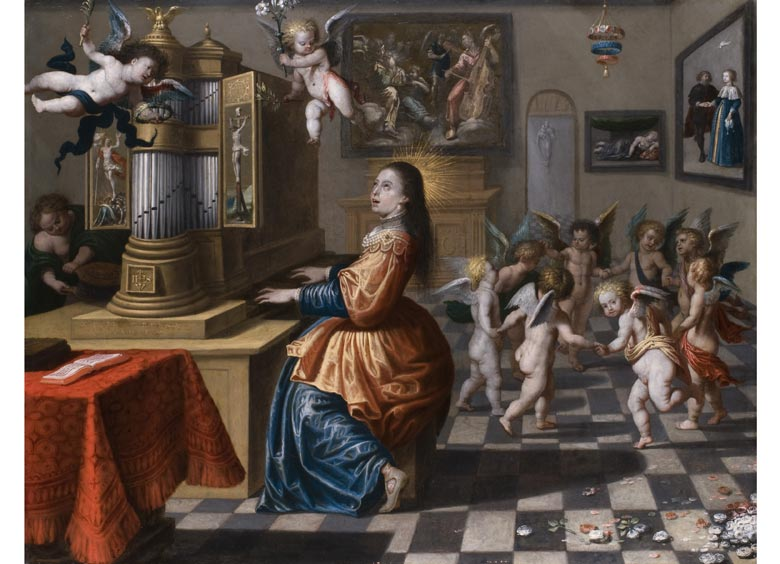
St Cecilia

Gerard de la Vallée (1596/1597 – after 1667) was a Flemish painter of landscapes and history paintings. His work was inspired by the great Flemish masters and mainly produced for the export market.

== Life ==
Little is known with certainty about the life of Gerard de la Vallée. The artist is probably identical with Gerard van den Dale, who was born in Mechelen in 1596 or 1597. He may also have been born in Antwerp. He is recorded in Mechelen on 3 July 1620. He was active in Paris from 1620 to 1625. In 1625 he is again recorded in Mechelen where he produced a painting for the Baroque church called the Onze-Lieve-Vrouw-over-de-Dijlekerk.

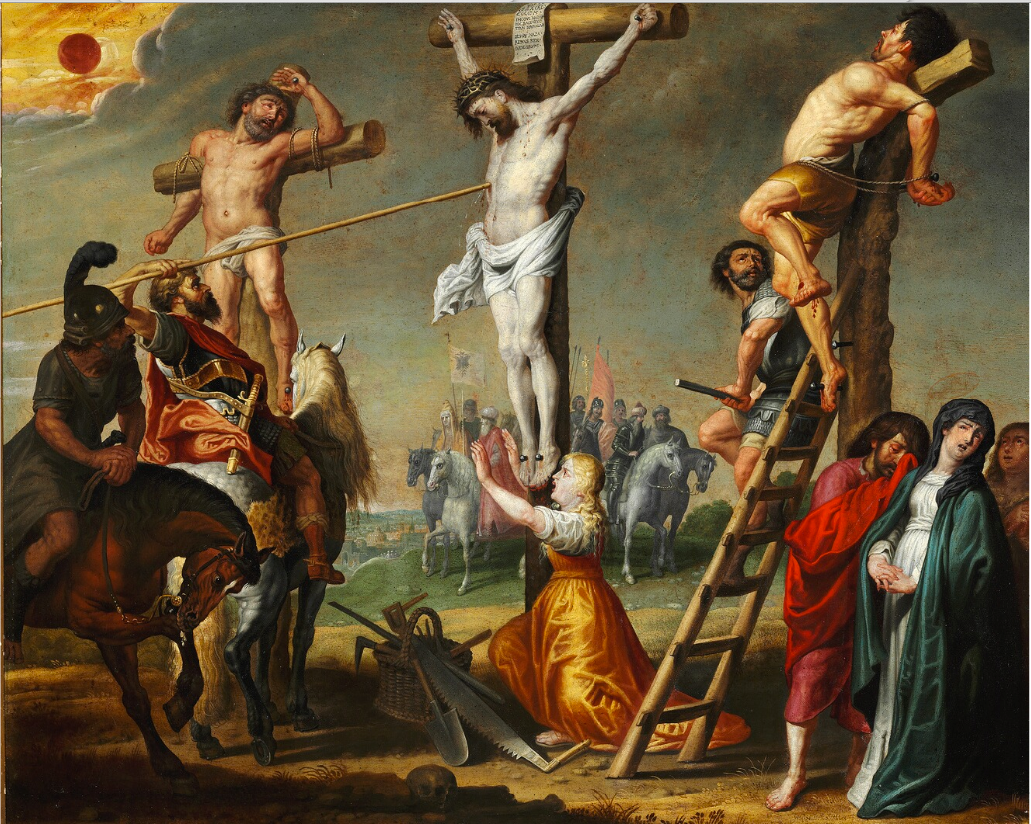
Longinus piercing Christ's side with a spear

In the guild year 1626-1627 he was documented in Antwerp when he registered as a master in the local Guild of Saint Luke under the name Geeraert de la Vallee. A record dated 1636 of the artist acting as a witness for Guillam Forchondt and N. Lemmens is evidence that he was still in Antwerp at the time. He likely remained in the city until 1656. De la Vallee worked for the Forchondt workshop, which was one of the most important exporters of Flemish art to all corners of Europe and to South America. Many of the works produced in the Forchondt workshop, including those of Gerard de la Vallée, used copper as the support. This made it easier to export them from Antwerp to Seville where Forchondt had a trading post. From Seville the artworks where shipped through Cádiz to Vera Cruz (Mexico) where they were sold to local convents.

The place and time of his death are not known. It is believed he died after 1667 and before 1687.

== Work ==
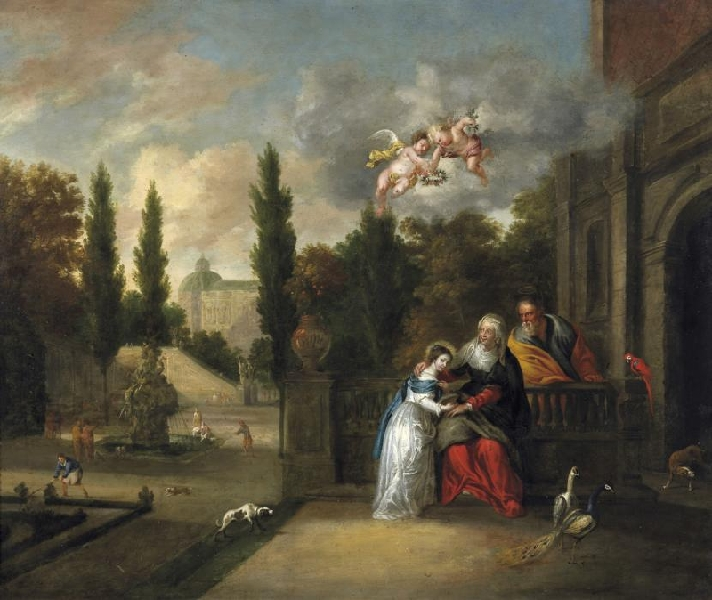
Mary as a temple virgin

Gerard de la Vallée was a landscape and history painter. His landscapes show the influence of Abraham Govaerts and of Jan Brueghel the Elder. A series of signed works by the artist is preserved in Bogotá.

Gerard de la Vallée's works are often derived from, or inspired by, the works of the great masters of the Antwerp school. For instance in his Ecce Homo (At Jan de Maere), the figure of the Christ is inspired by Anthony van Dyck’s Ecce Homo in the Barber Institute of Fine Arts in Birmingham, England. The mining of images of other masters to create new works for the export market was a hallmark of the Forchondt workshop and is also evident in de la Vallée's work. Another example is seen in the St Cecilia (At Hampel Kunstauktionen (Munchen) 4 July 2008, lot 223 as by Peeter Sion). The dancing cupids in this work appear to be based on the work King David’s Song of Praise to God by Peter de Witte (also known as Peter Candid) (a version in the Frans Hals Museum).

He collaborated with other painters. Collaborations with the figure painter Pieter van Avont are documented. An example is the Wooded Landscape with the Virgin, Christ Child and Saint John (At Lempertz on 21 May 2016, Cologne, Lot 1256).
