= Ekolsund Castle =

Manor house in Sweden

- Enköping Municipality, Sweden
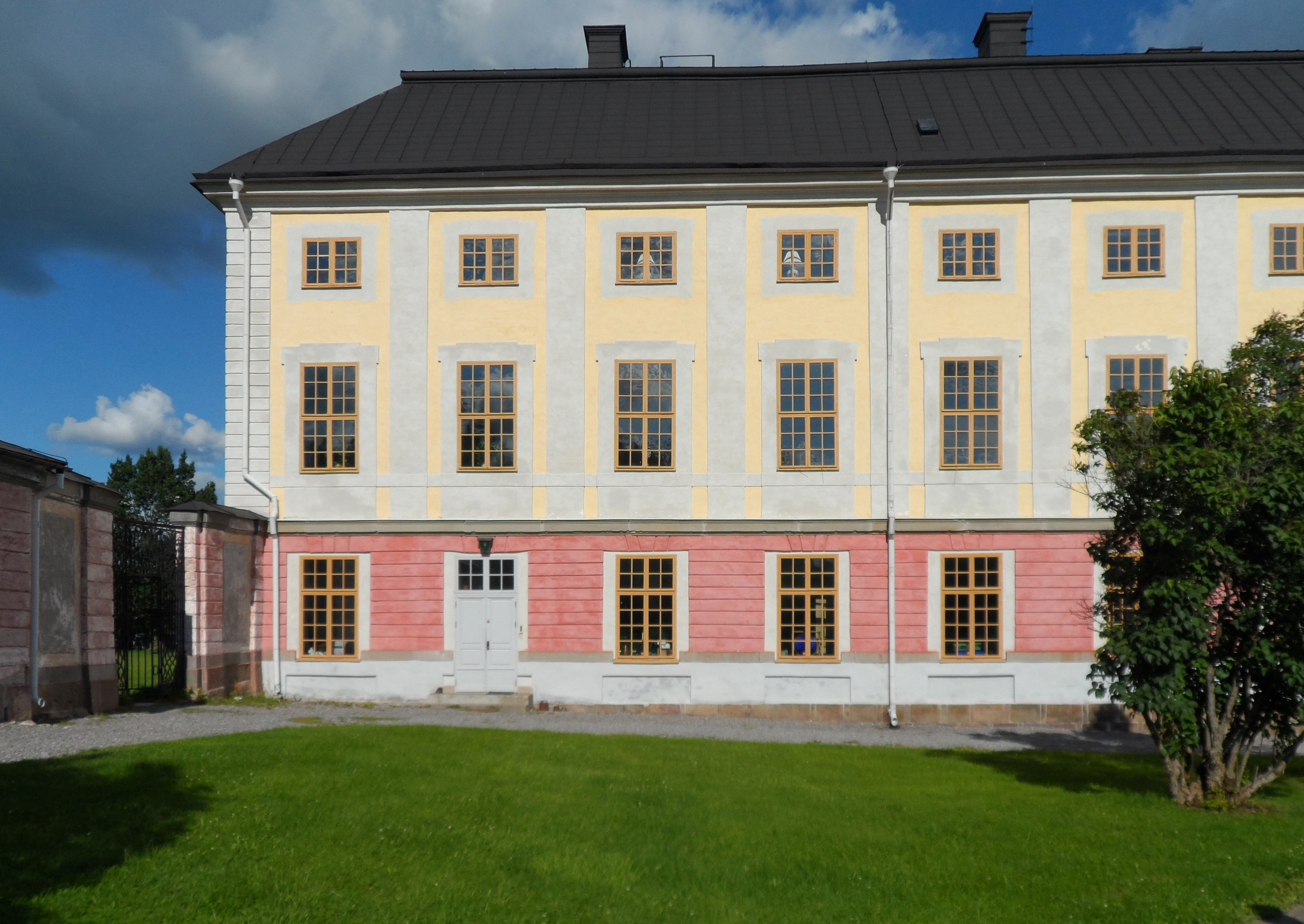

Ekolsund Castle is a manor house situated at Enköping Municipality in Uppsala County, Sweden. It is a former royal château, a well-preserved baroque building with 18th-century character.

== History ==
An estate has been known since the 14th century. In the 15th century, it was owned by Bengt Jönsson (Oxenstierna). After having been acquired by the Crown in 1542, it was used by the royal family. It was the residence of Princess Sophia of Sweden from 1578 to 1611. The current building consists of two wings designed in the second half of the 17th century by Simon de la Vallée and Nicodemus Tessin.

In 1747, it was granted to the future King Gustav III of Sweden, who often used it as his summer residence until he acquired Drottningholm Palace in 1777, especially as Crown Prince. In 1785, Gustav III sold it to the Seton family, who owned it until 1912.

In 2002, the property was acquired by Raija Axell Ohlin. It has since been used the site of Ekolsunds slott & Wärdshus.

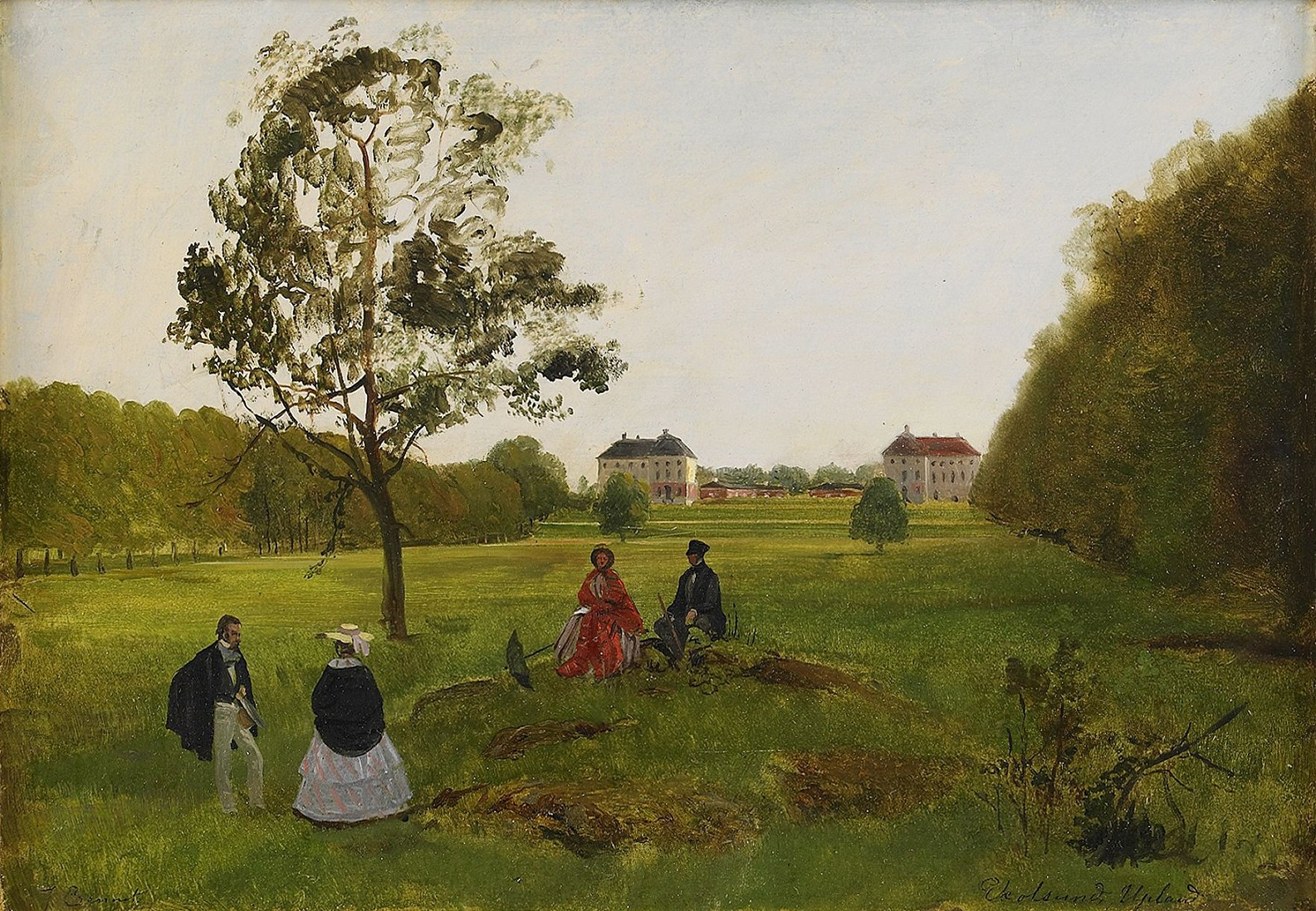
Herrskap vid Ekolsunds slott Carl Stefan Bennet (1800-1878)

== See also ==
- List of castles in Sweden

== Bibliography ==
- C. Ellehag, Fem svenska stormanshem under 1600-talet, diss. Nordiska museets handlingar, Sthlm 1994
- N. G. Wollin "Ekolsund" Den svenska trädgårdskonsten, Sv. arkitekturföreningen, Sthlm 1931
- Ekolsund i Nordisk familjebok (andra upplagan, 1907)
