= La Vallée Poussin =

The family Delavallée Poussin, also denominated as de La Vallée Poussin, is a family of the French bourgeoisie coming from Normandy in France. Settled in Belgium since the end of the 19th century, most of its members still live there today. Two members of this family were ennobled in the 20th century by the king of Belgium.

== The ennoblements ==
- in 1930: Concession of nobility with the title of baron by king Albert Ier of Belgium, to Charles Jean de la Vallée Poussin, professor of mathematical analysis at the Catholic University of Leuven.
- in 1963: Title of baron for Paul de la Vallée Poussin, President Emeritus of the Cour d'Appel, second son of the precedent by king Baudouin Ier of Belgium the 30 October 1963.

== Members of this family ==
- Charles Jean de la Vallée Poussin (1866–1962), Belgian mathematician, son of Charles-Louis-Joseph-Xavier
- Charles-Louis-Joseph-Xavier de la Vallée Poussin (1827–1903), Belgian geologist and mineralogist, father of Charles Jean
- Étienne de La Vallée Poussin (1735–1802), French history painter and creator of interior decorative schemes
- Louis de La Vallée Poussin (1869–1938), Belgian Indologist and scholar of Buddhist Studies
