= Alphonse François Renard =

Belgian geologist and petrographer

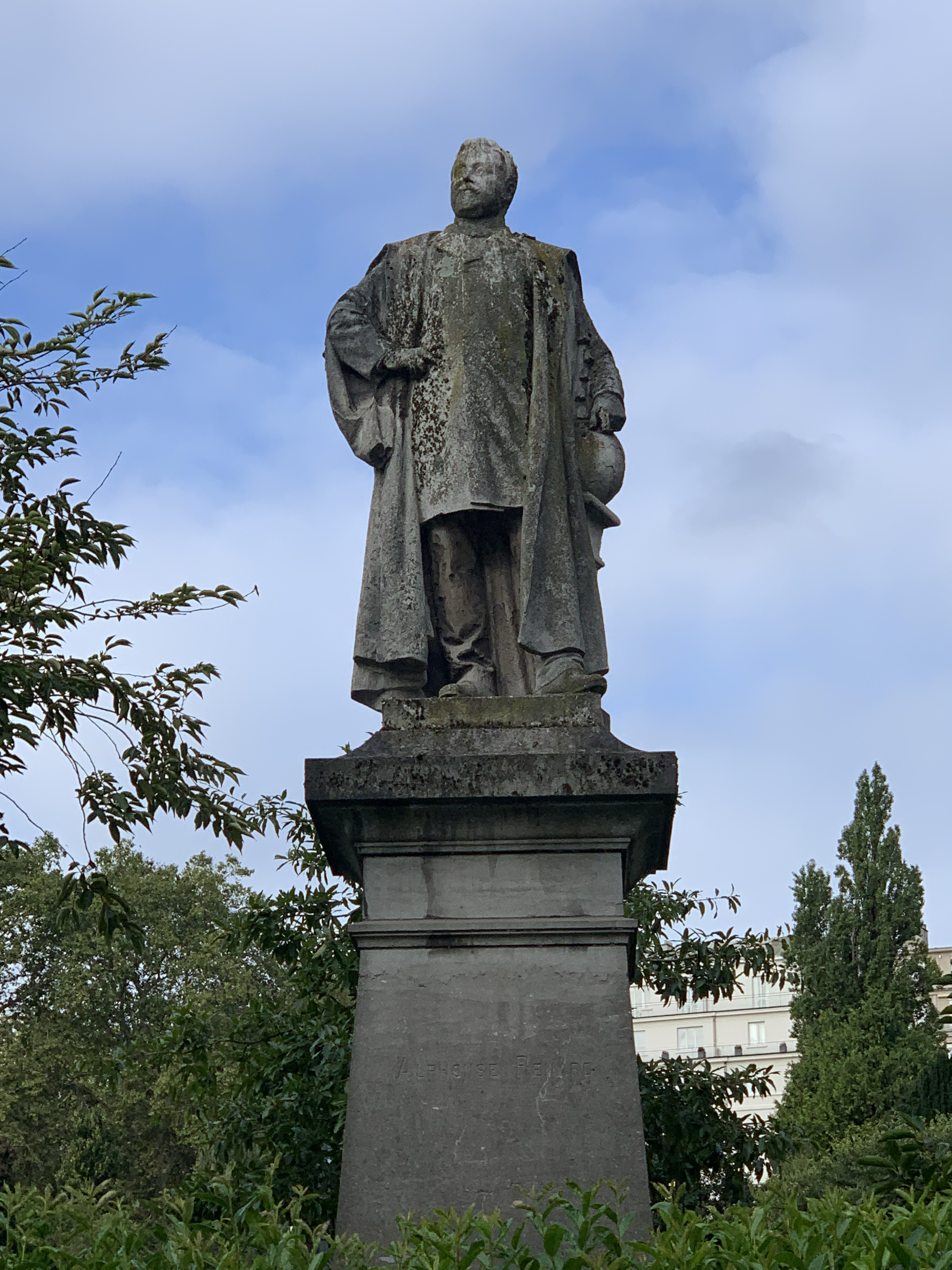
Alphonse Renard by Alphonse de Tombay (Brussels) - September 2019

Alphonse Francois Renard (27 September 1842 – 9 July 1903), Belgian geologist and petrographer, was born at Ronse, in East Flanders, on 27 September 1842. He was educated for the church of Rome, and from 1866 to 1869 he was superintendent at the college de la Paix, Namur.

In 1870 he entered the Jesuit Training College at the old abbey of Maria Laach in the Eifel, and there, while engaged in studying philosophy and science, he became interested in the geology of the district, and especially in the volcanic rocks. Thenceforth he worked at chemistry and mineralogy, and qualified himself for those petrographical researches for which he was distinguished.

In 1874 he became professor of chemistry and geology in the college of the Belgian Jesuits at Leuven, a few years later he was appointed one of the curators of the Royal Natural History Museum at Brussels, and in 1882 he relinquished his post at Louvain. In 1888 he was chosen professor of geology at the University of Ghent, and retained the post until the close of his life. Meanwhile, he had been ordained priest in 1877, and had intended to enter the Society of Jesus. He was known as the Abbé Renard; but, as remarked by Sir A. Geikie, as years passed, the longing for mental freedom grew ever stronger, until at last it overmastered all the traditions and associations of a lifetime, and he finally separated himself from the church of Rome.

His first work, written in conjunction with Charles-Louis-Joseph-Xavier de la Vallée-Poussin (1827–1904), was the Mémoire sur les caractères minéralogiques et stratigraphiques des roches dues plutoniennes de la Belgique et de l'Ardenne française (1876). In later essays and papers he dealt with the structure and mineral composition of many igneous and sedimentary rocks, and with the phenomena of metamorphism in Belgium and other countries. In acknowledgment of his work, the Bigsby Medal was awarded to him in 1885 by the Geological Society of London. Still more important were his later researches connected with the Challenger Expedition. The various rock specimens and oceanic deposits were submitted to him for examination in association with Sir John Murray, and their detailed observations were embodied in the Report on the Scientific Results of the Voyage of H.M.S. Challenger Deep Sea Deposits (1891). The more striking additions to our knowledge included the detection and description of cosmic dust, which as fine rain slowly accumulates on the ocean floor; the development of zeolitic crystals on the sea-bottom at temperatures of 32 °F (0 °C) and under; and the distribution and mode of occurrence of manganese nodules and of phosphatic and glauconite deposits on the bed of the ocean. Renard died at Brussels on 9 July 1903.

Rue Alphonse Renard, in western Ixelles, is named in his honor. In addition, the mineral renardite was named in his honor in 1928.
