= Marin de la Vallée =

French architect

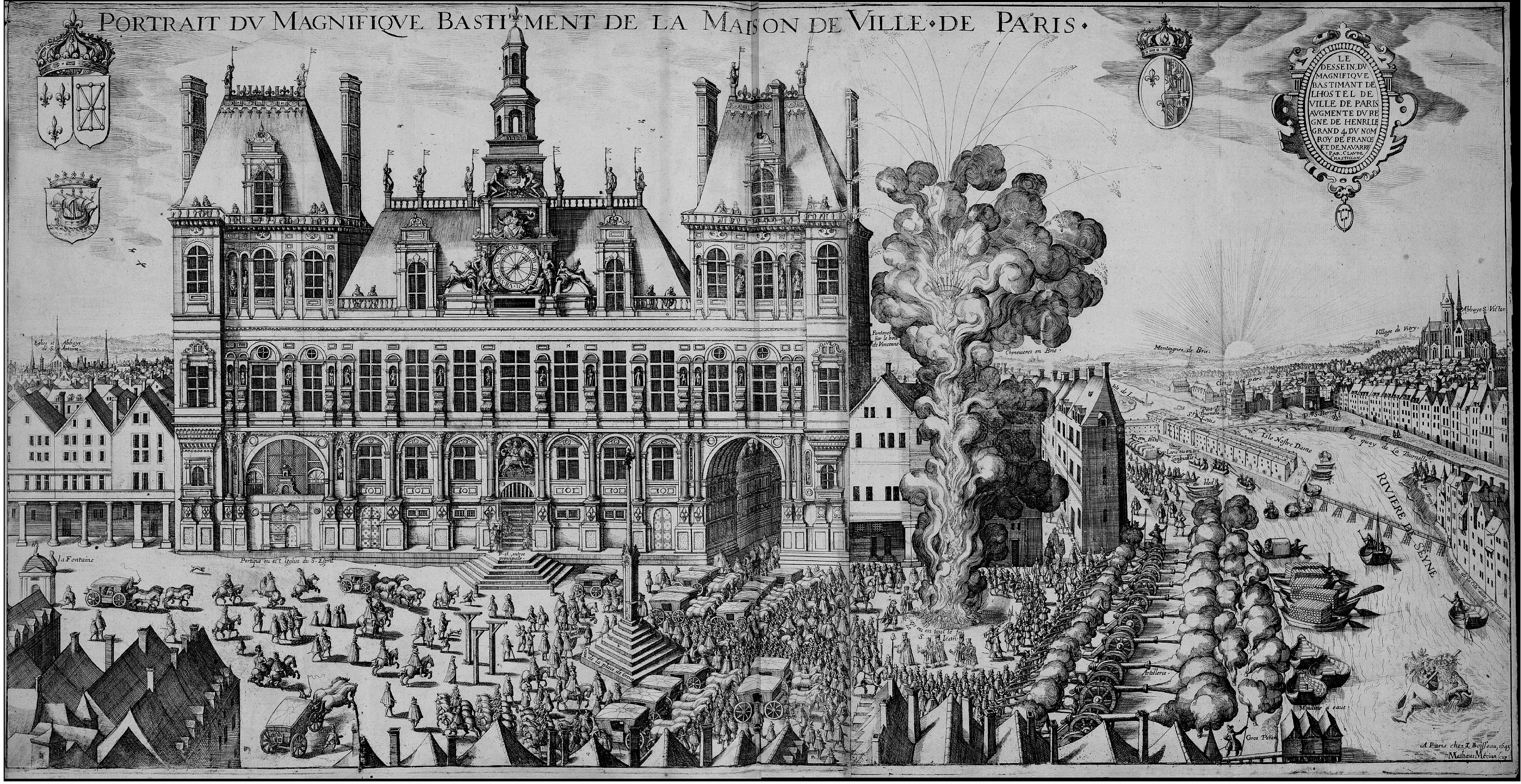
L'hôtel de ville de Paris, main work of Marin de la Vallée.

Marin de la Vallée, bourgeois de Paris, juré du Roy en l'office de massonnerye, architecte des bastiments de la Royne mère, (c. 1560 in Paris, died in May 1655 in Paris) was a 16th/17th-century French architect (master mason).

His father Jean II de la Vallée and his grandfather Jean I, also a Parisian, were already master masons in Paris.

In 1591, Marin de la Vallée married in Paris Jeanne Morissaut, who died in 1646, daughter of Pierre Morissaut and Olive Sollé.

== Legacy ==
Marin de la Vallée is better known in retrospect thanks to the international reputation of his descendants who settled in Sweden as architects to the king.

Eight adult children, four sons and four daughters are mentioned:

- Marin de la Vallée (the younger). After studying theology he became a "bachelor prebster of the Faculty of Theology" and parish priest of Pathay.
- A son, also an architect and master mason in Paris.
- A son, master mason in Paris. None of them achieved fame in their art.
- Magdelaine de la Vallée, married in 1626 Jacques Penicher, master apothecary and bourgeois of Paris.
- Anne de la Vallée, married in 1633 Jean Beguin, cloth merchant and bourgeois of Paris.
- Jeanne de la Vallée, married in 1632 Claude Boutin, master gardener, "governor of the plant gardens at said palais".
- in 1620, Marie de la Vallée married the master upholsterer Morisse De Corps.
- Simon de la Vallée, who became a renowned architect in Sweden and created the Swedish School of Architecture.

== Work ==
Marin de la Vallée was first cited in various works undertaken by the city of Paris as an expert:

- for demolition works for the extension of the Hôtel de Ville
- for bridges restoration works.

In 1624 the construction contract for the Palais du Luxembourg was withdrawn from Salomon de Brosse. On 26 March 1624, the Queen Mother's Council retroceded the contract to Marin de la Vallée for the completion of the palace. He intervened as master mason to realize the north-east wing according to the plans of Salomon de Brosse. These works were probably finished in spring 1626. On 1 April 1626, he signed a contract for the construction of the Petit Luxembourg and a wall separating the garden from the park. In June 1626, he signed a second contract for the completion of the courtyard of the palace with the paving of the terrace and its balustrade.

Among his personal constructions are:

- the château de Lasserre, located near Nérac (Lot-et-Garonne), between 1595 and 1597. This castle bears the inscription: M. DE LAVALLEE Me MASSON A PARIS. MA FAICTE. 1596.
- the reconstruction and expansion of the Hôtel de ville de Paris completed in 1625. This was his main work. On the inside of the portal of the north wing was the following inscription: "Marin de la Vallée, Parisian architect, began this great building in 1606, which had remained unfinished and imperfect for a long time, and fortunately finished it in the year of salvation 1628."
- with Jean Thiriot he intervened on the construction of the outbuildings of the Cardinal palace of Armand Jean du Plessis de Richelieu.
- He also executed temporary works: triumphal arches, porticoes, temples for the triumphal entrance to Paris of Marie de' Medici as well as her coronation.

== Bibliography ==
- Louis Dussieux, Les Artistes français à lʹétranger: recherches sur leurs travaux, 1856, p. 447.
- Tord O:son Nordberg, "Marin de la Vallée", Konsthistorisk Tidskrift, Stockholm, vol.27, N° 1-4, 1958.
- Tord O:son Nordberg, De la Vallée: en arkitektfamilj i Frankrike, Holland och Sverige, Stockholm, Almqvist & Wiksell, 1970.
- Jean-Pierre Babelon, Demeures parisiennes sous Henri IV et Louis XIII, p. 252, Éditions Hazan, Paris, 1991 ISBN 978-2-85025-251-8.

== See also ==
- De la Vallée family
- Simon de la Vallée
- Jean de la Vallée
- Christoffer de la Vallée
