= Peeter Sion =

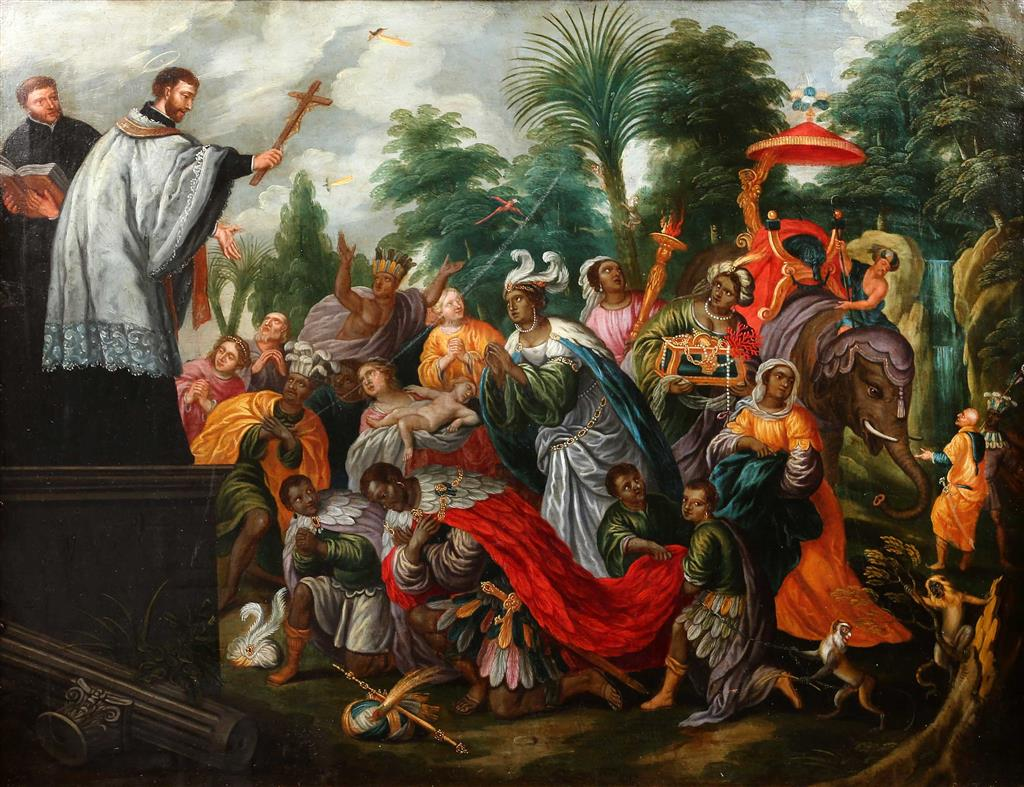
Saint Francis Xavier evangelizing the Ιndians.jpg

Peeter Sion or Peter Sion (between 1615 and 1625 – 21 August 1695) was a Flemish painter of landscapes, history paintings and genre scenes. His work was mainly produced for the export market and dealt with biblical stories. He also painted mythological subjects, genre scenes and vanitas still lifes/

== Life ==
Little is known about the life of Peeter Sion. He is believed to have been born in Antwerp between 1615 and 1625. He was registered at the Guild of Saint Luke of Antwerp as a pupil of Frans van Lanckvelt (Francos Lanckveeldt) in the guild year 1636–1637.

The artist is known to have worked in Antwerp for the Forchondt workshop, one of the most important exporters of Flemish art to all corners of Europe. Many of the works produced in the Forchondt workshop, including those of Peeter Sion, used copper as the support. This made it easier to export them from Antwerp to Spain where Forchondt had a trading post. From Seville a portion of the artworks where shipped to South America.

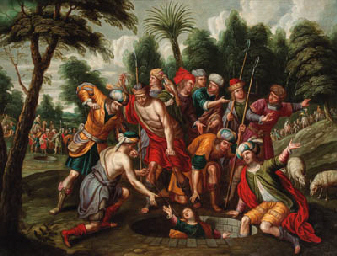
Joseph lowered into the well by his brothers

He married Catharina Coppens on 7 September 1660. The couple had 14 children, of whom one daughter called Maria-Catharina.

He died in Antwerp on 21 August 1695.

== Work ==
=== General ===
Peeter Sion was a painter of religious and mythological subjects, genre scenes and vanitas still lifes. His work is mainly located in Spain, evidence of the fact that he mainly worked for the export market. Many of the works are held in private collections in Spain although some of them are also found in the cathedrals of Valladolid and Málaga.

His style is close to the late Mannerism of Frans Francken the Younger and Guilliam Forchondt the Younger. Many of his works have a narrative character and recount stories of the Old and the New Testament. As is also common in the work of Francken, his compositions often include different sequences of the principal story in a single canvas. His work is characterized primarily by the quality of the drawing, as well as the large space occupied by the figures in the composition. Another feature of his style is the preference for white modeling, around which the shadows are traced.

=== Vanitas still lifes ===
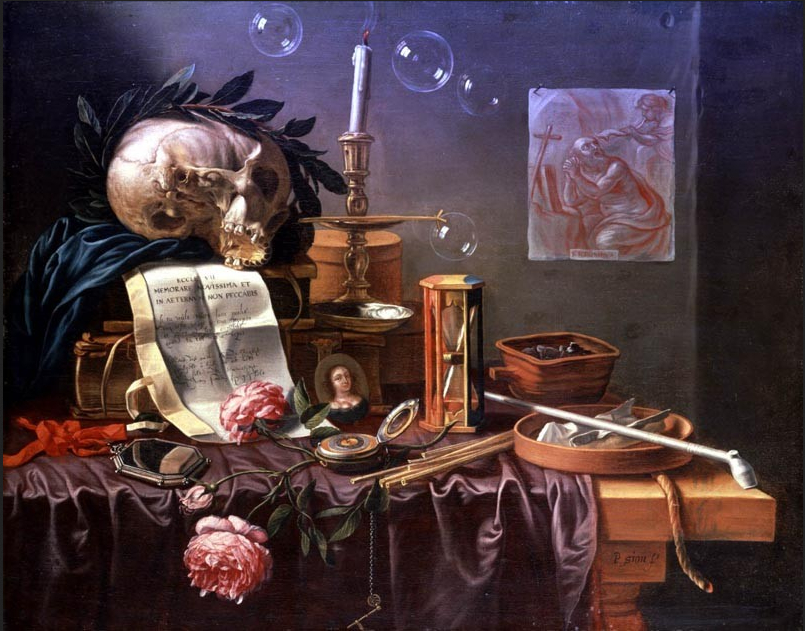
Vanitas still life with skull

Sion is also known for a few vanitas still lifes, a genre of still lifes which offers a reflection on the meaninglessness of earthly life and the transient nature of all earthly goods and pursuits. The best known of these is the Vanitas still life with skull (At art dealer Bernheimer-Colnaghi, Munich/London) where the typical symbols of vanitas appear: a skull with a laurel crown, soap bubbles, an extinguished candle, an hour glass, a watch, a portrait of a woman, a wilted flower, books, cold cinders in a pot and an empty pipe. These objects all reference the transience of things and, in particular, of earthly wealth, status and learning. On a paper resting against the books and pinned by the skull are written the words from Ecclesiastes 7:36 Memorare novissima, et in aeternum non peccabis (Whatever you do, remember that some day you must die. As long as you keep this in mind, you will never sin). A drawing on the wall depicts Saint Jerome, the Christian saint who had chosen an ascetic life over a life of indulgence in Rome. The saint is often depicted in paintings in his study with a skull.
