= Étienne de La Vallée Poussin =

French painter

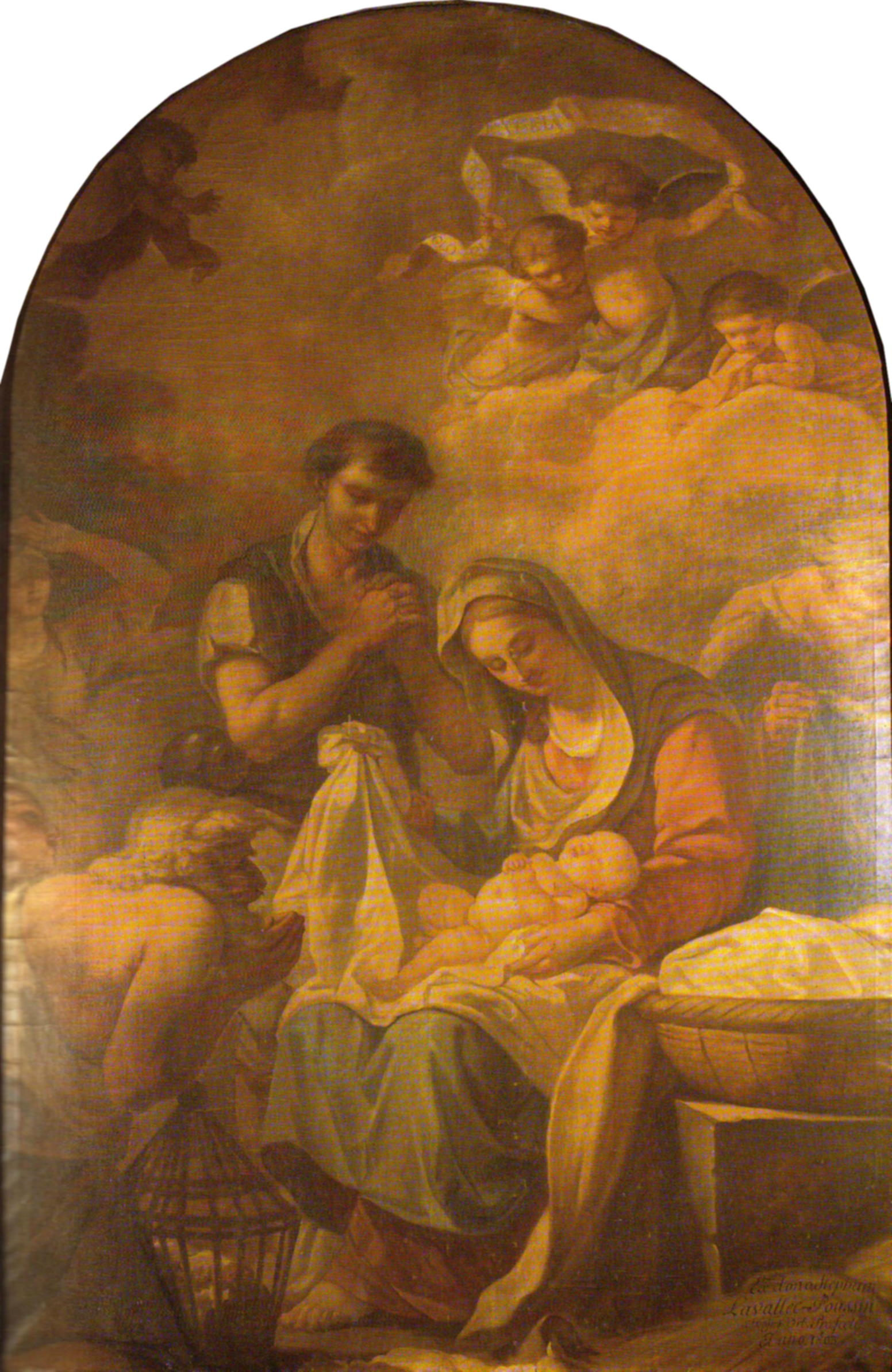
Adoration des bergers by Étienne de La Vallée Poussin

Étienne de La Vallée Poussin (French pronunciation: [etjɛn də la vale pusɛ̃]; 1735–1802), also called Delavallée-Poussin in certain biographies, was a French history painter and creator of interior decorative schemes.

== Life ==
Related on his mother's side to the family of the great painter Nicolas Poussin, La Vallée-Poussin was born in Rouen, where he attended the école des Beaux-Arts, under Descamps, and made rapid progress in his studies. After having been one of the top laureates of the school three times, he went to Paris to perfect his art. Welcomed into the workshop of Jean-Baptiste Marie Pierre, the royal painter, he won the 1759 1e prix de l'Académie Royale de peinture et de sculpture and set off for Italy.

La Vallée-Poussin spent many years in Rome, where he was admitted to the Maltese order with the rank of "Cavalier Donato" (i.e. not of noble lineage, but given for services rendered to the order) and where he became a member of the Academy of Arcadia. On his return to France, he was in 1789 admitted to the Académie de Peinture, with a tableau de réception entitled Return of the young Tobias and his meeting his mother and father. He died in Paris.

== Collections ==
His work is held in the permanent collections of several institutions worldwide, including the British Museum, the Philadelphia Museum of Art, the Cooper Hewitt, the Museum of Fine Arts, Boston, the National Gallery of Canada, the Montreal Museum of Fine Arts, and the Victoria and Albert Museum.

== Works ==
=== Paintings ===
- The Miracle of the prophet Elijah in multiplying the oil for the poor widow - this is the painting with which he won his Grand Prix
- Portrait of Benedict XIV, Musée des beaux-arts de Rouen
- The birth of Jesus Christ and Adoration of the Shepherds (two massive canvases)
- The Flight to Egypt (1774) in the Chapel of the Immaculate Heart of Mary of the church of Sant'Eustachio in Rome
- Anacreon, Sappho, Eros and a Female Dancer (circa 1790) at the Utah Museum of Fine Arts

=== Books ===
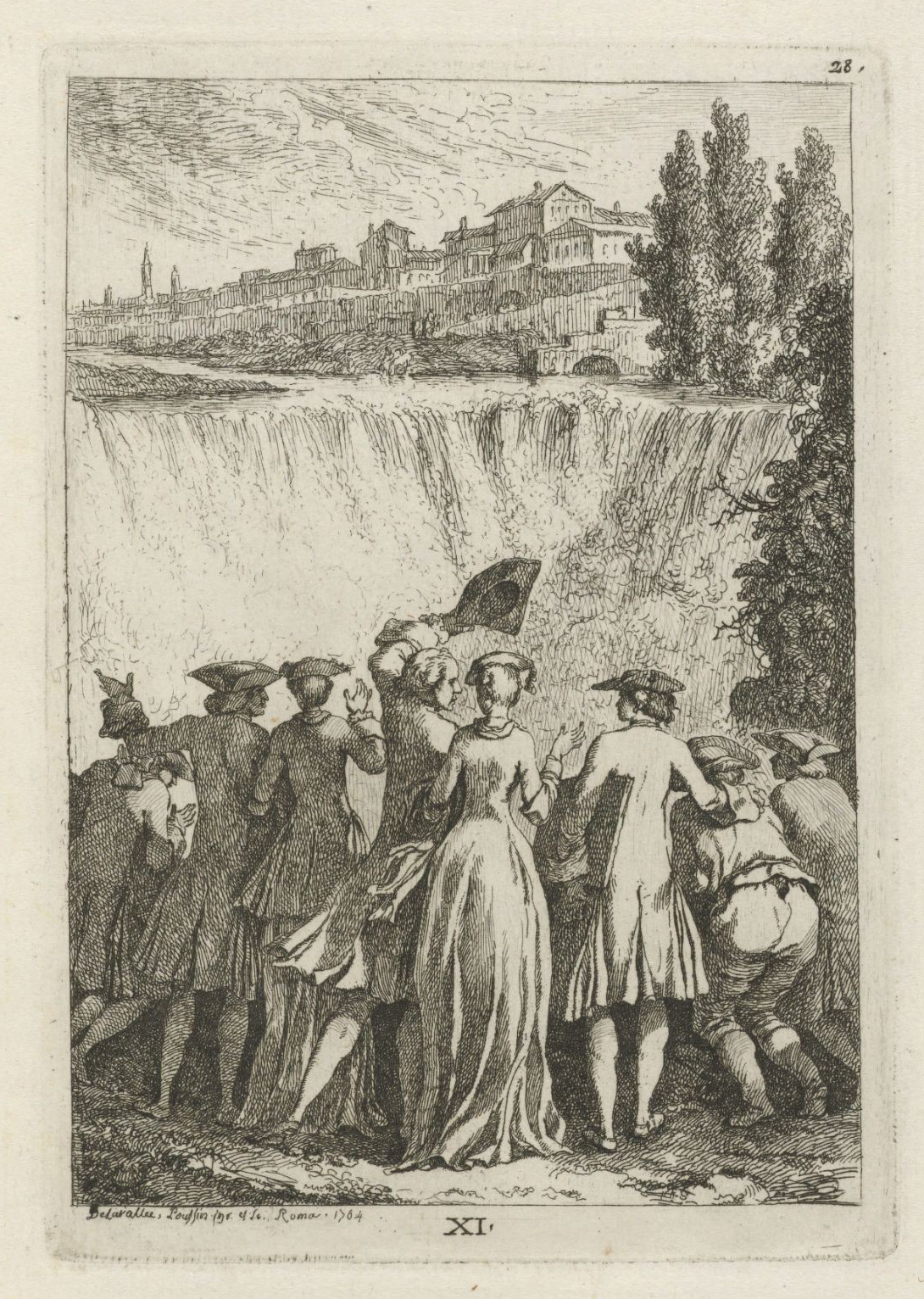
Nella venuta in Roma, 1764

- The work entitled Nella venuta in Roma (The Arrival in Rome), published in a quarto volume in 1764, contained various figures by La Vallée-Poussin.
- Another publication, by Alexandre Lenoir, contains forty plates of arabesques for interior decoration, of the type at which La Vallée-Poussin excelled. "The drawings of this painter of Rouen", writes Chennevières, "are greatly beautiful in character, full of feeling and render themselves truly worthy of the proud name which they bear."

=== Drawings ===
- Prayer : women and children kneeling or sitting in church, Musée du Louvre
- Monks distributing soup to the poor, Musée du Louvre

== See also ==
- La Vallée-Poussin

== Bibliography ==
- Ludovic de La Vallée Poussin, Étienne de La Vallée Poussin, peintre d'histoire et décorateur (1735-1802), Rouen, Cagniard, 1927
