= Louis de La Vallée-Poussin =

- Born: 1 January 1869; Liège
- Died: 18 February 1938 (aged 69); Brussels
- Citizenship: Belgian
- Occupations: Indologist and scholar of Buddhist Studies

Louis Étienne Joseph Marie de La Vallée-Poussin (1 January 1869 – 18 February 1938) was a Belgian Indologist and scholar of Buddhist Studies.

== Biography ==
La Vallée-Poussin was born in Liège, where he received his early education. He studied at the University of Liège from 1884 to 1888, receiving his doctorate at the age of nineteen. He studied Sanskrit, Pali, and Avestan under Charles de Harlez and Philippe Colinet from 1888 to 1890 at the University of Louvain, receiving a docteur en langues orientales in July 1891. Moving to Paris, he began his studies at the Sorbonne that same year under Victor Henri and Sylvain Lévi. During this time (1891–1892), he also occupied the chair of Sanskrit at the University of Liège. He continued his study of Avestan and the Zoroastrian Gathas under Hendrik Kern at Leiden University, where he also took up the study of Chinese and Tibetan. In 1893, he attained a professorship at the University of Ghent teaching comparative grammar of Greek and Latin, a position which he held until his retirement in 1929.

Louis de La Vallée-Poussin died on February 18, 1938, in Brussels, Belgium at the age of 69.

== Musila et Nārada ==
In 1937 La Vallée-Poussin published Musila et Nārada, an influential study on two ways of attaining nirvana, exemplified by the monks Musila and Nārada.

== Major works ==
- Nirvana
- La Morale bouddhique
- Documents d'Abhidharma : La controverse du temps, des dieux, les quatre, les trois vérités
- L’Abhidharmakośa de Vasubandhu. 6 vols. Paris: 1923–31.
- Vijñaptimātratāsiddhi: La Siddhi de Hiuan-Tsang, (1928–1929)
- L'Inde aux temps des mauryas et des Barbares, Grecs, Scythes, Parthes et Yue-Tchi
- Dynasties et histoire de l'Inde depuis Kanişka jusqu'aux invasions musulmanes (1935)
- Bouddhisme. Opinions sur l'histoire de la dogmatique
- Indo-européens et indo-iraniens. L'Inde jusque vers 300 avant J.-C, (1924)

== See also ==
- La Vallée-Poussin

== Sources ==
- Buswell, Robert Jr; Lopez, Donald S. Jr., eds. (2013), "La Vallée Poussin, Louis de", Princeton Dictionary of Buddhism, Princeton, NJ: Princeton University Press, ISBN 9780691157863
- Griffiths, Paul (1981), "Concentration or Insight; The Problematic of Theravada Buddhist Meditation-theory", The Journal of the American Academy of Religion
