= Guilliam Forchondt the Elder =

Flemish painter

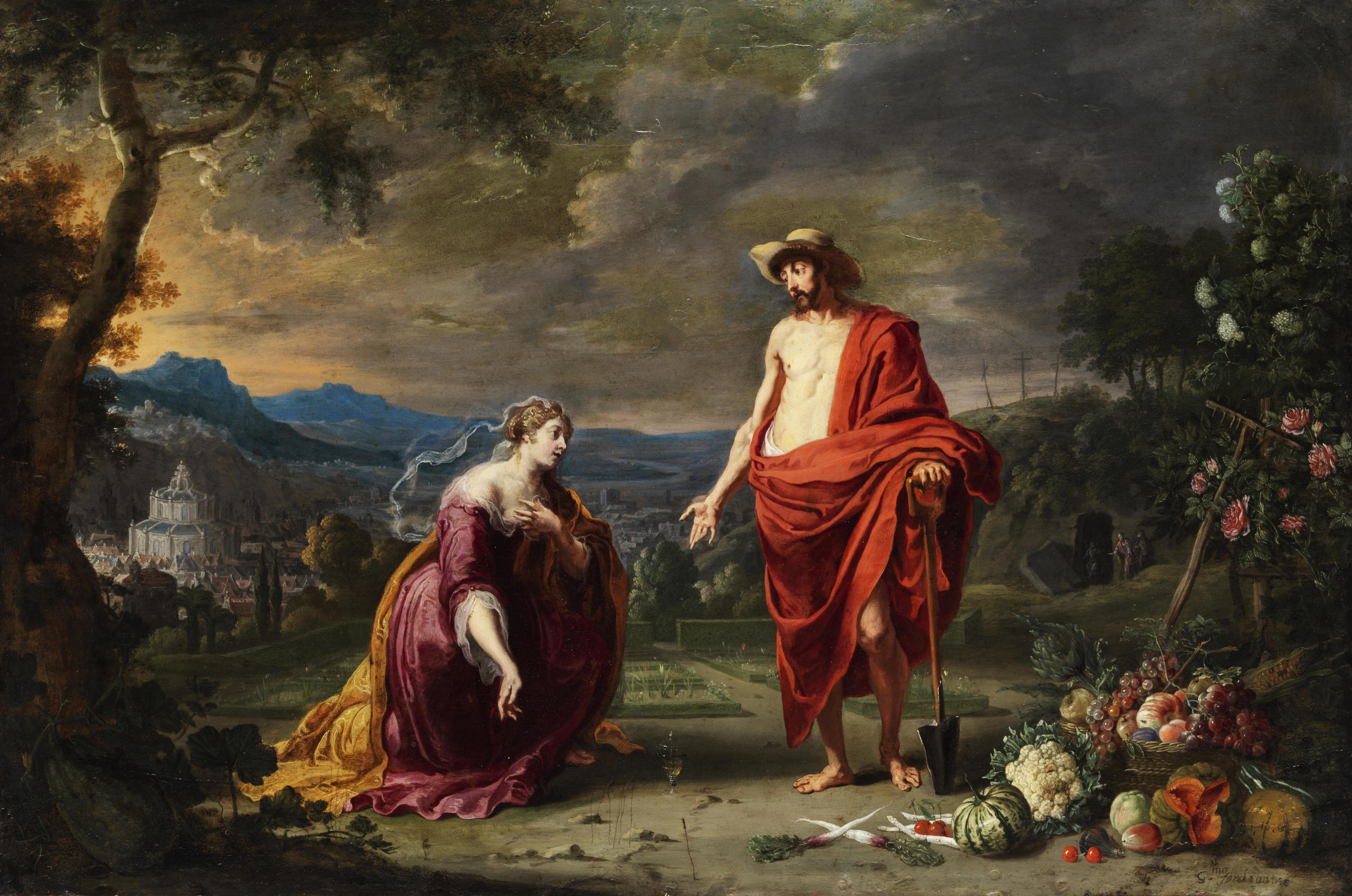
Noli me tangere by Forchondt and Willem van Herp

Willem Forchondt, or Guillam Forchondt the Elder (1608–1678) was a Flemish painter, cabinet maker and art dealer. He operated a successful painting workshop and a profitable dealership which extended throughout Europe through the satellite offices operated by his sons in Vienna, Lisbon and Cadiz. His international art dealership played an important role in the spread of Flemish Baroque art in Europe and South-America. He changed the relationship between art dealer and artist by becoming involved in the organisation of the art production process.

== Life ==
He was born in Antwerp as the son of the ebony worker and art dealer Melchior Forchondt the Elder, originally from Breslau and Anna Wolfheckers. He was the brother of Melchior the Younger. Melchior the Elder made his name dealing in ebony cabinets that were decorated with oil paintings, that he commissioned from members of the Antwerp Guild of St. Luke.

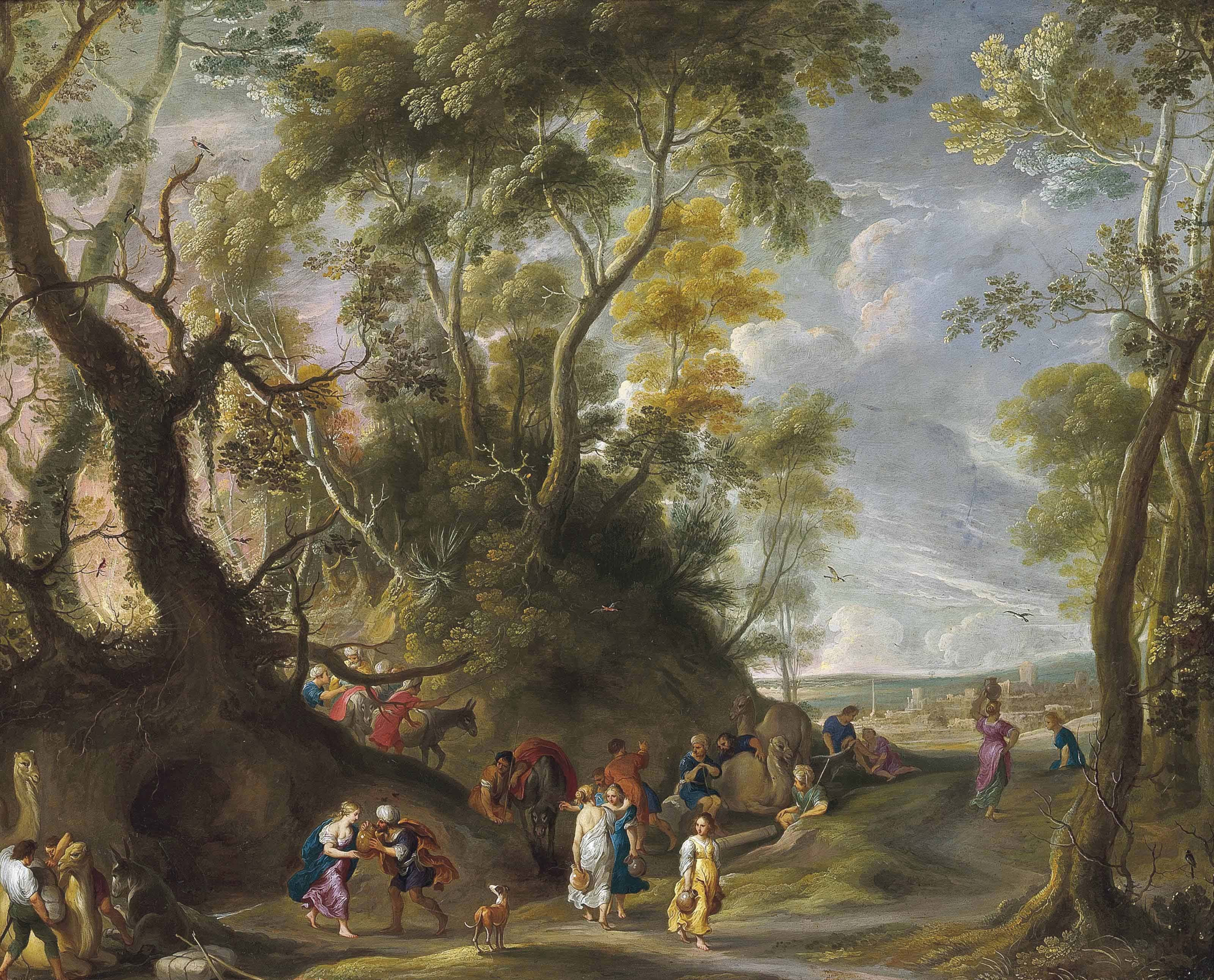
The departure of the Israelites, likely another collaboration with Willem van Herp

Young Guilliam grew up in this artistic milieu and became a member of the guild in 1632 as a "winemaster", which meant his father was still a member at the time. Like his father, he was skilled as a maker of cabinets. When his father died in 1633, Guillam took over the business. He married Maria Lemmens on 3 August 1636. The couple had eight children, among whom are known:

- Alexander (1643–1683) trained as a pharmacist and became an art dealer for his father in Vienna while also being court jeweler for Leopold I, Holy Roman Emperor. He took over the leadership of the Forchondt firm when his father died in 1670, he died in 1683.
- Melchior III (1641–1708) became a painter and goldsmith and stayed in Venice, Paris, Vienna, Prague, Linz and Passau. He married Ursula van der Greyn in 1679.
- Marcus (1651–1706) became a painter and jeweler and stayed in Vienna and Linz. He married Maria Vermeulen and had a daughter Isabella who later married a man with the last name Paeffenrode.
- Susanna (1637–1711) never married and left a legacy including the family archives. She was admitted as a merchant in the Antwerp Guild of Saint Luke in 1688.
- Anna Maria (1639–1711), she spent most of her live in Vienna where she married Frans Vasterhavens (who died 1718).
- Justo (1647–1709) was a merchant and banker, he travelled to Lisbon and later Cadiz, where he stayed for the family business until his return to Antwerp in 1707. He married Anna Isabella van den Berghe in 1709.
- Andreas (1650–1675) also travelled to Cadiz. He was internationally renowned as an art dealer and financier.
- Guilliam Forchondt the Younger (1645–after 1677) was the only son to train as a painter. He traveled first with his brothers to Vienna and Linz and later to Lisbon and Cadiz. He would later carry on the family business, possibly together with his mother.

With the help of this network of family connections in Europe Forchondt was able to turn his father's business into an international art and luxury goods enterprise. The many clients of the Forchondt firm included prominent personalities of the time such as the Emperor of Austria and the Princes of Liechtenstein. Around 1700 Hans-Adam I, Prince of Liechtenstein acquired from the Forchondt firm two masterpieces of Rubens: the Massacre of the Innocents and Samson and Delilah.

Guillam Forchondt died in Antwerp.

== Dozijnschilder ==
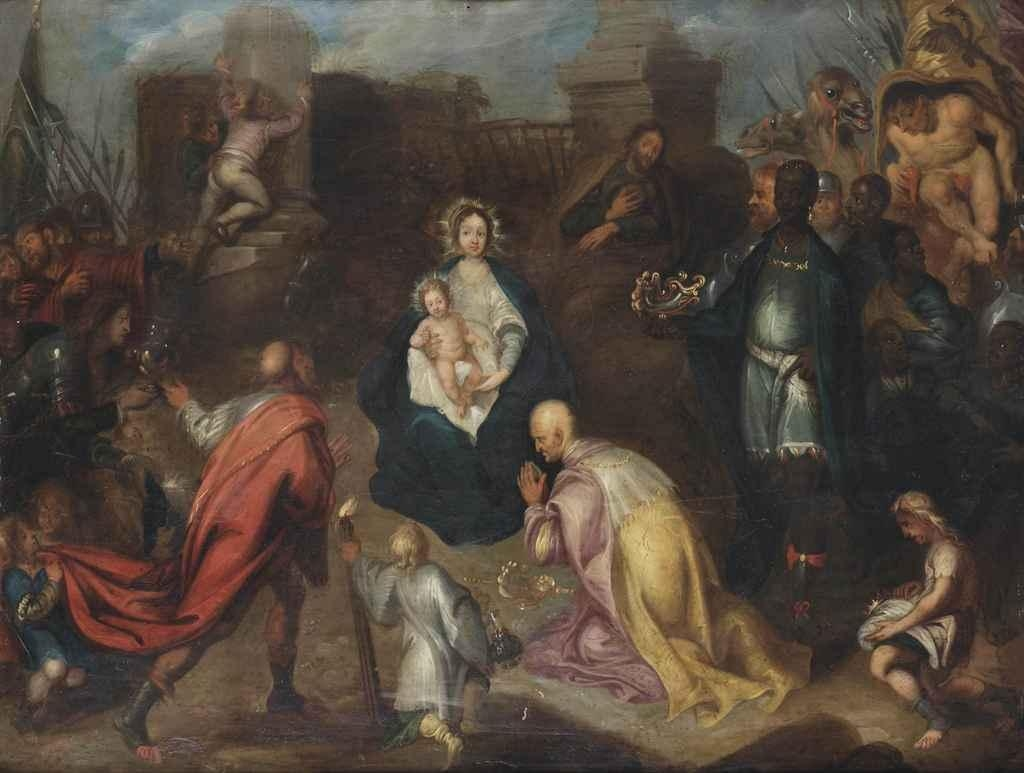
The Adoration of the Magi

As a painter Forchondt worked in the Flemish Baroque style of Rubens, Jan Brueghel the Younger, Joos de Momper and David Teniers the Younger clearly adapting his output to the demand in the market. Many of his works can be regarded as pastiches or reduced copies of works by Rubens. He is known to have collaborated on compositions with other painters such as Willem van Herp who painted the staffage. Forchondt enjoyed a high reputation for his design drawings for cabinets.

In the 1670s, Flanders suffered a severe economic downturn, mostly due to an invasion by the French. Guillam Forchondt and his brother Melchior the Younger weathered the crisis by becoming art entrepreneurs. They hired lesser painters and supplied them with the necessary materials to create group projects such as large commissioned copies of famous works, or large decorative objects as their father had dealt in. At one point, the Brothers Forchondt had 60 painters in their service for export to France, Austria, Spain and Portugal. Among the painters in their employ were Franciscus Hamers who became a member of the guild in 1674, and Peter van de Velde. Other painters such as Willem van Herp, Michiel II Coignet, Abraham Willemsens, Pieter van Lint, Simon de Vos, Alexander Casteels the Elder and Gerard de la Vallée regularly worked for the Forchondts on various commissions.

There was at that time a great demand abroad and in particular in Spain for paintings in the style of the great Flemish masters such as Rubens and Anthony van Dyck. Art dealers such as the Forchondts who had a local representation in various foreign countries facilitated the trade in these paintings. The religious works were often painted on copper, a painting medium that was much appreciated in Spain, both because of its durability and its glossy finish. The group works created under the direction of the Forchondt firm played an important role in the spread of paintings on copper in Mexico where they were exported through Spain's trade with Latin America.

Though he probably did his colleagues in the guild a service by creating production work and new export channels for sales, he was never referred to by name by the Dutch artist biographer Arnold Houbraken, who called him and his family the keelbeulen (cut throats) of Antwerp. Other artists and craftsmen likely regarded art entrepreneurs like Forchondt as persons who interfered in the artistic process without actually carrying out any manual work. The small ebony masters in Antwerp became so frustrated with Forchondt that they commenced litigation requiring that like them he pass a master test in order to retain his guild membership. They likely did this to confirm the importance of this test to their status as craftsmen at a time when the more entrepreneurial organization of their craft (by dealers like Forchondt) threatened their position. As the son of a master, Forchondt had not undertaken any formal apprenticeship and likely had avoided the master test.
