= Peter van de Velde =

Flemish painter

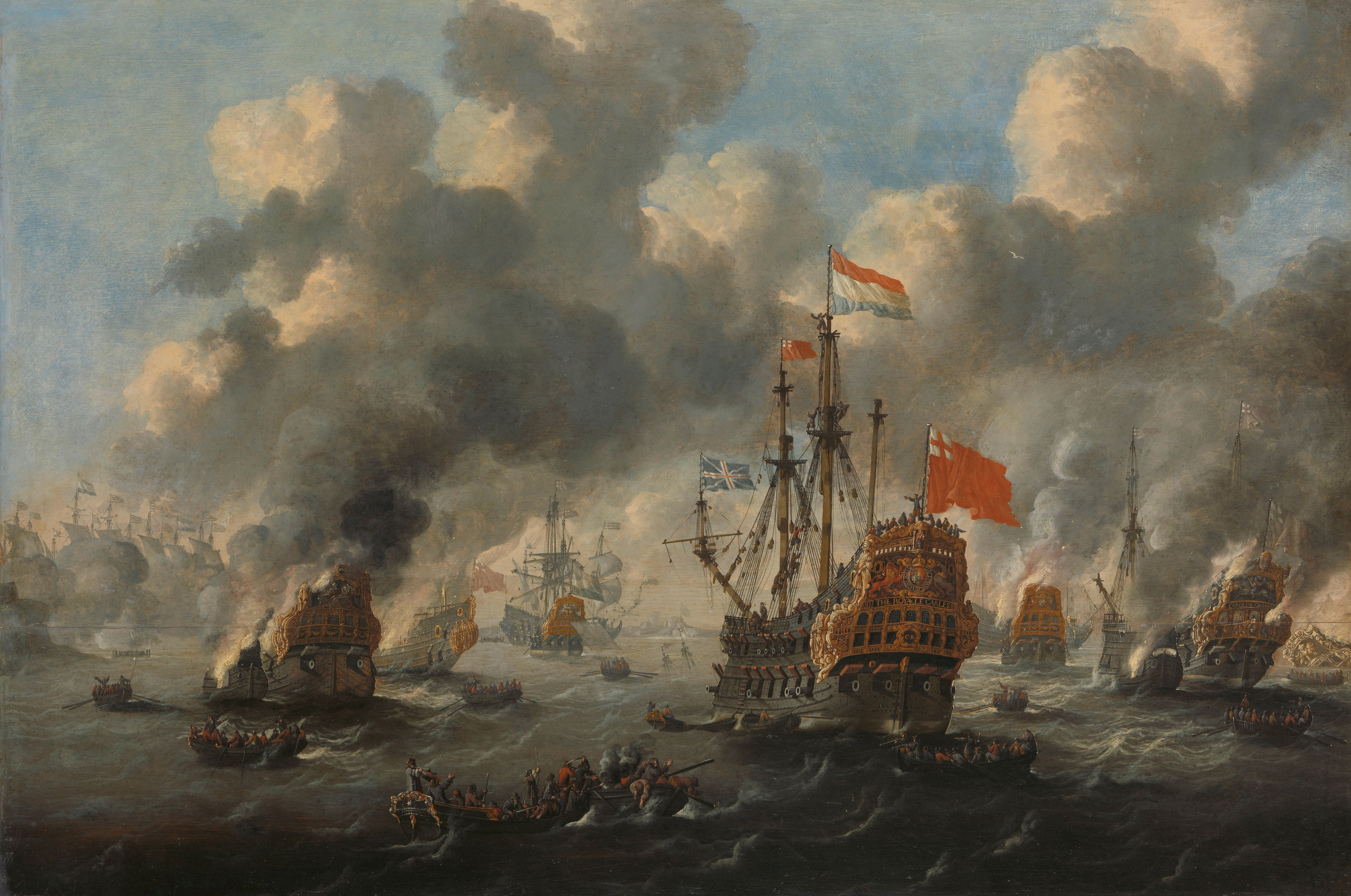
The Dutch burn down the English fleet before Chatham

Peter van de Velde or Peter van den Velde was a Flemish marine painter who was active in Antwerp. Some art historians believe that the long lifespan attributed to this artist could hide two artists operating under the same name, possibly a father and his son.

== Life ==
He was born in Antwerp where he became a master of the Guild of St. Luke in 1654. Between 1666 and 1680 he is recorded in the guild as having pupils.

Between 1668 and 1675 he is recorded producing 50 paintings as dozijnschilder for the Antwerp art dealers Forchondt, who exported these works to Vienna. Guilliam Forchondt II later moved to Spain to support the family business. The question whether he played a role in the views of Spain created by van de Velde remains unanswered.

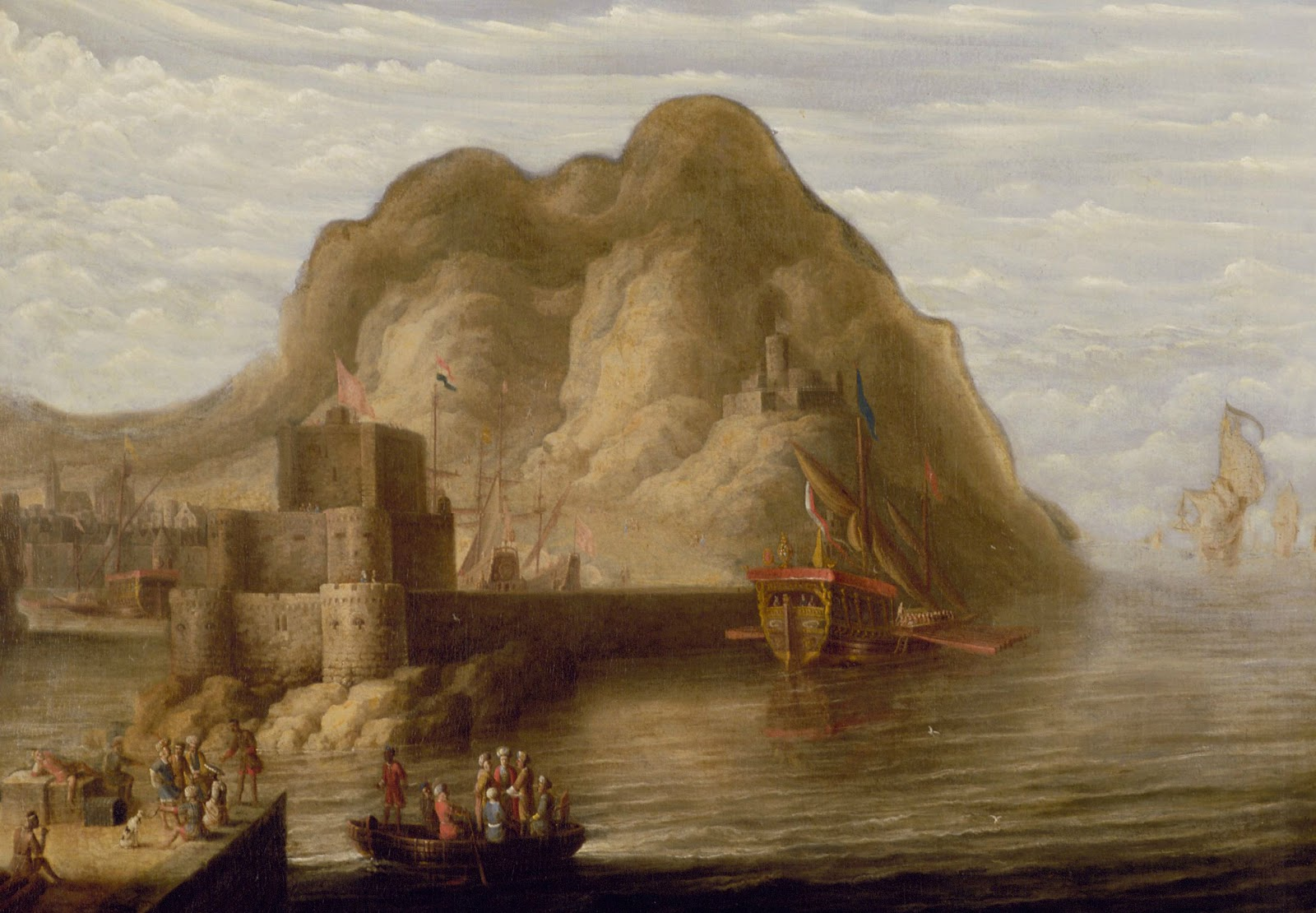
View of Gibraltar

Considering the great age that this painter is supposed to have reached, it is possible that the name Peter van de Velde refers actually to two painters, maybe a father and son pair who signed with the same name. A son of Peter van de Velde was baptized in Antwerp in 1687.

Peter van de Velde died some time after 1723, the latest date discovered on one of his paintings.

== Work ==
Peter van de Velde is known for marines in stormy seas and his coastal landscapes, often of Oriental harbours. He monogrammed his work with P.V.V. or PVV.

A large part of the paintings attributed to Peter van de Velde seem to be mass-produced and suggest that he worked as a painter in the employ of art dealer Gilliam Forchondt.
