= Charles-Louis de la Vallée Poussin =

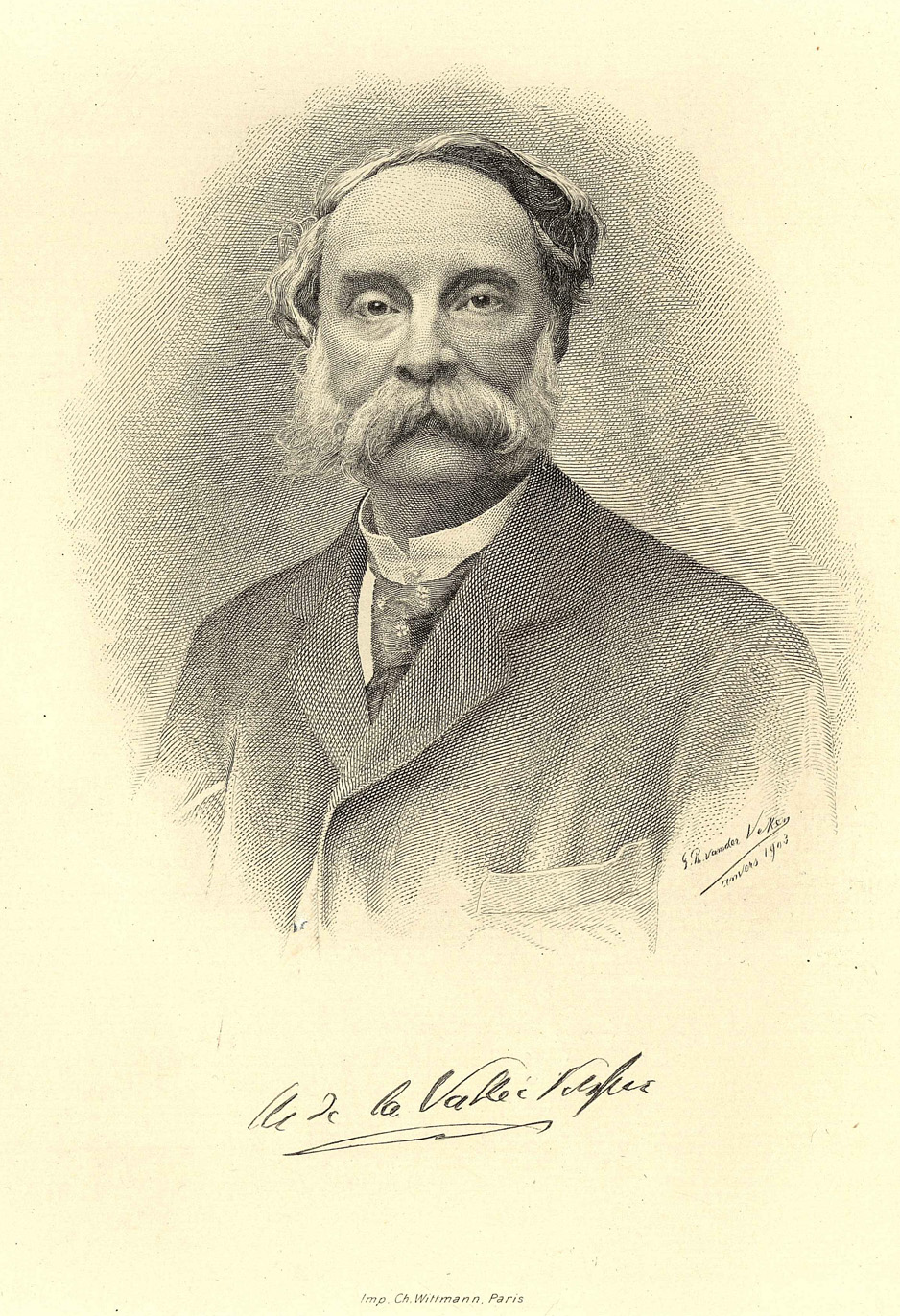
Charles-Louis de la Vallée Poussin

Charles-Louis-Joseph-Xavier de la Vallée Poussin (6 April 1827, Namur – 15 March 1903, Brussels) was a Belgian geologist and mineralogist. His son was the mathematician Charles Jean de la Vallée Poussin.

== Academic career ==
Professor of geology and mineralogy at the Catholic University of Leuven (1863), and a doctor honoris causa of the same university (1876), he was vice president of the directing council of the geological map of Belgium (1903).

He studied humanities at the Collège Notre-Dame-de-la-Paix, Namur, he studied mathematics in Paris, and for ten years devoted himself to literature and philosophy. He attracted attention by his literary and scientific criticisms in various reviews. Appointed professor in 1863 on the recommendation of Omalius d'Halloy, he instigated the teaching of geology and mineralogy at the University of Louvain.

De la Vallée Poussin wrote publications on the microscopic study of the crystalline rocks of the Belgian and French Ardennes, several in collaboration with A.F. Renard. Of these the first (1876) was crowned by the Royal Academy of Belgium. He also wrote numerous notes on the Carboniferous limestones of the Ardennes and fixed the true stratigraphical relations of its beds and destroy Dupont's theory of lacunæ. He studied the formation of the Valley of the Meuse; and wrote popularizing articles, which rank him with the first promoters of physical geography. Finally he helped with the preparation of the official geological map of Belgium.

== See also ==
La Vallée Poussin
