= Simon de la Vallée =

French-Swedish architect (1590–1642)

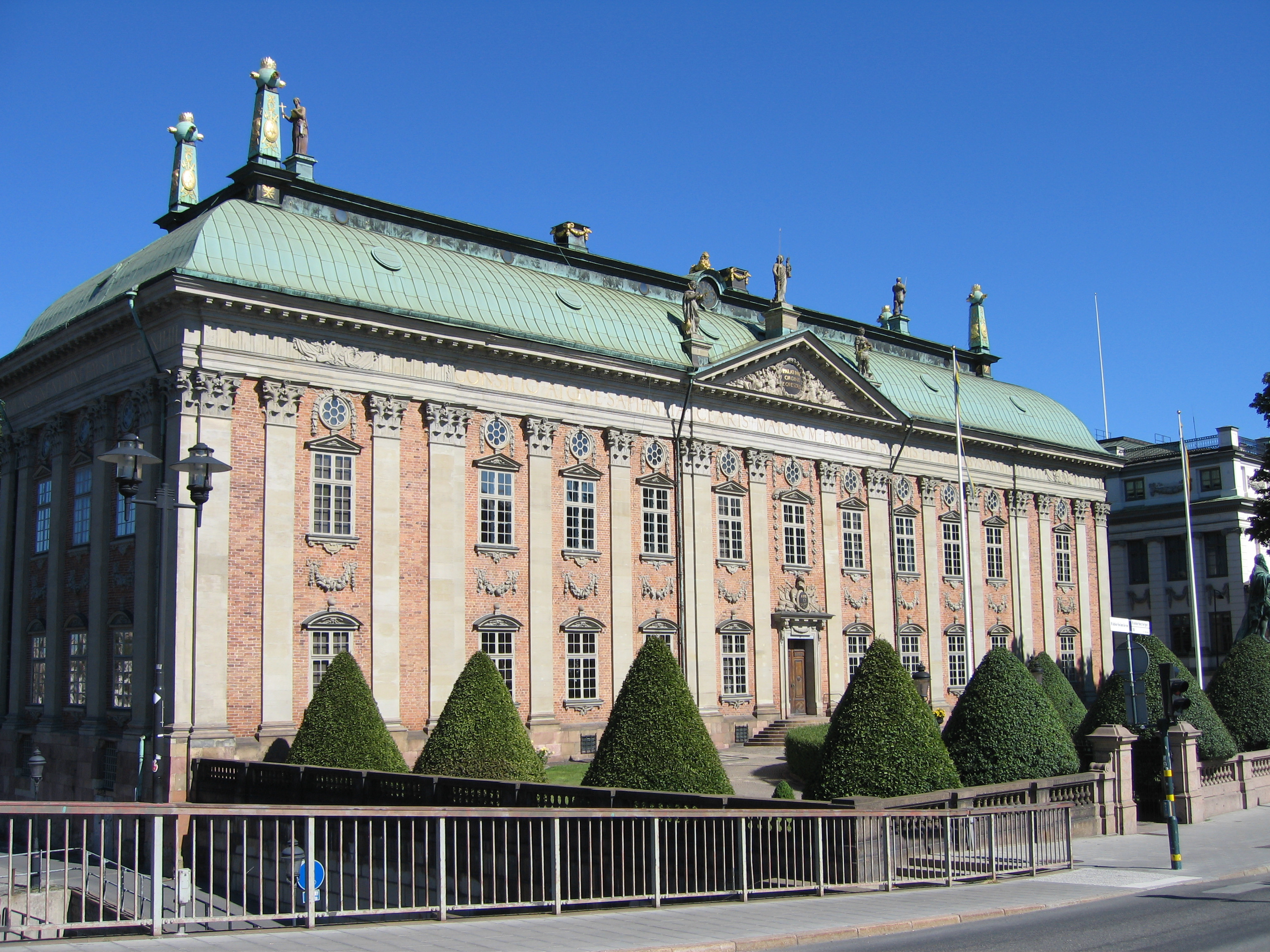
Simon de la Vallée: Riddarhuset or the House of Nobility, Stockholm

Simon de la Vallée (1590–1642) was a French-Swedish architect. The first architect in Sweden to have received formal academic training, he created the Swedish school of architecture.

== Biography ==
Born in Paris, he was the son of Marin de la Vallée (1576–1655), an architect associated with the Paris Hôtel de Ville and the Luxembourg Palace. After studying under Salomon de Brosse (1571–1626), he spent the next eight years on several study trips, travelling in particular to Italy, Syria, Jerusalem and Persia. After returning to Paris in 1633, he was charged by Prince Frederick Henry of Orange to undertake work on the Honselaarsdijk Palace in the Netherlands.

In 1637, he was invited to Stockholm by Field Marshal Åke Tott (1598-1640) on behalf of Queen Christina of Sweden where he first worked on Ekolsund Castle. In 1639, he was given the title of Royal Architect. His commissions included the castles of Tidö and Hässelby as well as several palaces in Stockholm. He designed the exquisite Riddarhuset but was killed by the nobleman Erik Oxenstierna (1624-1656), a week after construction had begun. The building was completed by his son Jean de la Vallée whom he had trained as an architect.

Other buildings designed by Simon de la Vallée include Axel Oxenstierna Palace, inspired by the Renaissance palaces of Raphael, and the octagonal Hedvig Eleonora Church, both in Stockholm.

== Family ==
Simon de la Vallée was married at least four times, with:

- Margarethe de Villars (died 1635) with whom he had two sons, Jean (born 1624) and Henri (born 1634);
- Marie le Cockaine (marriage dissolved)
- Marie le Tuilliers (marriage dissolved)
- Pauline de Courlas, one of Queen Christina's ladies in waiting, with whom he had a son, Gustaf de la Vallée (born 1641).

== Principal works ==
Simon de la Vallée designed or contributed to the design of the following buildings:

- Ryning Palace, Stockholm (1640-1644)
- Hedvig Eleonora Church, Stockholm
- Axel Oxenstierna palace, Stockholm
- Ekolsund Castle
- Riddarhuset, Stockholm (1641-1674)
- Hässelby Castle, Uppland (1640s)
- Tidö Castle in Västmanland
- Huis ter Nieuwburg in Rijswijk, Dutch Republic
- Part of Rosersberg Palace, Uppland
- Renaissance additions to Örbyhus Castle, Uppland
- Completes and furnishes Huis Honselaarsdijk, near The Hague, Dutch Republic
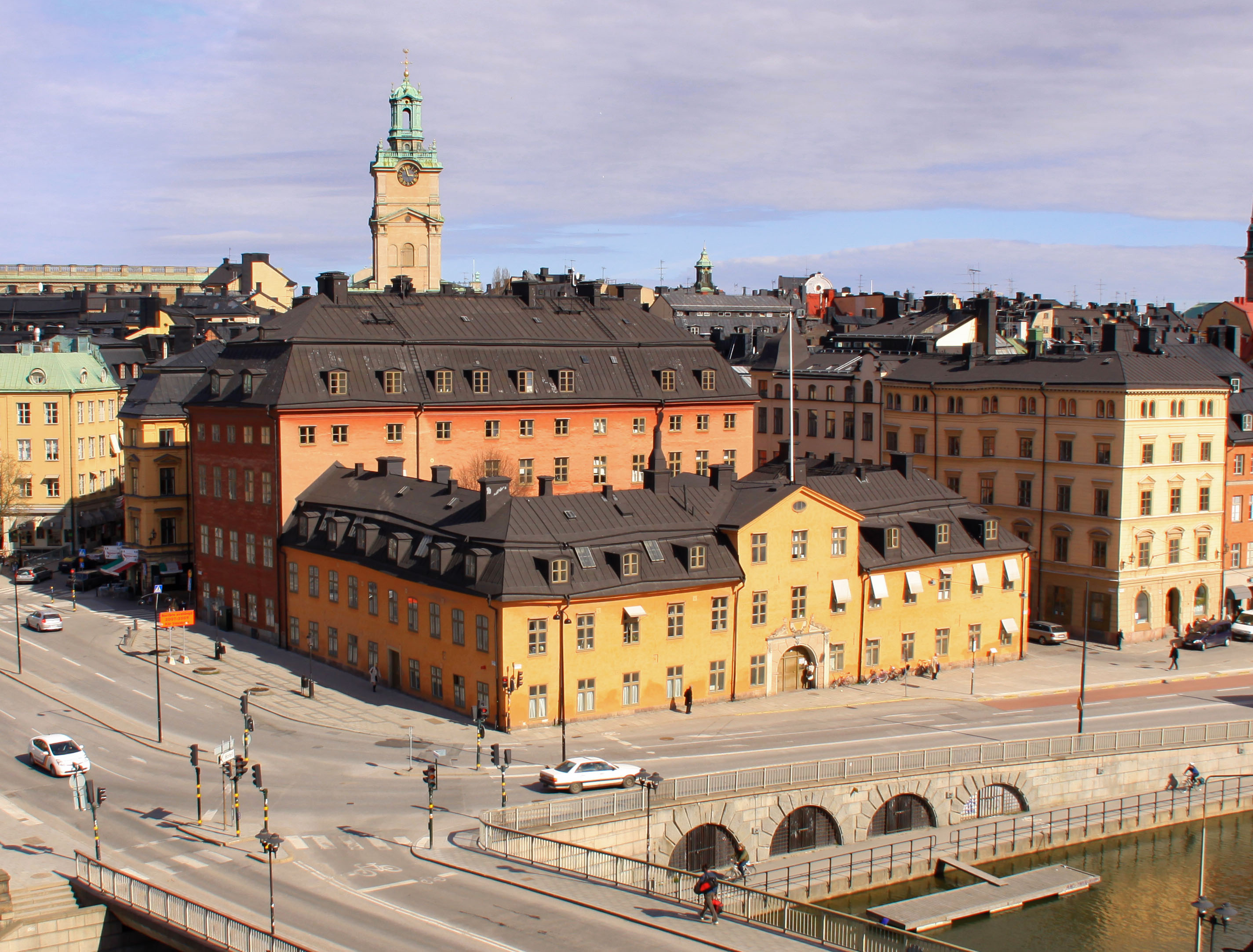
Ryning Palace, Stockholm

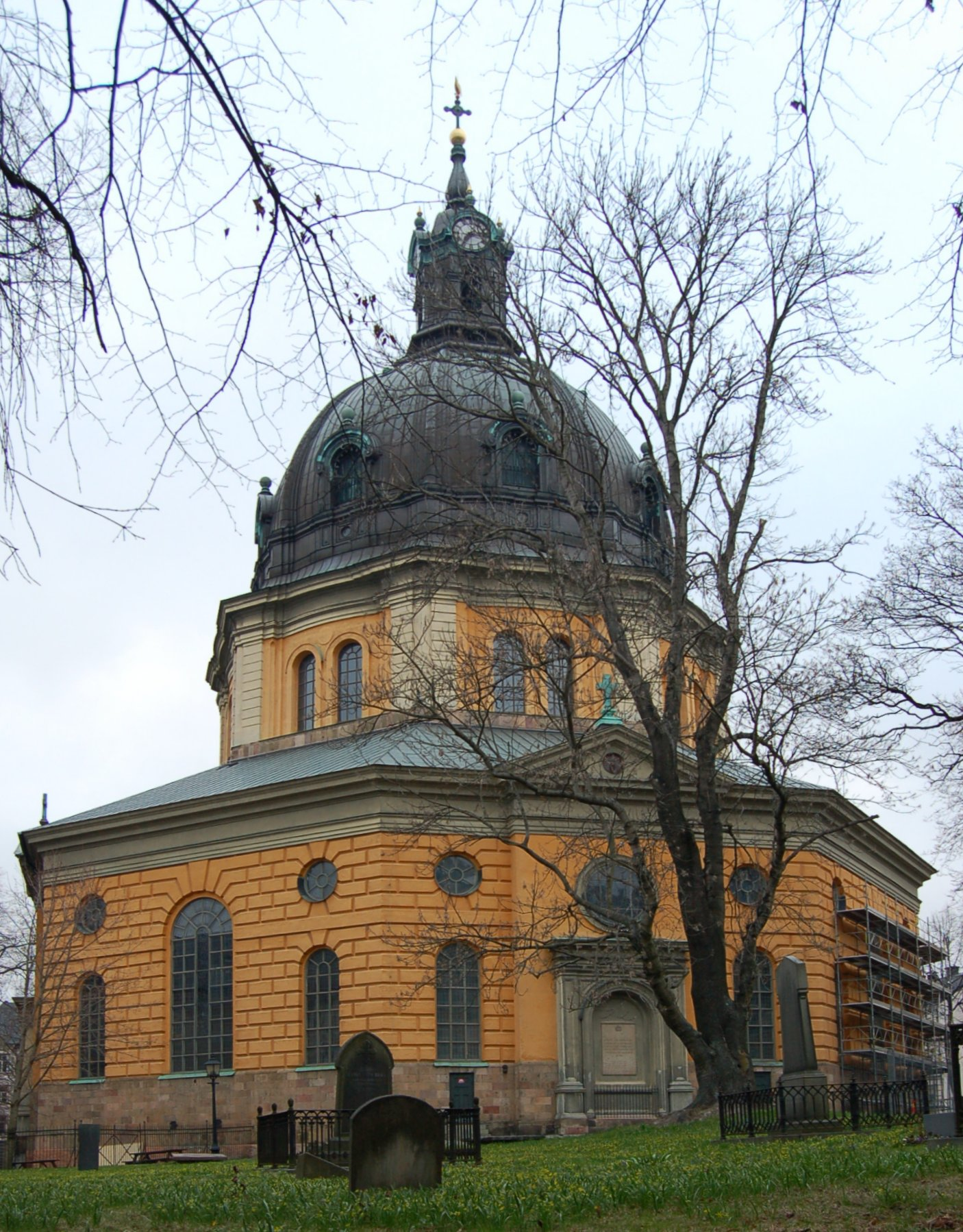
Hedvig Eleonora Church, Stockholm

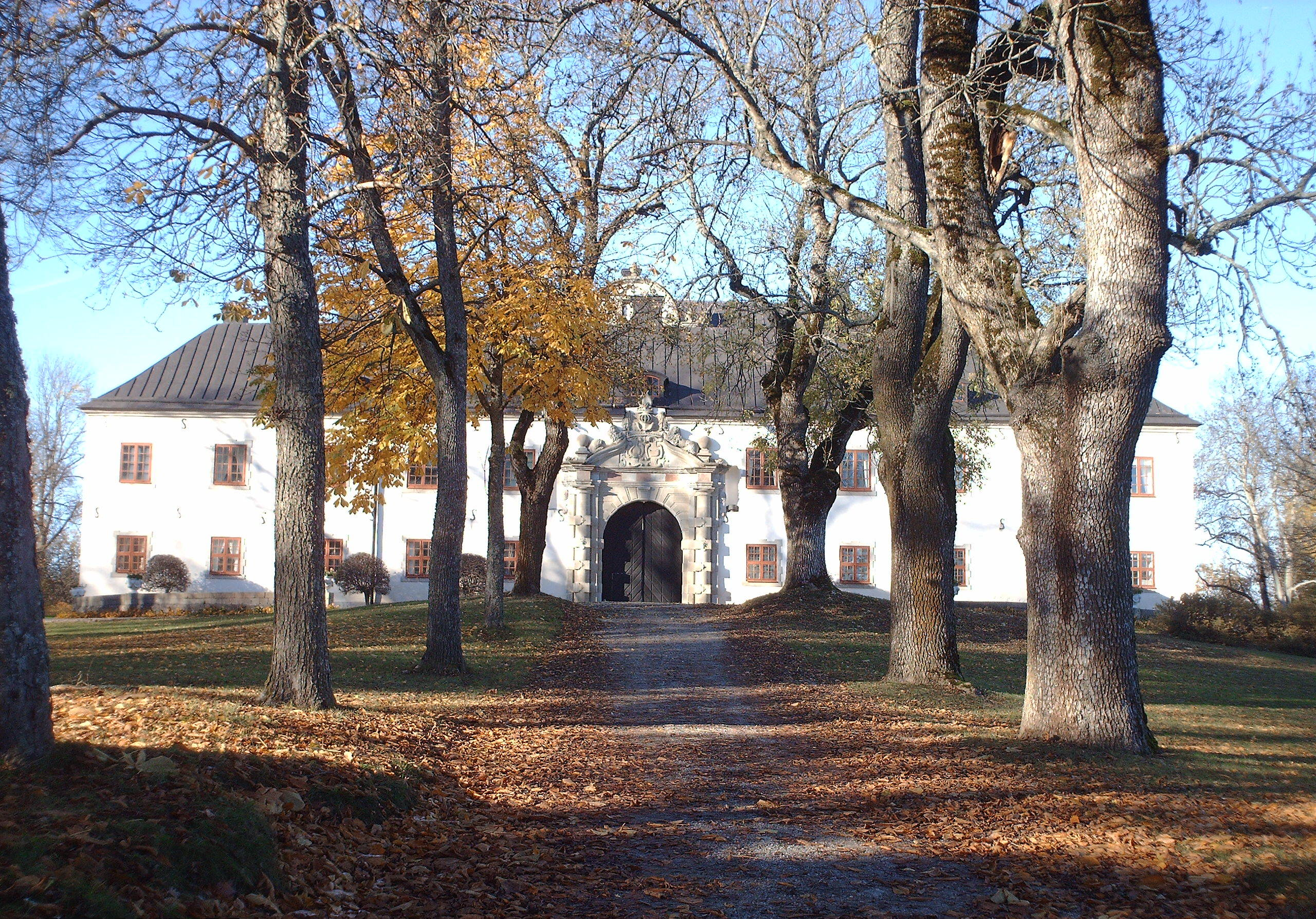
Tidö Castle, Västmanland

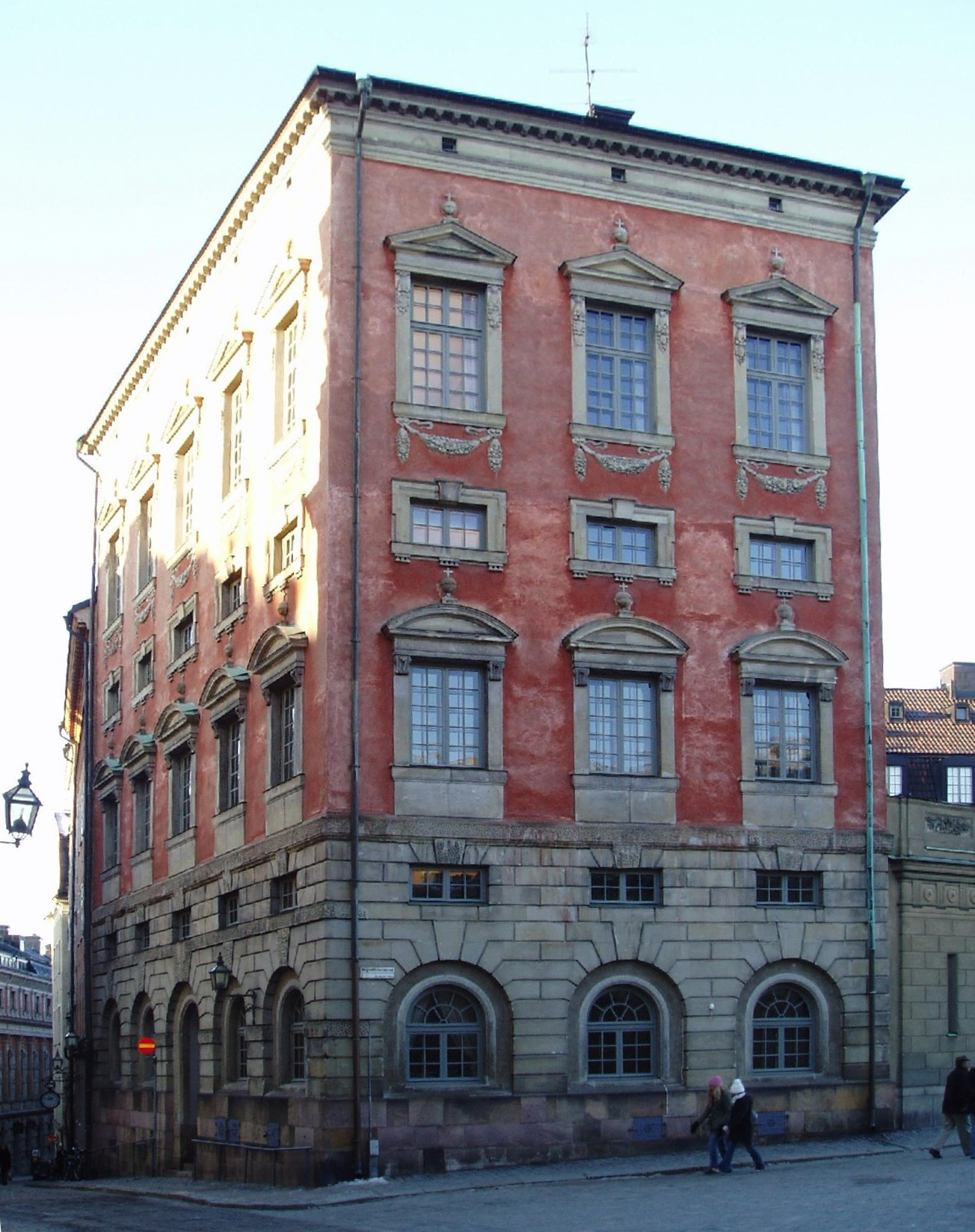
Oxenstierna Palace, Stockholm

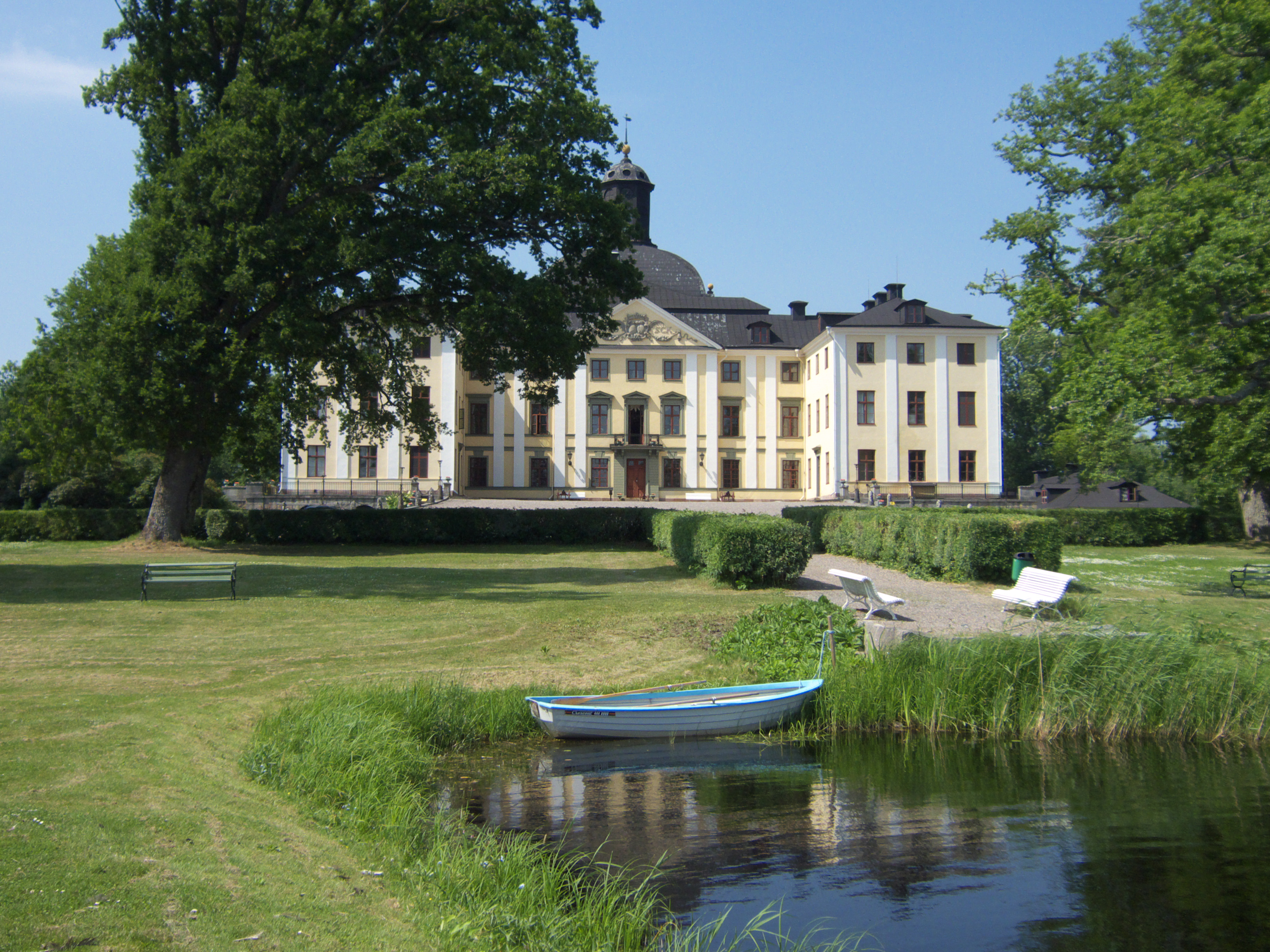
Örbyhus Castle, Uppland

== Sources ==
- Louis Dussieux Les artistes français à lʹétranger: recherches sur leurs travaux, 1856, p. 447.
- Tord Öson Nordberg, Marin de la Vallée, in: Konsthistorisk Tidskrift, Stockholm, volume 27, Nos 1-4, 1958.
- Tord Öson Nordberg, De la Vallée: en arkitektfamilj i Frankrike, Holland och Sverige, Stockholm, Almqvist & Wiksell, 1970.
- Linnéa Rollenhagen Tilly, "De maître maçon à architecte: Simon et Jean de la Vallée en Suède " i Olga Medvedkova (dir.) Les Européens : ces architectes qui ont conçu l’Europe (1450-1950), Paris 2017, p. 107-127.
