= François de Callières =

French writer and diplomat (1645–1717)

François de Callières, sieur de Rochelay et de Gigny (French pronunciation: [fʁɑ̃swa də kaljɛʁ]; 14 May 1645, Thorigny-sur-Vire, Lower Normandy – 5 March 1717, Paris) was a member of the Académie française, a diplomat and writer, a special envoy of Louis XIV who was one of three French plenipotentiaries who signed the Peace of Ryswick in 1697; his De la manière de négocier avec les souverains, 1716 ("On the manner of negotiating with sovereigns", translated as The Practice of Diplomacy), based on his experiences in negotiating the Treaty and having its origins in a letter to the Regent, Philippe, duc d'Orléans, to whom the work was dedicated, became a textbook for eighteenth-century diplomacy: Thomas Jefferson had a copy in his library at Monticello. Of this book John Kenneth Galbraith declared "One wonders why anything more needed to be said on the subject."

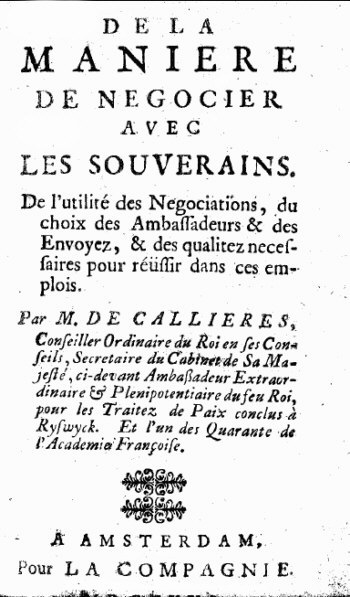
Title page of François de Callières, De la manière de négocier (1716).

The companion volume, on the other hand, De la science du monde et des connaissances utiles à la conduite de la vie is less known, though it was quickly translated into English and was admired by Jefferson and Harold Nicolson.

== Biography ==
He was the son of Jacques de Callières, governor of Cherbourg and the author of La Fortune des gens de qualité et des gentilshommes particuliers, enseignant l'art de vivre à la cour suivant les maximes de la politique et de la morale ("The Fortune of people of quality and private gentlemen, teaching the art of living at court according to the maxims of politics and morality")

His first commission, at the age of twenty-two, was on behalf of Henri, duc de Longueville, who sent him to Poland in order to press for the election of his son Charles Paris d'Orléans, Count of Saint-Pol as King of Poland. The unlucky count was killed or drowned in a crossing of the Rhine in 1672, and the commission came to nothing.
Callières served discreetly in several European negotiations in the following years: Carlo Emmanuele II, Duke of Savoy employed him in attempting an alliance with France that was cut short by the Duke's death in 1675, but as the Savoyard envoy to Bavaria, Callières was involved in early stages of the negotiations that would eventually bring a Bavarian princess to the court of Louis as bride of the Grand Dauphin.

In Paris he produced several books, including in 1688 a sensible and even-handed contribution in the Quarrel of the Ancients and the Moderns, Histoire poetique de la guerre nouvellement declarée entre les anciens et les modernes ("Poetic history of the war recently declared between the ancients and the moderns"); it included a poem on the subject by Charles Perrault. On 23 December 1689 he was elected to the Académie française; his reception piece was a panegyric on Louis XIV. Three galante works followed, a volume of the latest courtly expressions and the right moves, one reporting bons mots and witty anecdotes of raillery and one on the bon usage of the French spoken at Court, contrasted with middle-class expressions, for people of quality to avoid.

In 1694, when the misfortunes of war and a bad harvest in France had brought Louis round to negotiating with the League of Augsburg, Callières' Polish connections in Amsterdam alerted him that the United Provinces were ready for peace. Callières in turn alerted Colbert de Croissy, who sent him in great secrecy to Flanders with Louis de Verjus accompanying Nicolas Auguste de Harlay-Bonneuil, charged with making contact with the representatives of William III. At the end of negotiations he signed the Peace of Ryswick for France in 1697, the high point of his diplomacy. His success brought him an appointment as one of the private secretaries of the king. In his memoirs, Saint-Simon gives a good character of Callières, a gentleman with the courage to tell the truth to the King.

His great work begins with the maxim

"Every Christian Prince should have for a principal maxim not to employ arms to maintain and make proof of his rights, but after having tried and exhausted the route of Reason and of persuasion, and it is in his interest to join thereto as well those of benevolence, which is the surest of all ways to affirm and augment his power; but he must make use of good workers who know how to put good deeds in practice to gain him the hearts and minds of men, and it is in that principally in which consists the science of negotiation."

Today the opening of his second chapter has stronger resonances than ever, two centuries after it was published:

"One must consider that all the States of which Europe is composed, have among them necessary liaisons and commerce, with the result that one may look upon them as members of the same Republic, and that there may scarcely arrive a significant change in some of its members that is not capable of disturbing the tranquility of all the others".

At his death, still unmarried, he left a house in the rue Saint-Augustin filled with French, Italian and Dutch paintings, a large and well-chosen library, and the bulk of his estate to the poor of Paris.
