= Huis ter Nieuwburg =

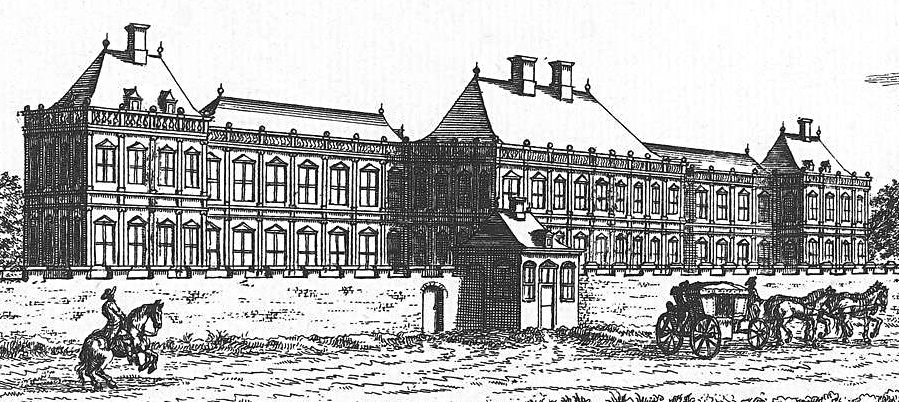
- Front view of the palace in 1665
- Interactive map of the Huis ter Nieuwburg area

General information
- Type: Palace
- Architectural style: French Classicism
- Location: Rijswijk, Dutch Republic
- Coordinates: 52.04898°N 4.327615°E
- Construction started: 1630
- Completed: 1636
- Demolished: 1790
- Client: Prince Frederick Henry
- Owner: Princes of Orange; Kings of Prussia

Technical details
- Structural system: Gardens of the French Renaissance

Design and construction
- Architect: Simon de la Vallée

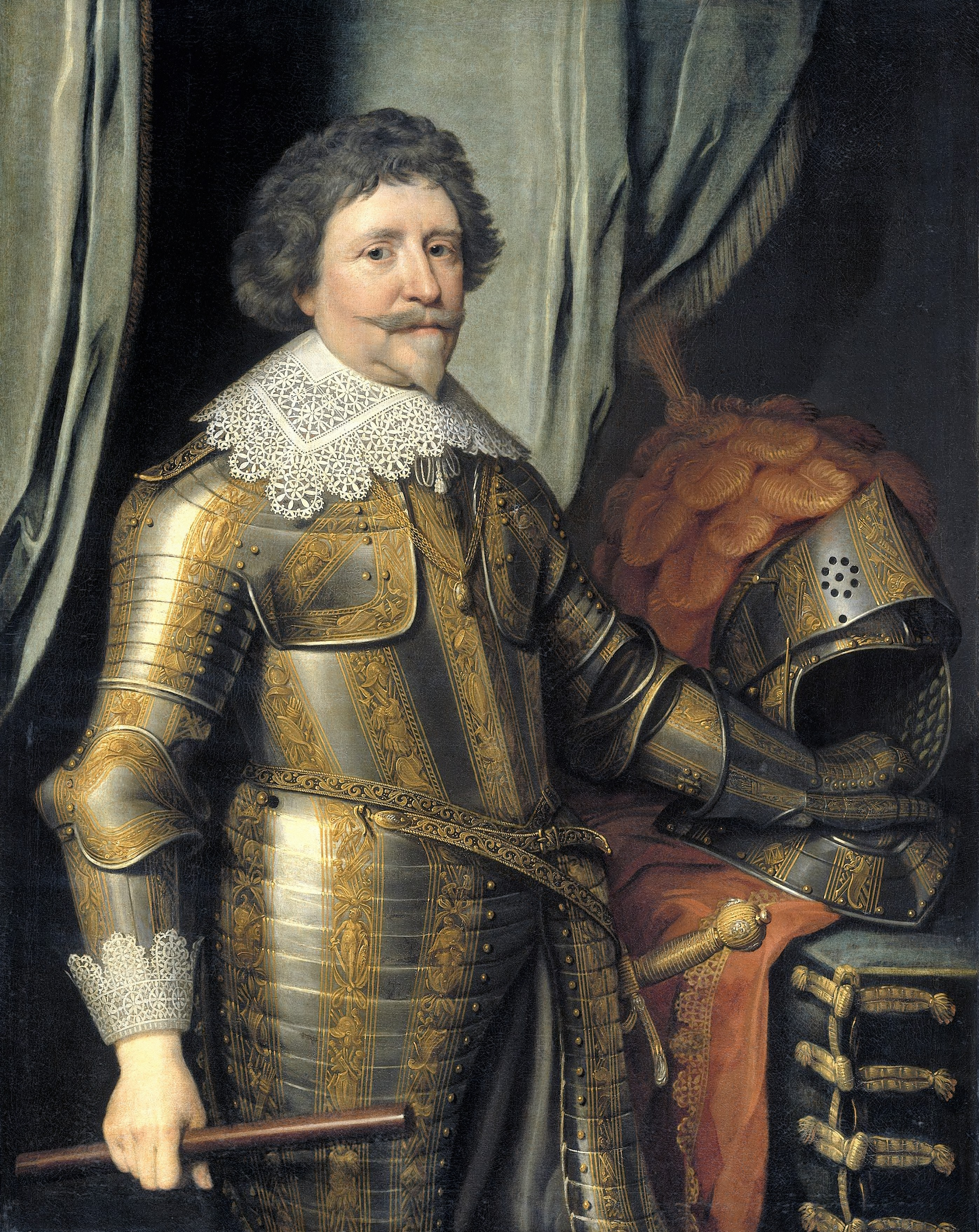
A portrait of Prince Frederick Henry by Michiel Jansz van Mierevelt.

Huis ter Nieuwburg or Huis ter Nieuburch ("House at New Borough") was a palace in Rijswijk, Holland, Dutch Republic. The symmetrical French Classicist building was probably designed by the Dutch architect Jacob van Campen together with Constantin Huygens and the prince himself. According to Slothouwer the designs were carried out by Arent van's Gravesande who was replaced by the French architect Simon de la Vallée in 1634. The palace was built between 1630 and 1636 for stadtholder Prince Frederick Henry.

The palace with gardens was the country house of the Princes of Orange for years, and it was used for the peace negotiations resulting in the Treaty of Ryswick in 1697. After the death of Stadtholder-king William III in 1702, the palace was inherited by the kings in Prussia, until it was given back to the Princes of Orange by Frederick the Great.

The gardens of the palace were formal French Renaissance gardens constructed in 1636. In front of the palace were trees and parterres enclosed by walls. Behind the palace was a larger garden with four rectangular ponds.

The building was demolished in 1790 after years of neglect. At present, the area is woodland known as the Rijswijkse Bos. The only reminders of the palace are two of the ponds and an obelisk, the Needle of Rijswijk, commemorating the peace treaty.

== Building ==
In 1630, Stadtholder Frederick Henry, Prince of Orange bought the old Huis ter Nieuwburg from Philibert Vernatti for ƒ30,000 (€13,613). The house was located in the Plaspolder, a polder in the village Rijswijk, in between the cities The Hague and Delft. At that time, The Hague was the political center of the Dutch Republic where the States-General assembled, and Delft was the city where Prince Frederick Henry was born and where his father William the Silent had his residence and was assassinated and buried in 1584.

Between 1630 and 1632, the Prince of Orange bought more land and two houses in the area surrounding the house in order to build a new country house on the location of Vernatti's old house. The project of the new Huis ter Nieuwburg was tendered in 1630. The first pavilions of the palace were finished in 1632 and its roof was completed in 1636. During his life, Prince Frederick Henry had built large houses in the latest styles in architecture and by the best available architects. It is probable that the French architect Simon de la Vallée had helped to carry out designs of this palace and its interiors.

The symmetrical building was designed in the architectural style of French Classicism. The plan of the large building also reflects the new ideas from the villa buildings of Andrea Palladio who influenced architects like van Jacob van Campen, Pieter Post and Pilip Vingboons. The corps de logis with the main chambers of the palace was positioned on the axis of symmetry. At the back of the corps de logis was a lodge looking out on the Nieuwe Kerk in Delft through a corridor along the axis in the garden. In this church is the mausoleum of his father William the Silent and the crypt where Prince Frederick Henry's parents, brother, and two daughters were buried at the time the palace was built. Both on the east and the west side of the corps de logis is a wing, perpendicular to the axis, with a pavilion at the end.

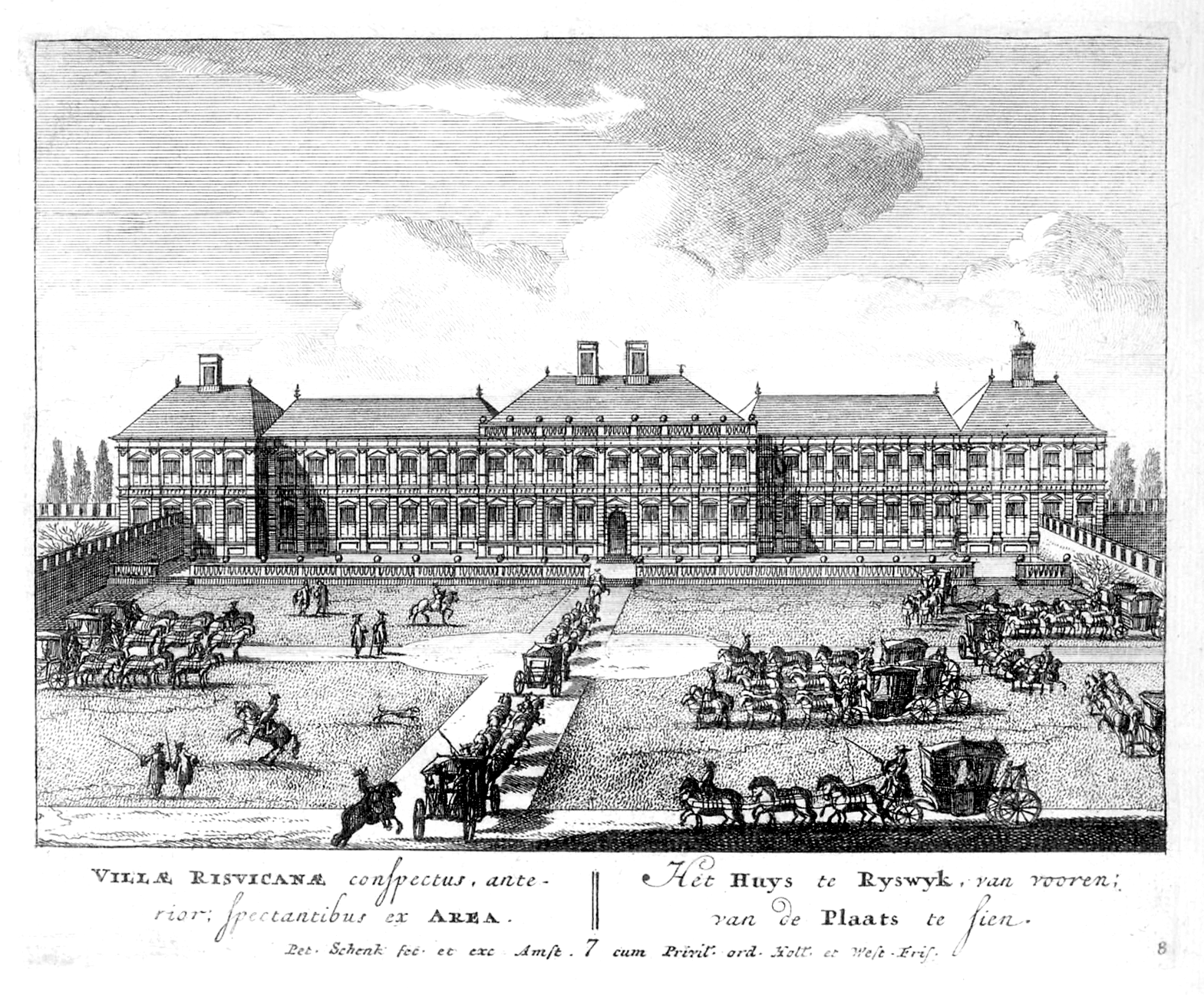
The symmetrical palace was finished in 1636; front view by Petrus Schenck

== Gardens ==
The geometric Late Renaissance gardens and ponds were constructed by 1636. They were carried out by André Mollet, son of the famous French garden architect Claude Mollet who served the French kings Henry IV and Louis XIII. They were illustrated as they had become fully developed and matured in Jan van Vianen's engraving after Peter Schenk the Elder, which records the grand diplomatic gathering that led to the Treaty of Ryswick, signed in the house. The entire garden was surrounded by a rectangle of canals that drained the ground and formed the equivalent of a moat; around its inner banks allées of trees isolated the pleasure grounds from the featureless agricultural landscape outside.

Entry was across one of three bridges and through a formal woodland or bocage, through which three drives were pierced: the central one led through a free-standing Doric portal—guarded by sentry-boxes on this occasion—that was centred on a pedimented central gate in the mock-battlemented wall that enclosed the paved and cobbled forecourt. Right and left of this axial entrance, reserved during the treaty negotiations for the Mediator, were matching unemphasised entrances—perhaps opened in the walling for the occasion—destined, as the engraving's legend specifies, for the French representatives on the right and for those of the Allies on the left; clearly, this will have avoided tense protocol confrontations over which coach would enter the cour d'honneur first.

The north front of the Huis with its paired corner pavilions was separated from the forecourt by a low balustraded terrace that created a privileged zone that protected the parade rooms from the immediate clatter of the courtyard and the inconvenient leavings of horses. For the duration of the negotiations, temporary brick walls had been erected to divide the entrance court from its flanking parterre gardens; in ordinary times, openings in the terrace balustrade and a few steps gave direct access to these gardens, where fruit trees were espaliered against the brick walls.

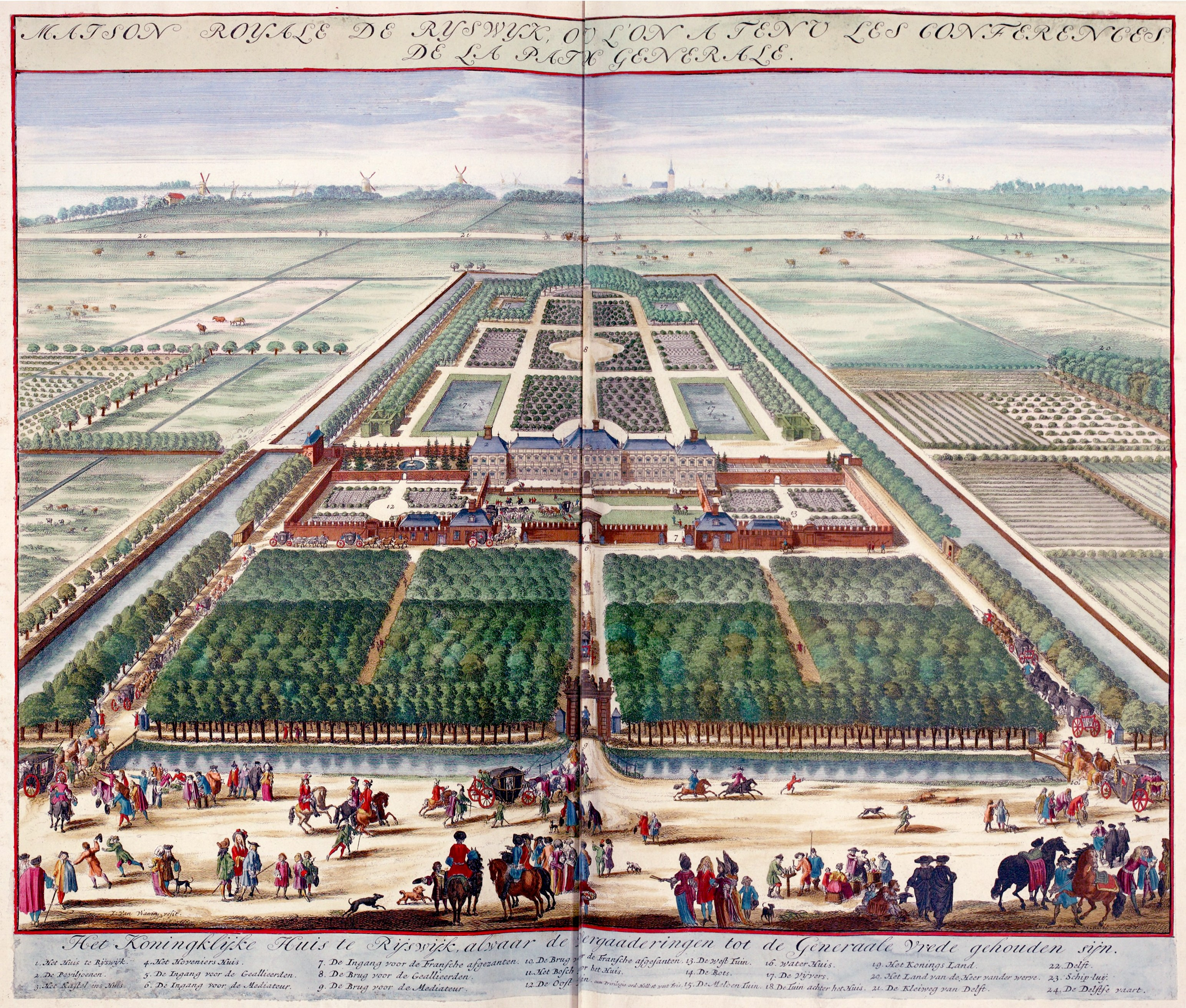
The palace and gardens during the negotiations of the Treaty of Ryswick in 1697, engraved by Jan van Vianen after Peter Schenck the Elder

The central axis continued through the central rooms of the corps de logis and was extended as a wide gravelled walk down the axis of the pleasure grounds, which it divided symmetrically on either side; at the far end, the enclosing narrow band of trees drew back in a semi-circular exedra that parted at the center to afford a view of the church steeple of Delft on the horizon, centred on the garden axis.

The grounds thus enclosed and divided featured a symmetrical suite of six parterres that were planted—rather than with the clipped patterns relieved with colored gravel of André Le Nôtre's Garden à la française manner—as formal bosquets of trees laid out quincunx-fashion and separated by wide gravelled walks. In the four outer corners of the grounds that were articulated by these shady sections were four rectangular ponds, the vijvers of which two survive today. At the outside front corners were a pair of mock fortifications with corner bastions all in tightly-clipped evergreens, entered by arched doorways.

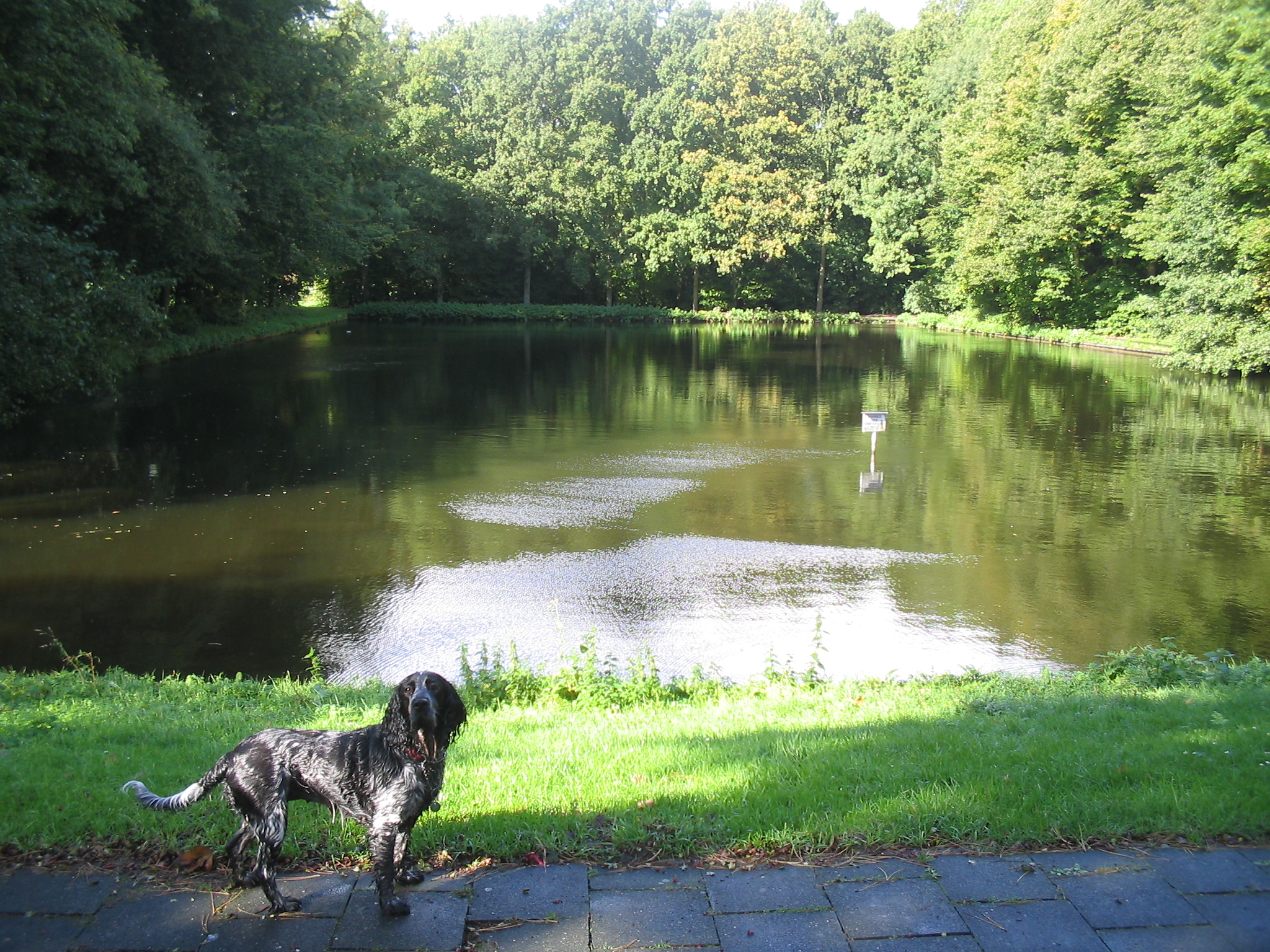
One of two ponds from the gardens of the palace in the Rijswijkse Bos

Two separate gardens enclosed by brick walls extended east and west of the end pavilions. The eastward one was planted with evergreens surrounding a circular central rockwork fountain, from which is derived its name De Rots, "The Rockery". The westward one was the De Meloen Tuin, the melon garden.

== Owners and tenants ==
The palace was built as a country house and used by the Princes of Orange, the stadtholders of six of the seven provinces of the Dutch Republic, and the de facto rulers of the country.

In 1697, the palace was used for the negotiations that lead to the Treaty of Ryswick. The treaty settled the Nine Years' War between France and the Grand Alliance of England, Spain, the Holy Roman Empire and the Dutch Republic.

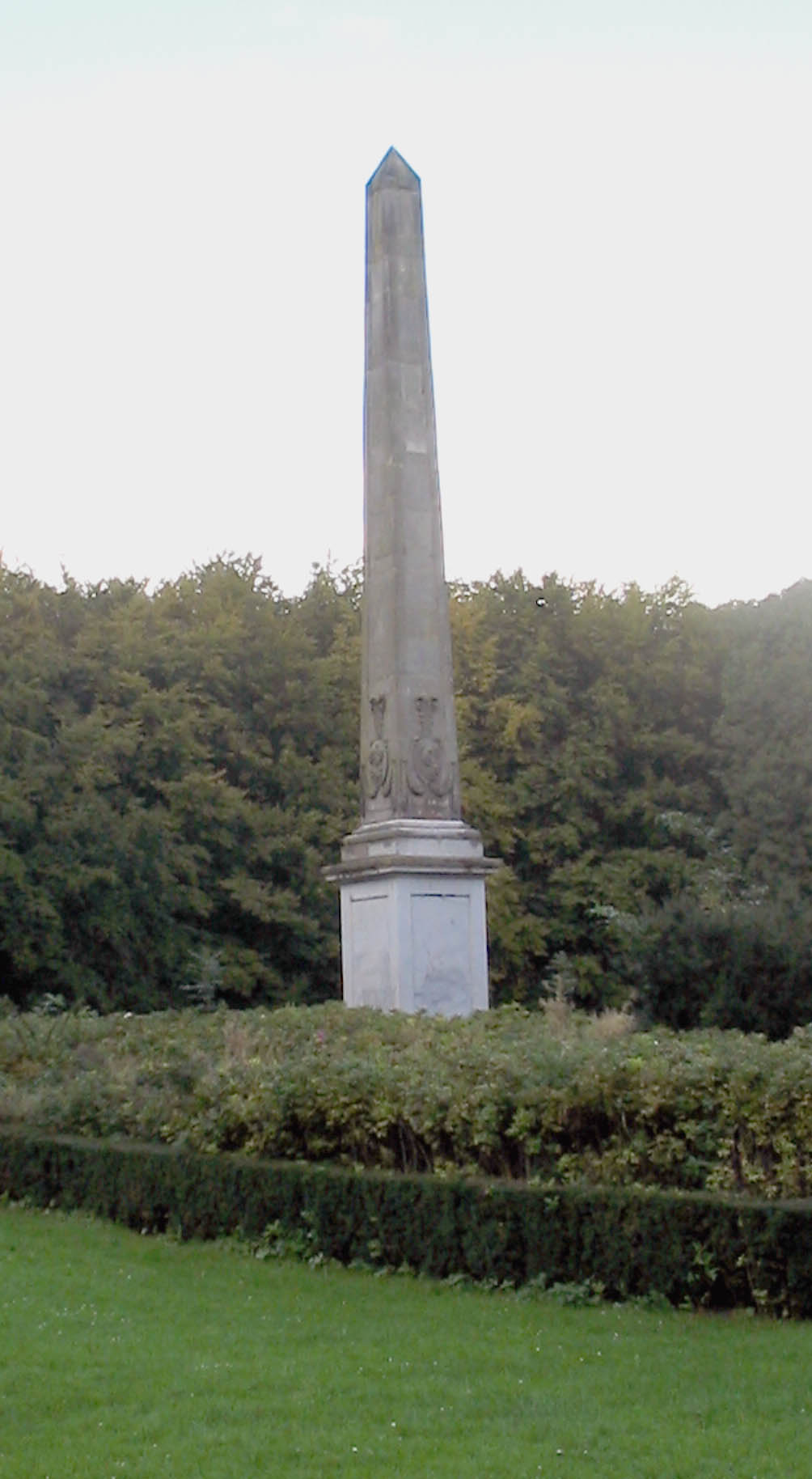
The Needle of Rijswijk, commemorating the Treaty of Ryswick of 1697

After the death of King William III of England, who was also the Prince of Orange, the house was under the supervision of the Nassause Domeinraad (English: "Domain Council of Nassau") from 1702 to 1732. After the inheritance of King William III was settled, the palace became the property of Frederick William I of Prussia in 1732. His successor, Frederick the Great, gave the palace back to William IV, Prince of Orange, as an act of friendship.

In 1753, the palace was rented to Count Golofkin, ambassador for Tsarina Elizabeth of Russia.

== Demolition ==
In 1789, the architect P.W. Schonk advised William V, Prince of Orange to demolish the palace, because it had been neglected for years. Also he advised that the money raised by selling properties and real estate be used for a monument for the Treaty of Ryswick. Following this advice, the palace was demolished in 1790 and the stables and the coach-house were sold in 1793. The Needle of Rijswijk was built in 1792 to 1794 to commemorate the peace treaty.

At present, the area around the obelisk is woodland known as the Rijswijkse Bos, which is open to the public. The only other reminders of Huis ter Nieuwburg are two rectangular ponds from the French gardens, now enclosed in woodland.

Rijswijk Museum has engravings, medals, and books relating to the Treaty of Ryswick and paintings of the palace in its collection.
