= Sion, Netherlands =

Sion
- Buurtschap
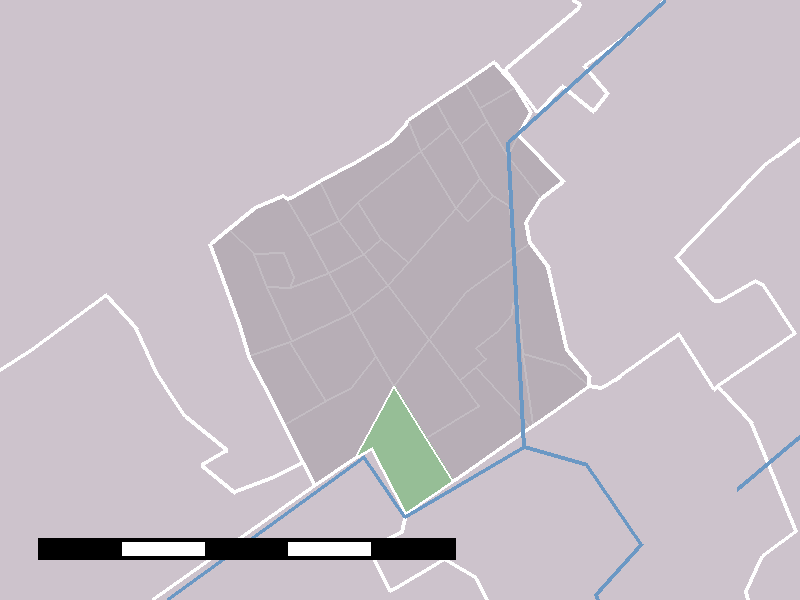
- locatie Sion in Rijswijk
- Coordinates: 52°1′7″N 4°19′30″E
- Country: Netherlands
- Province: South Holland
- Municipality: Rijswijk

Area
  - Total: 0.79 km^{2} (0.31 sq mi)

Population (2007)
  - Total: 190

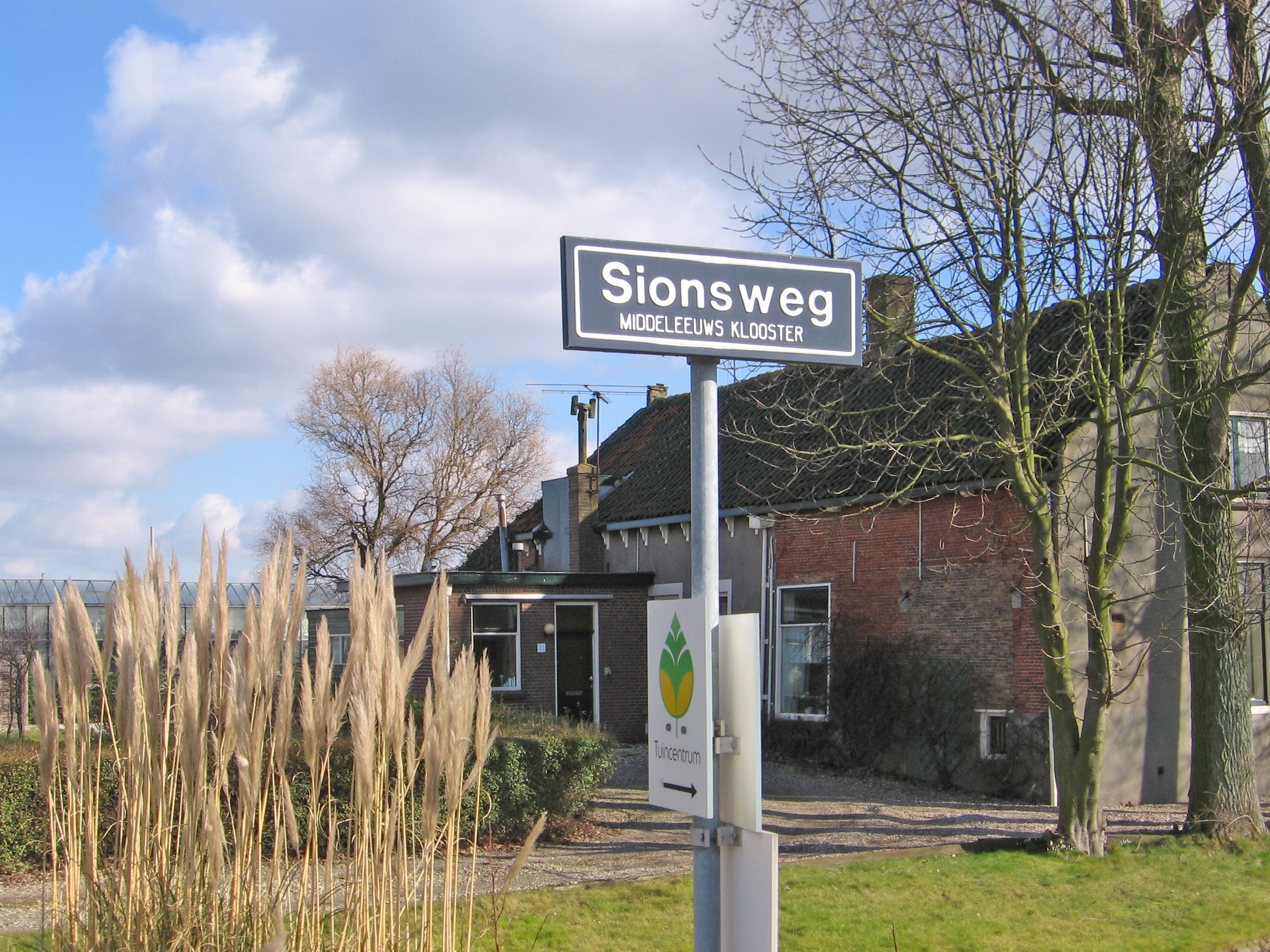
Road sign in Sion, with the coach house of the former estate in the background.

Sion is a hamlet in the Dutch municipality of Rijswijk. It is located on the border with Delft.

In 1345, the monastery Sancta Maria in Monte Sion was built in this area. It was demolished on the orders of the city of Delft in 1572, when Spanish troops approached the city, and was never rebuilt. In the 17th century, an estate was built on the grounds of the former monastery, and in the 19th century, it was divided into small parts and made into farms.

Since 2013, Rijswijk has started construction of several new neighborhoods in the area formerly called Sion.
