= Peace of Ryswick =

1697 peace treaties

Treaty of Peace between France and Spain; Treaty of Peace between France and England; Suspension of Armed Conflict in Germany between France and the Holy Roman Empire; Treaty of Peace and Commerce between France and the Dutch Republic; Separate Article for the Dutch Republic; Treaty of Peace between France and the Holy Roman Empire
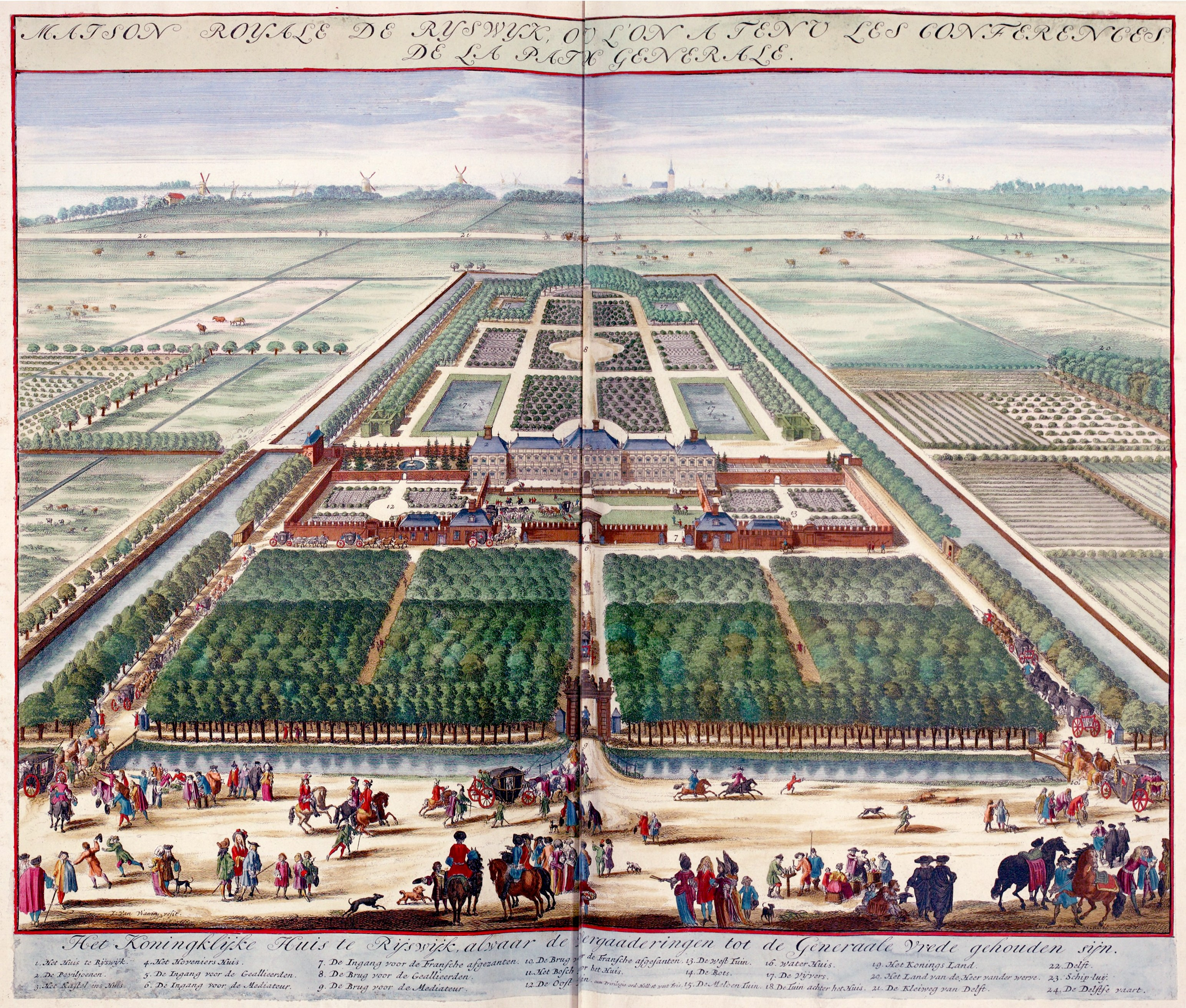
- Huis ter Nieuwburg, location for the negotiations
- Context: End of the 1689–1697 Nine Years War; King William's War
- Signed: 20 September 1697
- Location: Rijswijk
- Negotiators: Baron Lilliënrot
- Signatories: (Dutch Republic) Heinsius; van Weede; van Haren; (Spain) Tirimont; de Quiros; (Kingdom of France) Verjus; Callières; Bonneuil; (Holy Roman Empire) Kaunitz; Seilern; Stratman; (Kingdom of England) Pembroke; Villiers; Williamson
- Parties: France; Dutch Republic; England; Spain; Holy Roman Empire
- Language: French

The Peace of Ryswick, or Rijswijk, were a series of treaties signed in the Dutch city of Rijswijk between 20 September and 30 October 1697. They ended the 1688 to 1697 Nine Years' War between France and the Grand Alliance, which included the Dutch Republic, the Holy Roman Empire, England, Scotland, and Spain.

One of a series of wars fought by Louis XIV of France between 1666 and 1714, neither side was able to make significant territorial gains. By 1695, the huge financial costs, coupled with widespread famine and economic dislocation, meant both sides needed peace. Negotiations were delayed by the question of who would inherit the Spanish Empire from the childless and terminally ill Charles II of Spain, the closest heirs being Louis and Emperor Leopold I.

Since Louis could not impose his preferred solution, he refused to discuss the issue, while Leopold refused to sign without its inclusion. He finally did so with great reluctance on 30 October 1697, but the Peace was generally viewed as a truce; Charles' death in 1700 led to the War of the Spanish Succession.

In Europe and North America, the terms essentially restored the position prevailing before the war, though Spain recognized French control of the island of Tortuga and the western portion of Hispaniola (Saint-Domingue). In Europe, France evacuated several territories it had occupied since the 1679 Treaty of Nijmegen, including Freiburg, Breisach and the Duchy of Lorraine; conversely, it retained Strasbourg.

== Background ==
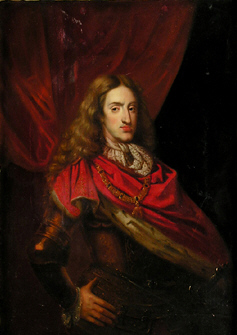
Charles II (1665–1700); his inheritance overshadowed negotiations.

The Nine Years' War was financially crippling for its participants, partly because armies increased in size from an average of 25,000 in 1648 to over 100,000 by 1697. This was unsustainable for pre-industrial economies; the war absorbed 80% of English state revenue in the period, while the huge manpower commitments badly affected the economy.

The 1690s also marked the coldest point of the so-called Little Ice Age, a period of cold and wet weather affecting Europe in the second half of the 17th century. Harvests failed throughout Europe in 1695, 1696, 1698 and 1699; in Scotland and parts of Northern Europe, an estimated 5–15% of the population starved to death.

Although fighting largely ended in Europe after 1695, the subsidiary conflict known as King William's War continued in the Americas. A French fleet arrived in the Caribbean in early 1697, threatening the Spanish treasure fleet, and English possessions in the West Indies. England occupied the French colony of Acadia, while the French repulsed attacks on Quebec, captured York Factory, and caused substantial damage to the New England economy.

== Negotiations ==
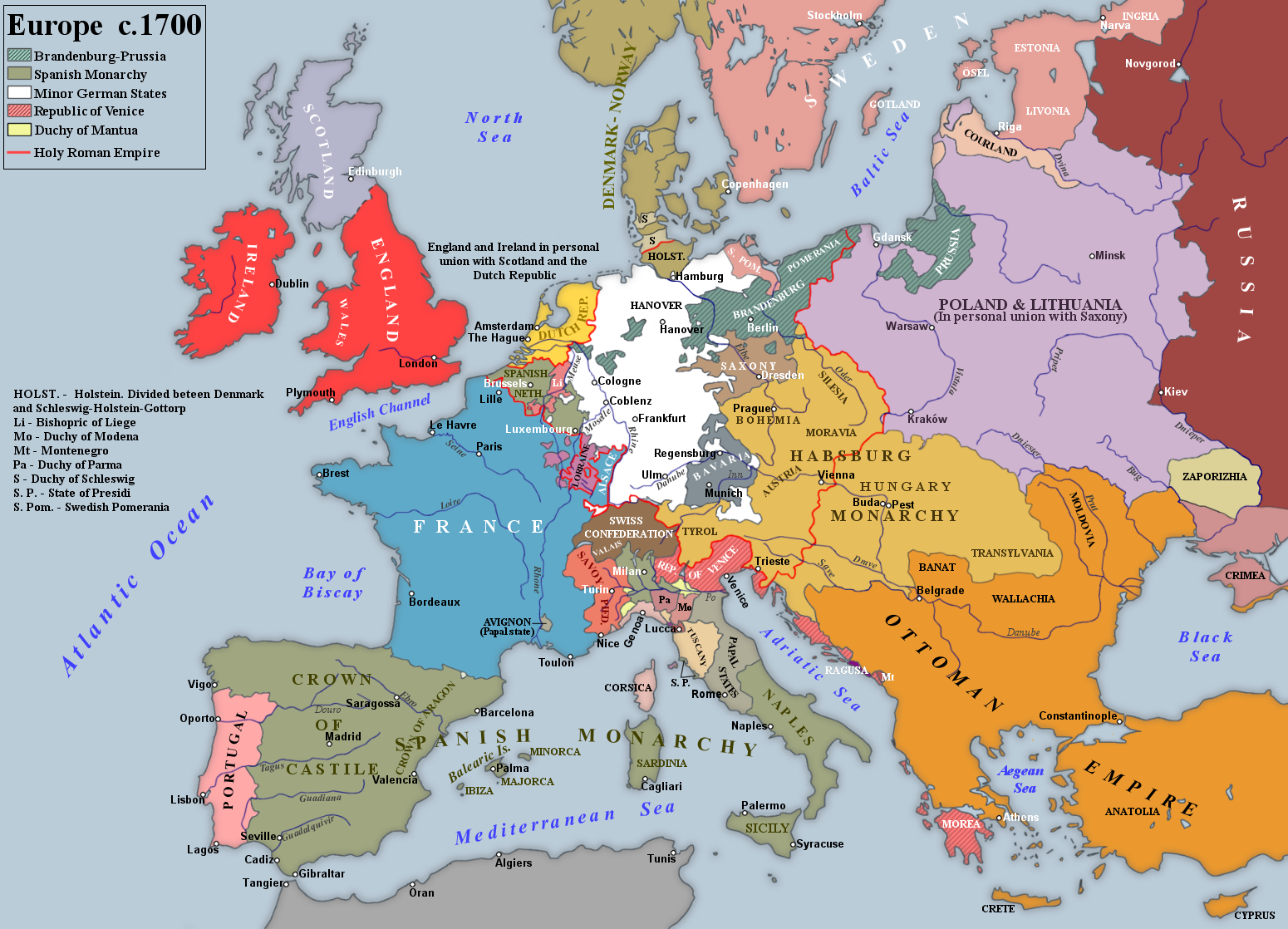
Europe after the Treaty of Ryswick, c. 1700

Talks were dominated by the question of the Spanish succession, one of the central issues in European politics during the preceding three decades. By 1696, it had become apparent that Charles II of Spain was unlikely to produce an heir, and the leading claimants to his inheritance included King Louis XIV and Emperor Leopold I. The Spanish Empire remained a vast global confederation; in addition to Spain, its territories included large parts of Italy, the Spanish Netherlands, the Philippines, and much of the Americas. Acquisition of these territories by either France or Austria would change the European balance of power.

Recognising he was not strong enough to impose his preferred solution to the Spanish question, Louis wanted to prevent its discussion, by dividing the Grand Alliance and isolating Leopold. In the 1696 Treaty of Turin he made a separate peace with the Duchy of Savoy. Other concessions were the return of the Duchy of Luxemburg to Spain; considerably larger than the modern state, it was essential to Dutch security. Louis also agreed to recognise William III as monarch of England and Scotland, rather than the exiled James II.

Formal discussions between the delegations were held in the Huis ter Nieuwburg at Ryswick, mediated by Swedish diplomat and soldier Baron Lilliënrot. Many members of the Empire, such as Baden and Bavaria, sent representatives, although they were not party to the treaties. Talks proceeded slowly; Leopold habitually avoided making decisions until absolutely necessary, and since the terms failed to address the inheritance question, he would only agree to a ceasefire. One of the Spanish negotiators, Bernardo de Quiros, ignored instructions from Madrid to make peace at any price, and agreed to support this demand. Although the British initially preferred to continue fighting, William became anxious to finalise peace. William and Louis appointed the Earl of Portland and Marshal Louis-François de Boufflers as their personal representatives; they met privately outside Brussels in June 1697, and quickly finalised terms, with de Quiros being overruled.

The peace consisted of a number of separate agreements: on 20 September 1697, France signed Treaties of Peace with Spain and England, a Ceasefire with the Holy Roman Empire, and on 21 September, a Treaty of Peace and Commerce with the Dutch Republic. When Charles fell seriously ill, Leopold used it as an excuse to delay signing; one frustrated negotiator claimed "it would be a shorter way to knock (Charles) on the head, rather than all Europe be kept in suspense." The Spanish king recovered, while William threatened to dissolve the Alliance if Leopold did not sign before 1 November; he finally did so on 30 October.

== Treaties ==
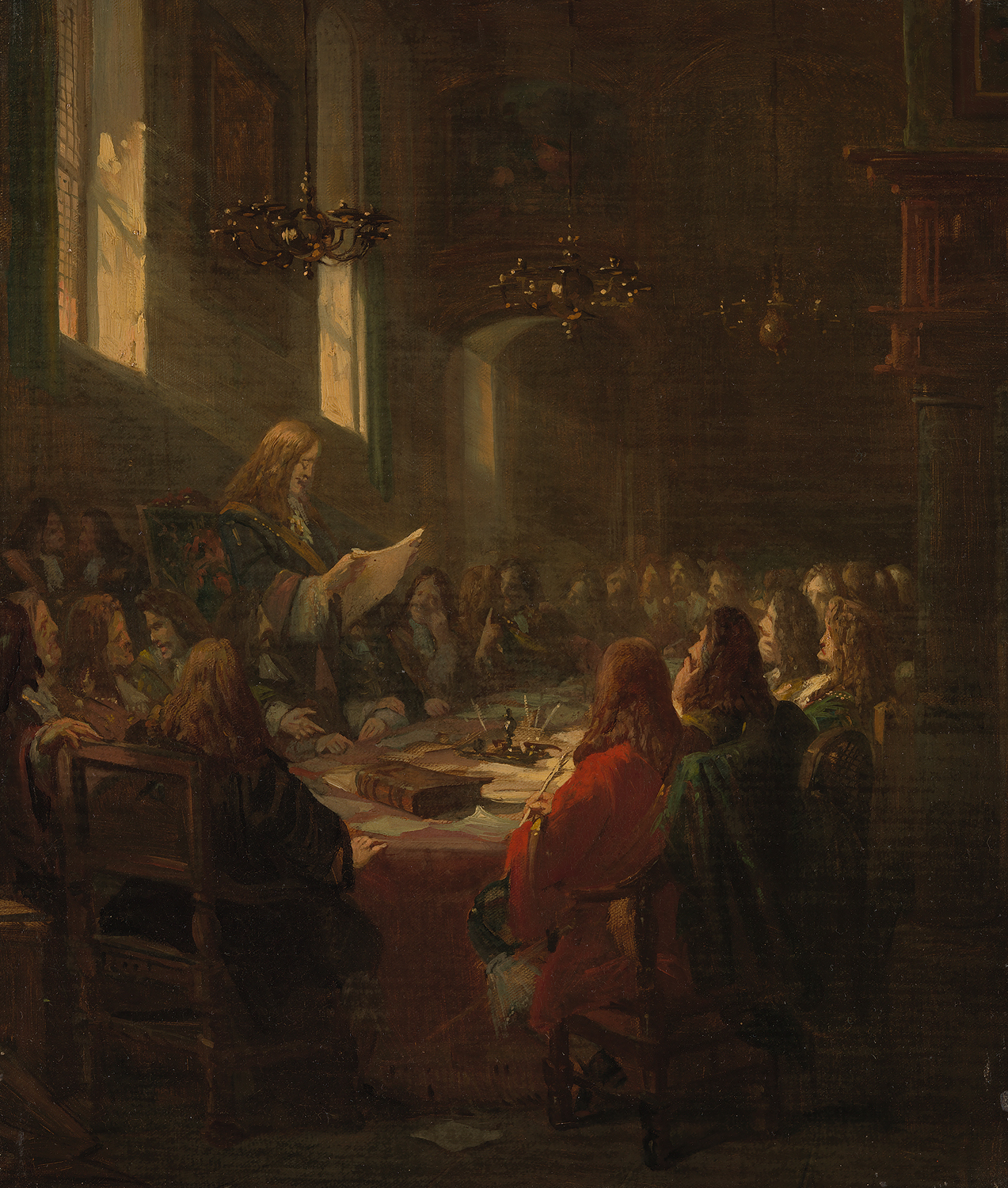
The Peace of Ryswick 1697, by Barend Wijnveld

Treaties of Ryswick and related treaties
Date (New Style / (Old Style))	Treaty name	Anti-French side	French side	Texts
29 August 1696	Peace Treaty of Turin	Savoy	France	English (p. 196–208)
20 September 1697 (10 September 1697)	Peace Treaty of Ryswick	Habsburg Spain	France	English (p. 151–172)
20 September 1697 (10 September 1697)	Peace Treaty of Ryswick	England & Scotland	France	English (p. 127–138), Spanish (p. 8–15)
20 September 1697 (10 September 1697)	Peace Treaty of Ryswick	Dutch Republic	France	English (p. 214–226), French
30 October 1697 (20 October 1697)	Peace Treaty of Ryswick	Holy Roman Empire	France	English (p. 247–284), German, Spanish (p. 21–41)

== Provisions ==
The treaty essentially restored the map of Western Europe to that agreed by the 1679 Treaty of Nijmegen; France kept Strasbourg, the strategic key to Alsace, but returned other territories occupied or captured since then, including Freiburg, Breisach, Philippsburg and the Duchy of Lorraine to the Holy Roman Empire. French forces also evacuated Catalonia, Luxembourg, Mons and Kortrijk in the Spanish Netherlands. Louis recognised William as king, withdrew support from the Jacobites, and abandoned claims to the Electorate of Cologne, and the Electoral Palatinate.

In North America, positions returned to those prevailing before the war, with France regaining Acadia, although in reality low-level conflict persisted around the boundaries. Conversely, in the Caribbean Spain recognized French control of the western portion of Hispaniola and the island of Tortuga; France had in fact established its colony of Saint-Domingue years earlier. Meanwhile, the Dutch returned the colony of Pondichéry in India to France.

== Aftermath ==
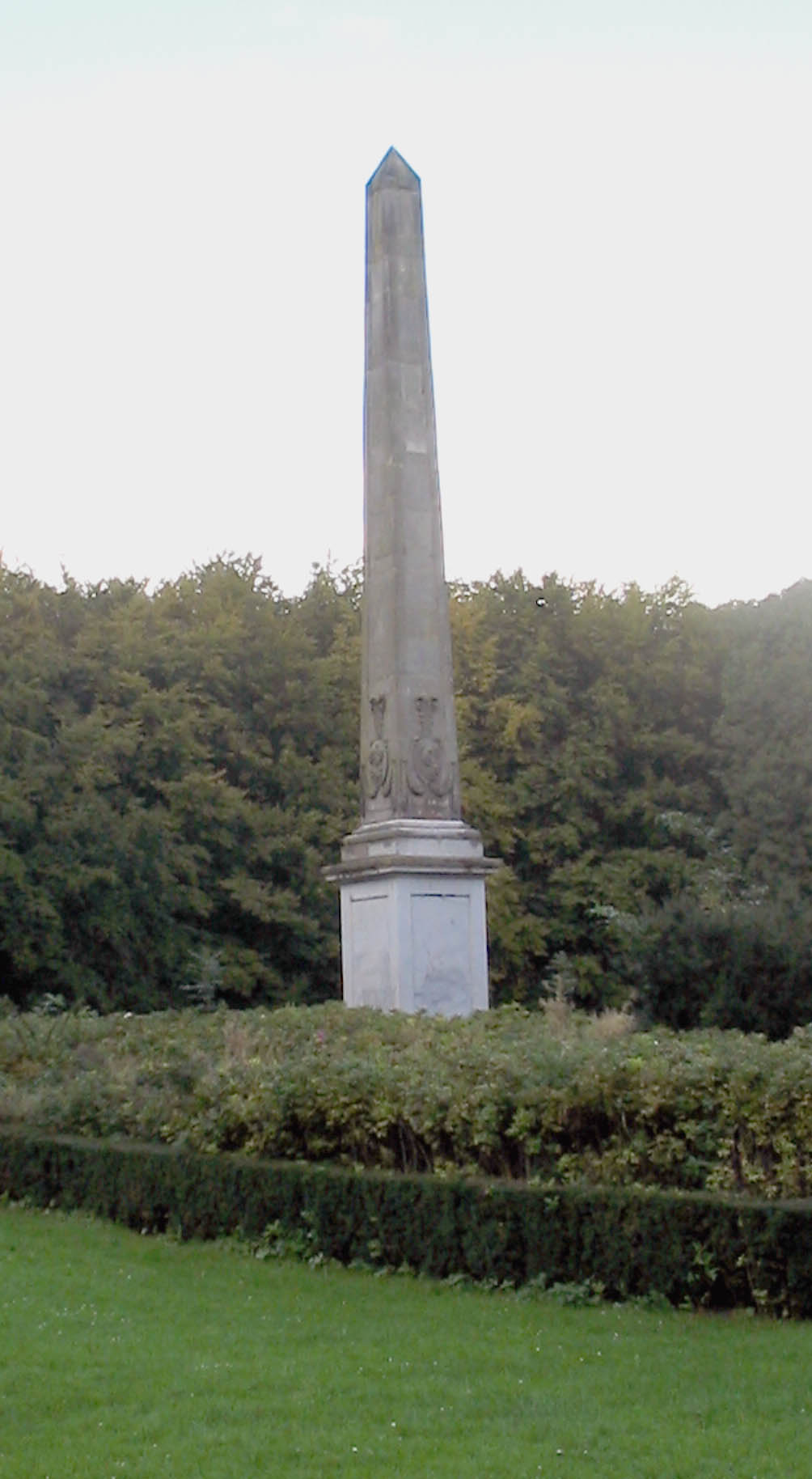
The Needle of Rijswijk erected during 1792–1794

All sides interpreted Ryswick to be a truce, and expected conflict to resume when Charles died. The war demonstrated that France could no longer impose its objectives without allies. Louis therefore adopted a dual approach of a diplomatic offensive to seek support, while keeping the French Army on a war footing. The increase in Habsburg power following victory in the Great Turkish War with the signing of the Treaty of Karlowitz in 1699 was offset by the growing independence of states like Bavaria, which looked to Louis, rather than Leopold, for support.

The war diverted resources from both the Dutch and French navies, and although the Dutch still dominated the Far East trade, Ryswick marked a turning point in England's rise as a global maritime power. Previously focused on the Levant, its mercantile interests began challenging Spanish and Portuguese control of the Americas, where the French struggled to compete. The huge debts accumulated by the Dutch weakened their economy, while London replaced Amsterdam as the commercial centre of Europe. The Nine Years' War, together with the subsequent War of the Spanish Succession (1701–1714), marked the end of the Dutch Golden Age.

At the same time, the determination of the Tory majority in Parliament to reduce costs meant that by 1699, the English army had been reduced to less than 7,000 men. This seriously undermined William's ability to negotiate on equal terms with France, and despite his intense mistrust, he co-operated with Louis in an attempt to agree a diplomatic solution to the Spanish succession. The so-called Partition Treaties of The Hague in 1698 and London in 1700 ultimately failed to prevent the outbreak of war between the two kingdoms.

After James II died in 1701, Louis XIV proclaimed his son Prince James to be the rightful king of England, despite the treaty.

== Sources ==
- Treaty of Ryswick, English translation
- Childs, John (1991). The Nine Years' War and the British Army, 1688–1697: The Operations in the Low Countries (2013 ed.). Manchester University Press. ISBN 978-0719089961.
- Chisholm, Hugh, ed. (1911). "Ryswick, Treaty of" . Encyclopædia Britannica. Vol. 23 (11th ed.). Cambridge University Press. p. 952.
- Falkner, James (2015). The War of the Spanish Succession 1701–1714. Pen and Sword. ISBN 978-1473872905.
- Frey, Linda; Frey, Marsha (1995). The Treaties of the War of the Spanish Succession: An Historical and Critical Dictionary. Greenwood. ISBN 978-0313278846.
- Gregg, Edward (1980). Queen Anne (Revised) (The English Monarchs Series) (2001 ed.). Yale University Press. ISBN 978-0300090246.
- Grenier, John (19 November 2015). "King William's War; New England's Mournful Decade". Historynet.
- Israel, Fred (1967). Major Peace Treaties of Modern History, 1648–1967 Volume I (2001 ed.). Chelsea House Publications. ISBN 978-0791066607.
- Meerts, Paul Wilson (2014). Diplomatic negotiation: Essence and Evolution (PhD). Leiden University. hdl:1887/29596.
- Morgan, WT (1931). "Economic Aspects of the Negotiations at Ryswick". Transactions of the Royal Historical Society. 14: 225–249. doi:10.2307/3678514. JSTOR 3678514. S2CID 153412732.
- Onnekink, David (2018). Martell, Gordon (ed.). The Treaty of Ryswick in The Encyclopedia of Diplomacy Volume III. Wiley Blackwell. ISBN 978-1118887912.
- Storrs, Christopher (2006). The Resilience of the Spanish Monarchy 1665–1700. OUP Oxford. ISBN 978-0199246373.
- SW (1732). A General Collection of Treatys, Volume I. Knapton.
- Szechi, Daniel (1994). The Jacobites: Britain and Europe, 1688–1788. Manchester University Press. ISBN 978-0719037740.
- Thomson, Mark (1968). William III and Louis XIV; Essays 1680–1720. Liverpool University Press.
- White, ID (2011). Lynch, M (ed.). Rural Settlement 1500–1770 in The Oxford Companion to Scottish History. OUP. ISBN 978-0199693054.
