= Treaty of Turin (1696) =

1696 peace treaty between France and the Duchy of Savoy

The Acts and Negotiations of the Peace concluded between the French King and the Duke of Savoy.
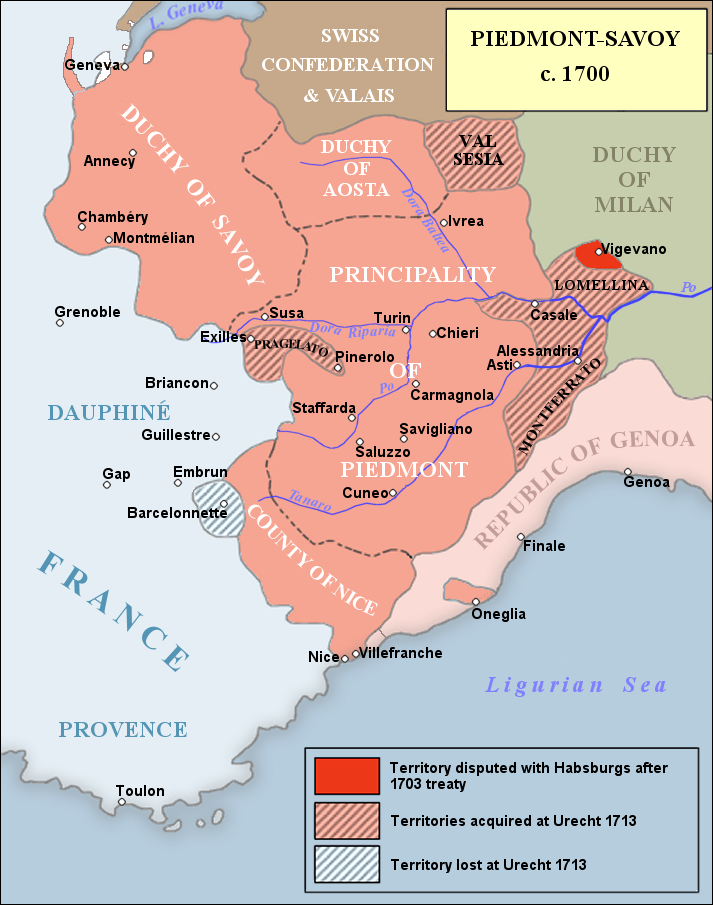
- Savoy, c. 1700
- Context: Savoy exits the Nine Years War
- Signed: 29 August 1696
- Location: Turin
- Parties: France; Duchy of Savoy

The Treaty of Turin, signed on 29 August 1696 by Louis XIV of France and Victor Amadeus II of Sardinia, ended the latter's involvement in the Nine Years' War.

By signing a separate peace with Louis XIV, Victor Amadeus left the Grand Alliance, an anti-French coalition formed on 20 December 1689 by England, the Dutch Republic, and Emperor Leopold.

It was followed on 7 October 1696 with the Convention of Vigevano in which France, Savoy, Leopold and Spain agreed a general ceasefire in Italy. The Treaty of Turin was made part of the 1697 Treaty of Ryswick.

== Background ==
Northern Italy provided access to the vulnerable southern borders of both France and Austria, making Milan and the Duchy of Savoy essential to their security. (Note: The Duchy of Milan was part of the Holy Roman Empire but a possession of the King of Spain.) In 1631, France annexed Pinerolo in Piedmont and occupied Casale Monferrato, while much of their territory was on the northern side of the Alps in modern France. As a result, most viewed Savoy as a French satellite state.

During the 1688-89 Nine Years' War between France and the Grand Alliance, Savoy held the key to France's vulnerable southern borders. This concern was heightened by an ongoing Huguenot Camisard revolt in the south west, while the Allies began recruiting support among the Waldensians, a Protestant sect in the Swiss Canton of Vaud, persecuted by both Savoy and France. By summer 1690, it was clear that Savoy could not avoid involvement on one side or the other.

Victor Amadeus II ultimately decided in favour of the Alliance, hoping to regain Pinerolo and Casale, which controlled access to his capital, Turin. Defeated by the French at Staffarda in August 1690, his duchy was only saved by receiving reinforcements from Spain, Bavaria and Brandenburg-Prussia. In 1692, Victor Amadeus made a short-lived invasion of the Dauphiné, but the war was financially crippling for participants. Crop failures in France and northern Italy between 1693 and 1695, widespread famine was caused, with Piedmont being one of the worst affected areas.

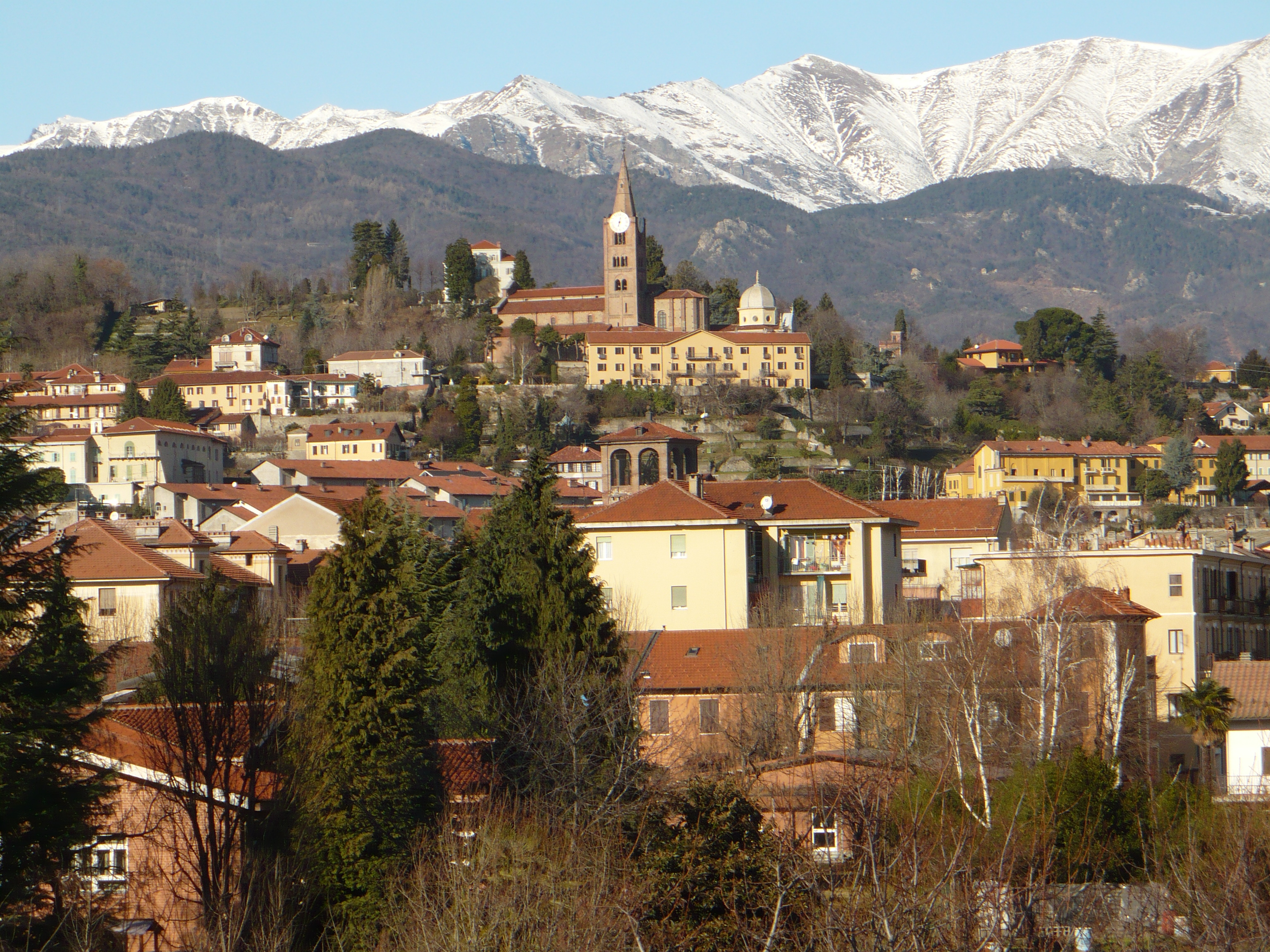
Pinerolo, whose recovery was a primary objective for Savoy.

In October 1693, Victor Amadeus was defeated at Marsaglia, while Leopold I now claimed Casale as an Imperial possession. This meant replacing the French would not benefit Savoy, and in November 1694, Victor Amadeus intensified informal talks with Louis XIV. In early 1695, France secretly agreed to surrender Casale if its defences were destroyed, (Note: France purchased Casale from the Duke of Mantua in 1678; the legal fiction was that it was now returned, with Victor Amadeus representing Mantua.) and in July Victor Amadeus took possession. With the Allies increasingly suspicious, treaty negotiations were conducted in secret between the Comte de Tessé and Savoy's senior diplomat, the Marquis de St-Thomas.

== Provisions ==
All Savoyard territories occupied by France would be returned, including Pinerolo after its fortifications had been destroyed, and Savoyard Protestants would be prevented from supporting French Camisard rebels. Victor Amadeus's longstime French-born mistress, Jeanne Baptiste d'Albert de Luynes, helped broker the marriage of his eldest daughter, Marie Adélaïde of Savoy, to Louis's grandson, the Duke of Burgundy. That increased Savoy's status within Europe, and a series of deaths in the French royal family meant that Marie Adélaïde's younger son would succeed his great-grandfather in 1715 as Louis XV.

Terms were finally agreed by the end of June, but the treaty was only signed on 29 August to allow Bavaria, Brandenburg-Prussia and Spain to withdraw their contingents from the forces outside Pinerolo.

== Aftermath ==
The most controversial clause was the agreement by Victor Amadeus to help France compel the Allies to agree a truce. In September 1696, a combined Savoyard-French army besieged Valenza, then part of the Duchy of Milan. On 7 October, France, Savoy, Emperor Leopold and Spain (Note: Spain was involved as Charles II was also Duke of Milan.) signed the Convention of Vigevano, establishing an armistice. The Nine Years War was formally ended by the 1697 Treaty of Ryswick which incorporated the Treaty of Turin.

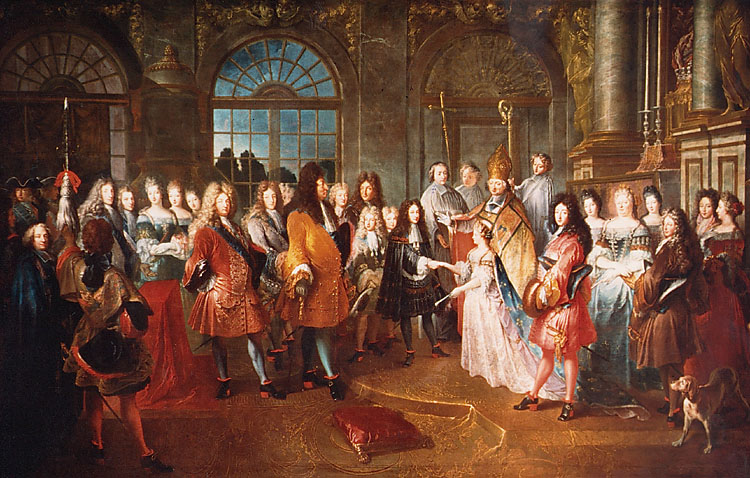
The wedding of Louis, Duke of Burgundy and Marie-Adélaïde, daughter of Victor Amadeus

By splitting the Allies, Savoy's defection enabled Louis to obtain better terms at Ryswick, and although France relinquished Pinerolo, Savoyard territories in Transalpine France were almost impossible to defend, and occupied again between 1704 and 1714. Victor Amadeus recovered Pinerolo and Casale, while his daughter's marriage enhanced Savoy's position on the European stage. The cost was a devastated and impoverished country, and "a reputation for...cynical self-interest he would never shake off, (that) earned the enmity of his former allies but not the friendship of Louis XIV".

== Sources ==
- Jacques, Bernard; The acts and negotiations, together with the particular articles at large of the general peace, concluded at Ryswick, by the most illustrious confederates with the French king to which is premised, the negotiations and articles of the peace, concluded at Turin, between the same prince and the Duke of Savoy; (http://name.umdl.umich.edu/A27483.0001.001)
- Léoutre, Marie M (2018). Serving France, Ireland and England: Ruvigny, Earl of Galway, 1648–1720 (Kindle ed.). Routledge. ISBN 978-1138207196.
- Nolan, Cathal (2008). Wars of the Age of Louis XIV, 1650-1715: An Encyclopedia of Global Warfare and Civilization. Greenwood Publishing. ISBN 978-0313330469.
- Storrs, Christopher (2008). War, Diplomacy and the Rise of Savoy, 1690–1720. Cambridge University Press. ISBN 978-0521038294.
- Symcox, Geoffrey (1983). Victor Amadeus II: Absolutism in the Savoyard State, 1675-1730. University of California Press. ISBN 0520049748.
- Williams, Noel E (1909). A Rose of Savoy: Marie Adelaide of Savoy, Duchesse De Bourgogne, Mother of Louis XV (2018 ed.). Forgotten Books. ISBN 1332191908.
- Young, William (2004). International Politics and Warfare in the Age of Louis XIV and Peter the Great. iUniverse. ISBN 0595329926.
