= Rijswijk =

Rijswijk Ryswick
- Town and municipality
- Gemeente Rijswijk
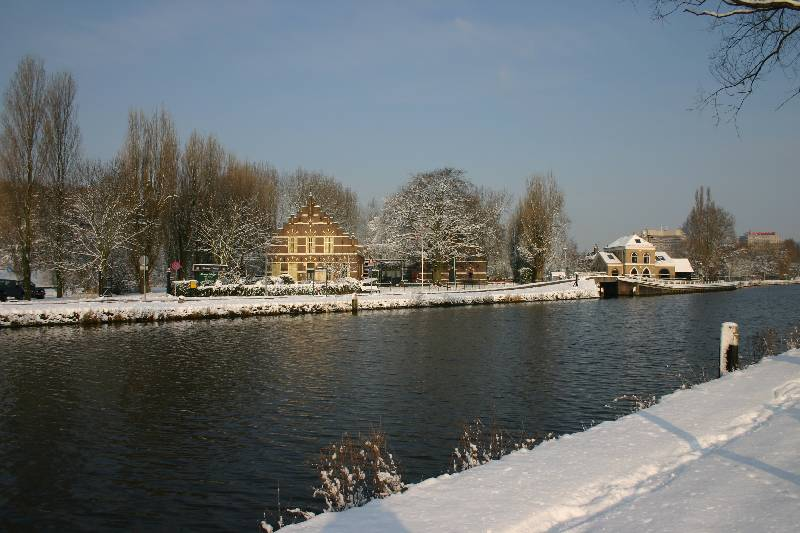
- Jaagpad street in Rijswijk

- Flag Coat of arms

- Location in South Holland
- Coordinates: 52°2′N 4°19′E
- Country: Netherlands
- Province: South Holland

Government
  - Body: Municipal council
  - Mayor: Huri Sahin

Area
  - Total: 14.49 km^{2} (5.59 sq mi)
  - Land: 13.96 km^{2} (5.39 sq mi)
  - Water: 0.53 km^{2} (0.20 sq mi)
- Elevation: 0 m (0 ft)

Population (January 2021)
  - Total: 59,642
  - Density: 3,956/km^{2} (10,250/sq mi)
- Demonym: Rijswijker
- Time zone: UTC+1 (CET)
  - Summer (DST): UTC+2 (CEST)
- Postcode: 2280–2289
- Area code: 070
- Website: www.rijswijk.nl

Rijswijk (Dutch: [ˈrɛisʋɛik]), formerly known as Ryswick (/ˈrɪzwɪk/ RIZ-wik) in English, is a town and municipality in the western Netherlands, in the province of South Holland. Its population was 59,642 in 2024, and it has an area of 14.49 km^{2} (5.59 sq mi), 0.53 km^{2} (0.20 sq mi) of which is water.

The municipality also includes the former hamlets of 't Haantje and Sion, currently also known as Rijswijk Buiten.

== Demographics ==
62% Dutch background, 38% No Dutch background.

== History ==
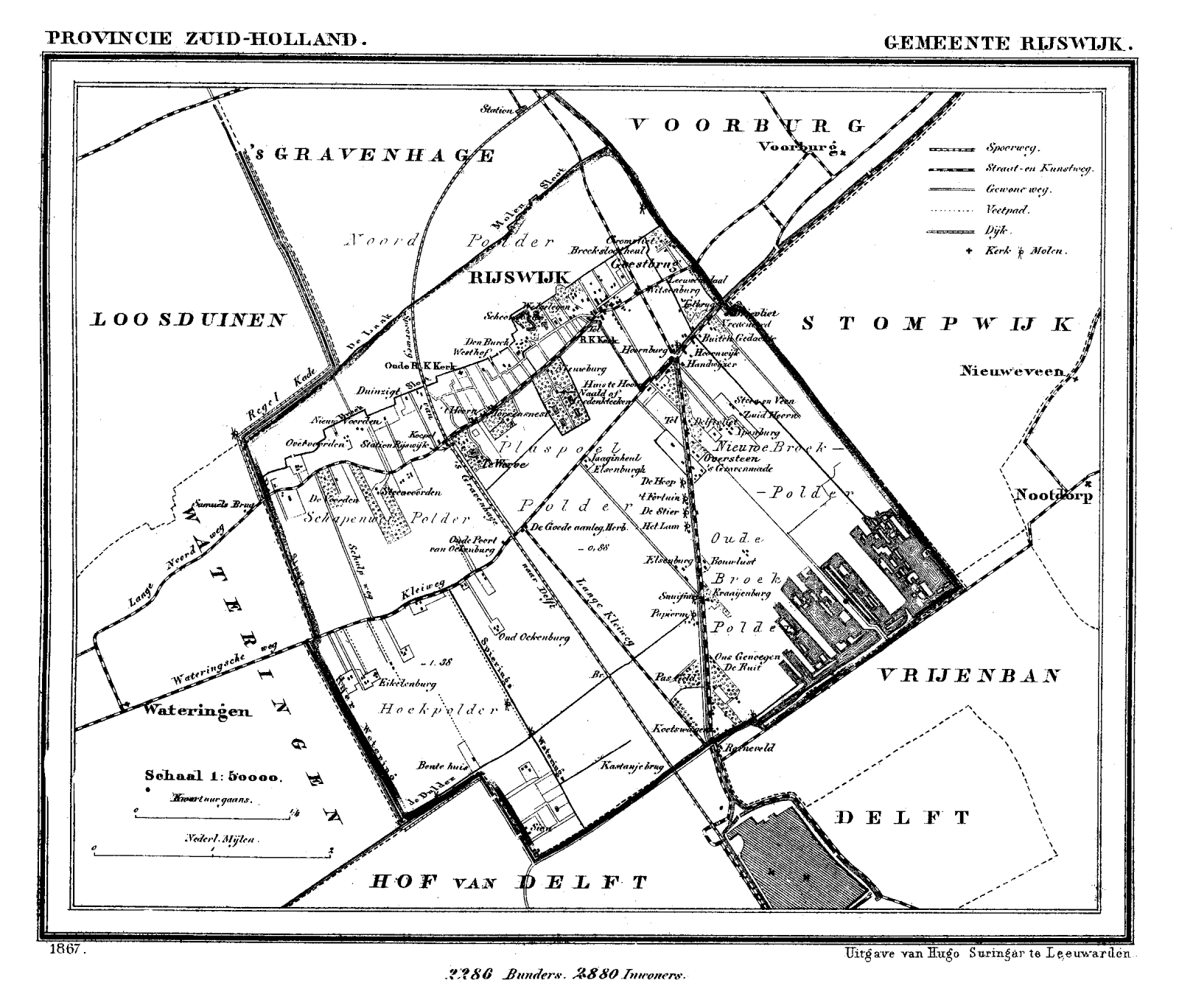
Rijswijk in 1867.

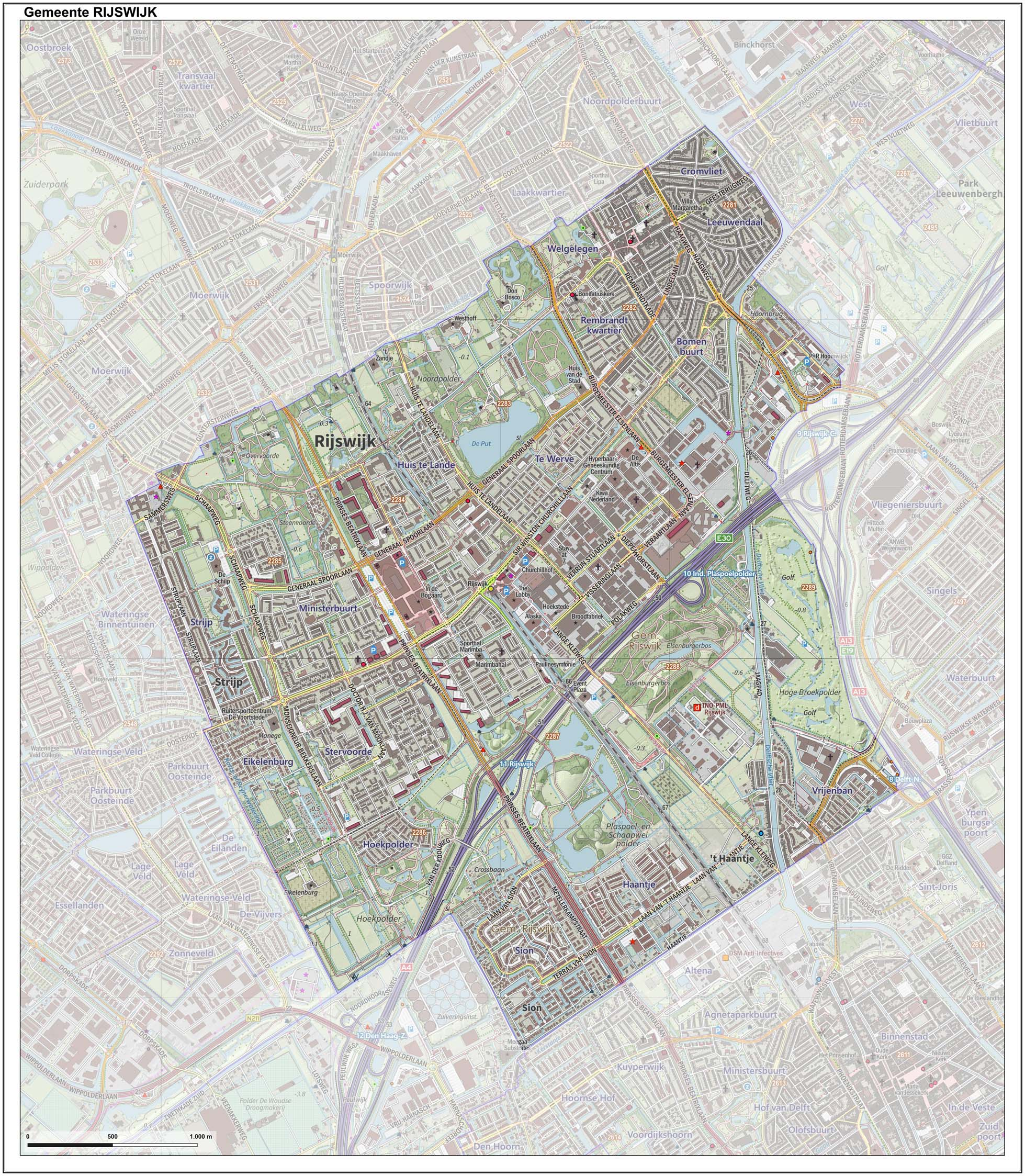
Topographic map of Rijswijk, June 2015

Archaeological excavations indicate that this area of the coastal dunes was already inhabited some 5500 years ago. The village of Rijswijk formed in the 13th century, and its history was dominated by the presence of mansions and estates of the nobility and affluent.

The Treaty of Ryswick was signed at the Huis ter Nieuwburg in 1697, ending the Nine Years' War. A monument, the Needle of Rijswijk (1792), was erected to commemorate the treaty in the Rijswijk Forest.

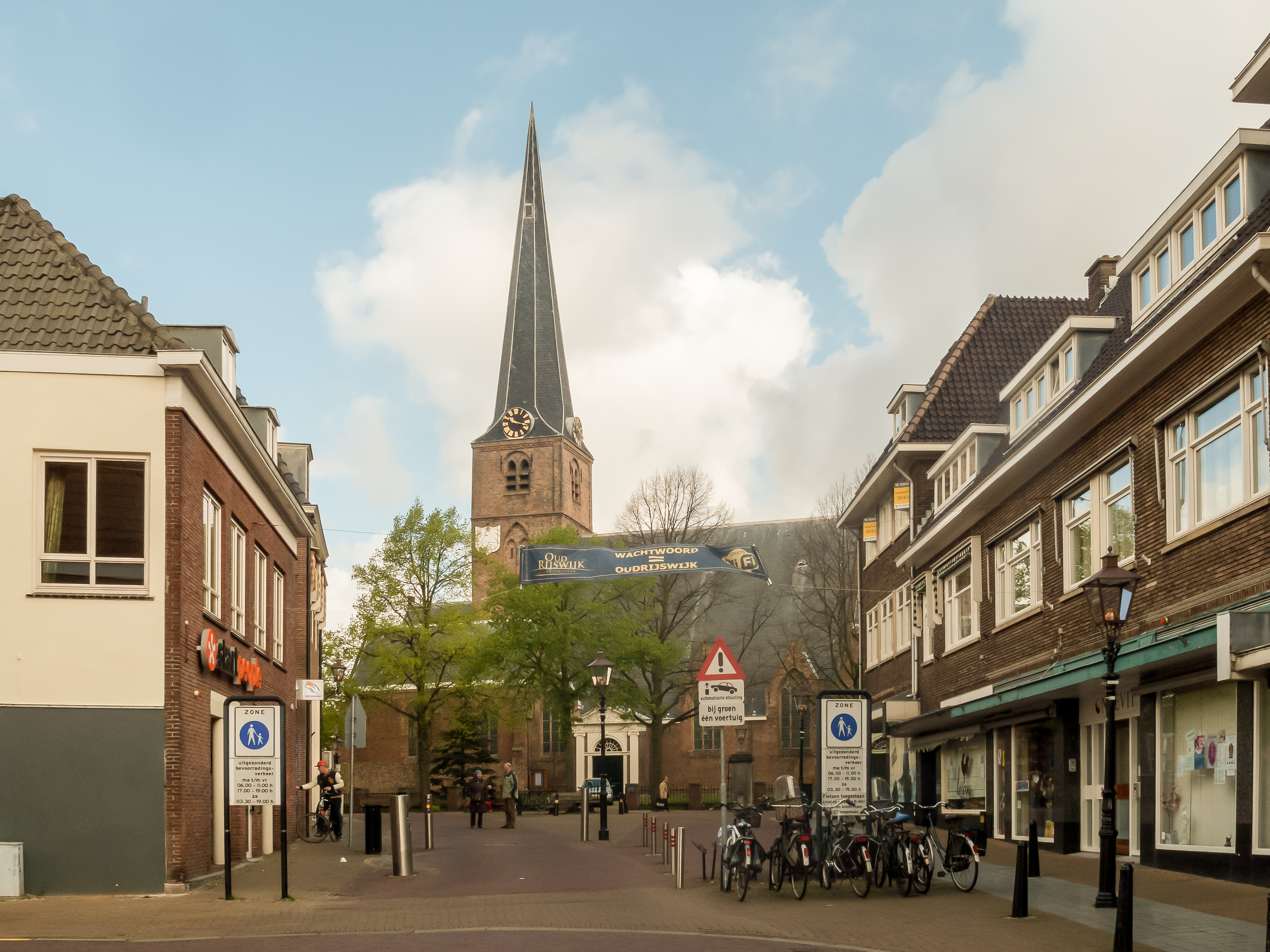
Rijswijk church (de Oude Kerk) in the street

Until 1900, Rijswijk remained a relatively small community but it became urbanised during the 20th century when it expanded rapidly. Today, Rijswijk's area has almost been completely built up. The last major development is the new Ypenburg neighbourhood, built on the lands of the former Ypenburg Airfield, but this part of Rijswijk was annexed by The Hague in 2002. Rijswijk is part of the Haaglanden conurbation. Over the years its built-up area has grown to the point where it has effectively merged with The Hague, and often regarded as its suburb, even though it is still a separate municipality.

Up until 2009, Rijswijk had a polytechnic college for applied sciences; TH Rijswijk (Technische Hogeschool Rijswijk). After a merger with the Haagse Hogeschool, this was moved to the campus of the TUDelft in Delft. The building still remains.

Istana Negara, one of the six presidential palaces of Indonesia, in the Jakarta neighbourhood of Harmoni (formerly Rijswijk-Molenvliet), was called Paleis te Rijswijk during Dutch colonial times.

== Public transport ==
- Rijswijk station
- Stopplaats Rijswijk-Wateringen

== Economy ==
Rijswijk is home to:

- The Biomedical Primate Research Centre (BPRC).
- The Netherlands Patent Office, at the same location as a branch of the European Patent Office.
- A small part of the Dutch national Forensic Laboratory, researching clues and objects in order to aid police investigations. The main building has moved to The Hague-Ypenburg.
- The Headquarters of TUI Netherlands.
- The CBR (Centraal Bureau Rijvaardigheidsbewijzen) a Dutch driving school.

In the past, Rijswijk also used to host the main research and technology centre of the oil and gas company Shell, with approximately 2000 employees. The company decided to close the centre and relocate the activities to Amsterdam and The Hague in 2017.

== Recreation ==
- Parks: Hoekpolder, Plaspoelpolder, Schaapweipolder, Hoge Broekpolder, Noordpolder, Park Overvoorde, Wilhelminapark, Elsenburgerbos, Park Steenvoorde.
- Natural swimming location De Put.
- Rijswijkse Schouwburg, which hosts national theatre shows.
- Von Fisenne Park, which has a petting zoo.
- Sports park 'De Schilp', which has an indoor swimming pool.
- Museum Rijswijk.

The largest shopping centre is called 'In de Bogaard' and smaller shops are located in the old town centre (Herenstraat). There is the old Schaapweimolen (windmill). De Broodfabriek holds many fairs and events.

== Notable people ==
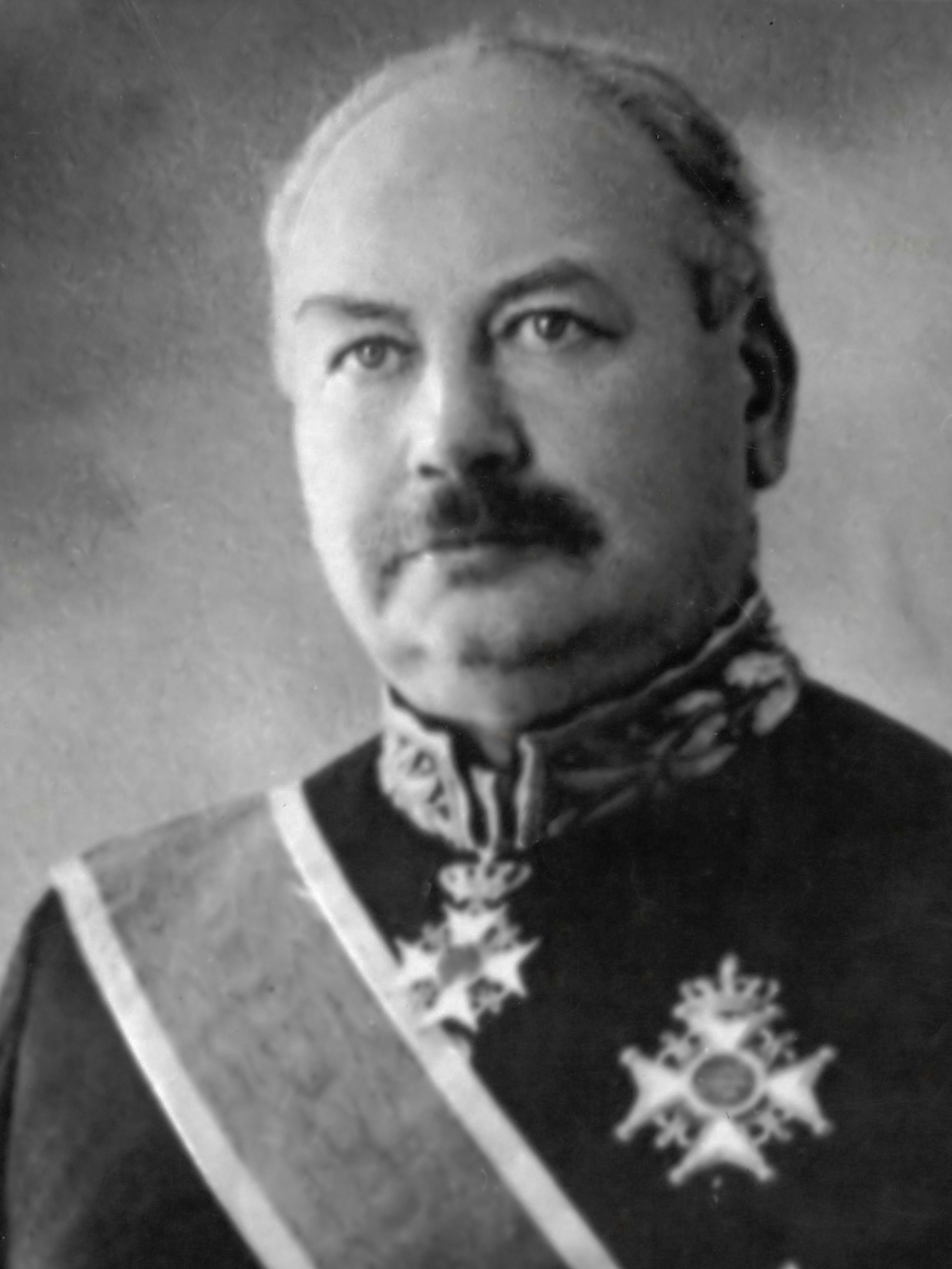
Dionysius Koolen, 1925

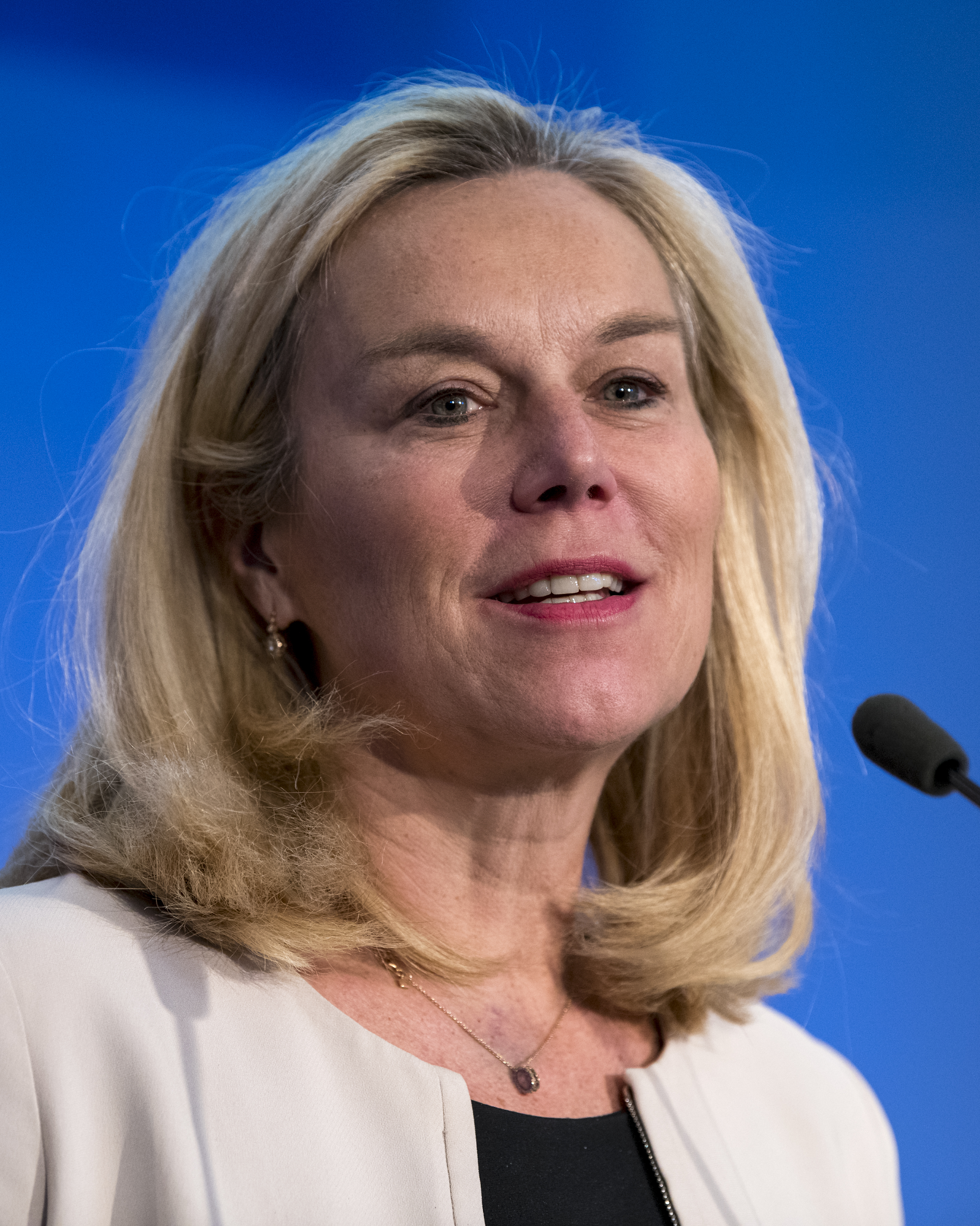
Sigrid Kaag, 2018

=== Public service ===
- Dionysius Koolen (1871–1945) a Dutch politician
- Henk Beernink (1910–1979 in Rijswijk) a Dutch politician
- Chris van Veen (1922–2009) a politician; also worked for the municipality of Rijswijk 1945/1960
- Gerard Veringa (1924–1999 in Rijswijk) a Dutch politician and criminologist
- Maurits Kiek (1909–1980) resistance fighter during World War II
- Peter Oskam (born 1960) a Dutch politician, former football referee, and judge
- Sigrid Kaag (born 1961) a Dutch politician and diplomat, Minister for Foreign Trade and Development since 2017

=== Arts and learning ===
- Adriaen van der Cabel (1630–1705) a Dutch Golden Age landscape painter
- Hendrik Tollens (1780–1856 in Rijswijk) poet
- P. J. Cosijn (1840–1899) a Dutch scholar of Anglo-Saxon literature
- Jacques van Meegeren (1912–1977) a Dutch illustrator, painter and suspected art forger
- Teddy Scholten (1926–2010) a Dutch singer and winner of the 1959 Eurovision Song Contest
- Felix Thijssen (1933–2022) author of crime and science fiction novels and books for children
- Johan van Benthem (born 1949) former academic logician
- Albert Benschop (1949–2018) a Dutch sociologist and academic
- Peter Slaghuis (1961–1991) a Dutch musician, DJ, producer and remixer
- Eelco Visser (1966–2022), professor of computer science
- Ilja Leonard Pfeijffer (born 1968) a poet, novelist, polemicist, and classical scholar

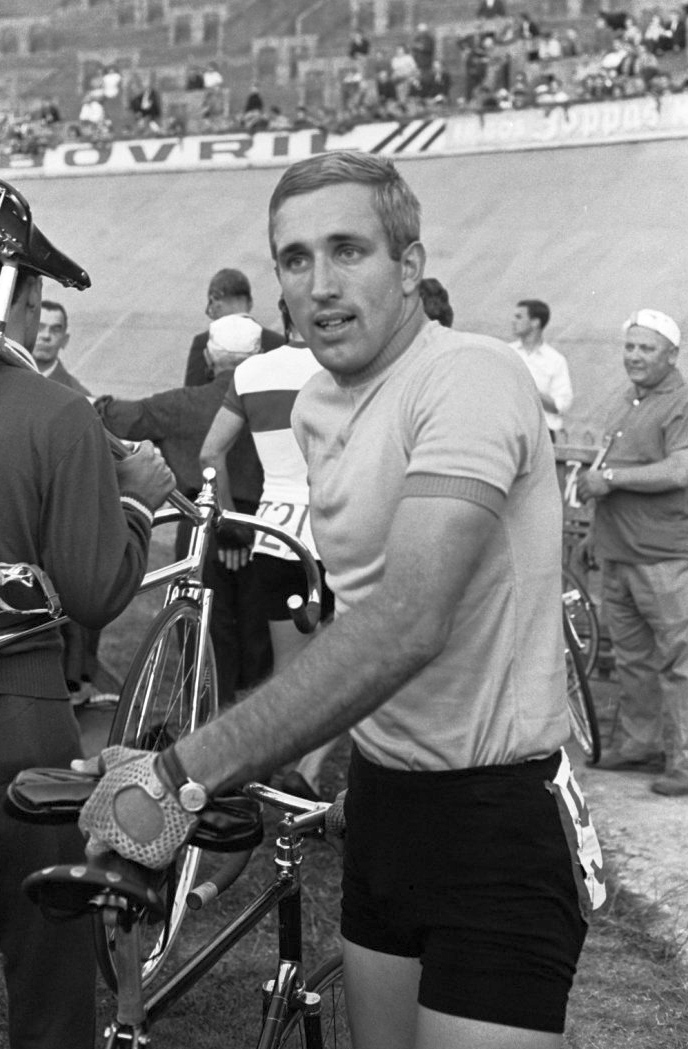
Piet van der Touw, 1963

=== Sport ===
- Louis Otten (1883–1946) football player, team bronze medallist at the 1908 Summer Olympics
- Piet van der Touw (born 1940) a retired cyclist; competed at the 1960 and 1964 Summer Olympics
- Richard Knopper (born 1977) a Dutch former footballer with 285 club caps
- Anish Giri (born 1994) a Russian-born Dutch chess Grandmaster, lives in Rijswijk
- Keye van der Vuurst de Vries (born 2001) a Dutch basketball player, made his debut for the Netherlands national basketball team aged 16
- Jeffrey de Zwaan (born 1996) Dutch darts player, born in Rijswijk
- Mark Caljouw (born 1995) Dutch badminton player, born in Rijswijk
