= Albert Benschop =

Dutch sociologist (1949–2018)

Albert Benschop (10 May 1949, Rijswijk - 27 February 2018) was a Dutch sociologist with the University of Amsterdam's faculty of Social and Behavioral Sciences. He initiated and ran a sociology-focused website called SocioSite. This online source - available since August, 2000 - is designed to offer access to relevant information and resources for social scientists.

== Biography ==
Benschop received a master's degree in sociology and psychology at the Vrije Universiteit Amsterdam early 1970s. In 1972 he was named leader of the SRVU Students' union of the Vrije Universiteit Amsterdam, which occupied the main building of the Vrije Universiteit during the student protests that year.

In 1973 Benschop had been a lecturer and researcher at the department of Sociology at the Universiteit van Amsterdam. In the late 1990s he founded the SocioSite website, which was a popular social-science website in the early 2000s.

== Publication list (partial) ==
English

- Classes - Outline of a Transformational Class Analysis , Summary, 1993
- The future of the semantic web , Making content understandable for computers, April 2004
- Peer-to-peer: Networks of unknown friends , The power of sharing, March 2004
- Chronicle of a Political Murder Foretold, Jihad in the Netherlands, November 2005

Dutch

- Max Weber’s bijdrage aan de theorie van sociale ongelijkheid en klassen, 1987–2011
