= Needle of Rijswijk =

Obelisk commemorating the Treaty of Ryswick

Coordinates: 52°2′56″N 4°19′40″E

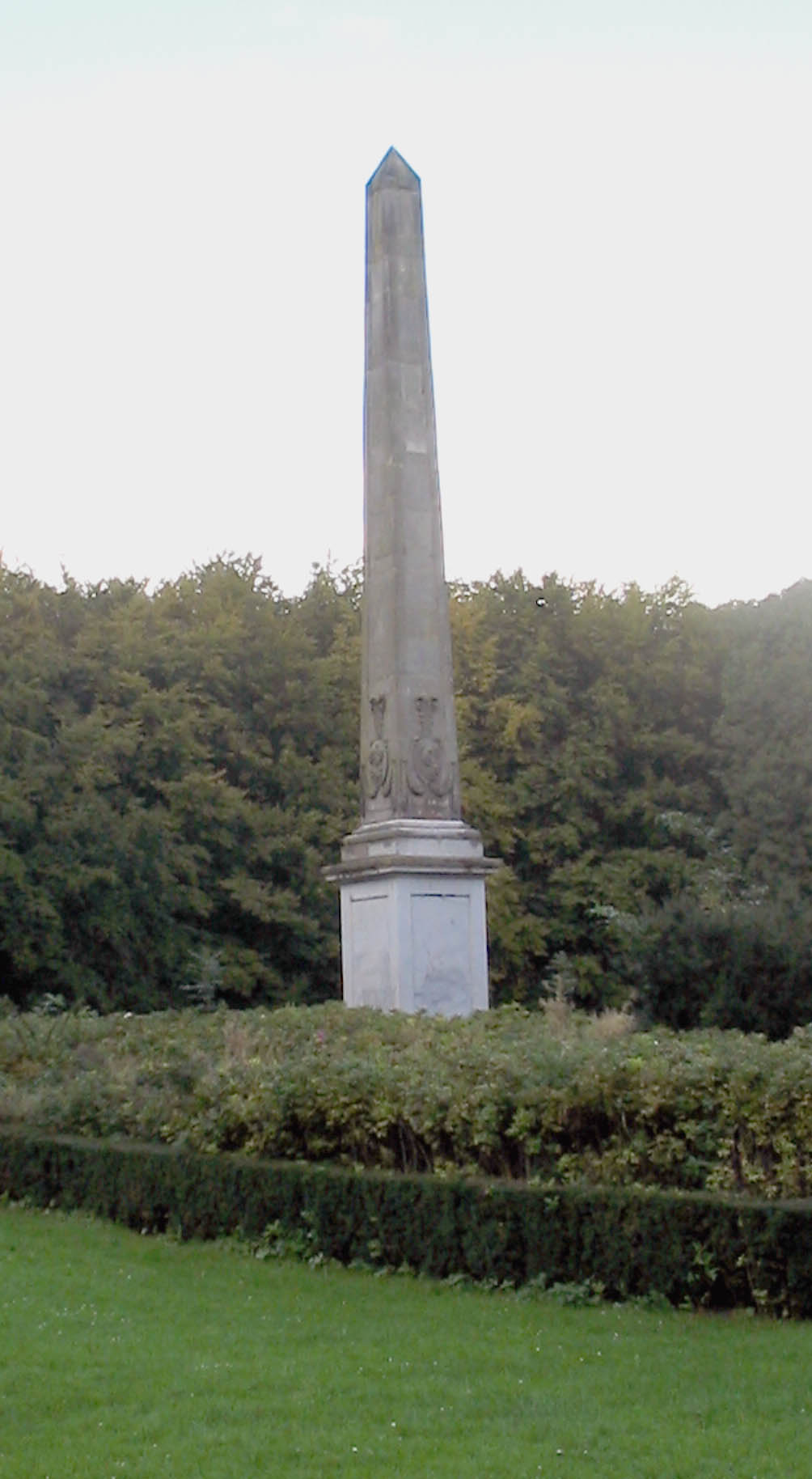
The obelisk in Rijswijk Woods (Rijswijkse Bos)

The Needle of Ryswick or Rijswijk (Dutch: Naald van Rijswijk) is an obelisk in Rijswijk, the Netherlands, commemorating the Treaty of Ryswick (September 1697).

The monument is at the location of the Huis ter Nieuwburg, the palace where the peace treaty was signed. It was built of materials from Huis ter Nieuwburg in 1792 to 1794. The palace was demolished in 1790 due to neglect.
