= Louis de Verjus =

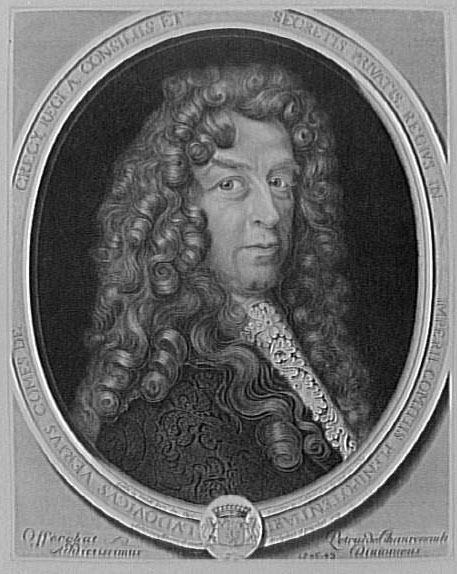
Crécy-Verjus, ambassador – engraving by Antoine Masson (1636–1700) after a portrait of c. 1695, when Verjus was plenipotentiary to the German lands.

Louis (de) Verjus, count of Crécy (1629, Paris – 13 December 1709) was a French politician and diplomat.

== Biography ==
A Conseiller d’État and brother of the notable Jesuit and procurer for missions to the Levant Antoine Verjus (22 January 1632 – 16 May 1706), he was elected to the Académie française in 1679. He served as Louis XIV's second plenipotentiary to the Congress of Ryswick and before the Eternal Diet of Regensburg in 1695. Thanks to his wide knowledge of the Germanic courts, he was also one of the signatories to the final treaty at Regensburg, dated 30 October 1697. Hyacinthe Rigaud, with help from Adrien Prieur (who was paid 42 livres for his help), produced an image of Verjus in 1700. He was paid 450 livres for it, which suggests quite a large work, for his account books mention this portrait as "Habillement répété" ("Repeated clothing", i.e. copied from a previous model).

According to Saint-Simon, "[Crécy Verjus] was a wise and measured man, who—beneath a disagreeable exterior and manners and knowing the foreigner well, in the new debacle that the French were forced to stay in, and a language the same,—hid an uncommon address and finesse, prompt understanding, by discernment of those with whom he had to treat and of their aim; and who by dint of only hearing what he wanted to hear, by patience and indefatigable effort, and by fertilirt in presenting under all kinds of different appearances the same things that had been rebutted, often arrived at his aim".

On Verjus's death, the duke-writer added: "He was a short little man, soft, polite, respectful, clever, who passed his life on foreign services, and who took all manners, up to the very long language at Regensburg, then in many minor courts of Germany [...] He had much insinuation, the art of re-saying the same thing a hundred times, always in different ways, [and] very often thus succeeded. Nobody knew more on the usages, laws and rights of the Empire and Germany, and [knew] history as well; he was esteemed and well-thought-of abroad, and served there very well. He was very old, and a very short man".

His son, Louis-Alexandre Verjus, marquis de Crécy (1676–1763), was colonel of the Régiment de Boulonnois (1703), brigadier d'armée (1710), gouvernor of Toul, and rose to maréchal-de-camp in 1719.
