= Grand Alliance (League of Augsburg) =

Anti-French European coalition (1689–1713)

Treaty of the Grand Alliance
Grand Alliance between England, the Dutch Republic and the Habsburg Monarchy
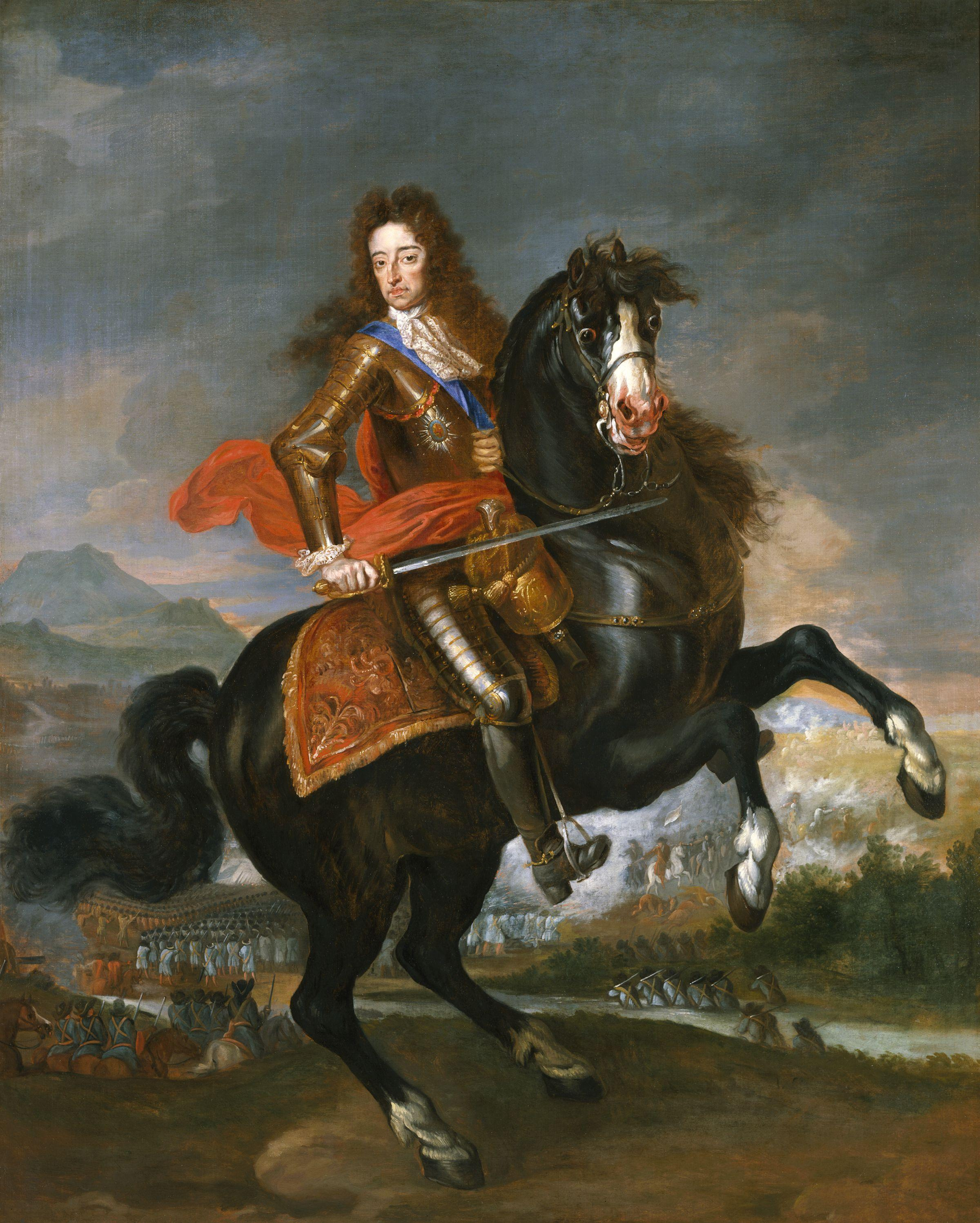
- The architect of the Alliance, William III, Stadtholder of the Dutch Republic and King of England, Scotland and Ireland
- Context: Anti-French coalition
- Signed: 20 December 1689
- Location: The Hague
- Parties: Habsburg monarchy; Dutch Republic; England; Spain (from 1690); Savoy (1690–1696) (Note: Savoy made a separate peace with France in 1696.); Portugal (from 1703)

The Grand Alliance (Note: German: Große Allianz, Dutch: Grote Alliantie, Spanish: Gran Alianza, Italian: Grande Alleanza, also known as the League of Augsburg, German: Augsburger Allianz, Dutch: Liga van Augsburg) was signed on 20 December 1689 by William III, King of England and Scotland, and Leopold I, Holy Roman Emperor. A coalition between the Dutch Republic, England, and the Habsburg Monarchy, its primary purpose was to oppose the expansionist policies of Louis XIV of France.

With the subsequent additions of Spain and Savoy, the Grand Alliance fought the 1688 to 1697 Nine Years' War against France that ended with the Peace of Ryswick. It was reformed by the 1701 Treaty of The Hague prior to the War of the Spanish Succession, and dissolved in 1713 following the Peace of Utrecht.

== Background ==
The Grand Alliance was the most significant of the coalitions formed in response to the wars of Louis XIV that began in 1667 and ended in 1714. The 1648 Peace of Westphalia provided more autonomy to states within the Holy Roman Empire, weakening the collective security previously provided by the Imperial Circles. The result was a series of individual agreements, such as the 1679 Wetterau Union. (Note: The list of members illustrates the fragmented nature of the Empire; the ten original members were the Counts of Stollberg, Westerburg, most branches of the House of Nassau, plus Hanau, Solms, Isenburg, Wied, Wittgenstein, Waldeck, and Manderscheid. Later additions included Hessen-Kassel, Cologne, Fulda, Hessen-Darmstadt, Schwarzburg, Gotha, Eisenach and Würzburg.)

In 1672, Louis XIV launched the Franco-Dutch War, which briefly threatened to overrun the Dutch Republic, before the conflict ended with the 1678 to 1679 Treaties of Nijmegen. The high point of French influence in this period, his opponents were dismayed when Louis XIV continued his aggressive diplomatic and military policies. The 1683–1684 War of the Reunions extended French control of Alsace and during the 1683–1699 Great Turkish War, France secretly supported the Ottomans against the Austrian Habsburgs. At the same time, payments by Louis XIV to states, including Bavaria, the Palatinate, Cologne and Brandenburg-Prussia, threatened Habsburg influence within the Holy Roman Empire.

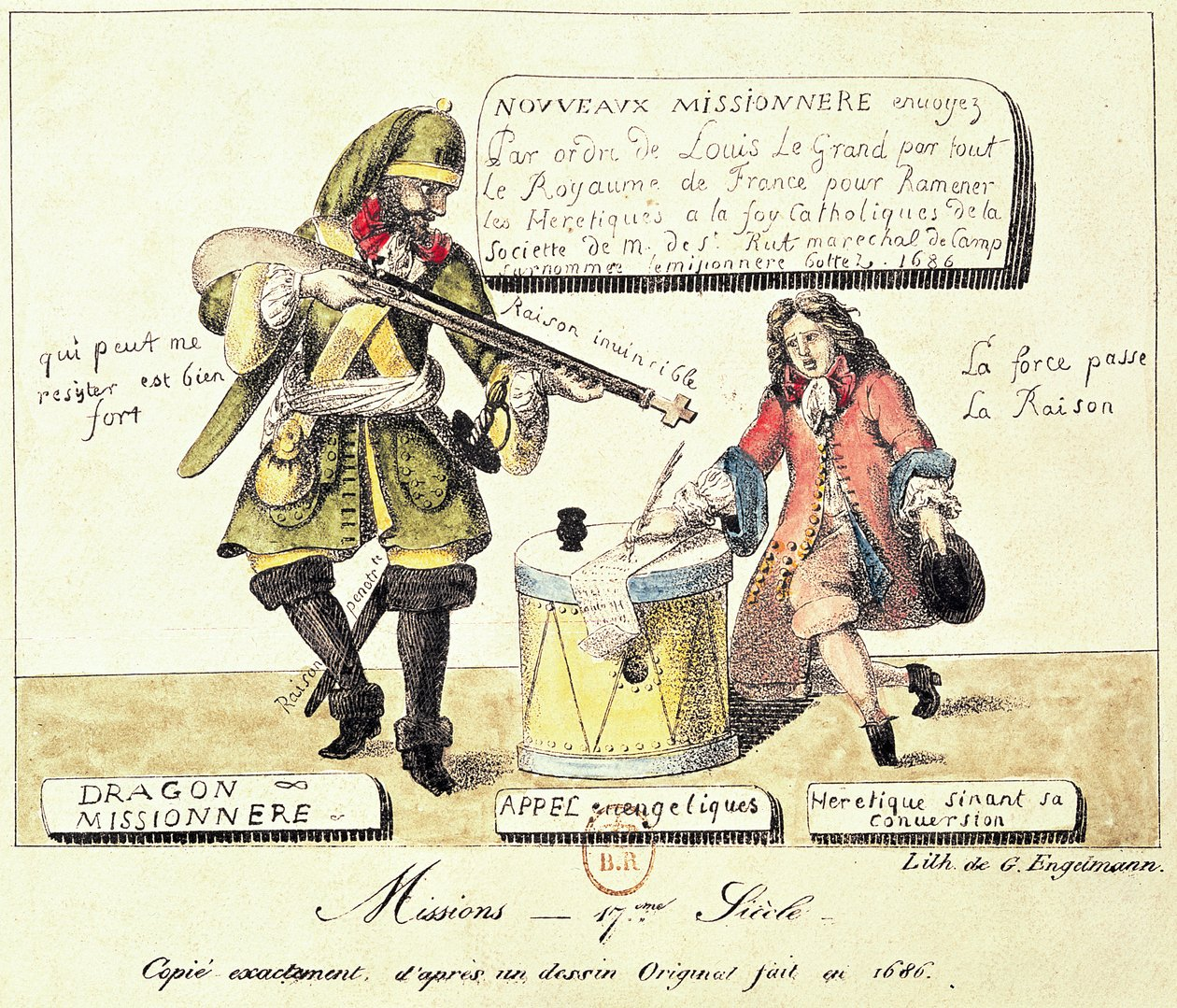
The persecution of French Huguenots and his expansionist policies meant Protestant states like the Dutch Republic saw Louis XIV as a threat

This sense of threat increased when Protestant Denmark–Norway also received financial backing, while in February 1685, the accession of the Catholic James II as King of England potentially provided Louis with another ally. This was followed by the October 1685 Edict of Fontainebleau, which revoked tolerance for French Huguenots, an estimated 200,000 to 400,000 of whom left France over the next five years.

Concern at these policies led Frederick William, Elector of Brandenburg, to invite French exiles to settle in his territories, while he also agreed a treaty with the Dutch Republic in October 1685. The 1686 massacre of around 2,000 Vaudois Protestants reinforced Protestant fears that Europe was threatened with another Counter-Reformation, this time led by Louis XIV.

== Formation ==
With Leopold occupied by the Ottomans, in 1679 William of Orange took the lead in forming an anti-French alliance. Known as the Union of Wetterau, this coalition of Imperial German states was ostensibly set up to "preserve the peace and liberties of Europe". Since the Dutch Republic was outside the Empire, it could not formally be a member of the Union, but many of its leaders were senior Dutch officers, including the head, Prince Georg Friedrich of Waldeck. The most significant innovation was that its members funded a central 'Union' army, rather than providing individual contingents, a change that greatly enhanced its effectiveness.

The Imperial Circles ca 1560; these grouped states within the Empire for mutual defence and support. The Burgundian Circle shown here includes the Dutch Republic, which became independent in 1648.

The same model was used for the 1682 Laxenburg Alliance, which grouped Austria with the Upper Rhenish and Franconian Circles to defend the Rhineland, but the War of Reunions proved it could not oppose France on its own. When Philip William inherited the Palatinate in May 1685, Louis claimed half of it, based on the marriage of Elizabeth Charlotte of the Palatinate to Philippe of Orléans, creating another crisis.

Victory over the Ottomans at the Battle of Vienna in 1683 allowed Leopold to refocus on the western portions of the Empire. The League of Augsburg was formed in July 1686 by combining the Laxenburg Alliance with the Burgundian Circle, Swedish Pomerania, and Bavaria.

On 27 September 1688, French forces invaded the Rhineland and attacked Philippsburg, launching the Nine Years' War. The anti-French coalition was strengthened when the Glorious Revolution deposed James II in November 1688, and William of Orange became William III/II of England and Scotland. The Dutch Republic declared war on France in March 1689, followed by England in May.

== Membership; League of Augsburg v Grand Alliance ==
The overlap between the various coalitions is often confusing. The Empire contained hundreds of members, each belonging to an Imperial Circle (see map), an administrative unit for collecting taxes and mutual support; the Swabian Circle alone had over 88 members. Individual states could form or join alliances, such as the 1685 agreement between Brandenburg-Prussia and the Dutch Republic, while Leopold signed the Grand Alliance as Archduke of Austria. However, only the Imperial Diet could commit the entire Empire; unlike the 1701–1714 War of the Spanish Succession, the Nine Years' War was not declared an 'Imperial' one.

A number of foreign monarchs became personally involved, because they held titles and lands within the Empire. Sweden was technically neutral, but Charles XI of Sweden was also Duke of Swedish Pomerania, a member of the Lower Saxon Circle and part of the League. The same applied to the Spanish Netherlands, a member of the Burgundian Circle, but not the Kingdom of Spain, which joined the Grand Alliance in 1690.

Lastly, some writers fail to differentiate between the Grand Alliance, i.e. England, the Dutch Republic, Spain and Austria, and the wider anti-French 'alliance,' which included German states like Bavaria, the Palatinate, etc. European diplomacy was extremely hierarchical; the Grand Alliance acknowledged the Dutch Republic and England as Leopold's equals, a status he guarded with great care. This made the later admission of Savoy a major triumph for Victor Amadeus, but Leopold refused to allow Bavaria and Brandenburg-Prussia separate representation at the Ryswick peace talks in 1697.

== Provisions ==
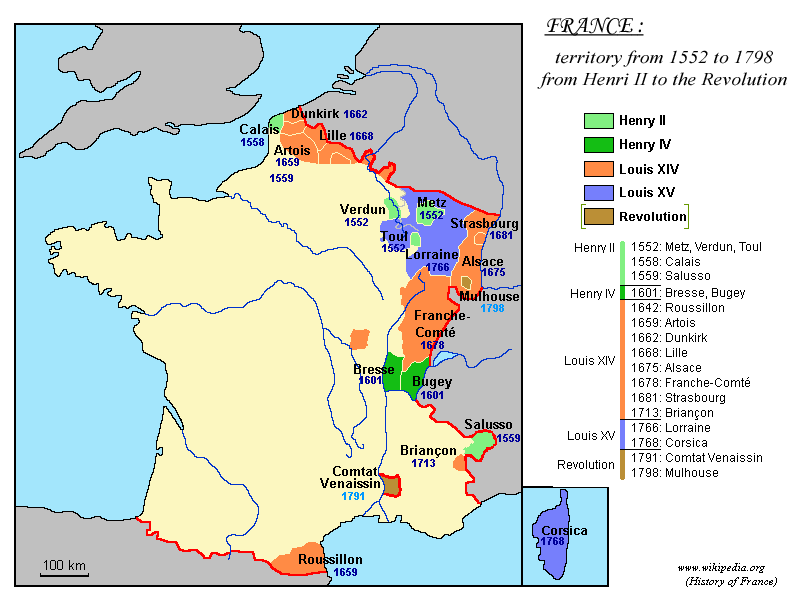
The Grand Alliance sought to halt French expansion under Louis XIV (marked in orange)

The terms of the alliance were largely based on the agreements of May 1689 between the Dutch Republic and Austria, and the August 1689 Anglo-Dutch "Treaty of Friendship and Alliance". It was finally signed on 20 December 1689, delayed by Leopold's concerns on accepting William as King of England, and the impact on English Roman Catholics.

The main provisions were to ensure restoration of the borders agreed at Westphalia in 1648, the independence of the Duchy of Lorraine and French recognition of the Protestant succession in England. Signatories also bound themselves not to agree a separate peace; failure to keep this commitment had greatly improved the French position during negotiations over the 1678 to 1679 Treaties of Nijmegen.

What would happen when the childless Charles II of Spain died featured in many agreements of the period, including the 1670 Treaty of Dover between England and France. A secret clause now committed England and the Dutch Republic to support Leopold's claims to the Spanish throne, an undertaking that would lead to another war.

== Aftermath ==
The main area of conflict was in the Spanish Netherlands, with the Dutch doing much of the fighting; Habsburg forces were occupied by a renewed Ottoman offensive in Southeastern Europe, while the War in Ireland absorbed resources in England and Scotland until 1692. The entry of Spain and Savoy opened new fronts in Catalonia and Northern Italy but both required support by Allied-funded German auxiliaries.

The purpose of the Grand Alliance was to resist French expansion, the legality of Louis' claims in the Palatinate being less important than their impact on the balance of power. Its creation also highlighted the obsolescence of the Imperial Circles and ultimately led to the rise of larger, more centralised states, chiefly Brandenburg-Prussia, Bavaria and Saxony. As a result, it can be seen as a significant milestone in the concept of collective security, the fundamental issue at stake in the War of the Spanish Succession.

The Nine Years' War was financially crippling for participants; the average army size increased from 25,000 in 1648 to over 100,000 by 1697, a level unsustainable for pre-industrial economies. Between 1689 and 1696, 80% of English government revenues were spent on the military, with one in seven adult males serving in the army or navy; figures were similar or worse for other combatants.

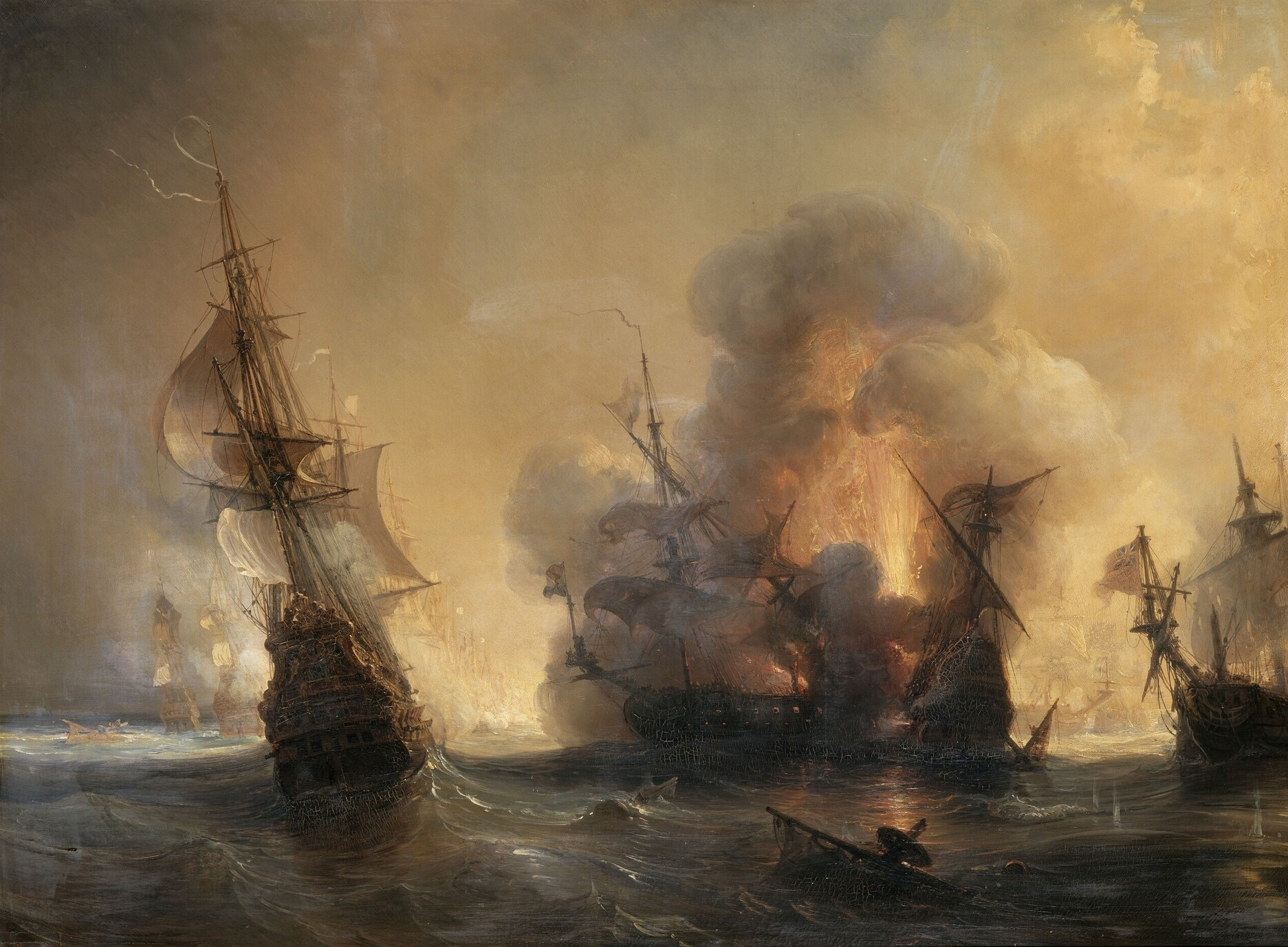
The Battle of Lagos (1693) by Théodore Gudin; the loss of Dutch and English merchant ships caused huge financial losses, and increased opposition to the war

By 1693, both sides recognised a military solution was no longer possible, and France began informal peace talks with Dutch and Savoyard representatives. Louis XIV agreed a separate peace with Savoy in the August 1696 Treaty of Turin, but wider talks made little progress. Leopold demanded the restoration of all Imperial losses in the Rhineland since 1667, and an agreement on the Spanish succession. Until these issues were addressed, he held his allies to their commitment not to make a separate peace.

The Peace of Ryswick was agreed only after France agreed to return Luxembourg to Spain, and Louis set aside his personal commitment to James by recognising William as King of England and Scotland. Despite this, Leopold only signed with great reluctance in October 1697. His hesitation was arguably correct in that leaving the Spanish succession unresolved resulted in a new round of fighting in 1701. However, at the time, the English in particular felt his demands simply prolonged a hugely expensive war for little benefit. Studies show English trade with Southern Europe alone declined by over 25% between 1689 and 1693, while the French capture of over 90 merchant ships at Lagos in 1693 caused massive losses for merchants in both London and Amsterdam.

These losses strengthened opposition among English Tories to spending money on European wars, rather than the Royal Navy. This had a long-lasting impact on English attitudes; in 1744, James Ralph began his chapter on the Nine Years' War as follows; 'The moment he (William) became sovereign, he made the Kingdom subservient to the Republic; in war, we had the honour to fight for the Dutch; in negotiation, to treat for the Dutch; while the Dutch had all possible encouragement to trade for us...'.

== Sources ==
- Aubrey, TP (1979). The Defeat of James Stuart's Armada 1692. Leicester University Press. ISBN 978-0718511685.;
- Bosher, JF (February 1994). "The Franco-Catholic Danger, 1660–1715". History. 79 (255): 5–30. doi:10.1111/j.1468-229X.1994.tb01587.x. JSTOR 24421929.;
- Childs, John (1991). The Nine Years' War and the British Army, 1688-1697: The Operations in the Low Countries. Manchester University Press. ISBN 978-0719089961.;
- "The City of London's strange history". Financial Times. 29 September 2014.
- Hochedlinger, Michael (2003). Austria's Wars of Emergence, 1683-1797. Routledge. ISBN 978-0582290846.;
- Lesaffer, Randall (10 November 2014). "The peace of Utrecht and the balance of power". OUP Blog.
- Maass, Mathias (2017). Small States in World Politics: The Story of Small State Survival, 1648-2016. Manchester University Press. ISBN 978-0719082733.;
- Meerwijk, MB (2011). Negotiating the Grand Alliance; the role of the King-Stadtholder's corps diplomatique in establishing a new alliance between 'Austria', the Dutch Republic and England, 1688 - 1690 (PhD). Utrecht University.
- Nolan, Cathal (2017). The Allure of Battle: A History of How Wars Have Been Won and Lost. OUP. ISBN 978-0195383782.;
- Ralph, James (1744). The History of England. Coogan & Waller.;
- Rommelse, Gijs; Onnekink, David, eds. (2016). Ideology and Foreign Policy in Early Modern Europe (1650–1750). Routledge. ISBN 978-1138278820.;
- Spielvogel, Jackson J (1980). Western Civilization. Wadsworth Publishing. ISBN 978-1285436401.;
- Stapleton, John M (2003). Forging a Coalition Army; William III, the Grand Alliance and the Confederate Army in the Spanish Netherlands 1688-97 (PhD). Ohio State University.
- Szechi, Daniel (1994). The Jacobites: Britain and Europe, 1688–1788. Manchester University Press. ISBN 978-0719037740.;
- Troost, Wouter (2005). William III the Stadholder-king: A Political Biography. Routledge. ISBN 978-0754650713.;
- Wolf, John (1968). Louis XIV (1974 ed.). WW Norton & Co. ISBN 978-0393007534.;
- Young, William (2004). International Politics and Warfare in the Age of Louis XIV and Peter the Great. iUniverse. ISBN 978-0595329922.
