= Château de Meudon =

Historic palace in Meudon, France

Coordinates: 48°48′18″N 2°13′52″E

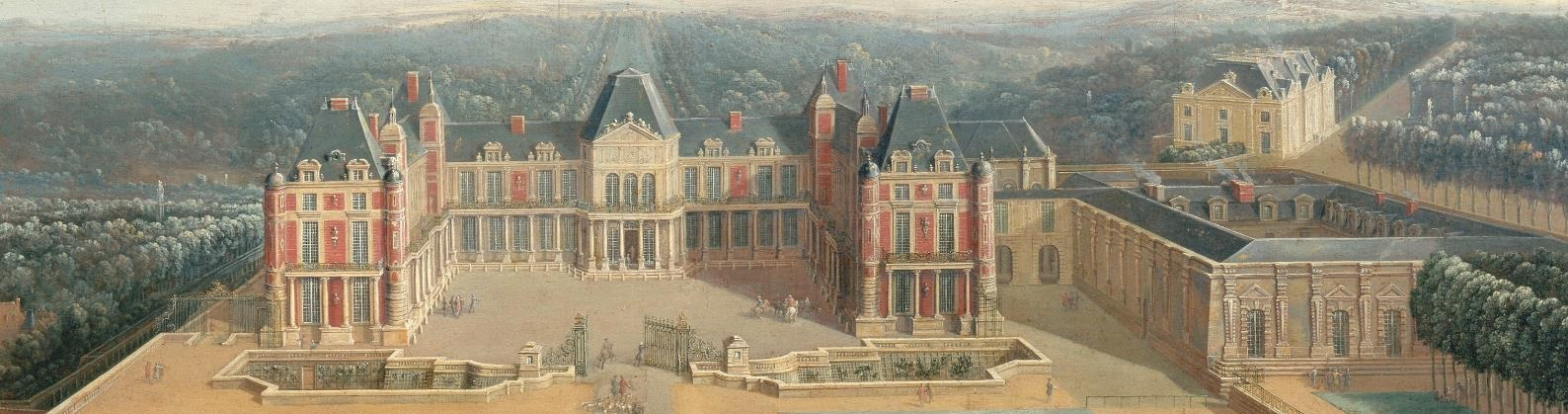
- The Château-Vieux in 1723, by Pierre-Denis Martin. Musée de Versailles.
- Interactive map of Château de Meudon
- Location: Meudon
- Nearest city: Paris, Versailles

History
- Founded: 14th century

Monument historique
- Designated: 12 April 1972

Château de Meudon (French pronunciation: [ʃato də mødɔ̃]), also known as the Royal Castle of Meudon or Imperial Palace of Meudon, is a French castle in Meudon, Hauts-de-Seine. At the edge of a wooded plateau, the castle offers views of Paris and the Seine, as well as of the Chalais valley. Located between Paris and Versailles, in the heart of a hunting reserve, the castle has an ideal topography for large gardens.

"... the most beautiful place in the world, both in its layout and in its location. " - J. F. Blondel, Cours d'Architecture ..., 1773, volume 4, p. 132.

It had many successive owners from the Renaissance until the fall of the Second French Empire. It should not be confused with the Château de Bellevue, also located in Meudon.

Famous past residents include: Anne de Pisseleu d'Heilly, Duchess of Étampes; the Cardinal of Lorraine, Abel Servien; François Michel Le Tellier, Marquis of Louvois and Louis, Grand Dauphin, also known as Monseigneur, who linked the Chaville Castle to Meudon Castle. The Château-Vieux (Old Castle) burned down in 1795 and was rebuilt as the Château-Neuf (New Castle), which in turn burned down in 1871. Demolition was considered, but most of the castle was preserved and became an observatory with an astronomical telescope in 1878, which was then attached to the Observatory of Paris in 1927.

The Château de Meudon has been classified as a historical monument since 12 April 1972. Hangar Y in the Chalais-Meudon park has been classified as an historical monument since 4 June 2000. It was the first storage facility for aerostats in the world and is one of the few still standing.

== History ==
=== Late Middle Ages ===
==== Lords of Meudon (12th century–1413) ====
There is little information on the origin of the castle, but it was certainly a small castle with an unknown floor plan. Many records do, however, exist of 12th-century lords whose patronymic was "Meudon" as well as a mention of a "manor of the Meudon vale" in the 14th century. Marie-Thérèse Herlédan published an account of this period in her book Meudon, Avant le Roy (Meudon Before the King). Many Meudons held positions at court, such as Robert de Meudon, the Grand Panetier of France under King Philip the Fair. His title was mentioned in a deed in 1305.

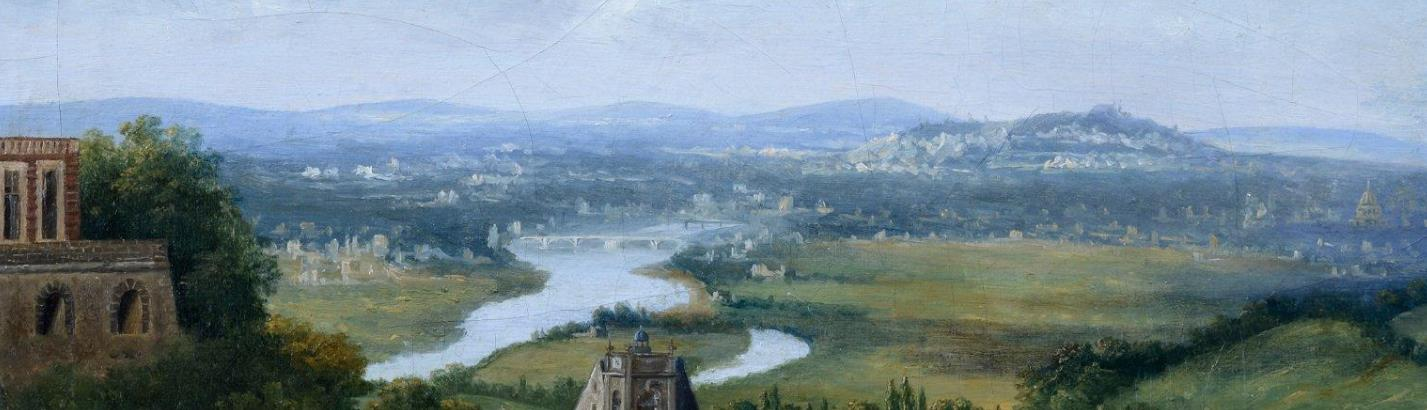
View of Paris from Meudon (detail). Langlacé, 1818. Musée d'art et d'histoire de Meudon.

==== Augustin Isbarre (1413–1425) ====
On 17 July 1413, Jean de Montrevel, known as the Hermit, lord of La Faye, chamberlain of the king and husband of Jeanne de Gaillonnel, holder of the castle's fief, sold the castle with his wife's consent to the wealthy Augustin Isbarre, (Note: Sometimes written "Ysbarre") banker and jeweller. In 1422, Isbarre, whose family had performed financial services for the royal family, was appointed cupbearer to the king. He died in Paris on 27 August 1425 and was buried at the Convent of the Grands Augustins.

=== Renaissance ===
==== Sanguin family and the Duchesse d'Étampes (1426–1552) ====
The fief of Meudon was bought in 1426 by Guillaume Sanguin for 2000 livres. Sanguin was the valet of Charles VII and the treasurer of the Duke of Burgundy. He was previously associated with the former owner, Augustin Isbarre, a provost of the merchants of Paris from 1429 to 1431. It seems that he built a manor on the site of the old castle. He died in Paris on 14 February 1441.

Jean Sanguin, known as the "Bastard of Sanguin", inherited the seigniory of his father; he died in Paris on 13 November 1468. He had several children, including Antoine Sanguin de Meudon, who inherited the fief and became lord of Meudon. Antoine later married Marie Simon and died on 18 October 1500.

The manor was demolished in 1520 by Antoine Sanguin, known as the Cardinal de Meudon, who built a square corps de logis of brick and stone with a loft floor over a ground floor with ornamented skylights. It was adorned in the Italian style with pilasters, bands and stone framing. The layout of the castle supposedly influenced that of the Château du Grand Jardin in Joinville, a property of the House of Guise. Antoine Sanguin gave the castle to his niece Anne of Pisseleu, also called the Duchess of Étampes, on 5 September 1527. She had become the mistress of Francis I, and almost the de facto queen of France. To better accommodate his mistress, Francis financed an addition of two square pavilions on either side of the initial body and two wings that ended with identical pavilions. These extensions mirrored the style of the main building. In the style of the Château d'Écouen, corbelled corner turrets were also added to the pavilions. The structure was similar to the works undertaken at the château at Marchais, then owned by Nicolas de Longueval, Count of Bossut and Superintendent of Finances under Francis I. He was governor of Champagne and Brie and a member of the inner circle of the Duchess of Étampes. The same still-unknown architect likely also headed the expansion of Meudon and Marchais, as well as the neighbouring castle in Sissonne, which are all in the same style. A triumphal arch was also built into the center of the enclosure wall, serving as a majestic entrance to the courtyard.

Francis I stayed at Meudon from 11 July to 5 August 1537 and many more times before his death in 1547.

Rendition of Château de Meudon between the 1520s and 1550s

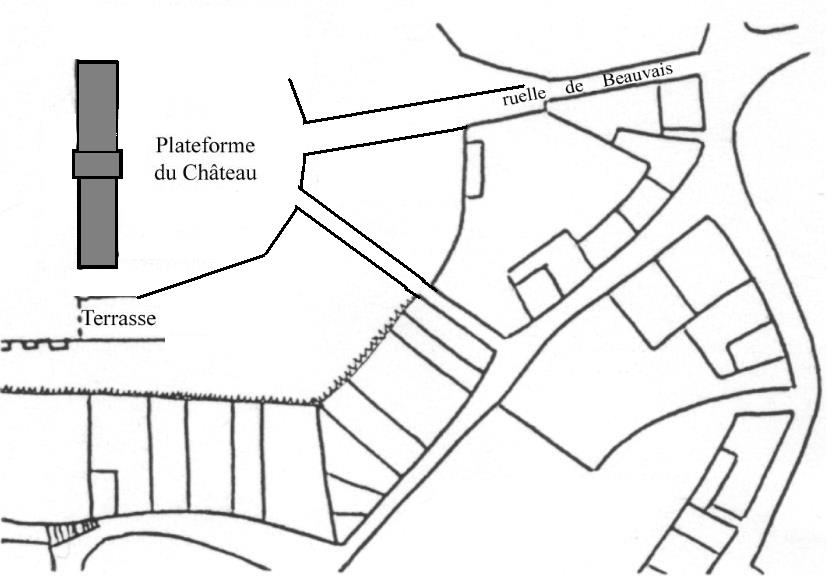
Location of castle of Antoine Sanguin, c. 1520

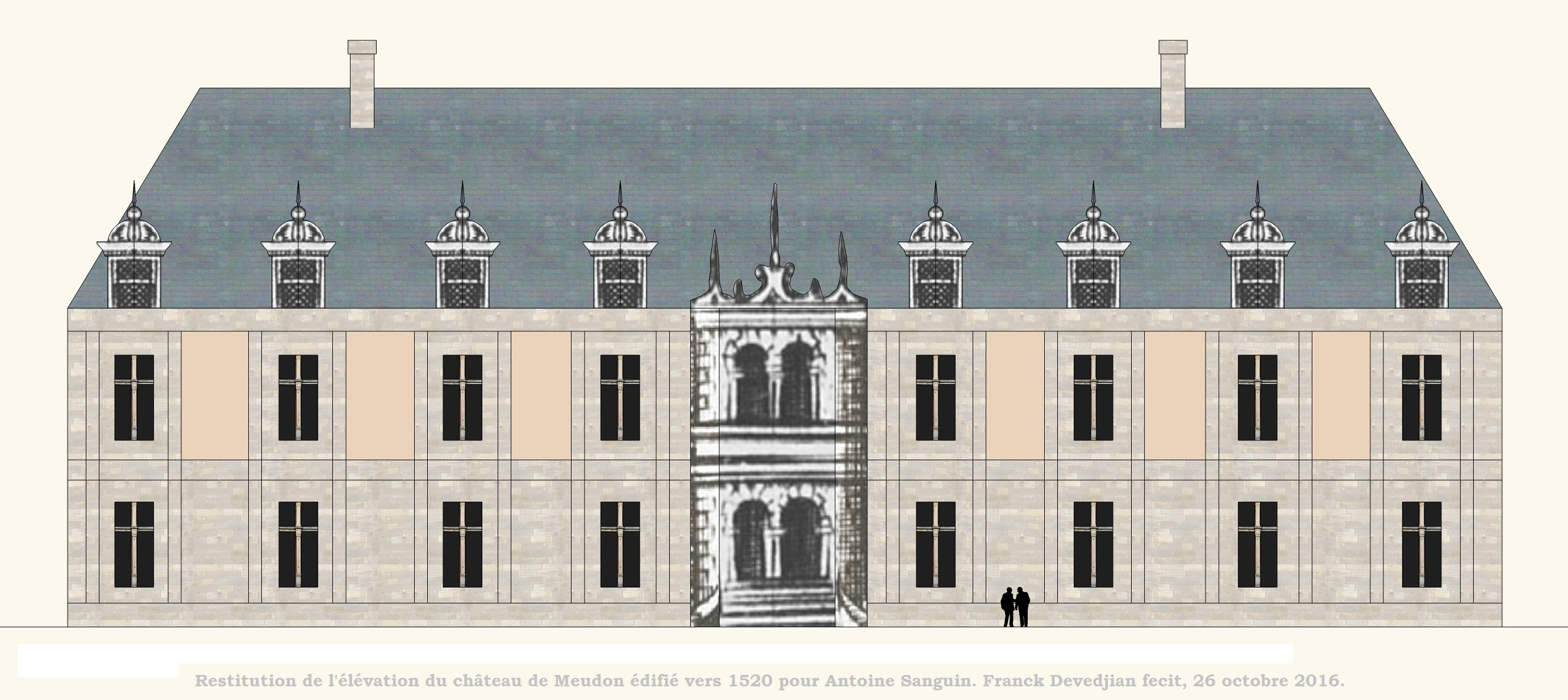
Rendition of castle, c. 1520

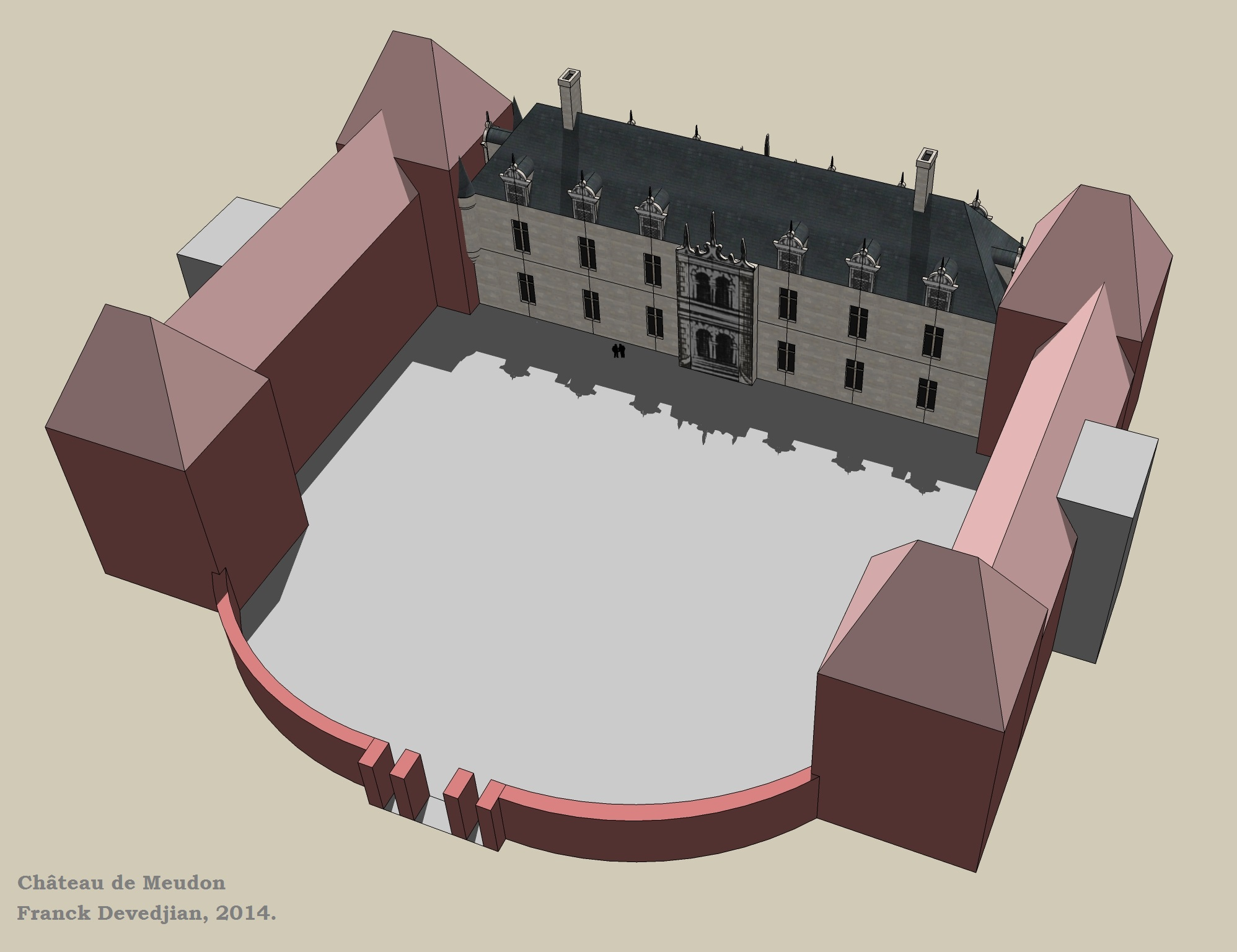
Additions by Anne of Pisseleu, c. 1540

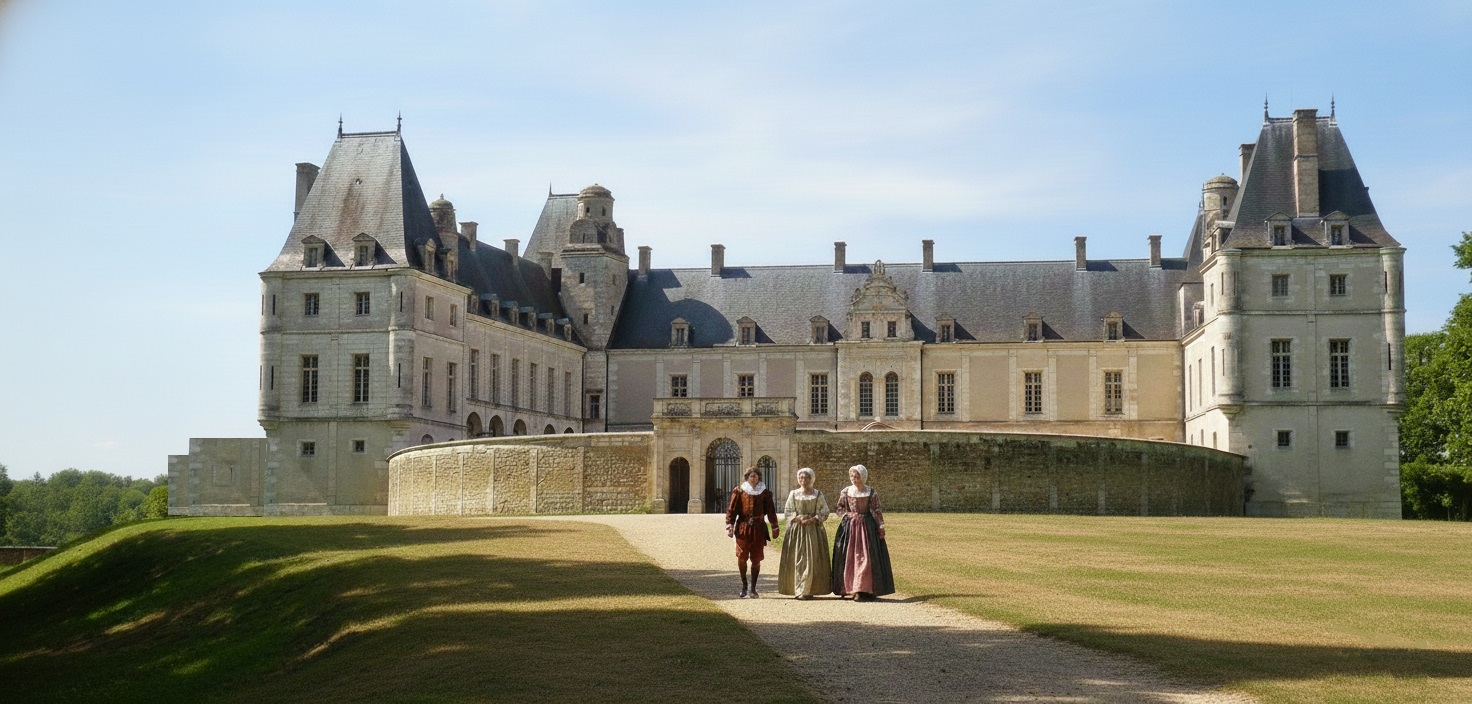
View from mouth of ruelle de Beauvais, c. 1550's

==== Cardinal of Lorraine and the Guises (1552–1654) ====
Upon the death of Francis I, Anne de Pisseleu had to sell the Meudon estate in 1552 to Charles de Guise, Cardinal of Lorraine. This ended the Sanguins' presence at Meudon, which had lasted more than a century. The former favourite withdrew to the Château d'Heilly, where she died in September 1580.

The cardinal then renovated the castle, drawing inspiration from the Italian architectural style, which he had discovered during his travels to Rome. A letter written on 28 December 1552, addressed to his sister-in-law Anna d'Este, says: "I have been at Meudon while I was in Paris... there are no more beautiful houses in this kingdom."

The cardinal had the wings on the courtyard side of the gallery surmounted by a terrace, based on drawings by Francesco Primaticcio. The interiors were decorated with scenes from the Council of Trent, in which the cardinal had actively participated, probably in the style being practised in Italy at that time by Taddeo and Federigo Zuccaro.

Terraced gardens and an orangerie were created around small buildings. These included a small fantasy palace dedicated to nymphs and muses, the famous "Grotto of Meudon," based on drawings by Primaticcio from between 1552 and 1560, and decorated with compositions by the artist. It forms a small palace under a platform of arcades, sheltered from view by a hill that visually separates it from the castle, as shown on a print by Israel Silvestre representing the grotto. It was made up of three pavilions backing onto the slope, blending Italian and French styles. The central pavilion, decorated with mosaics, shells, corals and maiolica, sheltered the grotto. Its prime contractor was Primaticcio himself. The first floor of the central pavilion displayed antiques in a large salon.

Historian Henri Sauval wrote that the Diana of Versailles had been brought from Italy and placed in the castle of Meudon, but recent research seems to prove otherwise. This grotto enjoyed immediate success and was praised by Pierre de Ronsard in his "Chant pastoral sur les noces de Charles, duc de Lorraine et Madame Claude, fille du roi" (Pastoral Song on the Wedding of Charles, Duke of Lorraine and Madame Claude, Daughter of the King).

In 1568, Giorgio Vasari wrote enthusiastically about the grotto, whose repute had reached Italy. For the Cardinal of Lorraine, Primaticcio executed many decorations in his great palace called La Grotte (the grotto), of so extraordinary an amplitude that it recalled the baths of antiquity, because of the infinite number and size of its galleries, staircases, and public and private apartments. The construction of this cave was spread out over time, starting with the grotto itself and the two ramps of the staircase (circa 1552–1555), and then, in a second stage, the two pavilions (1559). The lower cryptoportico was then built in a third phase.

At the death of the Cardinal of Lorraine in 1574, the castle remained the property of the House of Guise, who held it as one of their fiefs, along with the castle of Joinville, Haute-Marne.

Meudon was plundered during the French Wars of Religion. Henry I, Duke of Guise barely had the time to visit Meudon. It was at Meudon that the future Henry IV (Henry of Navarre) learned of the assassination of Henry III of France on 1 August 1589 by Jacques Clément. He went the very same day to see the wounded king in nearby Saint-Cloud. The king reassured him about his health. Henry went back to Meudon. Maximilien de Bethune, Duke of Sully, who accompanied him, lodged at "Sauvat", a house in the village. The next day, the king's condition worsened and he died at Saint-Cloud. Henry of Navarre became King of France, the first Bourbon king.

Meudon became one of the seats of the League. On July 24, 1605, the marriage of Francois de Bourbon, Prince of Conti (1558–1614) and Louise Marguerite de Lorraine took place in the chapel of the château. In 1618, the Duke of Lorraine tasked his architect, Gabriel Soulignac, with modifying the castle and extending the gardens. Other work was carried out by Soulignac in 1623, with the construction of a terrace and a staircase near the grotto.

In 1639, Jacques Dubreuil boasted of Meudon's stairs and turrets: "The garden is moderately large, made of flower beds, borders, open alleyways, surrounded by alleys covered with beautiful trees, with balusters." In 1641, the painter Nicolas Poussin visited Meudon, no doubt attracted by the famous decorations of Primaticcio. Above all, 18 May 1643, the union of Gaston, Duke of Orleans, brother of Louis XIII with Marguerite of Lorraine, was renewed in the chapel of the castle, with the blessing of the Archbishop of Paris, Jean-François de Gondi.

The domain was plundered under the Fronde, since the Lorraine princes who owned Meudon had taken the side of the rebellion against royal authority. Thus, beginning in 1649, Louis, Grand Condé, at the head of the Royal Army, seized Charenton, Saint-Denis, Saint-Cloud and Meudon.

Views of Chateau de Meudon between the 1550s and 1650s

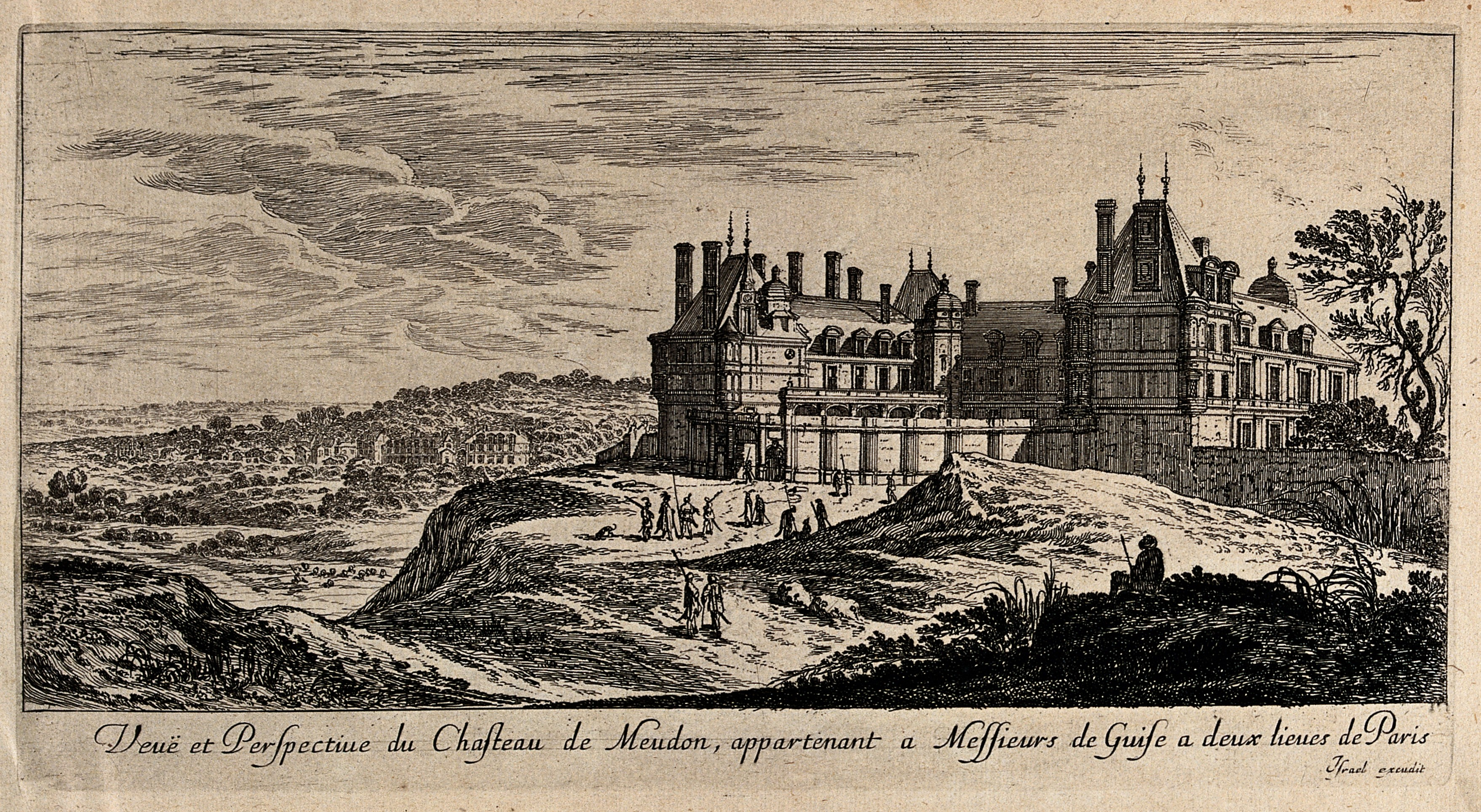
View of the castle of Meudon, c. 1600

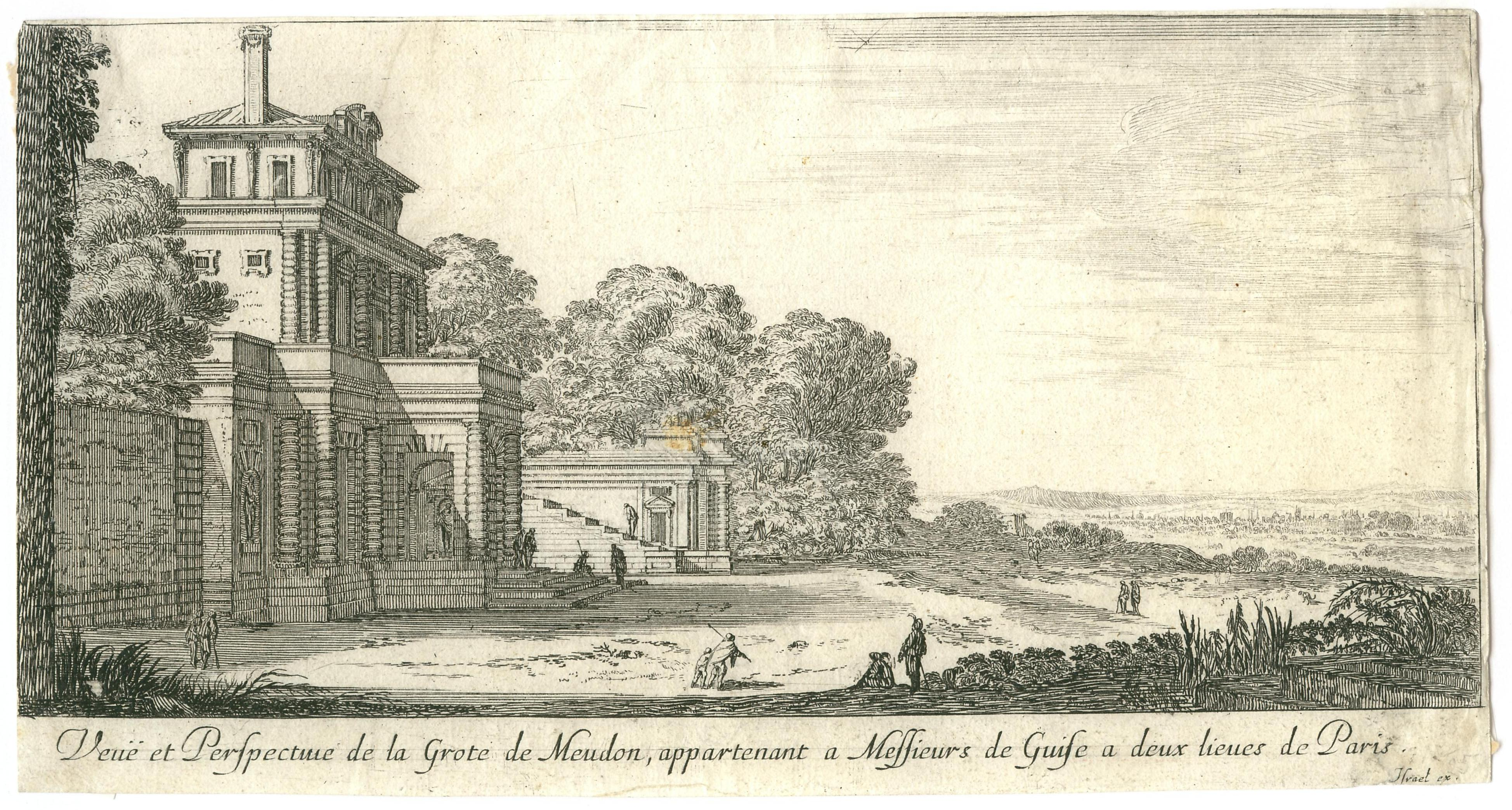
The Cave of Meudon, by Israel Silvestre

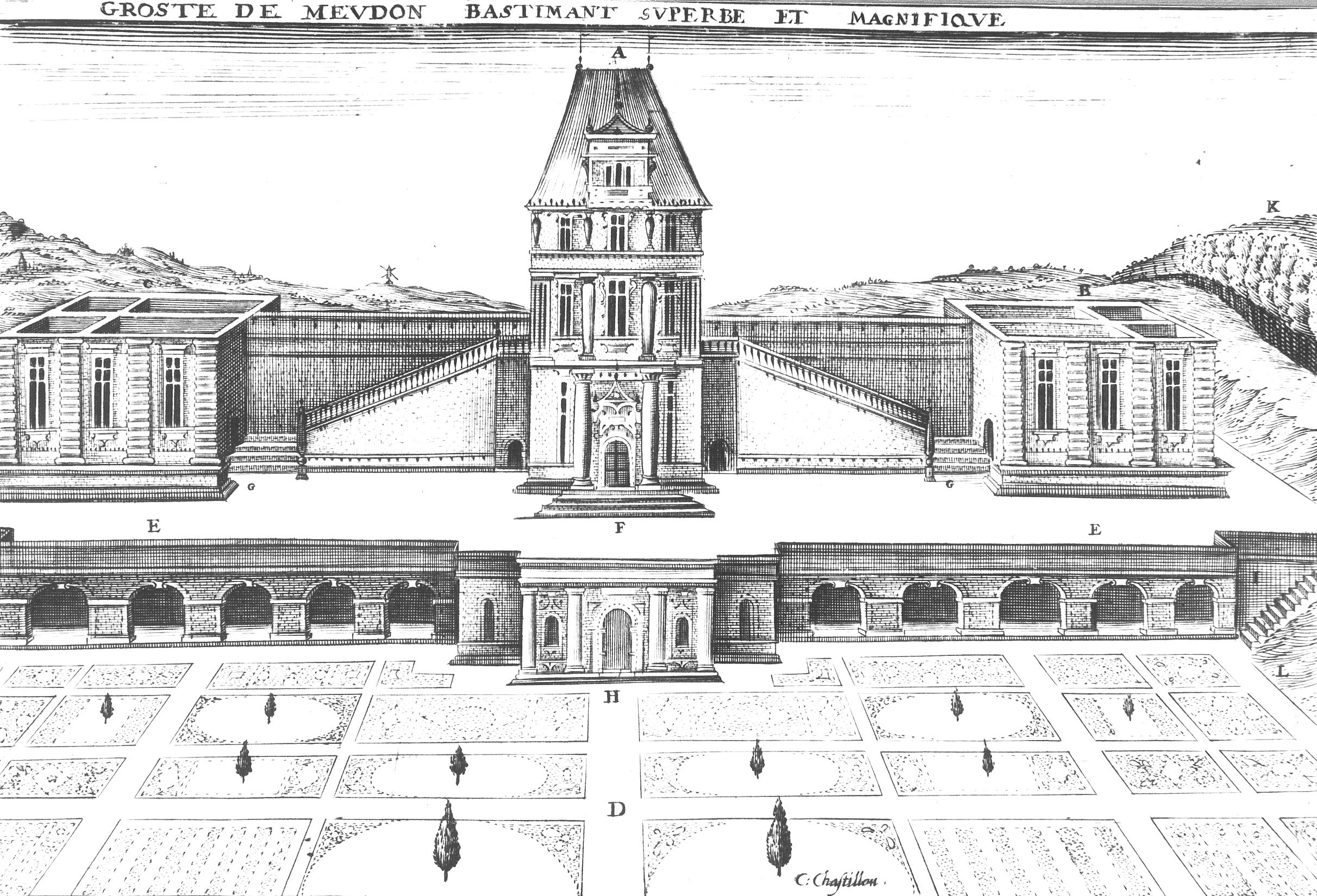
The grotto of Meudon, by Claude Chastillon, c.1600

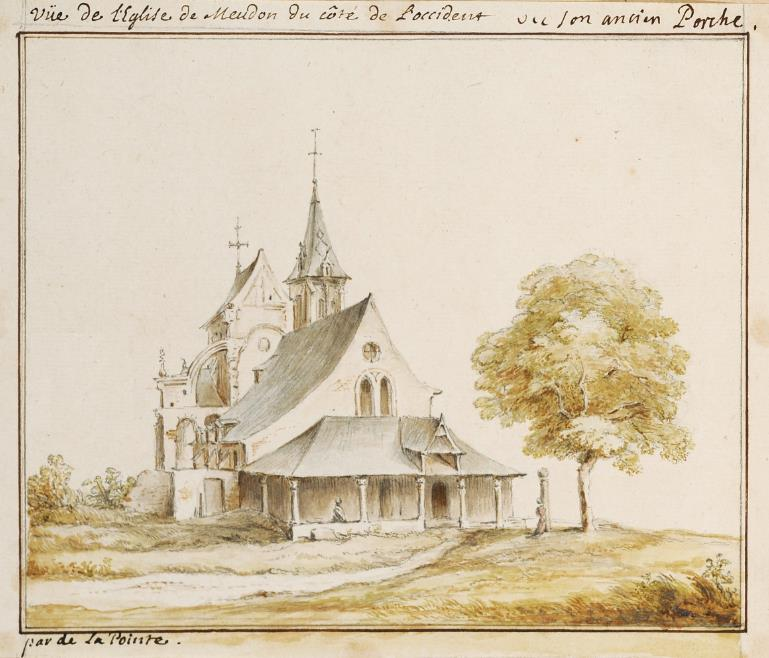
The church of Meudon, c. early 1600s

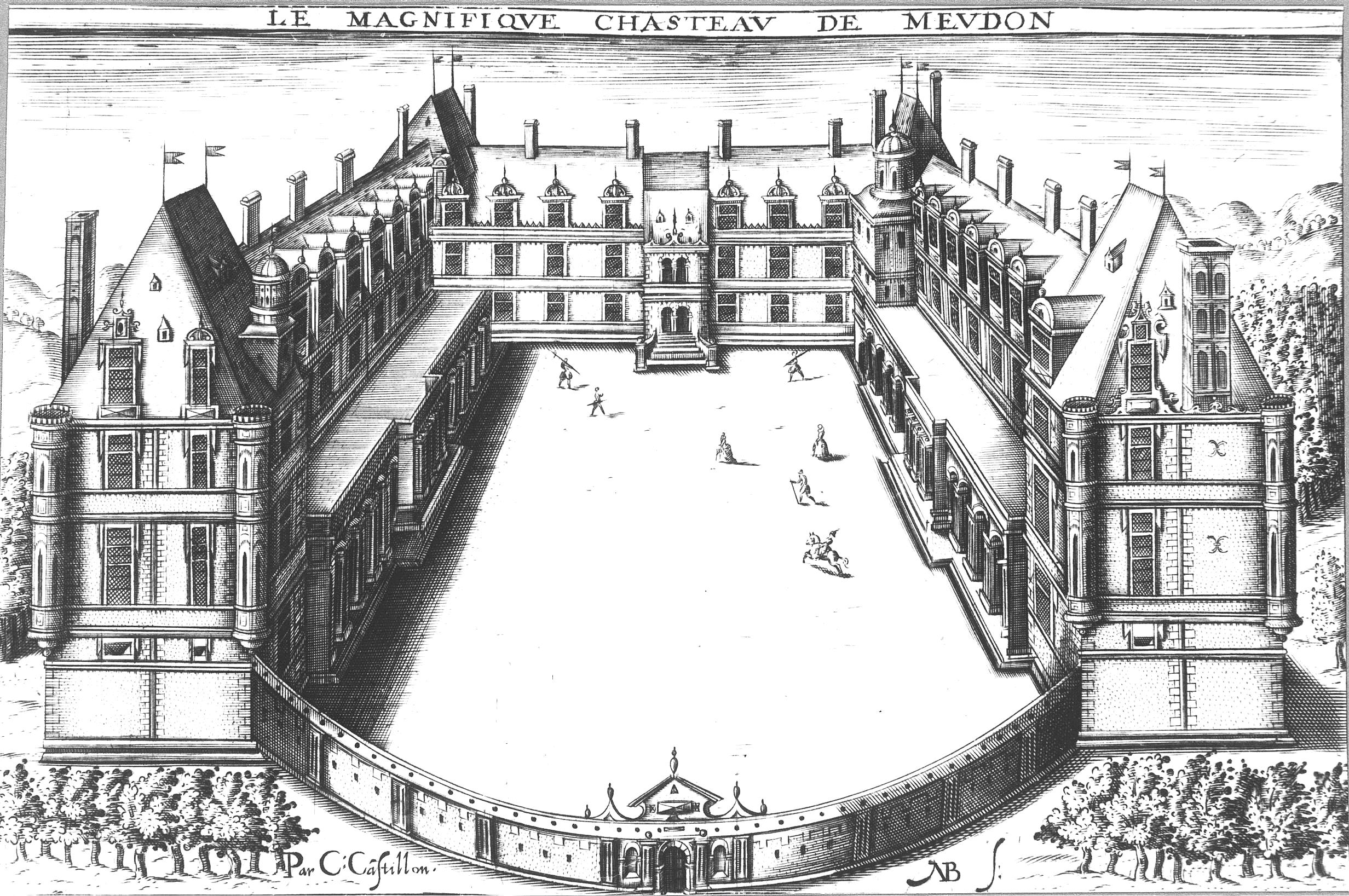
Meudon by Claude Chastillon, c. 1600

=== Grand Siècle ===
==== Abel Servien and the marquis de Sablé (1654–1679) ====
Meudon, in poor condition, was bought on 12 September 1654 by Abel Servien, Superintendent of Finances, who took the title of Baron de Meudon. As soon as the purchase was made, Servien had extensive renovation work done by the architect Louis Le Vau. He was at the peak of his career, and felt that Meudon should reflect this power. In Paris, Servien lived at the Hôtel de la Roche-Guyon near the Palais-Royal at least from 1651 to 1659. The castle was richly furnished and decorated. The central section was replaced by an octagonal pavilion, surmounted by a high roof shaped like a truncated pyramid. In the center of the pavilion was a large double spiral staircase. A large staircase, adorned with twelve columns of marble monoliths, precedes it. The first floor housed a large cupolaed salon, opening onto the gardens, similar to the one built at the time by Nicholas Fouquet at the château of Vaux-le-Vicomte. Servien had a large terrace built in the forecourt in order to clear the view of the castle, thereby engulfing nearly a third of the village of Meudon, which he moved elsewhere.

On the garden side, he built a monumental orangerie, still preserved today. He enlarged the park, which had existed since at least the Duchesse d'Étampes. Through many land purchases, he managed to put through a "Grande Perspective" south of the castle, featuring basins and ponds, including those of Chalais. Letters patent dated 31 August 1657 bear "permission to extend the park of Meudon, enclose it in walls, even though the acquired inheritances are in the neighborhood of the pleasures of His Majesty," or in other words, of the neighboring Palace of Versailles.

When Queen Christine of Sweden came to France, she offered Servien a bronze by Adrian de Vries, Mercury Abducting Psyche, now in the Louvre. Servien had this bronze placed at the end of the flowerbed, just above his new orangery.

Servien died on 17 February 1659 at Meudon itself in his apartment on the ground floor, after having spent a true fortune on Meudon, which was still under construction. His son, Louis-François Servien, marquess of Sablé and protector of Jean de La Fontaine, kept the estate for twenty years. On 2 August 1665, Gian Lorenzo Bernini visited Meudon.

Financial constraints finally forced Louis-Francois Servien to sell Meudon to François-Michel le Tellier, Marquis de Louvois in 1679. Already, a year earlier in 1678, members of the Académie Royale d'Architecture visited Meudon, and found that "what was renovated on the garden side of the castle in the days of M. Servien is very ruined, particularly the cornice of the central pavilion," (P.V.I. 193).

The Chateau de Meudon between 1654 and 1679

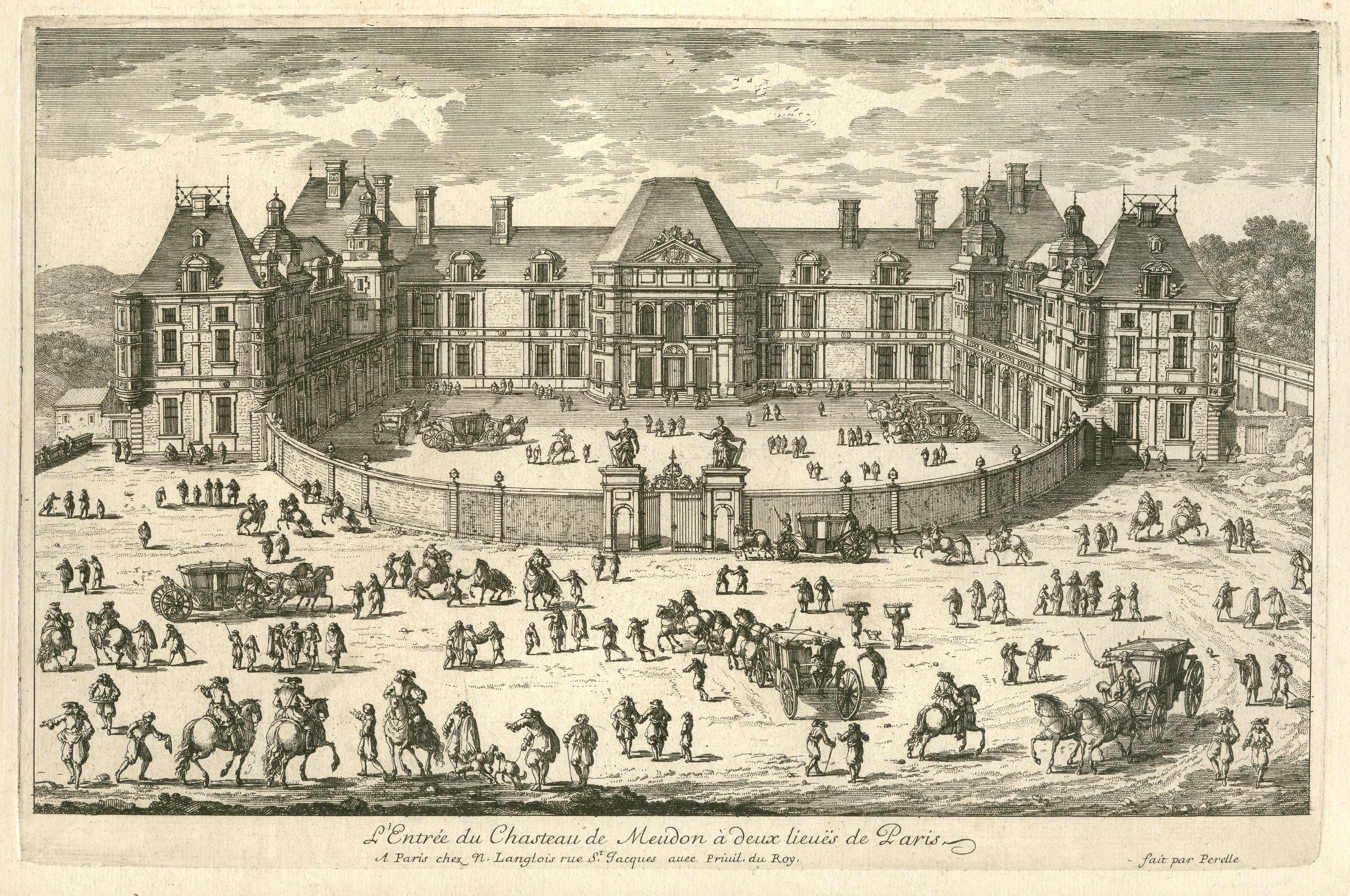
Castle at the death of Abel Servien in 1659

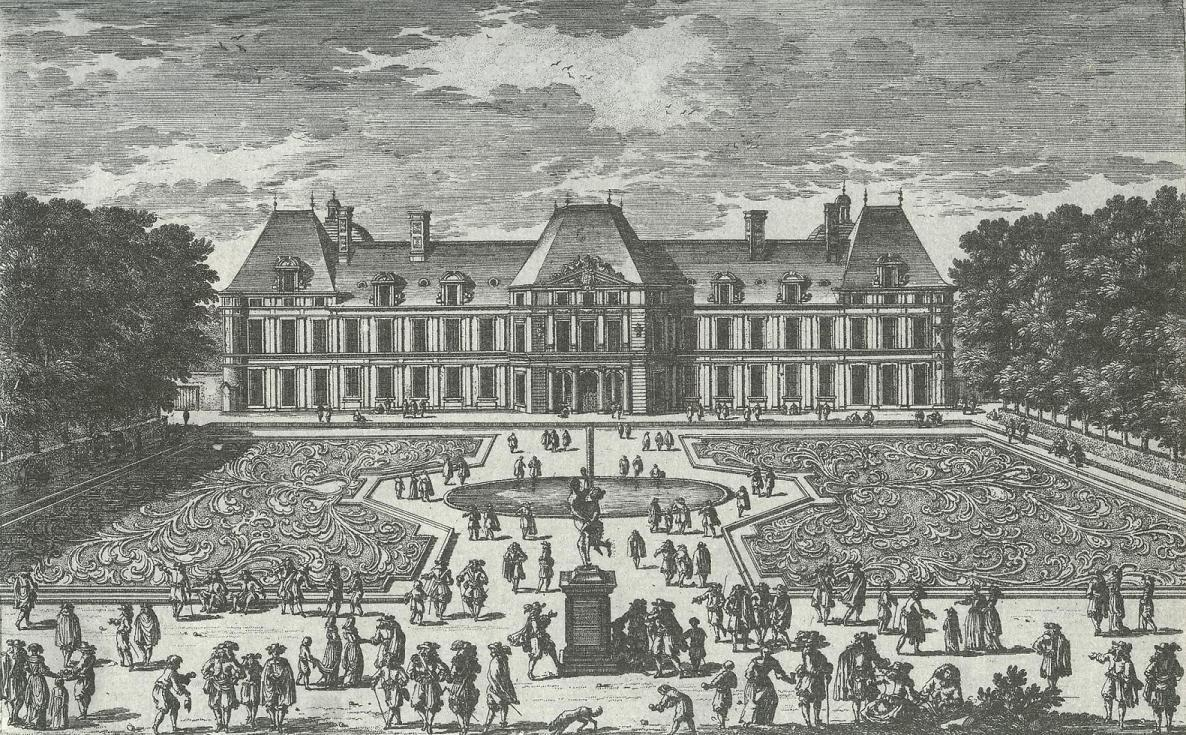
Parterre of Meudon and the statue of "Mercury and Psyche", c. 1660

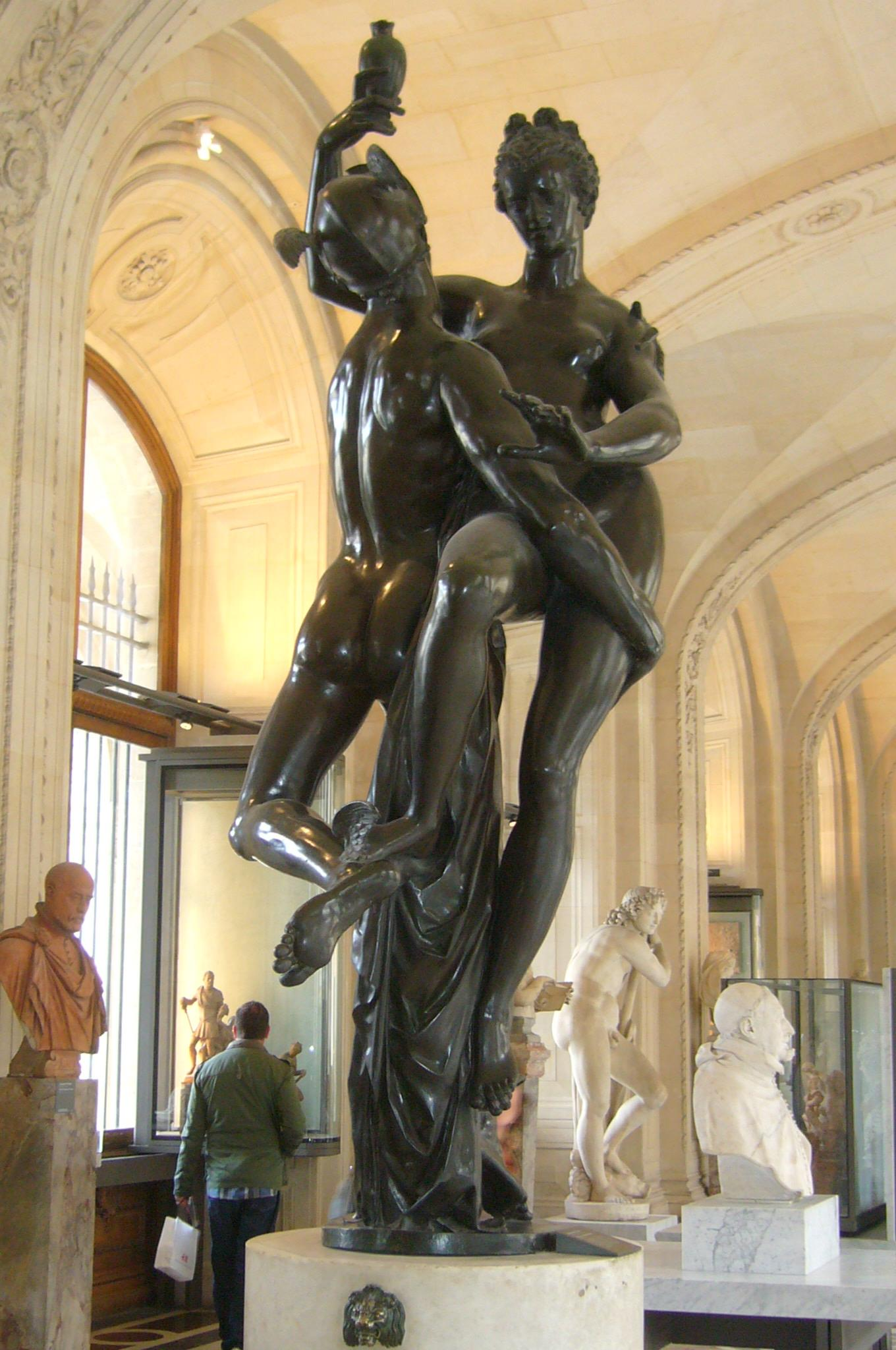
Mercury and Psyche, bronze by Adrien de Vries

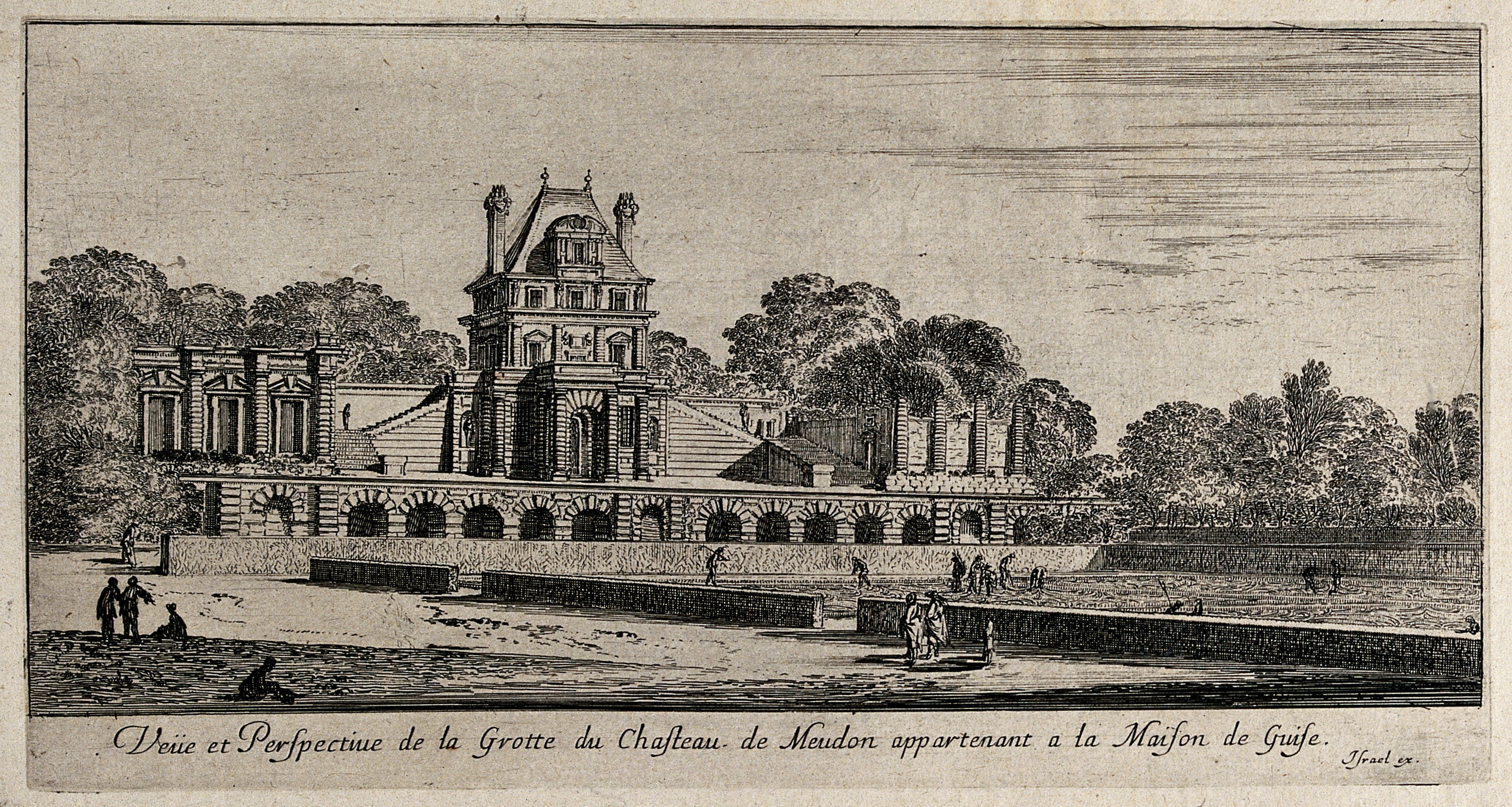
The grotto in the state where Servien found it in 1654

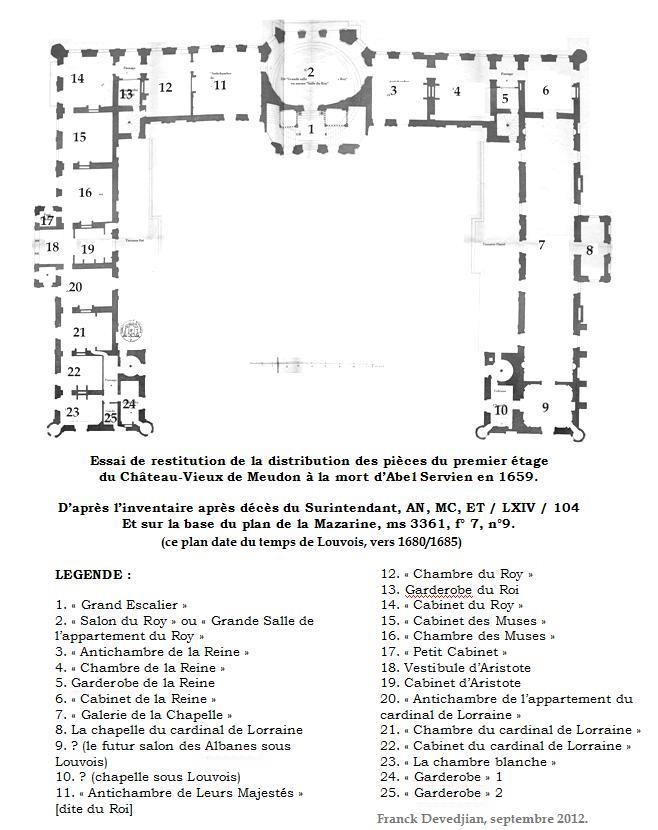
Meudon by Claude Chastillon, c. 1600

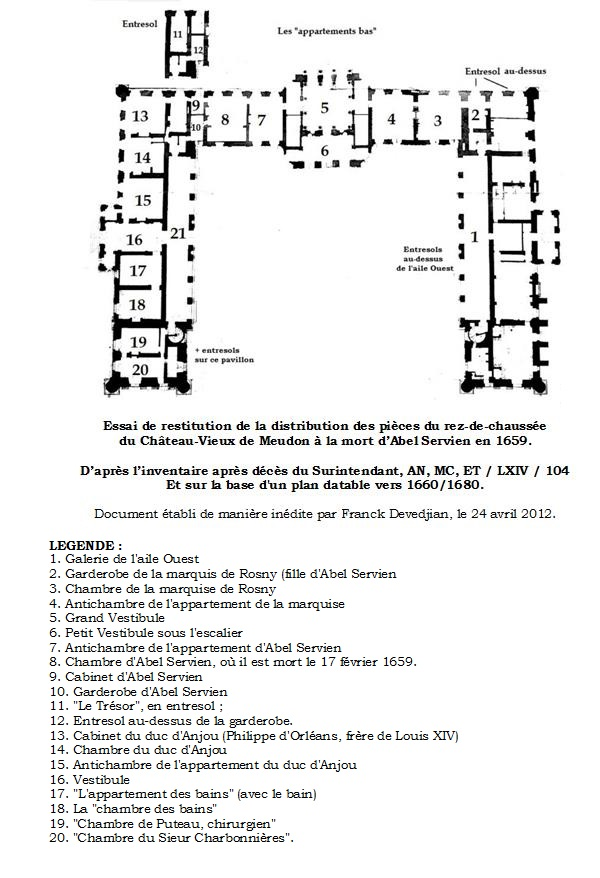
Layout of the ground floor of the old castle c. 1659

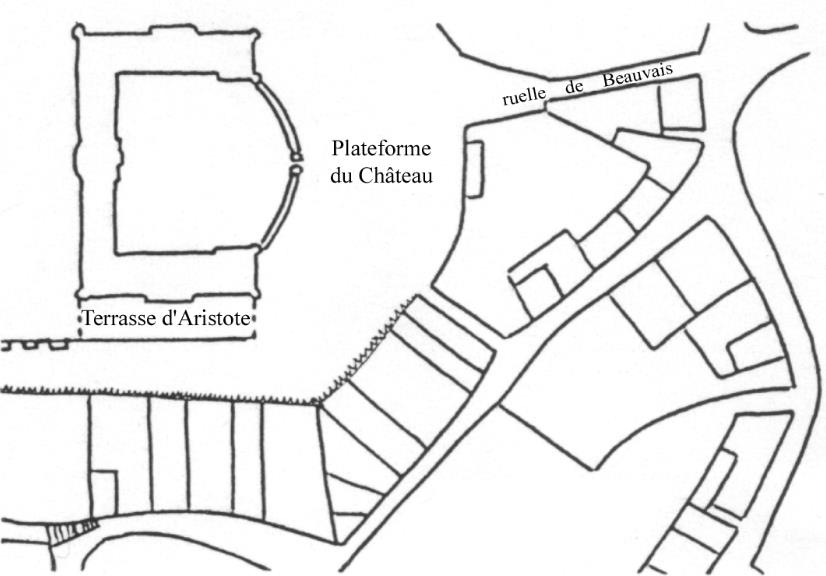
Sketch of the castle entrance and the village c. 1654

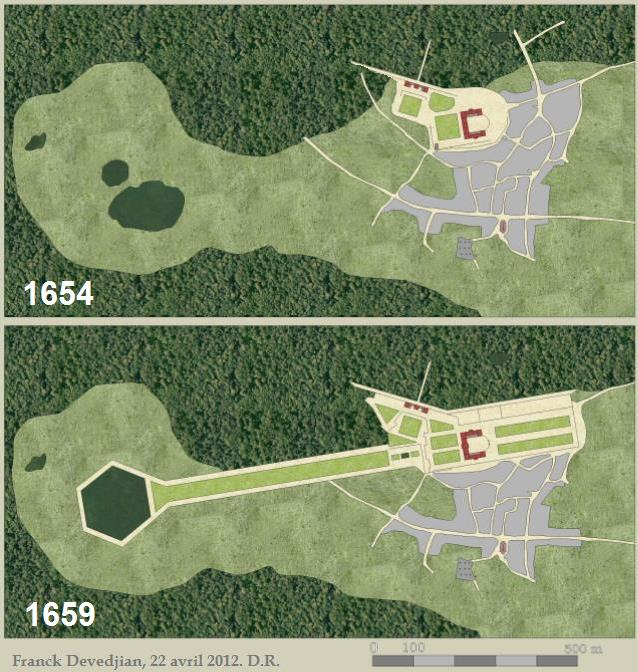
Evolution of Meudon by Abel Servien between 1654-1659

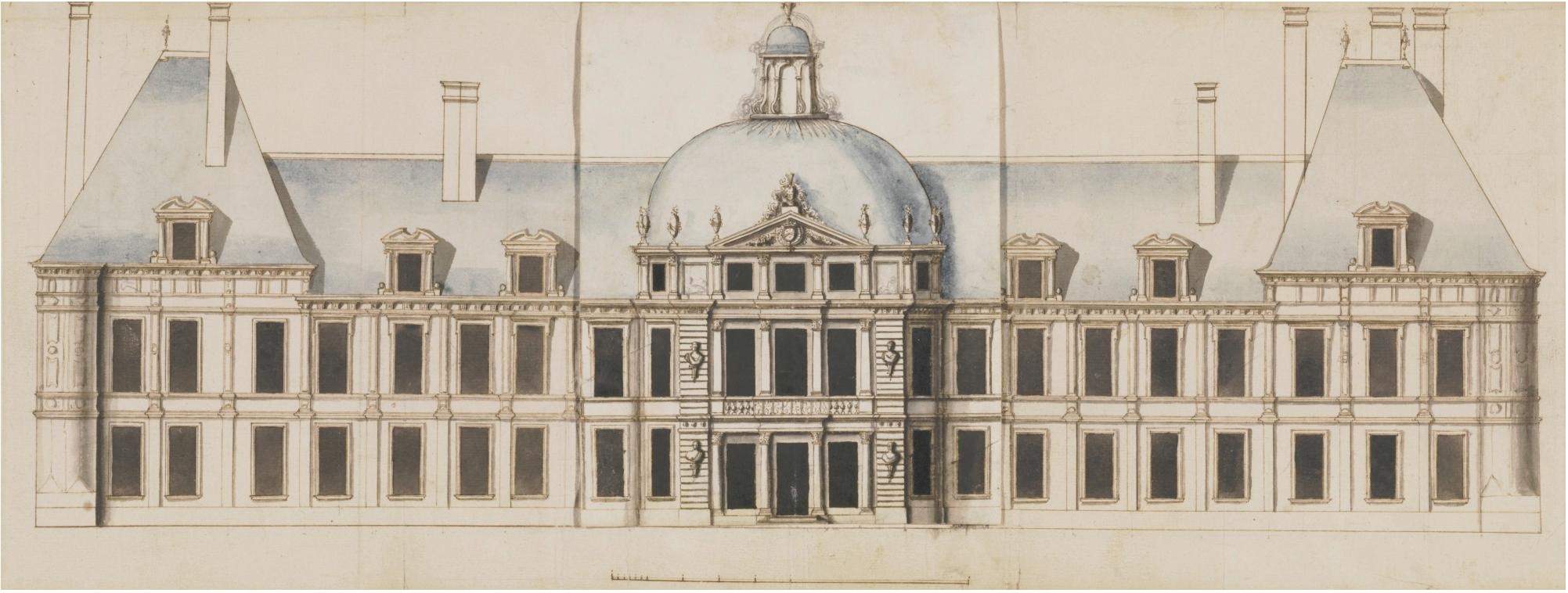
Unfinished project by Louis Le Vau to modify the central pavilion of the Vieux-Château. c. 1655

==== Louvois and his wife, Anne de Souvré (1679–1695) ====
For the powerful minister, who called himself "M. de Chaville" in his youth, the site of Meudon was ideal. It was near both Versailles and the Château of Chaville, where the family property was located. It was rebuilt by his father, Michel Le Tellier. Louvois obtained the superintendence for the buildings in 1683, then embarked on a series of grandiose rearrangements. He enriched the façade of the château with busts and balconies on columns of gray marble. He sumptuously redecorated the whole interior. He had woodwork installed in 1684.

Above the doors were floral paintings in the style of Jean-Baptiste Monnoyer. A cabinet displayed miniatures of the groves of Versailles painted by Jean Cotelle the elder, doubtless a gift from Louis XIV in 1688 to thank his minister for the perfect completion of the marble Trianon de porcelaine. The large gallery, which occupies the entire right wing on the first floor, is adorned with twelve paintings by Adam Frans van der Meulen on the great battles of the reign.

Louvois and his wife and vignette
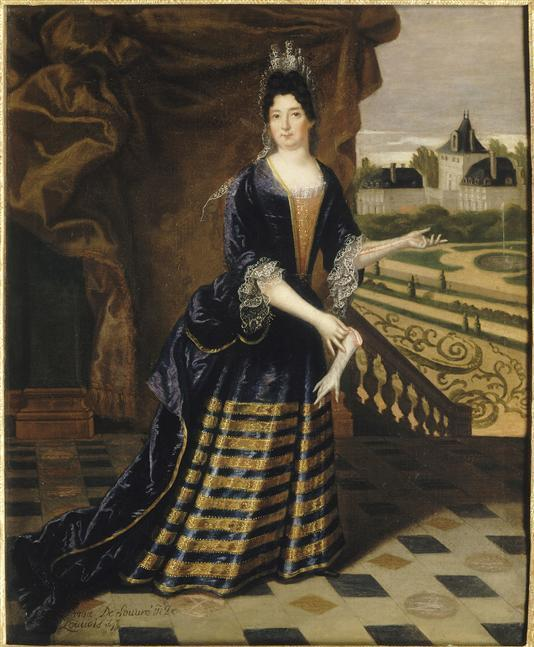

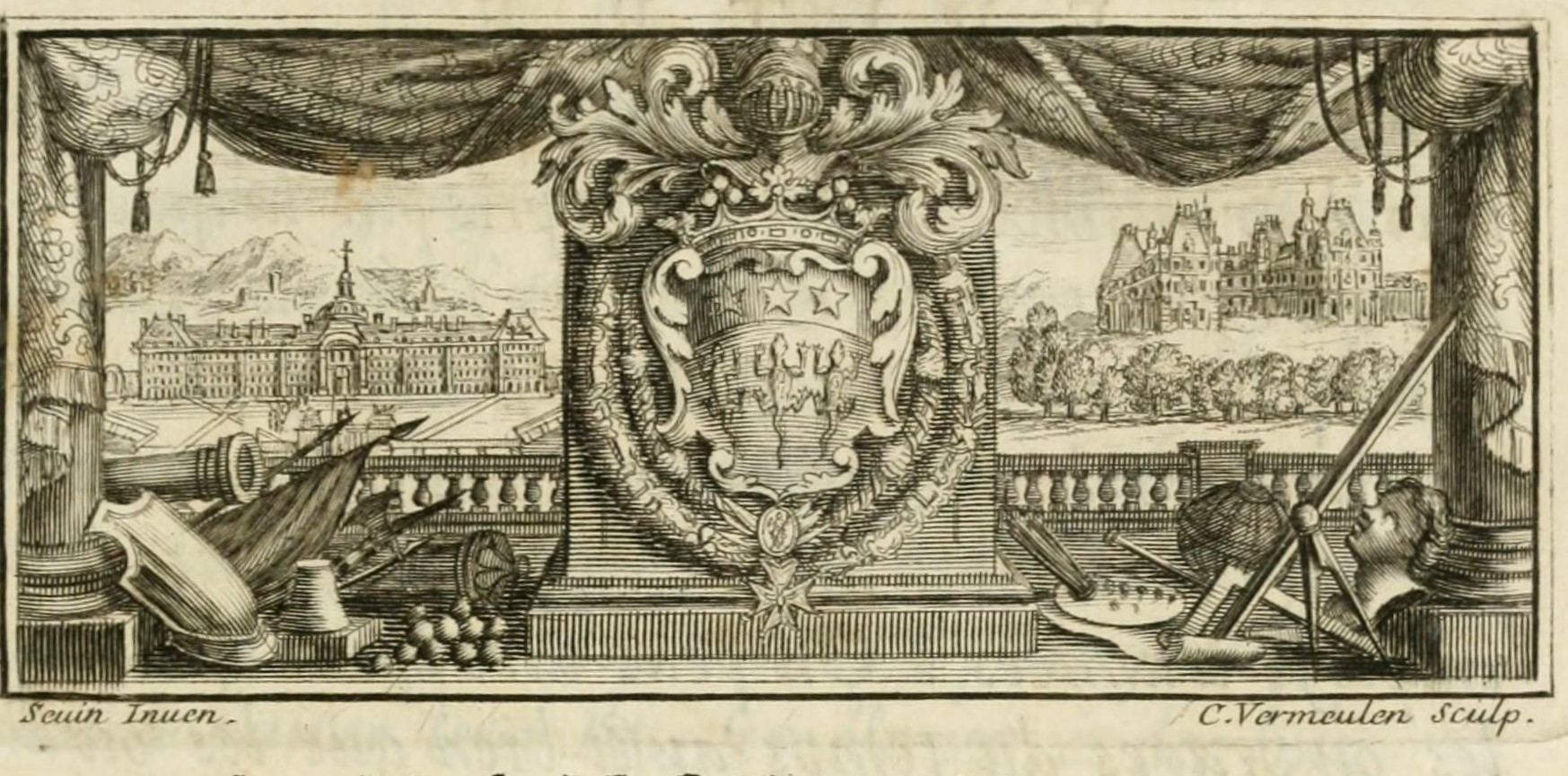
Madame de Louvois in Meudon. At the back is the parterre and the Grotto

Nicodemus Tessin the Younger noted the following during his visit to the castle in 1687.

"The most remarkable in the house was the ceiling painted in oils directly on the vault by M. de La Fosse. At the four corners of the composition, simulating stucco, two seated figures and two standing figures were painted: in the corners and between the statues, the ceiling was painted in oils directly on the vault by Charles de La Fosse. In the corners and between the statues, there was something like an oeil-de-boeuf, through which the sky could be seen. Beside the figures and to make them stand out all the better, rich rugs of different colors, and between the first and the other corner, large ovals, in the center of which was depicted Pandora. Beside them, Mercury was particularly well painted. The vault stretched over the upper cornice, and the shadow below made a very good effect. The large stucco listels all around were completely gilded. The adjoining room must also have been painted by M. de La Fosse. Above, in the oval room, the mirrors made a very good impression. They were arranged circularly and were as tall as the five windows. There was only a woodwork halfway up the wall. In each panel were placed three ice sheets, about 6 qv. High and, when you were in the center of the panel, you could see each other in the three windows at once. The gallery was nicely decorated with a number of tables of jasper, busts, etc., and all the King's actions were to be painted by Van der Meulen; Two were already completed. At one end of the gallery there was a drawing-room, in which the table and the whole panel between the two windows were lined with mirror glass, and the opening of the doors was so great that, from afar, one could almost see the whole gallery. There is, moreover, a profusion of very large and beautiful mirrors. The furniture was very fine, but not of a peculiar taste. Every winter they were removed because of soil moisture. Beneath, in M. de Louvois's own room, there were three pipes of copper that permitted heat to pass at will. This heat came from a copper stove placed in the chimney of the neighboring room. A ventilation pipe passing under the vestibule arrived at this chimney, and then distributed the heat, when the window of this chamber was opened (like the "heat-making machine" at Versailles).

Borne to one of the sides of the stable by pillars of stones or buttresses, the house is externally in very bad condition. The site is rugged to the possible but nevertheless very pleasant. The central aisle below in the garden in front of the terraces, is covered with turf and 70 yards wide.Then, in the middle of an alley of sand of eight yards wide, are spruces and other trees; Then, on two sides, a new lawn of nine yards, and again a sandy alley with trees eight yards wide. The parterre of M. Le Nostre, in the middle, in front of the cave that I have drawn, is very nice, so the two "embroidery" in the center in front of the house, with two marble vases and marble statues around the oval basin, hand-built as tiles did not do a bad effect. I also drew the boxes of the orange trees there, taking them separately. This garden is surrounded, as well as the park, by a wall at least seven miles in circumference. At the bottom of the garden was another large pleasure-house, which M. de Louvois had bought for life for M. Honoré Courtin Courtin."

Outside, Louvois had extensive hydraulic works to power the waterways of the park, and allow the spectacular water jets. The upper park was developed, while Le Nôtre worked on the gardens continually throughout the 1680s and created practically all of the lower gardens, invented new groves and parterres, including the one in front of the Grotto. Louvois also arranged a large vegetable garden along the avenue of the castle. In short, he built everything at Meudon that Louis XIV did, in a more spectacular way still, at Versailles at the same time. And he asked Israel Silvestre, drawing master of Louis de France, to engrave the entire estate, which Silvestre carried out with several very spectacular prints, among the most careful of his work."

In July 1681, the Queen of France, Maria Theresa of Spain, came to visit Meudon, where "Mr. de Louvoy had the honor of serving her" On August 17, 1684, Louvois had a great feast prepared for Meudon in honor of Philippe I, Duke of Orléans (1640–1701). On July 2, 1685, Louis XIV, the Dauphin Louis de France, the Dauphine Maria Anna, Monsieur (Orléans) and Madame (Elizabeth Charlotte, Madame Palatine), "accompany the greater part of the Princes and Lords of the Court," come to Meudon, where Louvois treated the King and the whole Court was given a magnificent collation, during which the violins and oboes of the Opera played melodies by Jean-Baptiste Lully "(...)" But M. de Louvo was sorry to see that he was pleased the whole time the king was with him." In 1686, a reception was still given at Meudon, in honor of the Siam ambassadors, who discovered both the gardens and the castle. Louvois was not present to receive them since he was with Madame de Maintenon and the King, to follow the work on the Canal de l'Eure. On August 25, 1689, Louvois again received Philip of Orléans (1640–1701) at dinner in Meudon. On the 29th of June, 1691, two weeks before the sudden death of Louvois, "Monseigneur went to Meudon with Madame Princesse de Conti; they made a snack at the château, and walked for a long time in the park and in the gardens "(Dangeau).

On July 16, 1691, Louvois died suddenly at Versailles. He had reached the point of honors, and the splendor of Meudon symbolized this power materially.

On the proposal of Louis XIV, the widow of Louvois, Anne of Souvré and his son Barbézieux agreed to exchange Meudon for the Château de Choisy and a balance. In the memoirs of the Marquis de Dangeau, on Wednesday, June 1, 1695: "In the morning, the king proposed to M. de Barbezieux the exchange of Choisy with Meudon; He asked her how much Madame de Louvois had taken Meudon in her share; M. de Barbezieux told him that she had taken him for a unit of 500,000 francs; The King told him that he would give him 400,000 of his return, and Choisy, whom he counted for 100,000 francs, if that were agreeable to Madame de Louvois; That he charged him to go and learn of her, but that he did not ask her for any complacency; That he wished that she should treat with him as with a private person, and should think only of his interests. M. de Barbezieux went to Paris to find his mother, who is pleased with the king's offer, and to whom the exchange is well suited. The contract will be signed on the first day; We started talking about business only in the morning, and it was finished in the evening." The castle, valued at 500,000 livres, and already considerably embellished by succeeding owners, came into its most brilliant period, passing to Louis, Grand Dauphin.

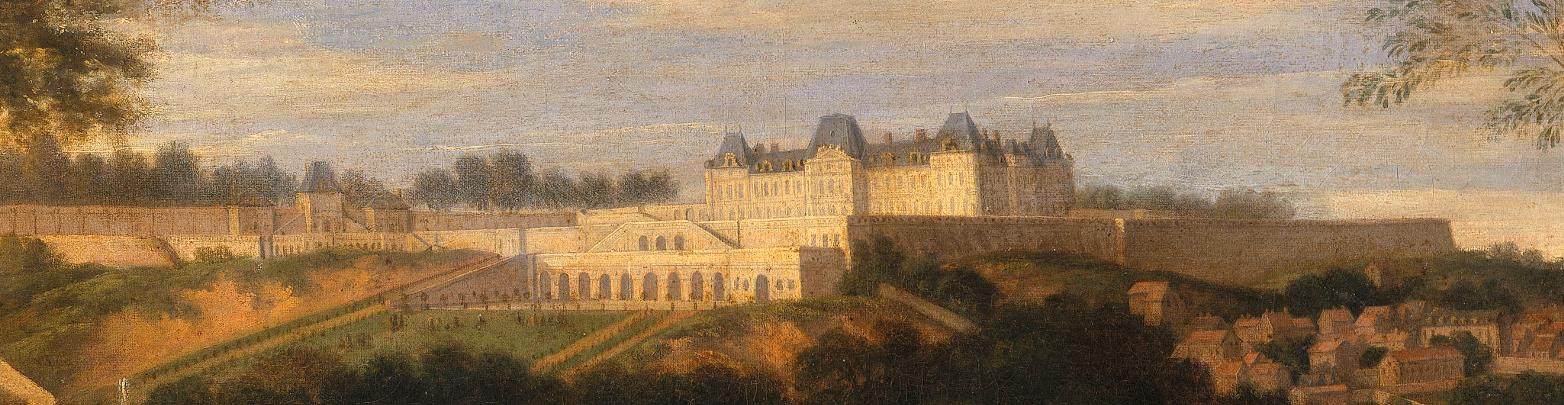
Detail of the painting Louvois chassant à Meudon (Louvois Hunting at Meudon). Musée de Versailles, circa 1683

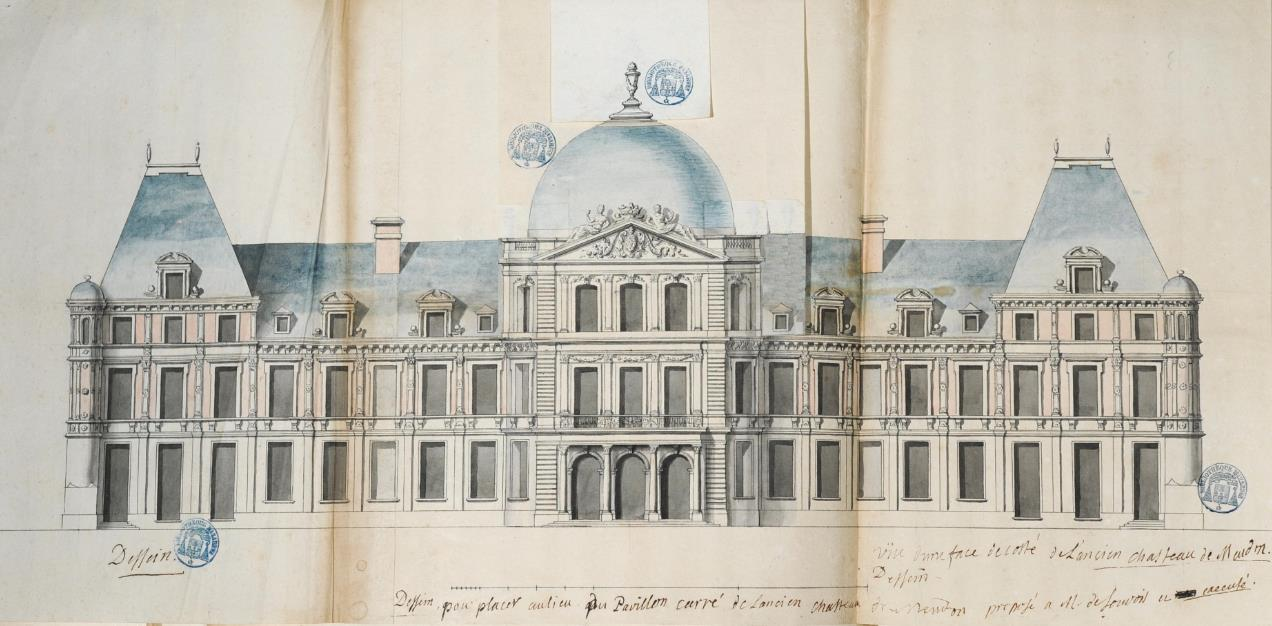
Uncompleted plan for a dome for the central pavilion of the Château-Vieux, by Jules Hardouin-Mansart for Louvois, circa 1685–1691. Bibliothèque Mazarine, ms 3361

Views of Château de Meudon during the period between 1679 and 1695

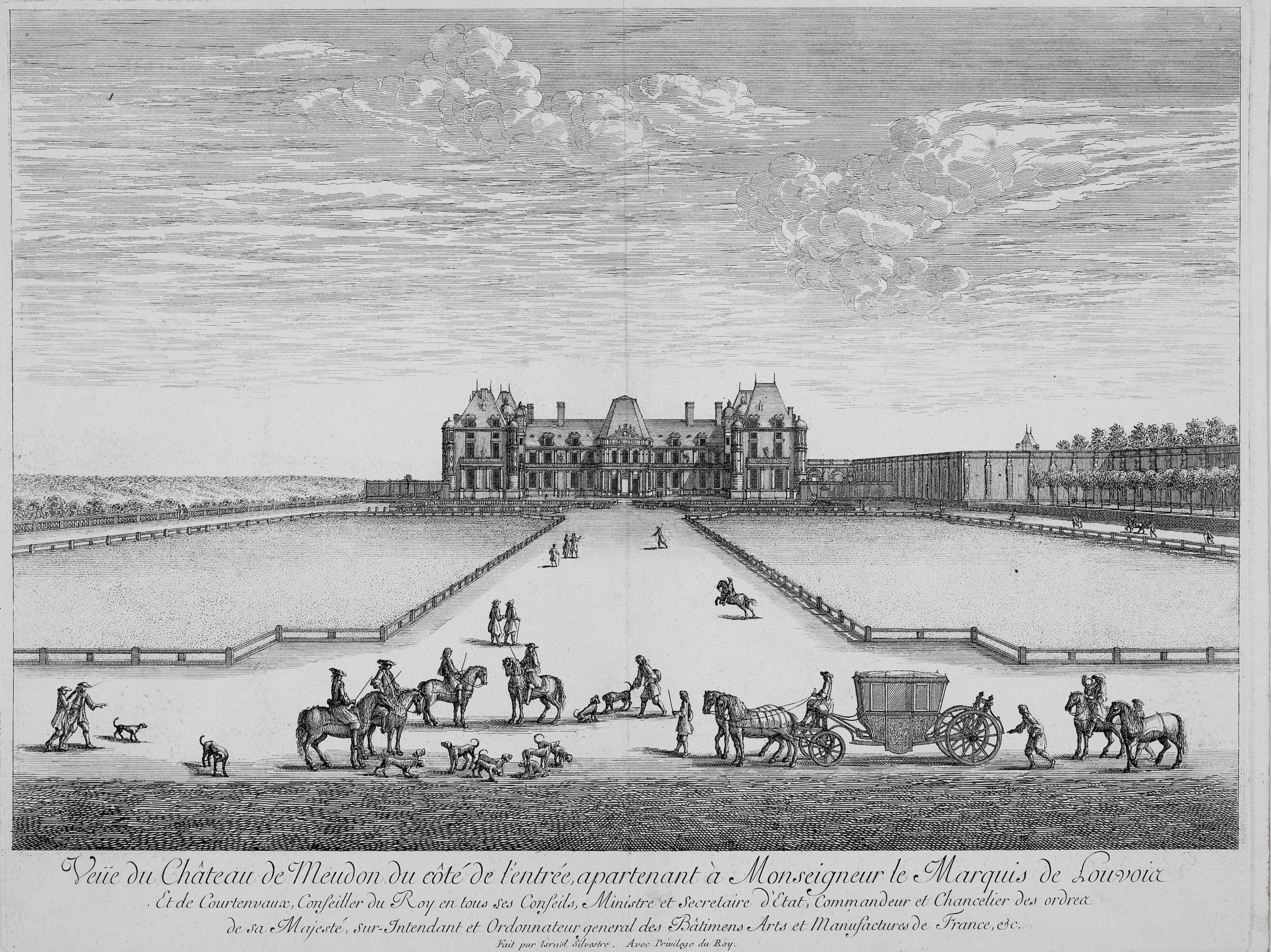
View of the entrance of the château de Meudon, Israël Silvestre, 1685

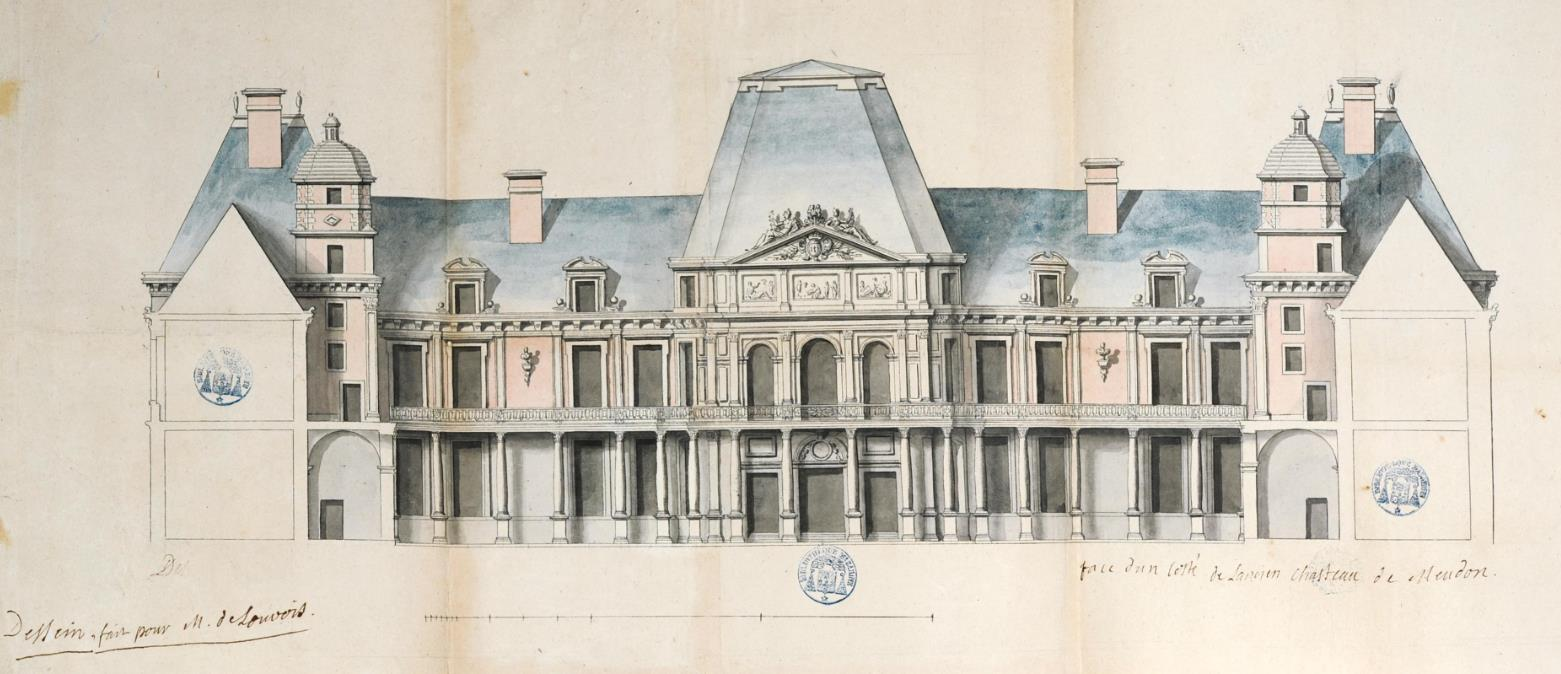
Back of the courtyard of the Château-Vieux. Circa 1685–1690. Bibliothèque Mazarine, ms 3361

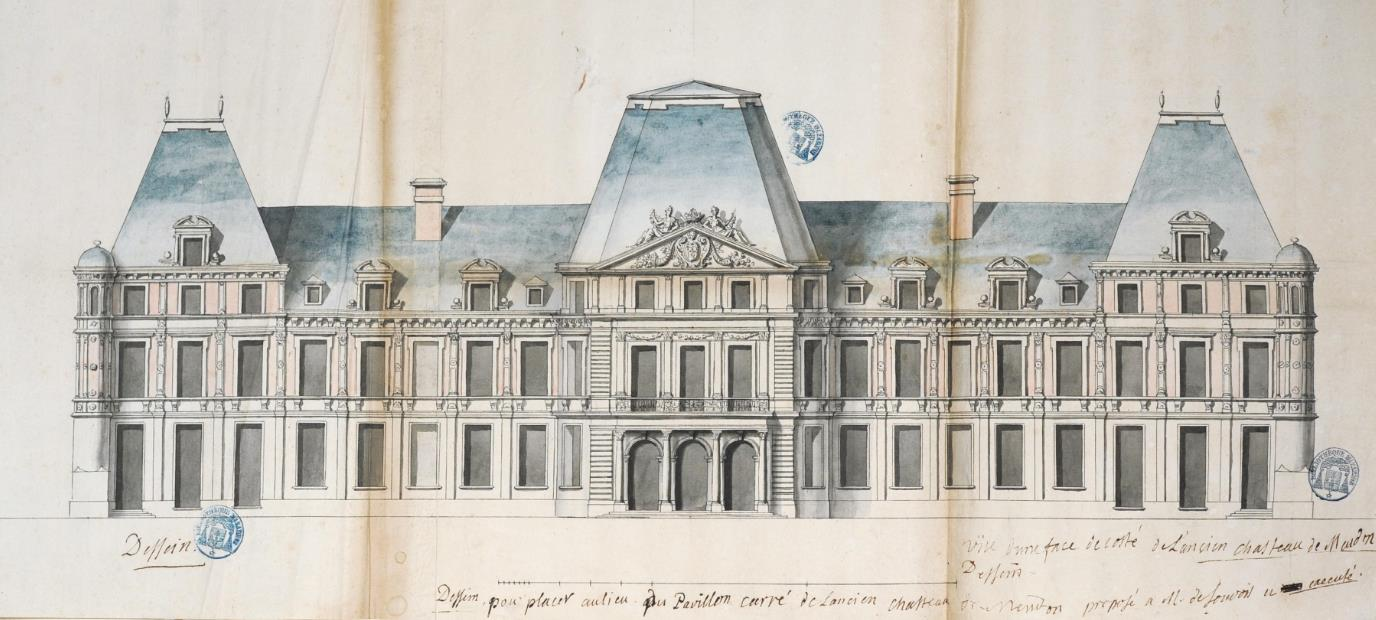
Facade of the parterre side of the Château-Vieux. Circa 1685–1690. Bibliothèque Mazarine, ms 3361

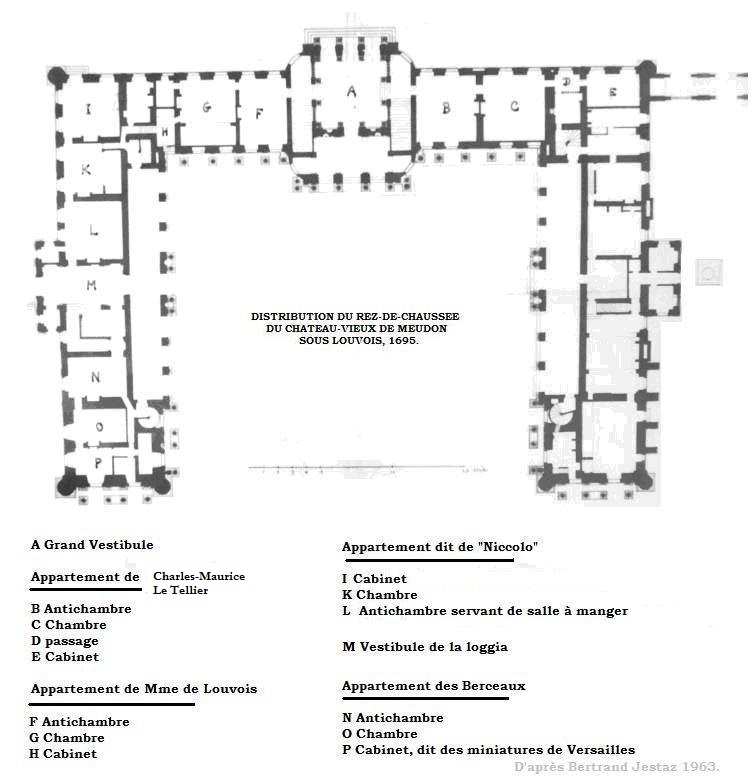
Layout of the ground floor of Meudon after the death of Louvois, 1695

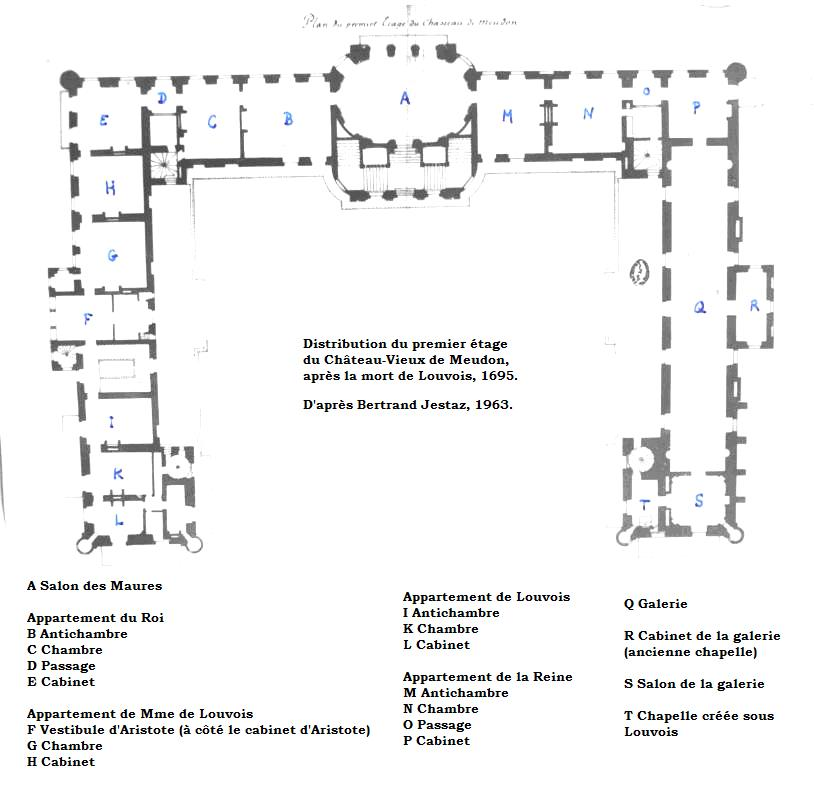
Layout of the first floor of the Château-Vieux after the death of Louvois, 1695

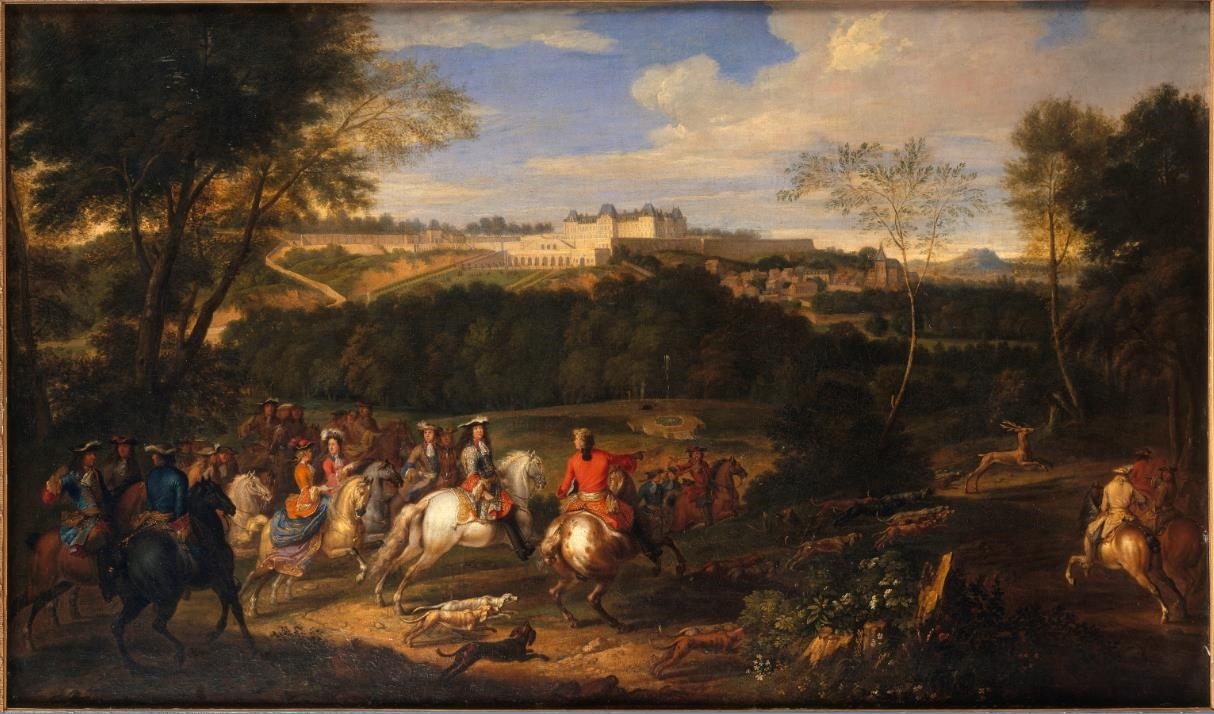
Louvois chassant à Meudon (Louvois hunting in Meudon), c. 1683. Musée de Versailles

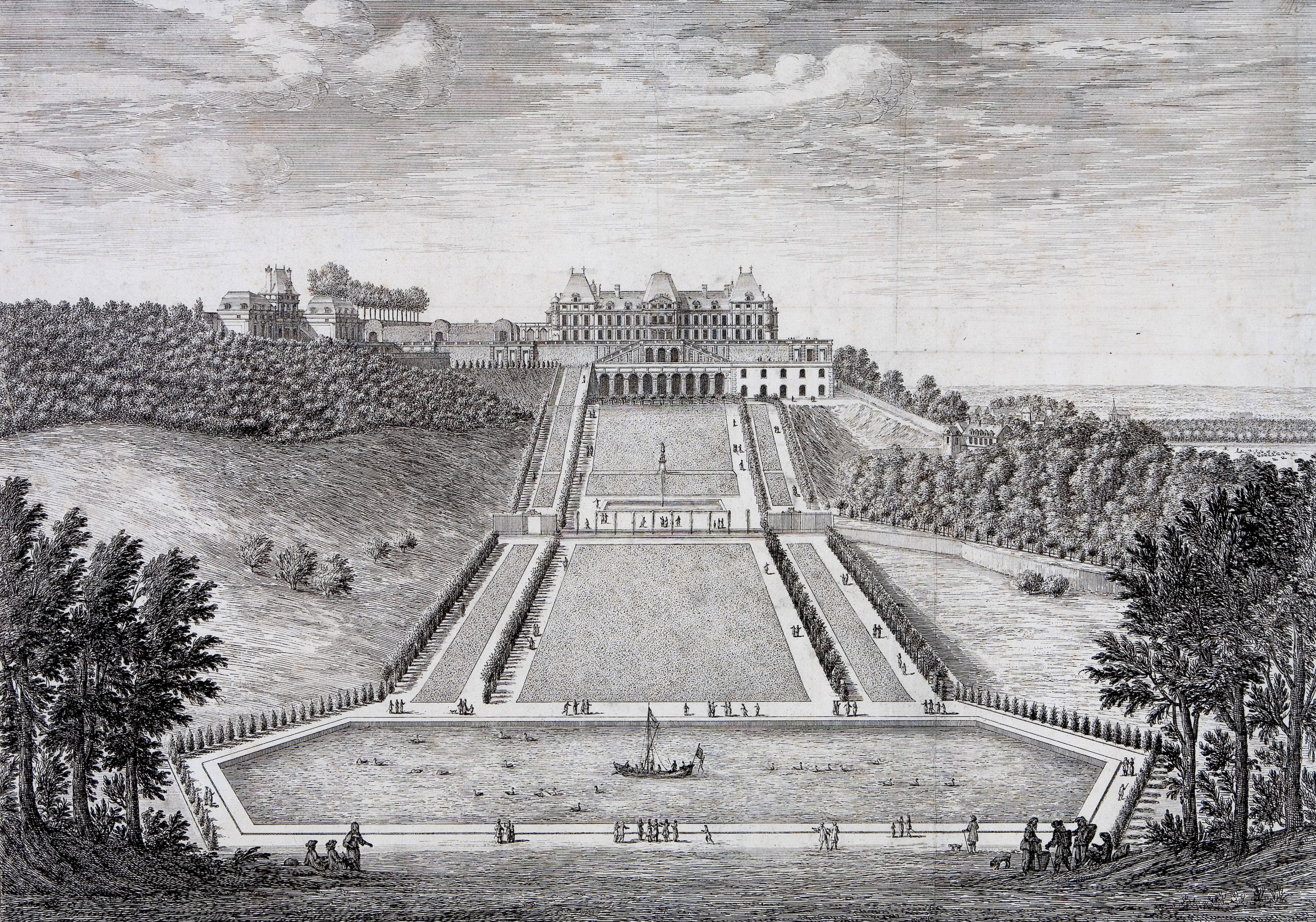
Grande Perspective de Meudon, Israël Silvestre, third quarter of 17th century, Musée d'art et d'histoire de Meudon

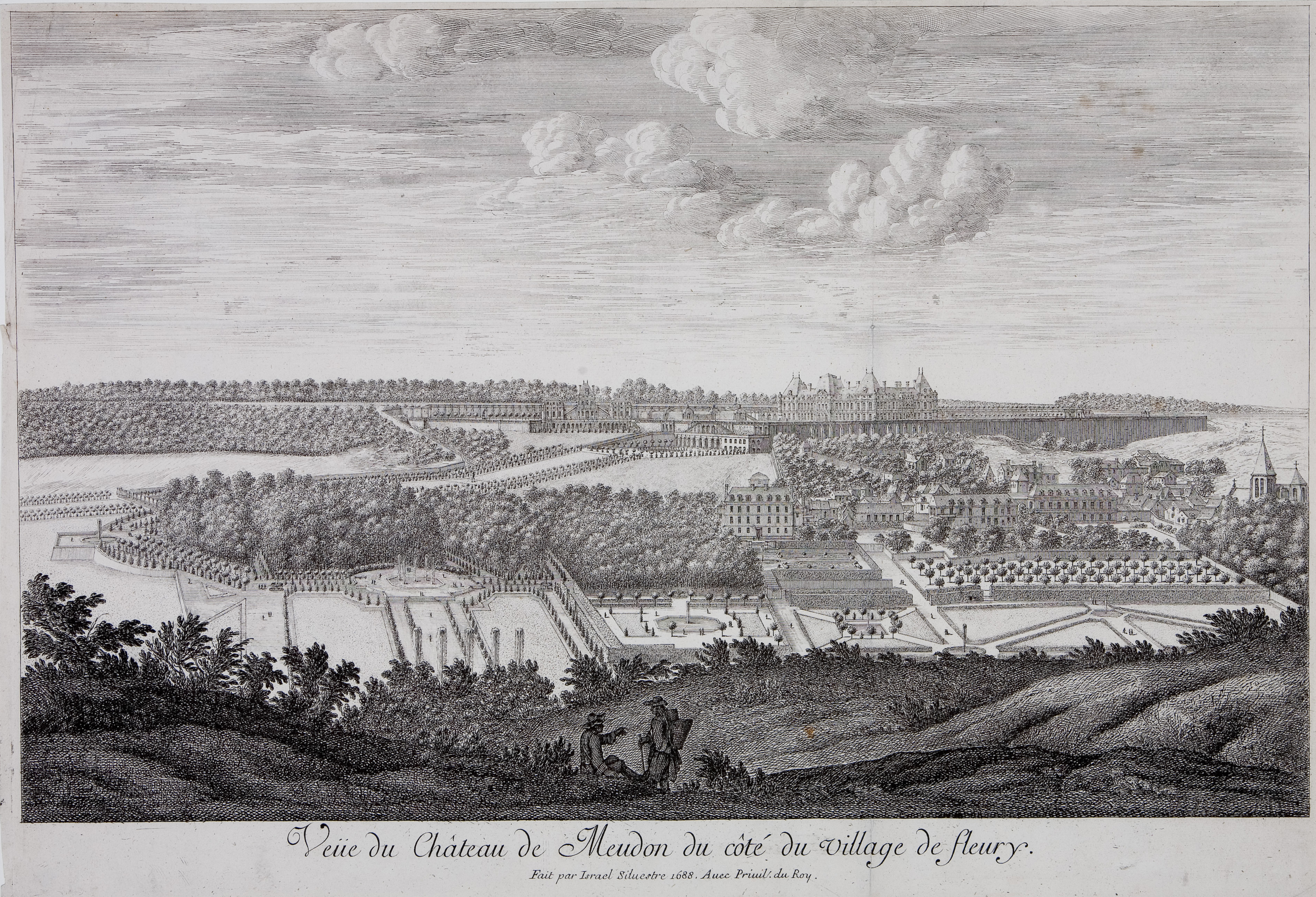
View of the château de Meudon from the village of Fleury), Israel Silvestre, 1688. Musée d'art et d'histoire de Meudon

=== The apogee: Louis XIV and Monseigneur (1695–1711) ===
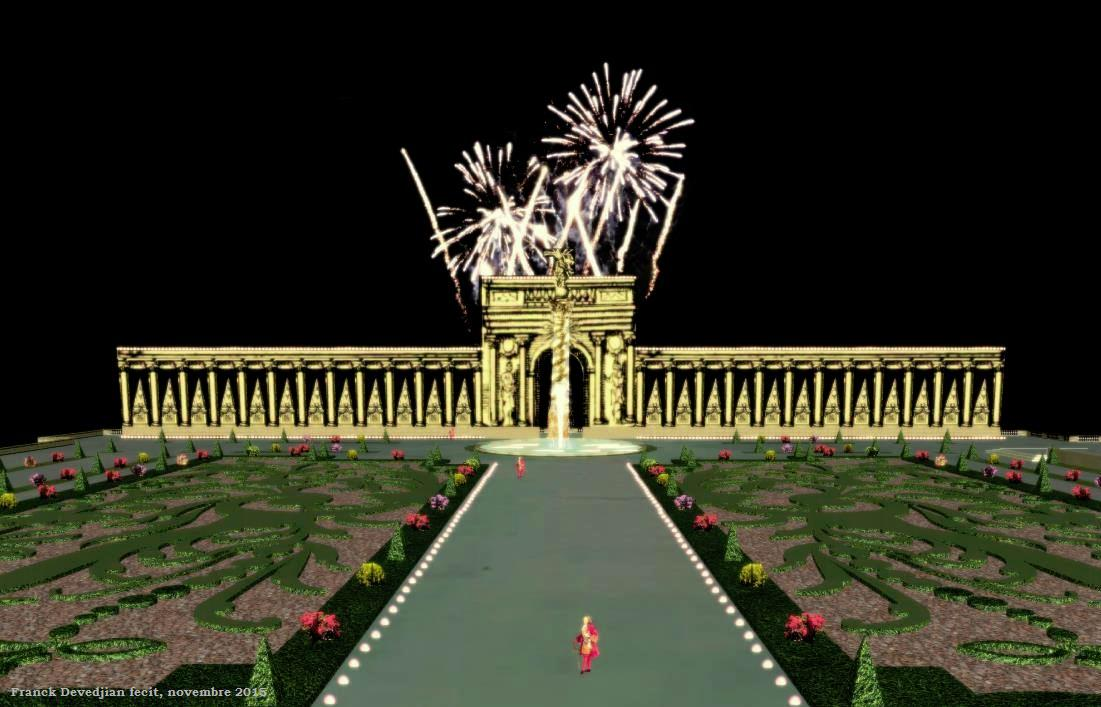
Reconstruction of the illumination on 27 August 1704, in honor of the birth of the Duke of Brittany

==== Works of the prince ====
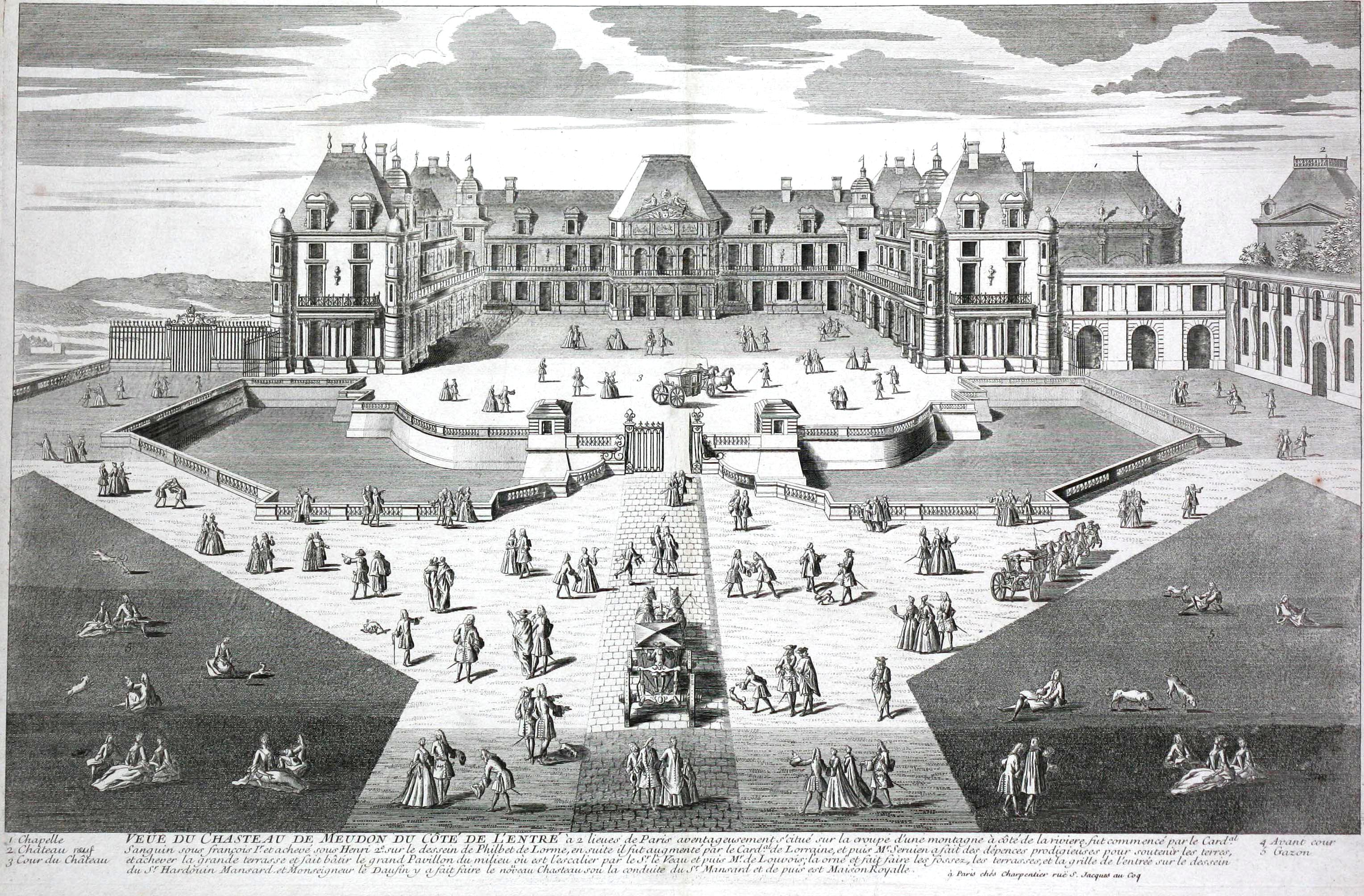
View of the château de Meudon from the entrance, Pierre Aveline, c. 1710

Louis, Grand Dauphin did extensive work at Meudon and turned it into his special showplace, spending a sum of one million one hundred forty thousand French livres, although the king his father had put it among the royal residences and in the charge of the Bâtiments du Roi. Over sixteen years, at least three million livres were spent embellishing and maintaining the estate, a colossal sum. The prince redecorated the apartments to his liking. The Dauphin allowed Meudon to express his own artistic conceptions, breaking with the sometimes compassed aspect of the Louis XIV style. Although not for the first time, Meudon systematically used "Capucine" woodwork, carved and varnished strips of wood with gilt accents.

Regency style partially manifested at Meudon. The Dauphin gathered there his rich collections, which attempted to compete with those of the King: agate vases, Indian fabrics, Gobelin tapestries, Chinese porcelain, paintings by great masters and especially his collection of gems. He did not hesitate to redecorate some rooms several times, removing for example the ceiling painted by Charles de La Fosse to give expression to the light style of Claude Audran III. His main apartment was located the length of the ground floor in the east wing of the Château-Vieux. He also had the parade apartment in the Château-Neuf, as well as a "small fresh apartment" in the chestnut tree wing.

The Dauphin liked to surround himself at Meudon with his family, his friends and courtisans, in particular Marie Adélaïde of Savoy the Duchess of Burgundy, Marie Anne de Bourbon, his daughter-in-law, the Princess of Conti, and Louise Francoise de Bourbon, Duchess of Bourbon, (1673–1743), her two half-sisters, Louis-Antoine de Pardaillan de Gondrin D'Antin son of Madame de Montespan. He also lodged there his mistress, Marie-Émilie de Joly de Choin. Like his father at the Château de Marly, the Dauphin liked to find a relaxed and warm atmosphere in Meudon with chosen companions. To accommodate this large entourage, the Dauphin undertook extensive additions. In 1702, space at the Château-Vieux soon proved inadequate. He had the chestnut tree wing, the former courtyard of the offices, rearranged so as to connect it to the château by a hanging gallery. He arranged a large reception hall on the ground floor. He also built a new commons, which is still visible. He entrusted to Jules Hardouin-Mansart, the architect of all these works, the construction of a chapel. Antoine Coypel, one of the favorite painters of the Dauphin, painted the altar painting, the "Resurrection", a monumental painting, and the "Annunciation", much smaller in size. The sculptures were realized by Noël Jouvenet, François Lespingola and Jean Hardy.

In 1705, space still lacked to accommodate all the courtiers, who were {more and more numerous. At any moment, Monseigneur might become the next king of France, through the death of the aging Louis XIV. The Dauphin then decided to demolish the grotto, which was out of fashion, and to build a new castle, the Château-Neuf . Jules Hardouin-Mansart and Louis XIV collaborated on the project, which was entrusted to the contractors of the chapel and the Palace of Versailles. All the work at Meudon was indeed done by the same artists employed by the King, who worked for the institution of the Bâtiments du Roi.

The Château-Neuf had five levels, but due to the steep slope, did not have the same appearance on the side of the parterre as on the side of the forest. It was composed of three pavilions crowned with roofs with ridge terrace, connected by building wings. This sober architecture, which was not to overshadow the architectural character of the neighboring Château-Vieux, was nevertheless enriched by fine sculptures on the side pavilions, and the central pediments, where angels held the coat of arms of the Dauphin. Inside, a succession of apartments opened onto a large central corridor. The interior decoration, which highlighted the collections of the Dauphin, was composed of woodwork panels varnished or painted in pastel colors, enhanced by gilding. A ceremonial apartment was planned for Monseigneur, since Louis XIV retained his usual accommodation in the Château-Vieux, despite the new construction.

It was imitated some ten years later by the Duke of Antin at the Petit-Bourg castle in Evry.

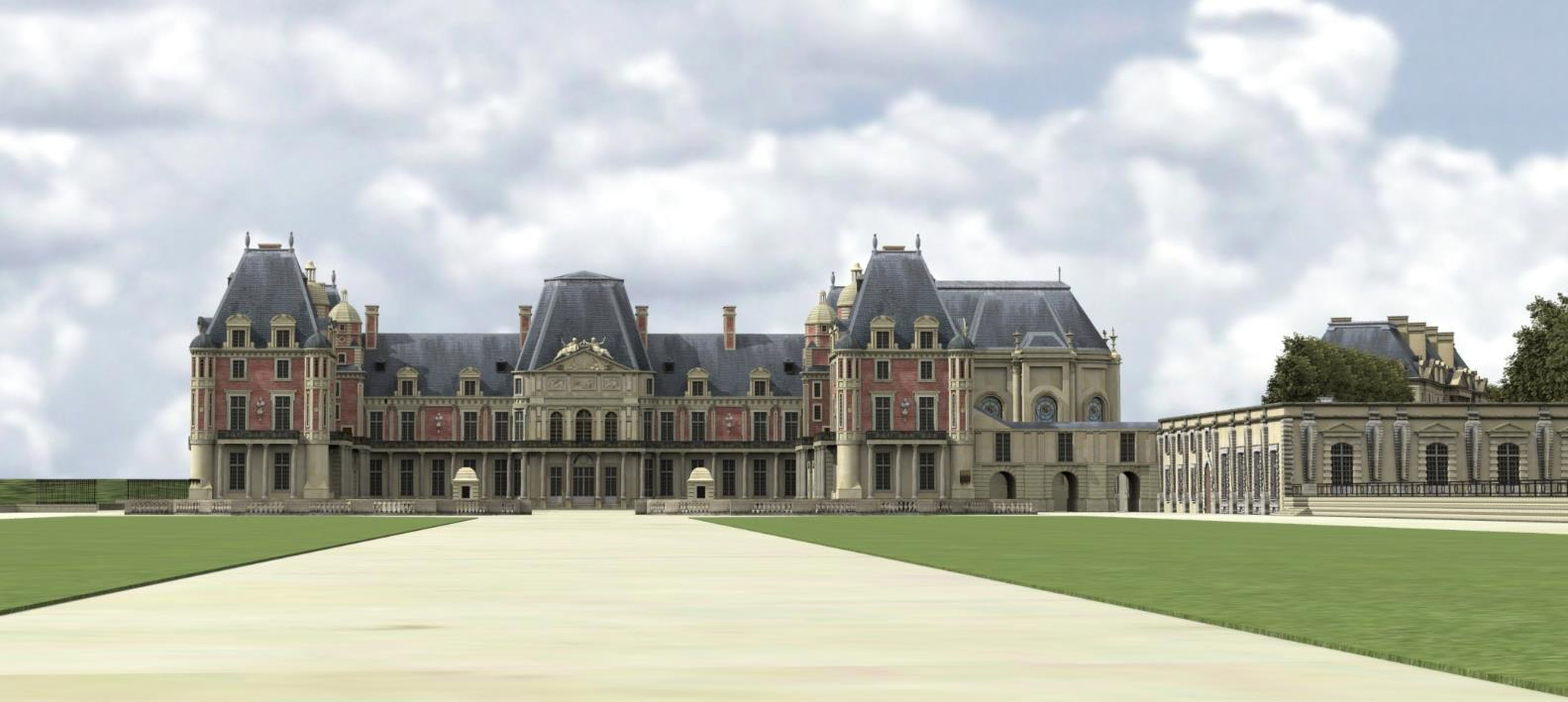
Digital reconstruction of the Château-Vieux as it appeared prior to the 1795 fire

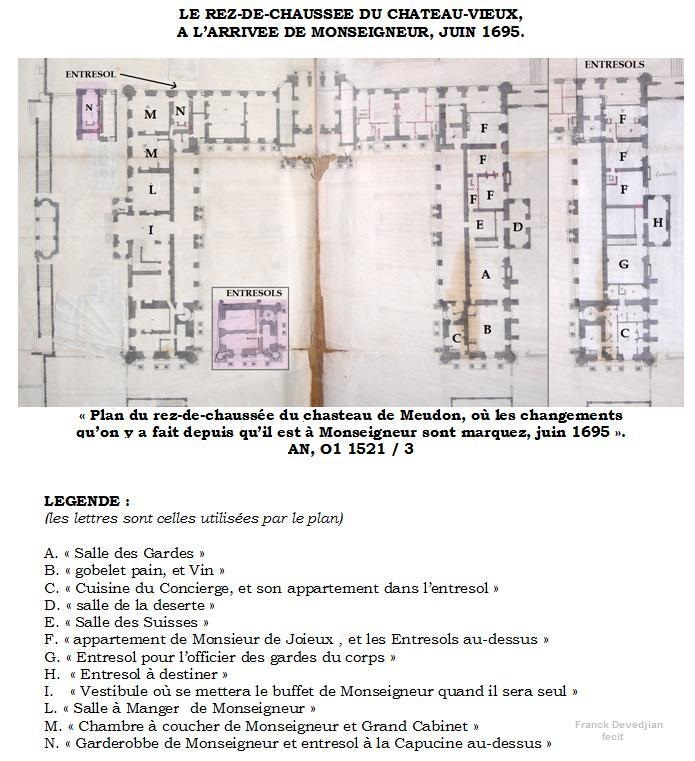
Layout of the ground floor of the Château-Vieux in 1695, at the arrival of Monseigneur.

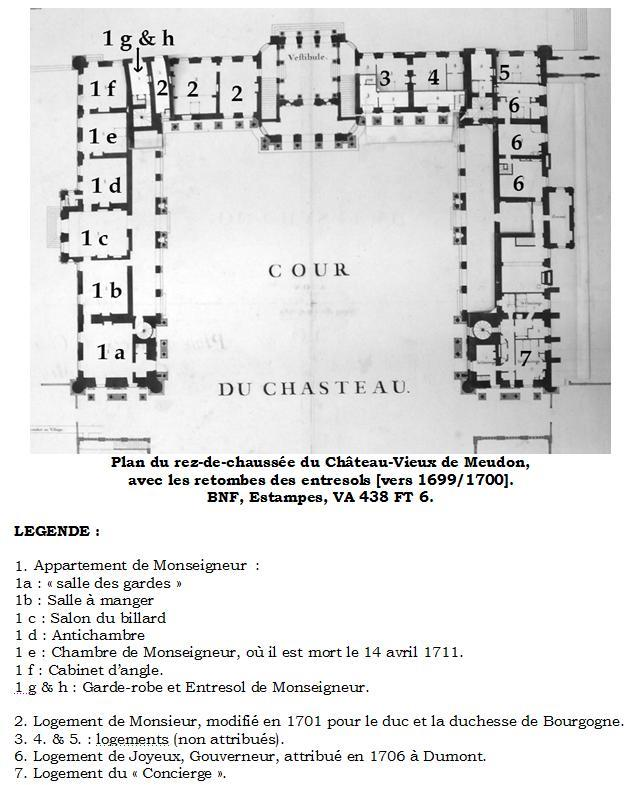
Layout of the ground floor of the Château-Vieux in 1700.

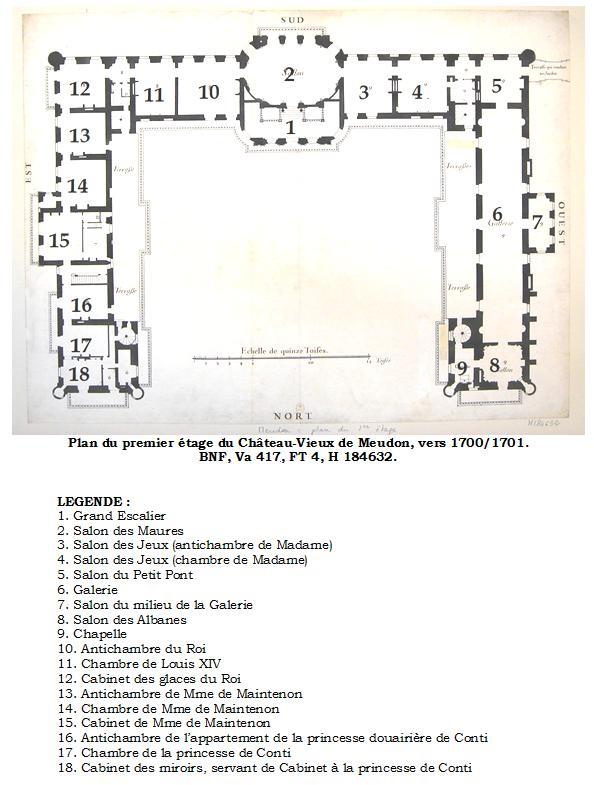
Layout of the first floor of the Château-Vieux in Meudon, 1700

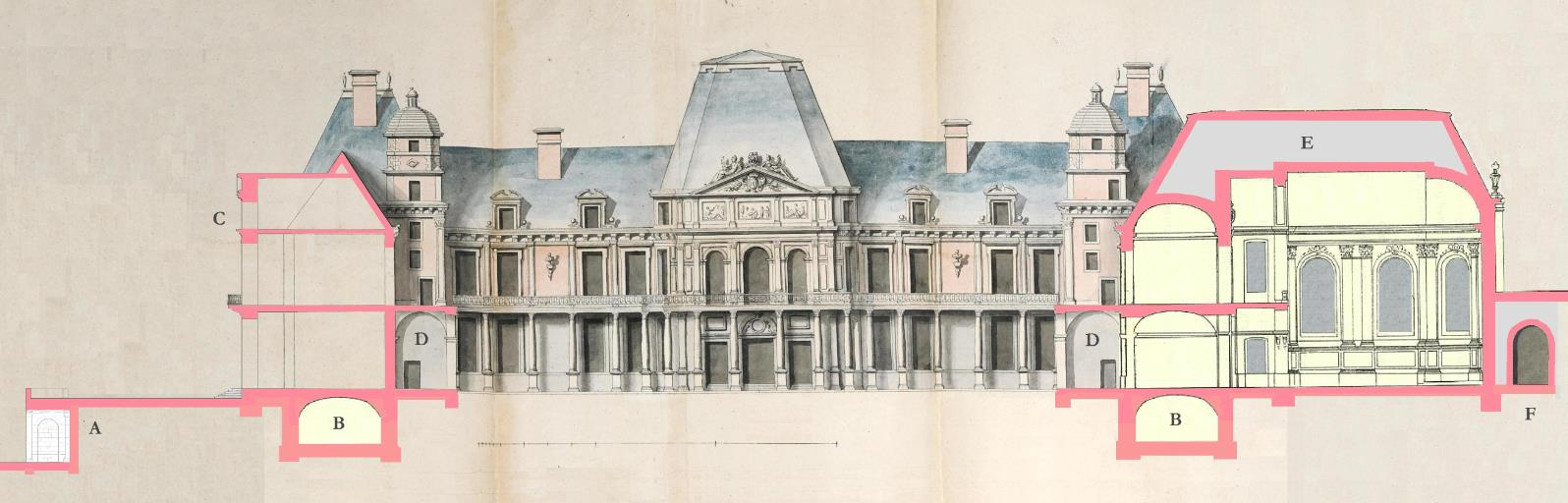
Cutaway of the Château-Vieux, with the chapel, after 1702. East-west axis, 2013

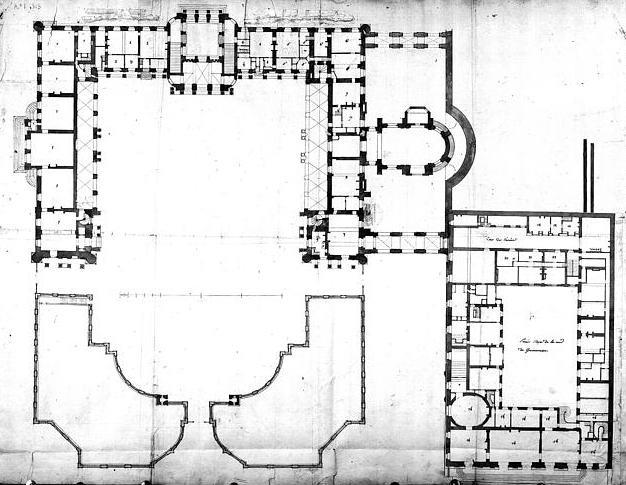
Diagram of the Château-Vieux and of the aile des marronniers (Chestnut tree wing) to the right. ADY

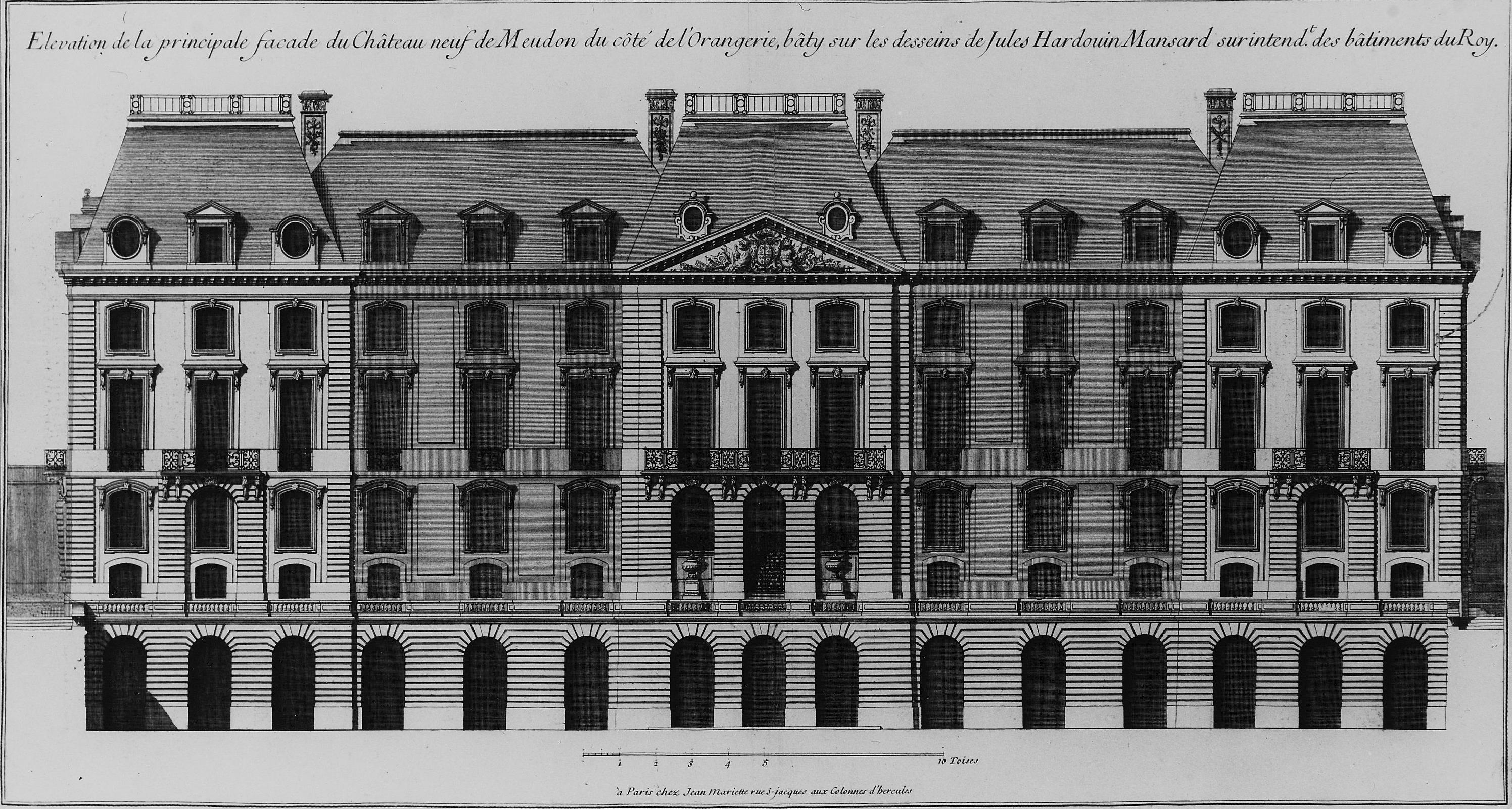
Château-Neuf on the side of the parterre. Mariette, around 1715.

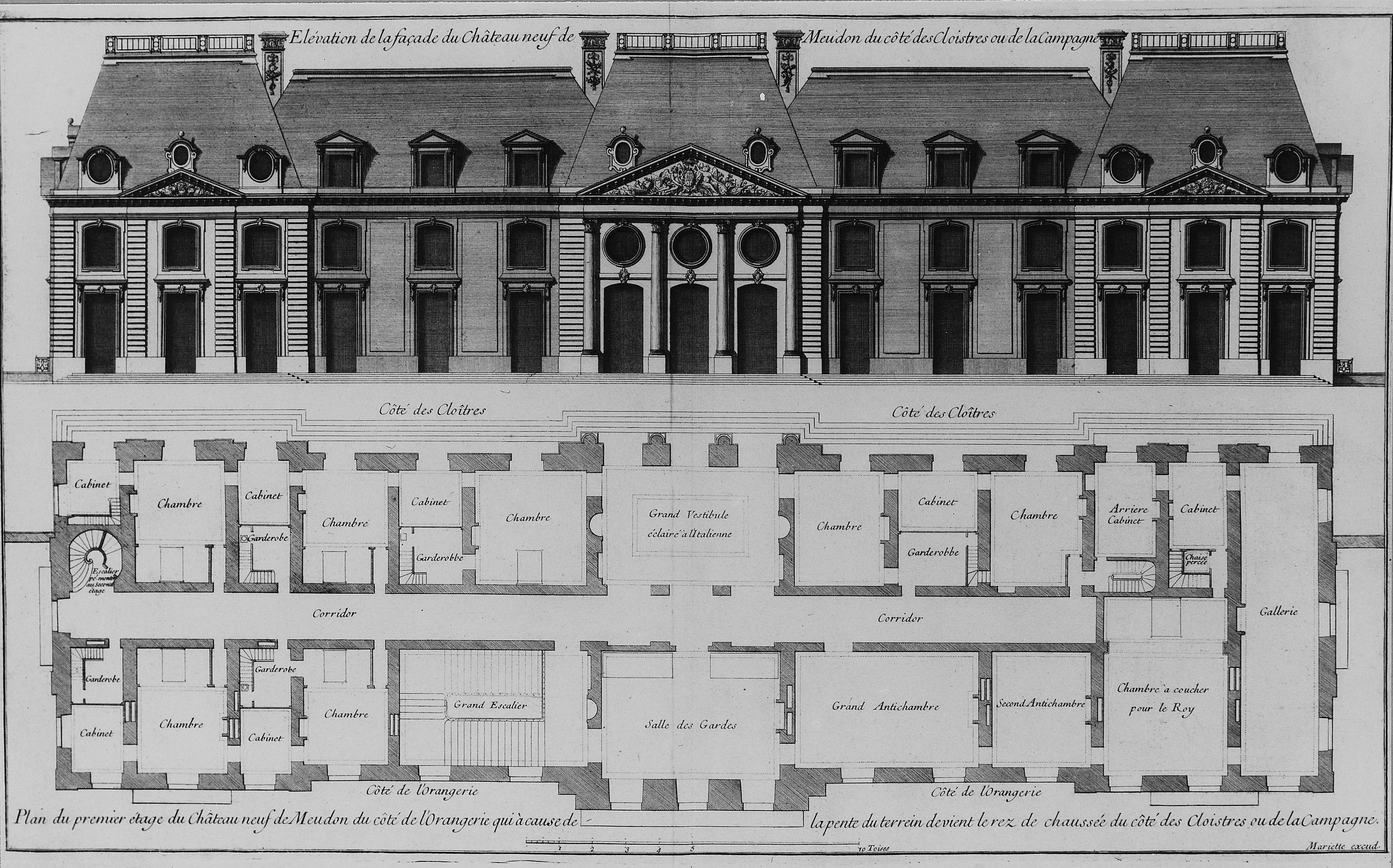
Diagram of the third level of the Château-Neuf (known as "le Bel étage", the beautiful floor), by Mariette, around 1715

==== Hanging gardens ====
The gardens were not to be outdone. The poem titled Maison royale de Meudon (Royal House of Meudon), dated 1703, even compared them to the Hanging Gardens of Babylon of Semiramis. To expand Meudon, the Dauphin in 1696 acquired the neighboring estate of Chaville. He thus formed a vast hunting preserve where he and his father, who also liked Meudon, practiced venery. The park of Meudon was thus linked to that of Versailles, and together they made up the Grand Parc de Versailles, extending from Meudon to Saint-Germain-en-Laye. Many embellishments were carried out in the gardens. Louis XIV took pleasure in advising his son on them. The King - or his son - even drew up a "Manière de montrer Meudon" a guide in the style of the texts written for Versailles.

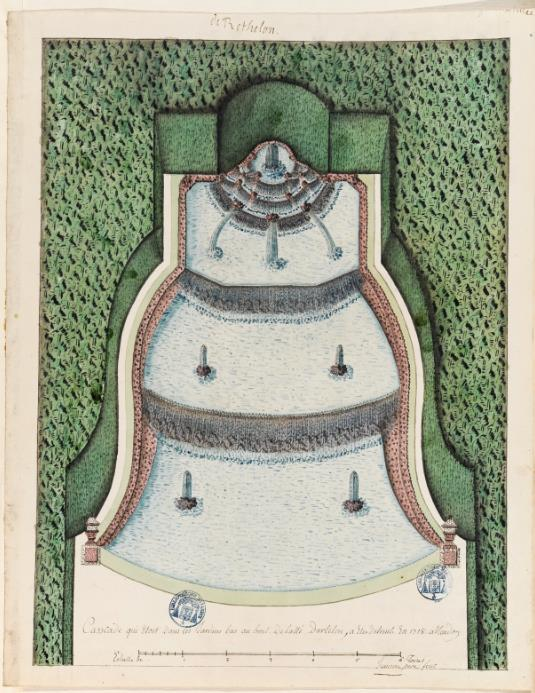
Arthelon waterfall, lower gardens of Meudon. ca. 1700

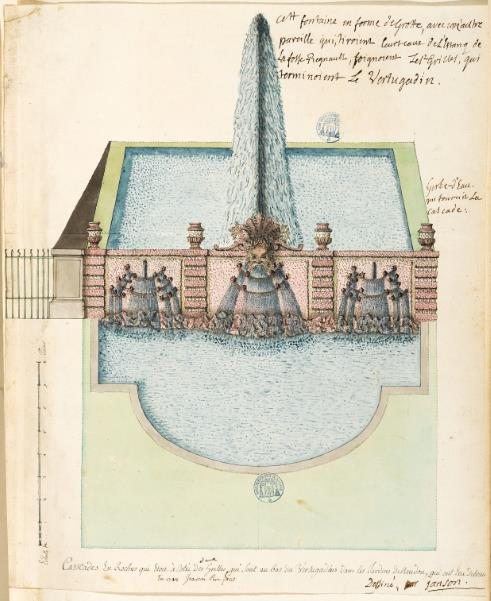
One of the two waterfalls framing the "pièce de M. Le Nostre" (piece by Monsieur Le Nostre)

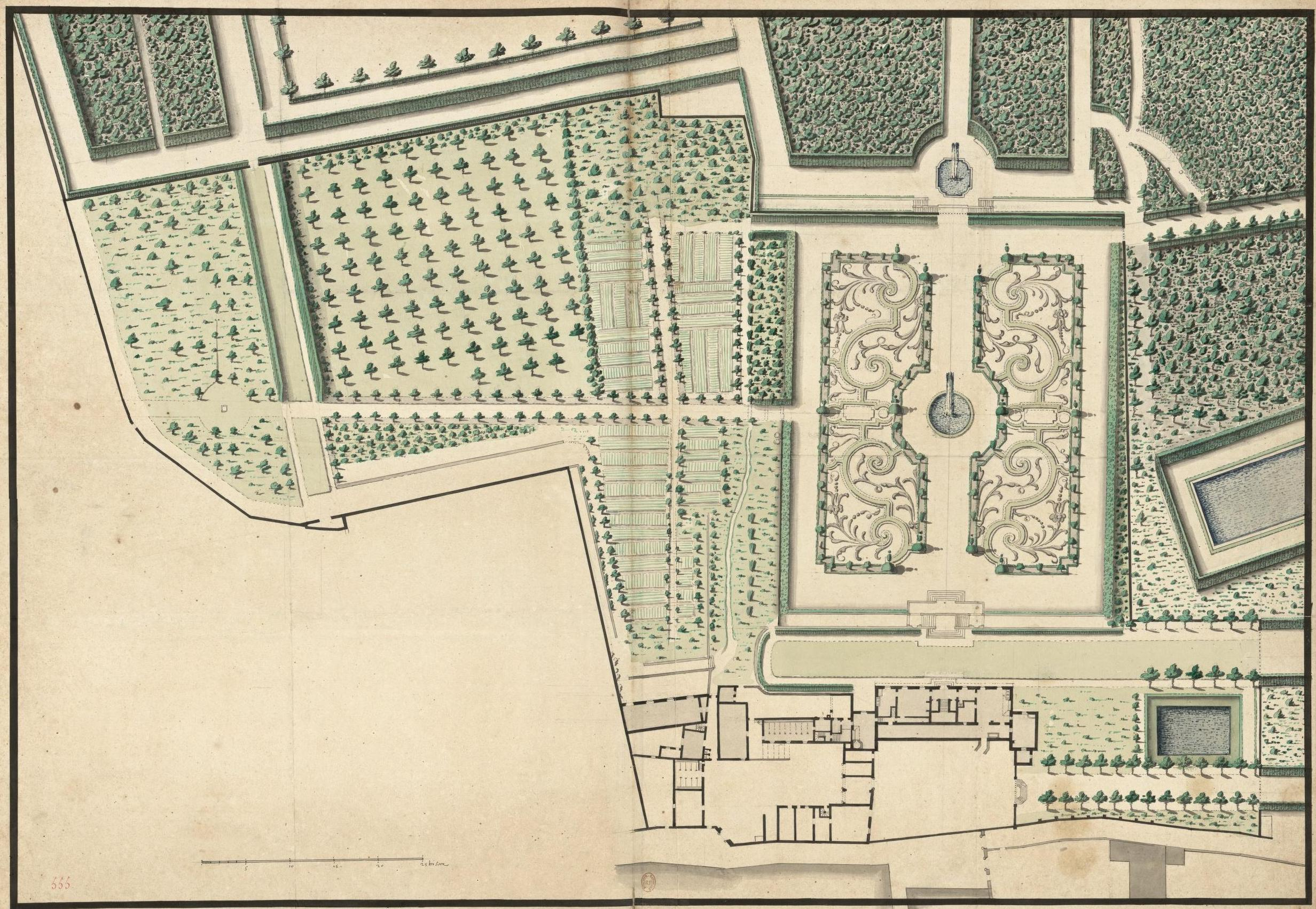
Plan for renovation of the parterre of the Hôtel Courtin, lower gardens of Meudon, c. 1710. BNF

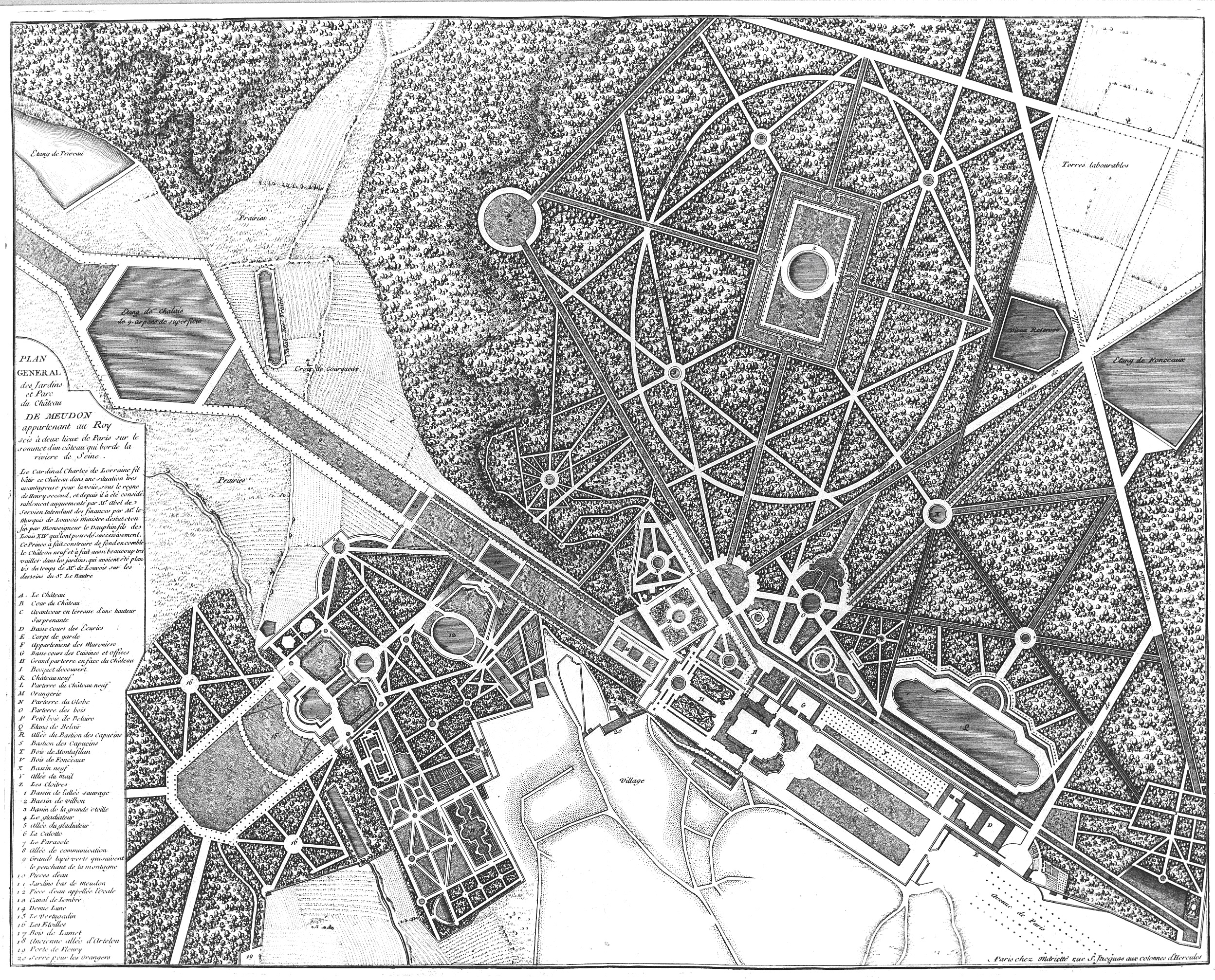
The park and the gardens of the château, Mariette, circa 1715

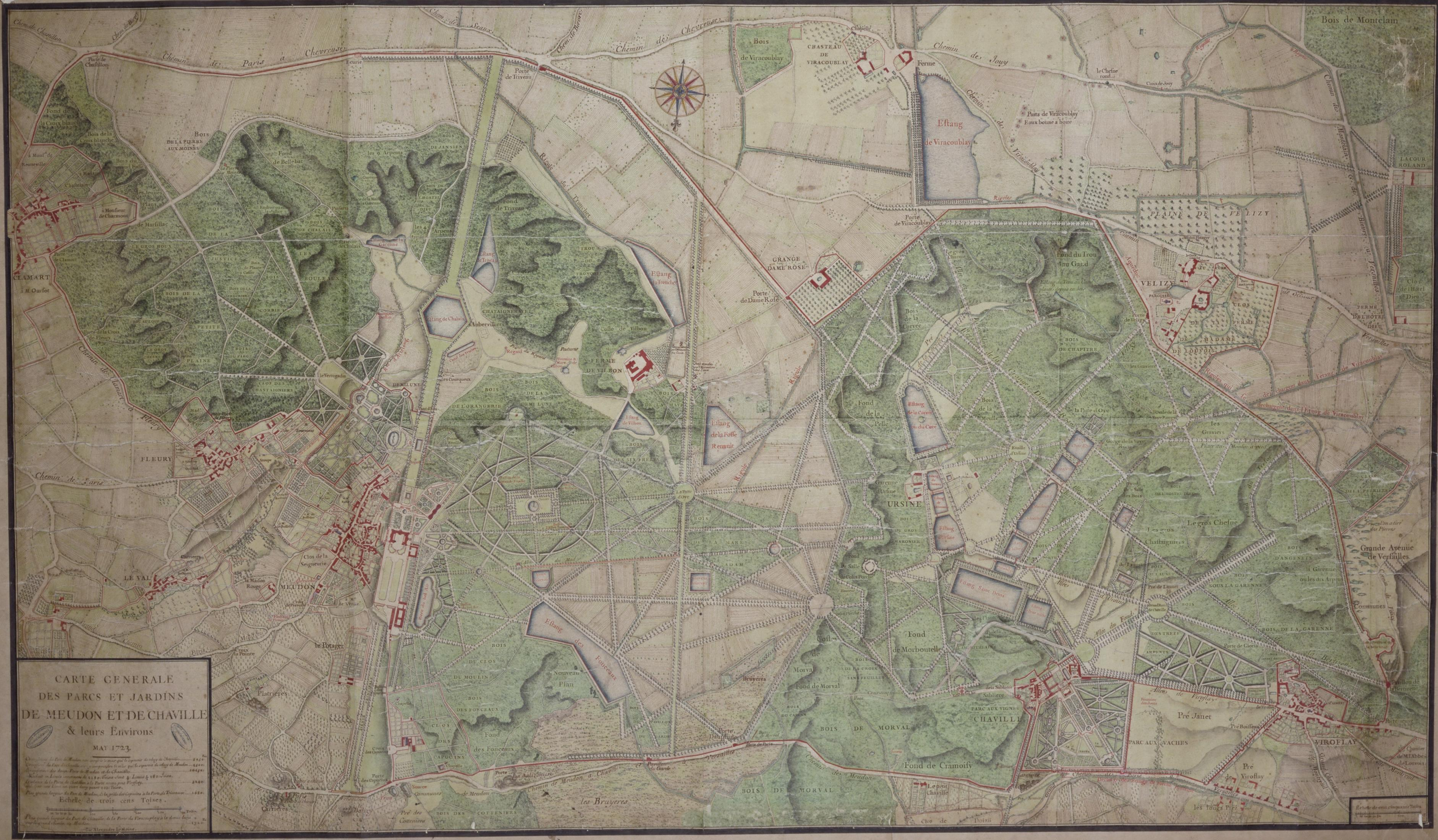
Overall map of the domains of Meudon and Chaville, by Alexandre Lemoine, ADY. 1723

=== 18th century ===
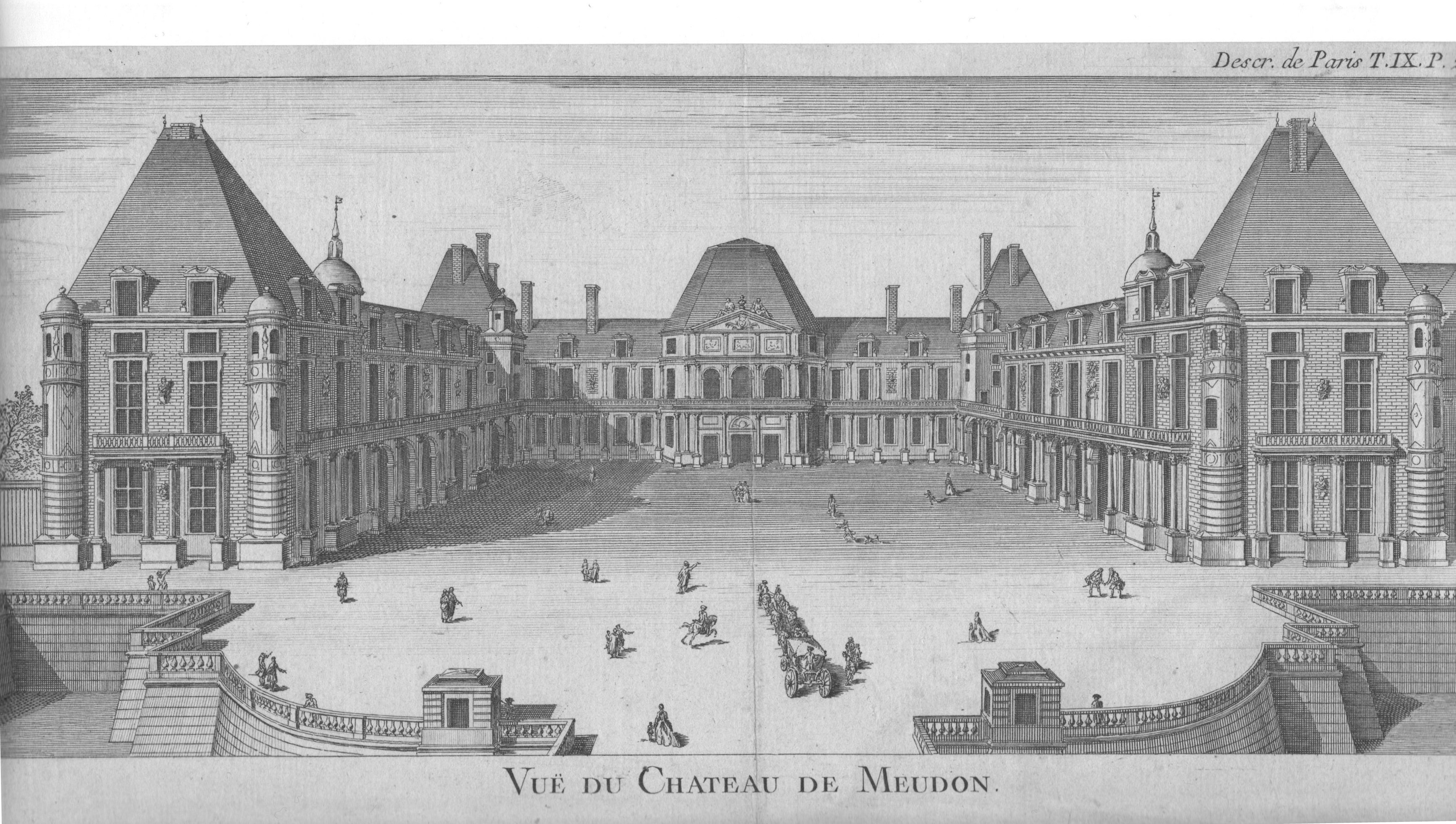
The cour d'honneur of the Château-Vieux at Meudon in the 18th century

At the death of the Dauphin in 1711, the castle was still perfectly maintained, since the Bâtiments du Roi (King's Buildings) administered it. Nevertheless, until the death of Louis XIV, no member of the royal family returned to Meudon, as a result of the remarks made by Louis XIV the day after the death of Monseigneur his son, wishing that the new Dauphin, Louis, Duke of Burgundy, make no more trips to Meudon. The Marquis de Sourches on 17 April 1711 noted that "Meudon was completely emptied and that all the furnishings were taken to the King's furniture storehouse."

On 17 May 1717, the Tsar Peter the Great, accompanied by Prince Francis II Rákóczi and the Marshal de Tessé, visited Meudon and rode horses in the gardens.

On May 16, 1718, Madame de Ventadour organized a fireworks show for Louis XV, who visited Meudon two or three times a week all that summer. On the following June 6, a new fireworks display was mounted in honor of the King.

==== Duchess of Berry, daughter of the Regent (1718–1719) ====
Marie Louise Élisabeth d'Orléans, Duchess of Berry, eldest daughter of the Regent, Philippe II, Duke of Orléans, owned the Château d'Amboise and wanted to swap it for Meudon. She was then the first lady of the court of France, and both cousin and aunt to the young unmarried king. The Regent eventually agreed to the exchange effective 30 October 1718. The Duchess of Berry, who was then pregnant, gave the management of this new residence to her paramour, the Count of Riom, lieutenant of her guards. Riom took possession of the castle the next day, 31 October. But the governor in office, Hyacinthe de Gauréault Dumont nevertheless retained his salary. On 2 November 1718, the Duchess went to Meudon to choose her apartments. On 8 February and 24 March 1719, the Regent came to Meudon to have supper with his daughter, by then just about to give birth.

From April 12 to May 14, 1719, the duchess was convalescing at Meudon, hoping to recover from her harrowing delivery. She died on July 21, 1719, at her Château de la Muette in Paris, to which she had travelled from Meudon. On 22 July 1719, a few hours after her death, seals were affixed to her properties: the Palace of Luxembourg and her castles of La Muette and Meudon.

==== Saint-Simon (1719–1722) ====
After the death of his daughter, the Regent made Meudon available to Saint-Simon one of his principal advisers, a considerable honor. Thus, the famous memorialist could stay close to Saint-Cloud, the Regent's family castle. On the night of June 15–16, 1722, the marriage of the daughter of Saint-Simon, Charlotte of Saint-Simon, to the Prince de Chimay, was celebrated at the chateau. The blessing was given by the Abbé Jean-Baptiste Languet de Gergy, the parish priest of Saint-Sulpice.

==== Louis XV and his children ====
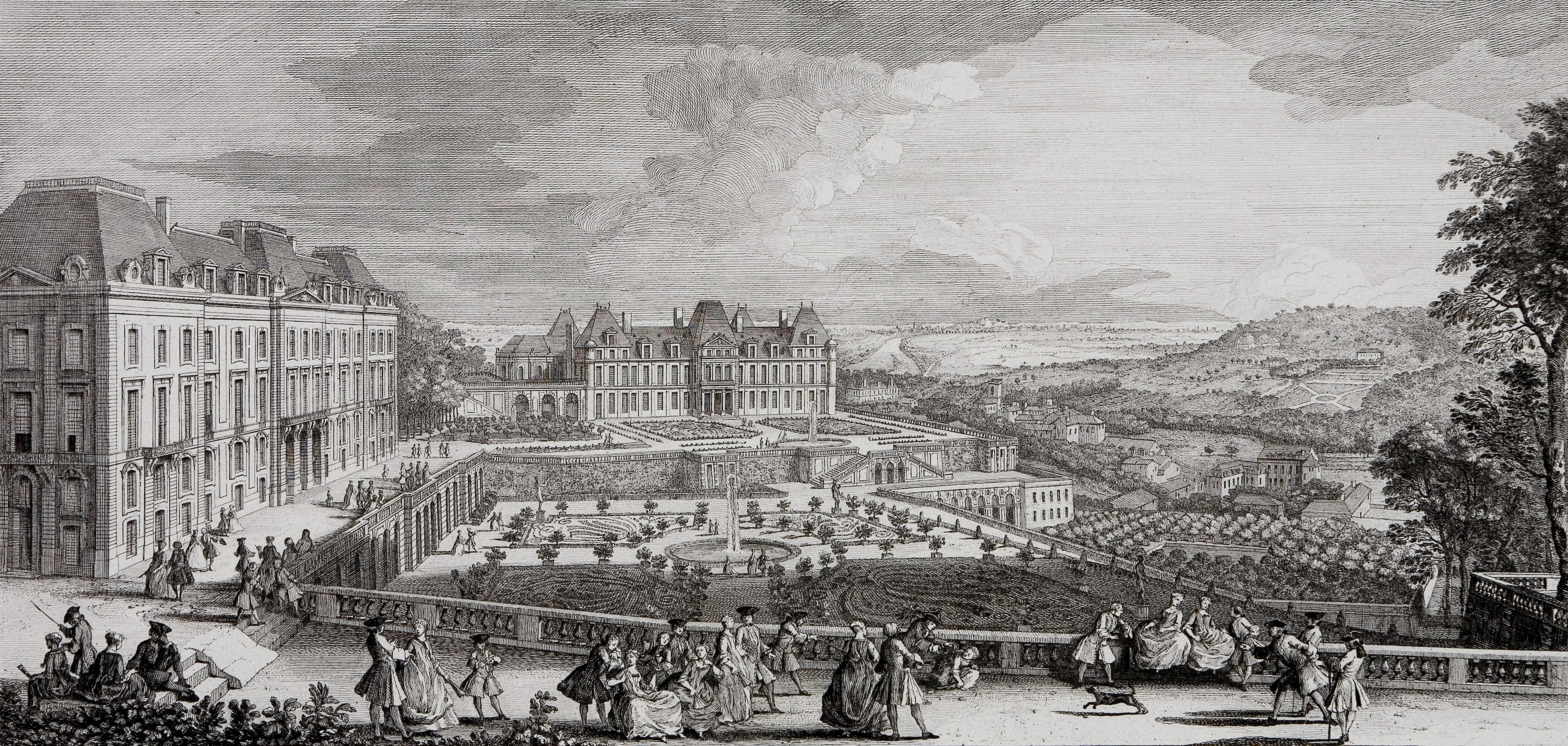
View of the château of Meudon on the parterre side. Engraving by Jacques Rigaud, c. 1730.

On 27 September 1722, at the request of the young king, the Maréchal de Villars came to Meudon voir le fortin construit pour Louis XV, qui « lui parla souvent de son fort et le mena à toutes les attaques ». Louis XV was the grandson of Monseigneur.

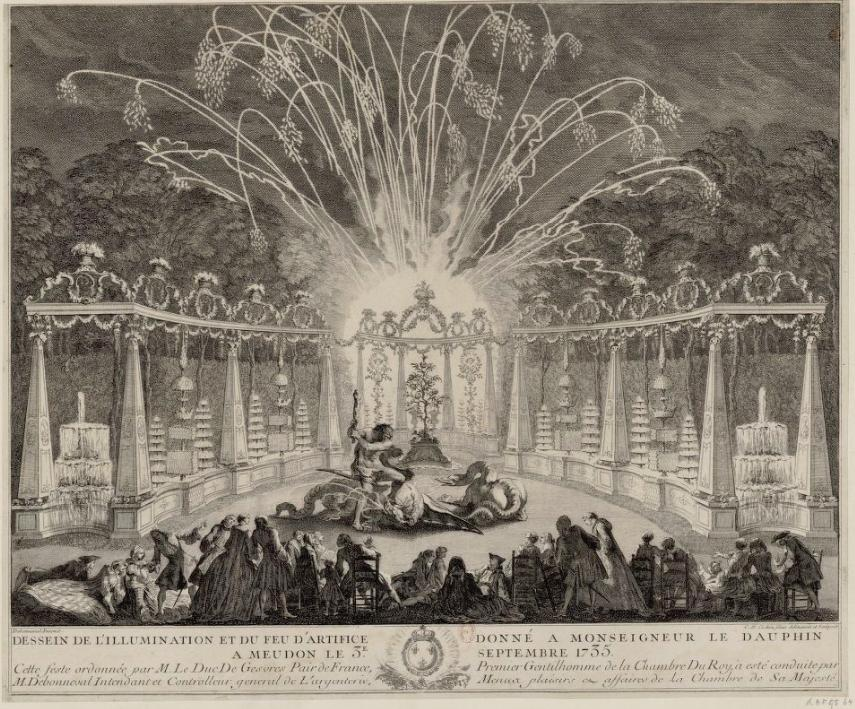
Fireworks for the Dauphin at Meudon 3 September 1735". BNF

On the 17 April 1723, the King went to Meudon, went through the apartments of the château, and gave orders for the stay of his Majesty. Indeed, from 4 June to 13 August 1723, Louis XV, the "Infanta Reine", the Regent and the Court settled in Meudon for a month, time enough to restore Versailles to house the young sovereigns. On August 10, Cardinal Guillaume Dubois died at Versailles. "As soon as he was dead, the Duke of Orléans returned to Meudon to inform the King of this news, who begged him to take charge of all the conduct of affairs, declared him prime minister, and was sworn in on the following day". Pierre-Denis Martin (1663–1742) painted for the King "A vision of Meudon in perspective that includes all the park and the castle, Monseigneur entering there."

On December 14, 1725, the new queen Marie Leszczynska, who married Louis XV on September 4, came to visit Meudon for the first time.

In September 1726, a royal edict brought together Meudon and the Crown Estate with the land that depended on it, with the exception of Chaville Castle and Park, and Castle and farm of Villacoublay. On this occasion, the arms of Louvois - azure, with three lizards of silver laid in pal, to the chief sewn gules charged with three gold stars - which were still on the central pediment - were erased.

In May 1733, at Versailles, a scene was set up between Louis XV and the governor of the castle of Meudon: Marquis de Pellevé,

"Stay of the Children of France in Meudon in 1733.

The sojourn of the Fils de France at Meudon was decided at the beginning of May, 1733, in an assembly of doctors held in Versailles, with regard to their health, the death of Madame and the Duke of Anjou having frightened the others.

Their journey was subsequently scheduled for the 21st of the same month and a few days before de Pellevé, speaking of their stay with Cardinal Fleury, told him that it would cause him some expense, and that he was persuaded that his Eminence wished to treat him like his predecessor Hyacinthe de Gauréault Dumont had been, while the King remained there, and to grant him the same gratification.

The cardinal replied that the king's affairs were not in a position to make such graces, which did not prevent him from taking the time that the cardinal was with the king to speak to him in the presence of His Majesty and His Eminence told him the same thing.

He did not confine himself to these two rejections, he made the same request on the 21st, at the time when his Majesty was speaking to the duke of Charot. The King replied that the matter was decided, which obliged him to cease. Only for a few moments: for he again returned to the charge, and represented to the King, interrupting a second time, the expense which he would be obliged to make, and the injustice which was done to him. The King then told the captain of his guards to take him out of the room. It was ordered to the officer of the guards who commanded Meudon not to let him enter the chamber of the Dauphin or the ladies".

==== Queen's parents: the visit of Stanislas Leszczyński (1736–1737) ====
On 4 June 1736, Stanislas Leszczyński, after abdicating in April, temporarily settled at Meudon. According to the Duke of Luynes, "S. M. [Sa Majesté Louis XV] goes there at least once a week since the king and queen of Poland live there." On 30 September 1736, King Stanislas secretly signed the Declaration of Meudon under pressure from Louis XV and Cardinal Fleury. According to the terms of the agreement, possession of the Duchy of Lorraine and Duchy of Bar would be "current" for the former Polish king and "possible" for Louis XV. On 18 January 1737, Leszczyński handed the seals to the new Chancellor, who swore an oath to the King of Poland. The ceremony took place in the large vestibule of the Château Vieux, on the ground floor of the central pavilion. The painting by François-André Vincent of this ceremony, is from much later, since it dates only from 1778. On 31 March 1737, "the king went today to Meudon bid farewell to the king and queen of Poland" (Duke of Luynes). They left Meudon the next day, 1 April. The two castles were then stripped of their furnishings.

In the summer of 1743, facing the threat of Prince Charles Alexander of Lorraine, Queen Catherine of Poland, wife of Stanislas and mother of the French queen, took refuge in Meudon. Stanislas took refuge in Metz.

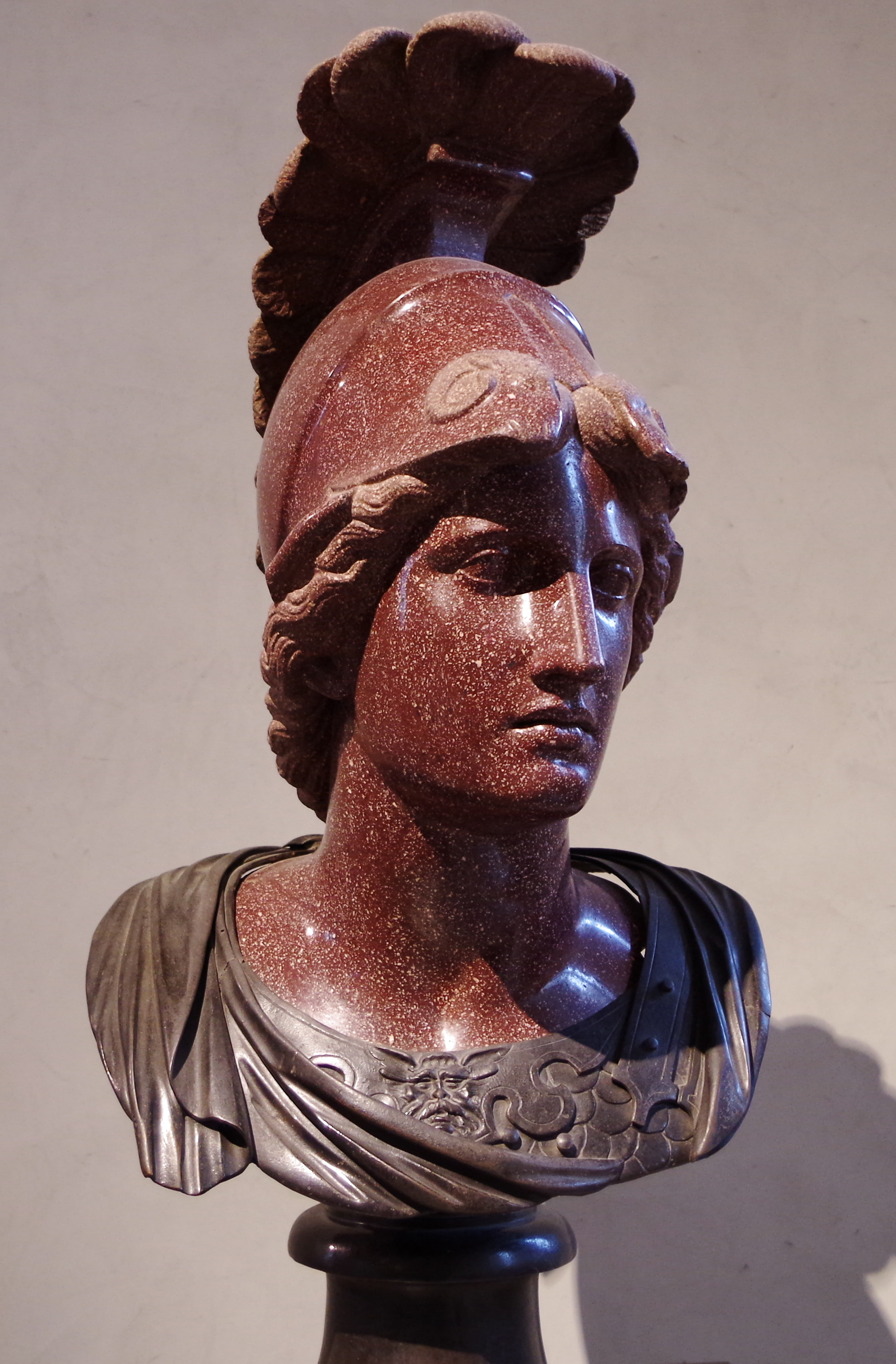
17th century Italian statue, of the Athena Giustiniani type, known as '"Alexandre Mazarin". Musée du Louvre. Displayed in 18th century in the Salon du Petit Pont, at one end of the gallery

The Knight of Fréjus visited Meudon on 5 May 1748. He left the following description:

On the 5th of May 1748, the first Sunday of the month, I went to Meudon by galiot. We went up to Sèvres and from Sèvres we went upriver to the Capuchin monastery at Meudon, where we heard mass. The church there is not unusual, but their garden is very beautiful. From there we ascended the terrace of Meudon to the château, which is situated on a mountain from which all of Paris and the surrounding villages can be viewed. All the hills around Meudon are planted in vineyards and well maintained. The castle is superb. I noticed on the main entrance the arms of Louvois, and below the image of Louis XIV in metal. A gallery reigns in beauty outside the windows of this castle, as well as a facade on the side of the garden, charming... I saw two chambers lined in Gobelins tapestry of admirable beauty.

Most rooms are covered in mirrors. The gallery leading to the chapel is superb. I saw there a very fine picture of the siege of Mannheim under Louis XIV, and a bust of Alexander of porphyry which is inestimable. Another, of Aristotle in Egyptian marble, is seen as a masterpiece. The chapel of the castle is very agreeable, with a single nave. There is only one altar, whose painting represents the resurrection of our Lord Jesus Christ, but it is one of the most beautiful pictures that can be seen, and is said to be of Raphael by Antoine Coypel. From the castle we were led to see the new apartment [the Château-Neuf] It is very lovely and very agreeable, but less handsome than the first. From the castles to the village which is at the foot of the mountain, one sees only parterres and gardens of a charming cleanliness and arrangement. We saw the orangeries, the greenhouses. They are far from being as beautiful as those of Versailles. From there we ascended by a superb staircase to the top of the mountain, where you find the most beautiful alleys of trees, with beautiful pools of water. Going through the woods on the side of Sèvres, you find a basin of prodigious expanse, at the top of the mountain, beside a green meadow with a very gracious view. The alleys and gardens of Meudon have no beautiful statues as at the park at Versailles. The castles themselves do not approach the richness of that of Versailles but the location of Meudon...provides a beautiful view...The stables there are not beautiful. After seeing all that there was to see, we were dined at Meudon in the village... For dinner for three, including me, I paid three livres... [I] have not eaten elsewhere pigeons so fat (...)

==== Château de Bellevue preferred after 1750 ====
As an adult, Louis XV preferred the Château de Bellevue that he had built for Madame de Pompadour. The castle was used to accommodate courtiers, and the castle stables served Bellevue, whose stables were very small.

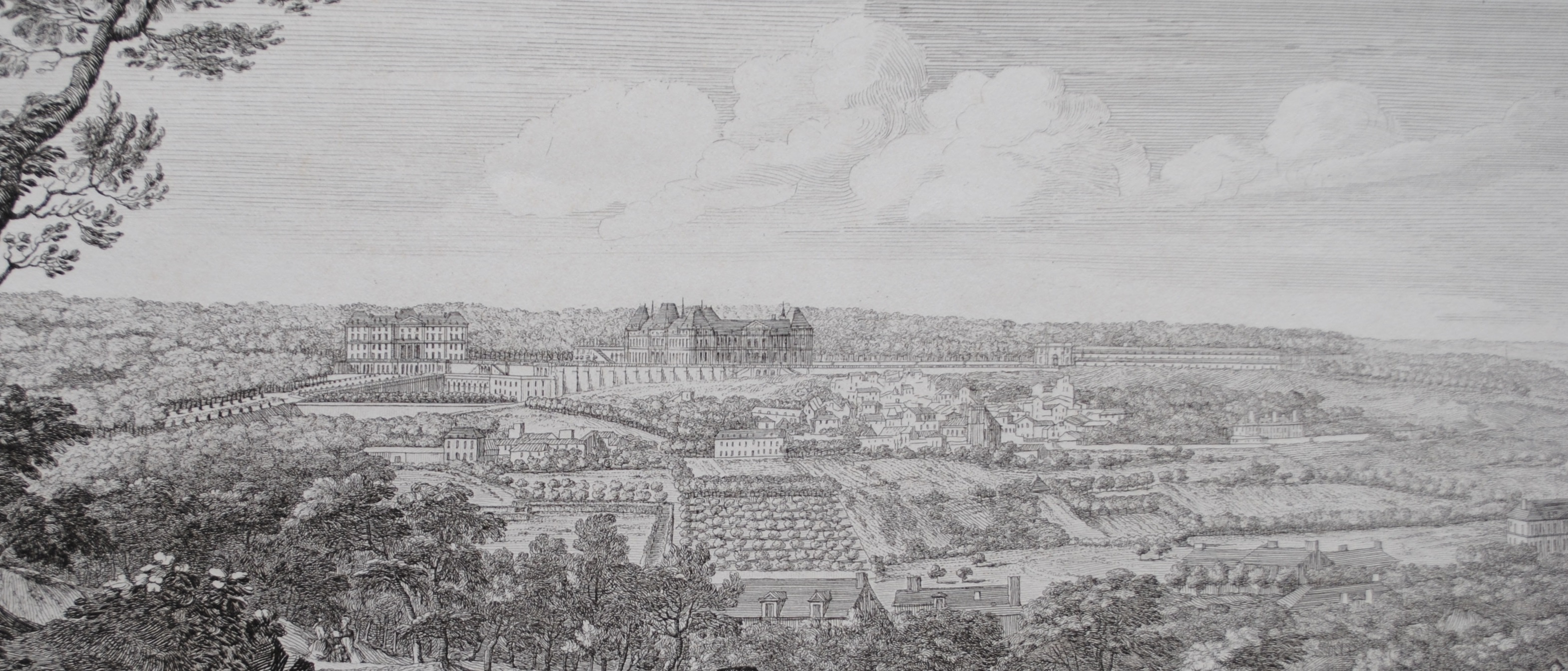
View of Meudon from Fleury. Jacques Rigaud, ca. 1730-40

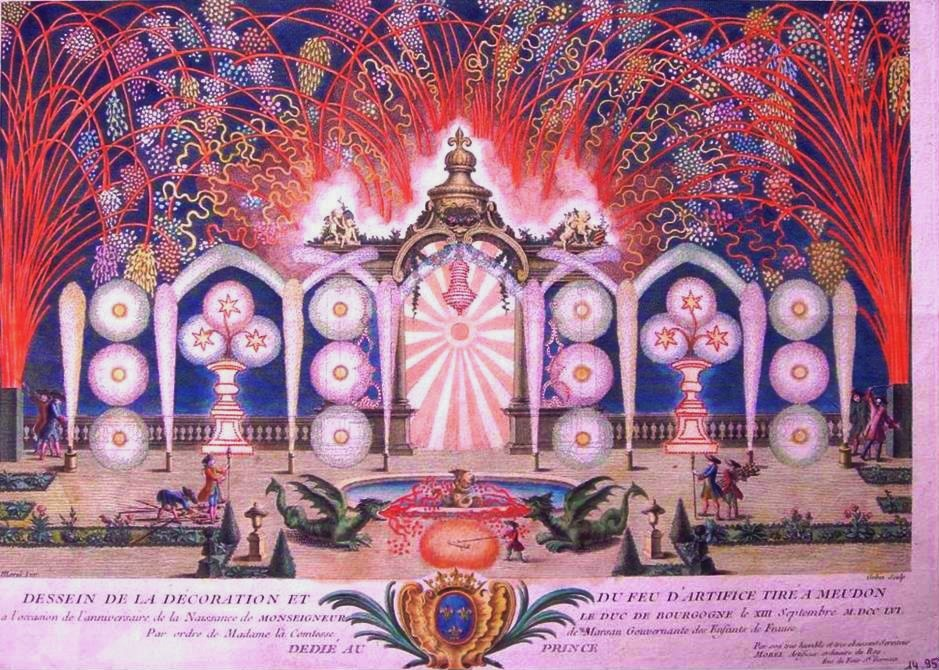
"Dessein de la décoration et du feu d'artifice tiré à Meudon" (Drawing of decorations and fireworks at Meudon) in honor of the Duke of Burgundy, 13 September 1756. AD 92.

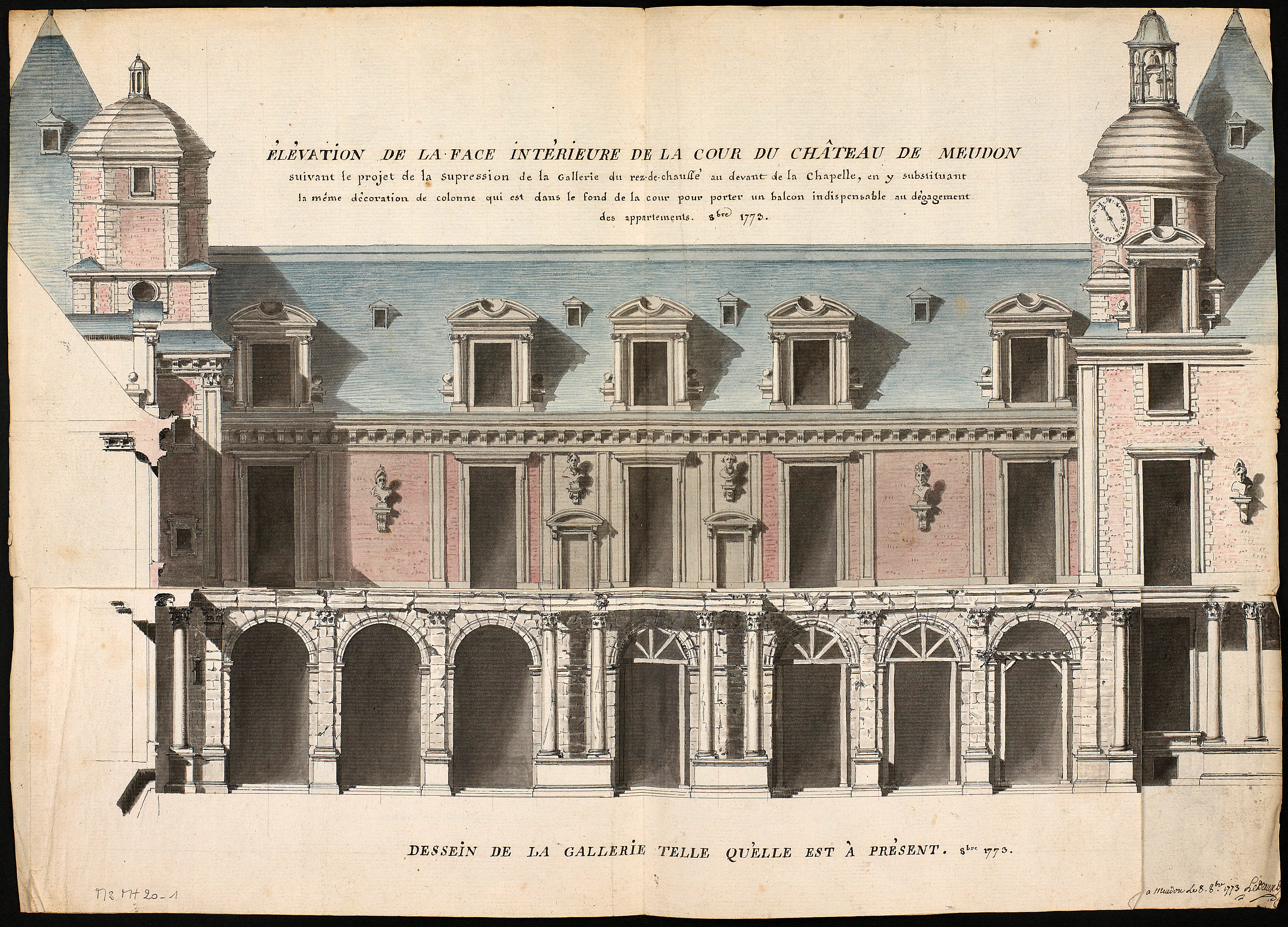
West wing of the Château-Vieux de Meudon, 1773. Drawing by architect Louis Le Dreux de La Châtre

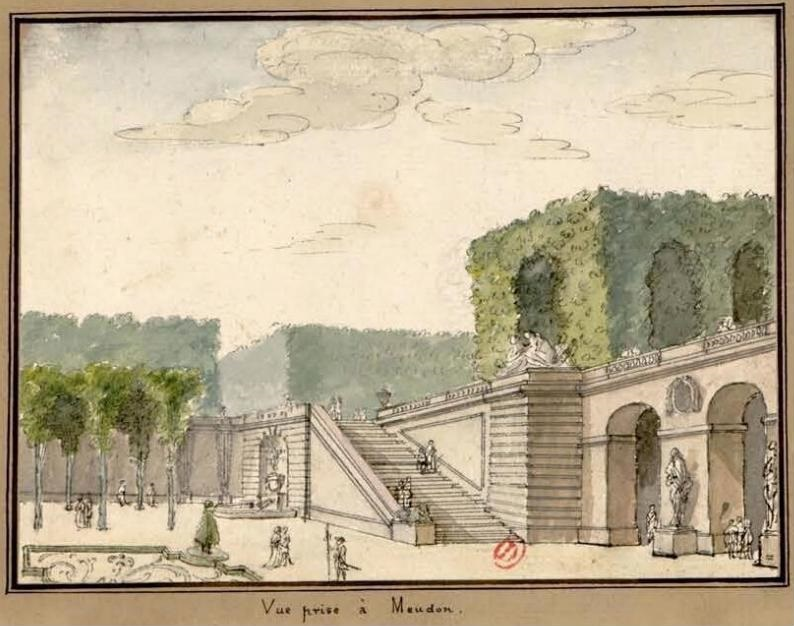
"Vue prise à Meudon" (View from Meudon): the stair of the Petit Pont. Late 18th century by Thiery de Sainte-Colombe, INHA

==== Louis XVI and Marie-Antoinette in Meudon ====
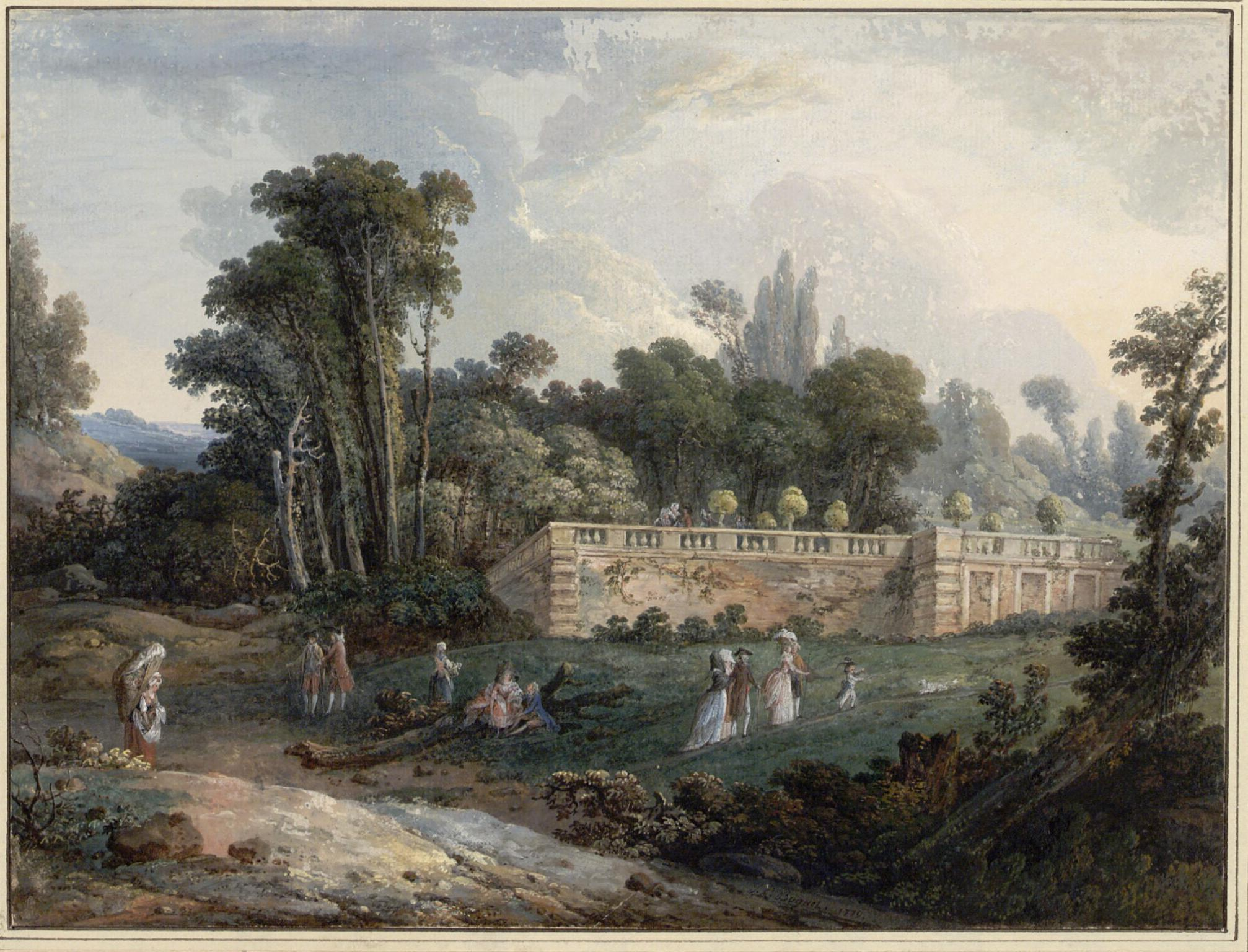
View of the parterre du Globe at Meudon in 1779. Jean Pierre Bocquet (Paris 1751 - Paris 1817). Albertina Museum, inv. 12591. Gouache, 22 x 29 cm

The new young king often liked to come and hunt in Meudon. One year after his accession, the architect Louis Le Dreux de la Châtre drew up an inventory dated October 10, 1775, which enumerates the "mirrors, marbles, paintings and other effects belonging to the King" in the castle. In the margin are drawn overall diagrams of all the mirrors.

An edict of the King, in May 1778, united the domain of Meudon to that of Versailles, "to be governed and administered in the future in the same manner."

Louis XVI himself designed a pavilion called the "Trivaux Pavilion" in 1783, in an Anglo-Chinese style, which was finally correctedin a more French style by the architect Jean-François Heurtier. This pavilion was situated at the very top of the green carpet of Meudon, towards Meudon-la-Forêt. At Meudon Louis XVI and his wife Marie Antoinette lost little Louis Joseph, Dauphin of France, who died on June 4, 1789, a month before the storming of the Bastille.

In 1791, the castle still served as a holiday home for the new Dauphin, as represented by a watercolor by Jean-Baptiste Isabey.

In his "Journal," on June 8, 1788, Marquis de Bombelles described Meudon:

"I accompanied the ladies to the ambassadors at the chateau de Meudon. The new castle, where we dined at the house of the Duke of Harcourt, was built by Monseigneur for Marie Émilie de Joly de Choin, his mistress. This castle is in a proportion which would render it suitable to every nobleman in a position to spend from 2 to 300,000 livres a year. It is not the same with the old castle. This palace, which M. de Louvois had enlarged, embellished with a magnificence as indecent as it is incredible, would still very easily be a truly royal residence. All the ceilings are painted in arabesque, as if the reigning taste had presided over their order. The cornices, the chimneys, the parquets of superb woodwork, nothing would need to be modernized. There is, in a turret, a cabinet painted also in arabesque on a background of gold, which is as fresh of paint as if it came from the hands of one of our best artists. It is a question of making this beautiful castle the home of all the summers, if we do not feel the sorrow of losing this prince."

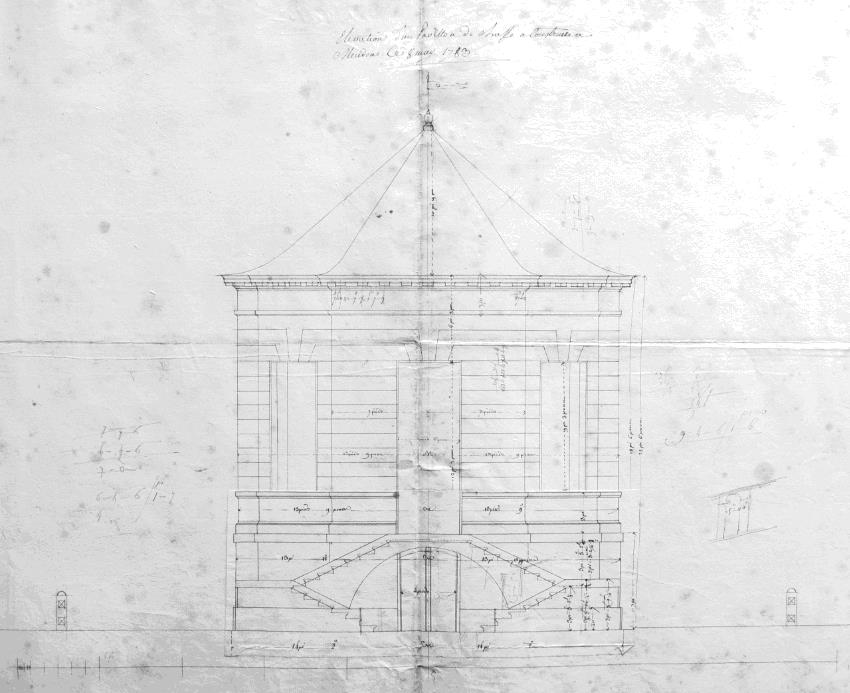
Pavillon de Trivaux, 1783

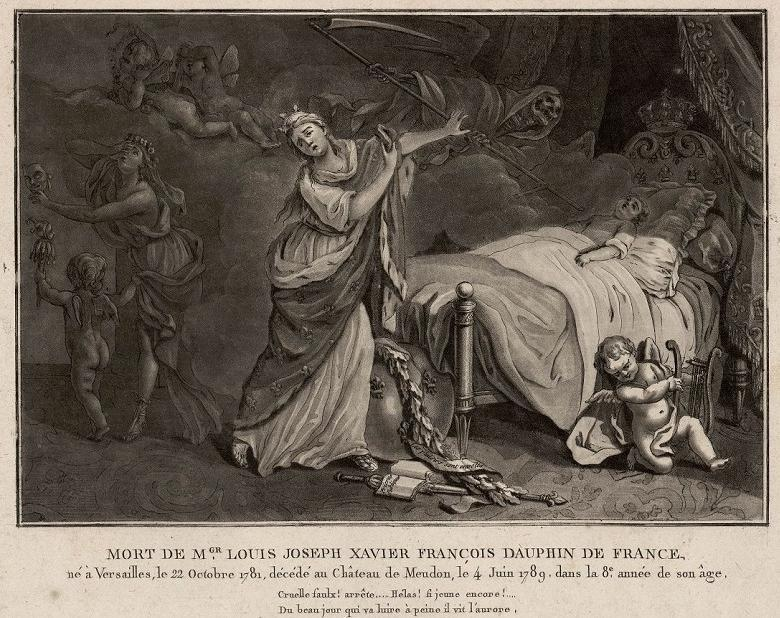
Death of the Dauphin in Meudon, 4 June 1789

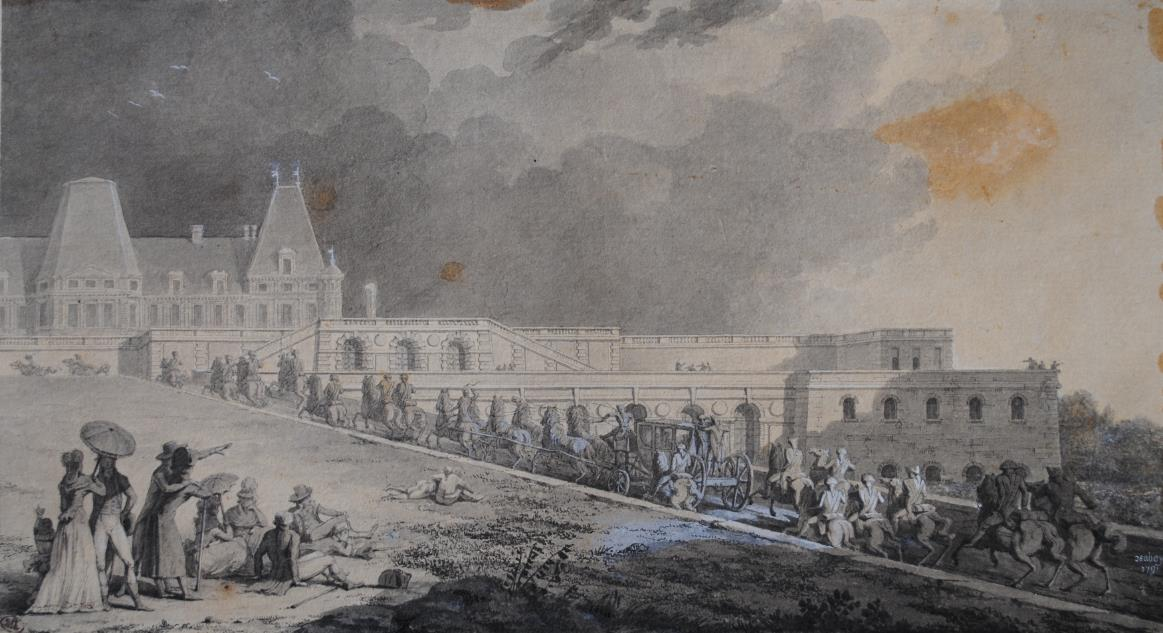
Retour de la promenade de Mr le Dauphin (Louis XVII) at the vieux château in Meudon, Jean-Baptiste Isabey, 1791. Musée du Louvre

=== 19th century: between pomp and decline ===
After 10 August 1792, the fate of the castle became uncertain. The National Convention quickly took care to remove most of the over-the-door paintings, and carefully disassembled and transferred them to provincial museums, which saved them from destruction.

==== "Castle of the Republic" (1793–1795) ====
On November 4, 1793, Pierre Choderlos de Laclos, appointed chief commissioner of experiments at Meudon, took possession on behalf of the Minister of Marine, where he had suggested setting up artillery and ammunition tests

But Choderlos de Laclos was arrested the next day. The site was transformed by the Convention into a national facility for various tests. It served as a factory for aerostats and became the "castle of the Republic", which served as a place for weapons experimentation to arm the new regime.

Nicolas-Jacques Conté was, together with several other scientists, in charge of these military and scientific experiments at Meudon, where he was given direction of the aerostation school established there. Conté had under his orders a confused gathering of young men in all professions, without any dye of chemistry, drawing, or mathematics, who were called upon to create an entirely new technique. Conté had to approach the elements of the different sciences, for this new teaching had to embrace everything: chemistry, physics, mechanics. Conté, by giving both theoretical and practical lessons, Conté had the models he gave, the instruments he imagined, executed by the hands of his pupils, spending his nights preparing drawings for his lessons,

Military aérostats at the château in Meudon. Watercolors on paper by Nicolas-Jacques Conté

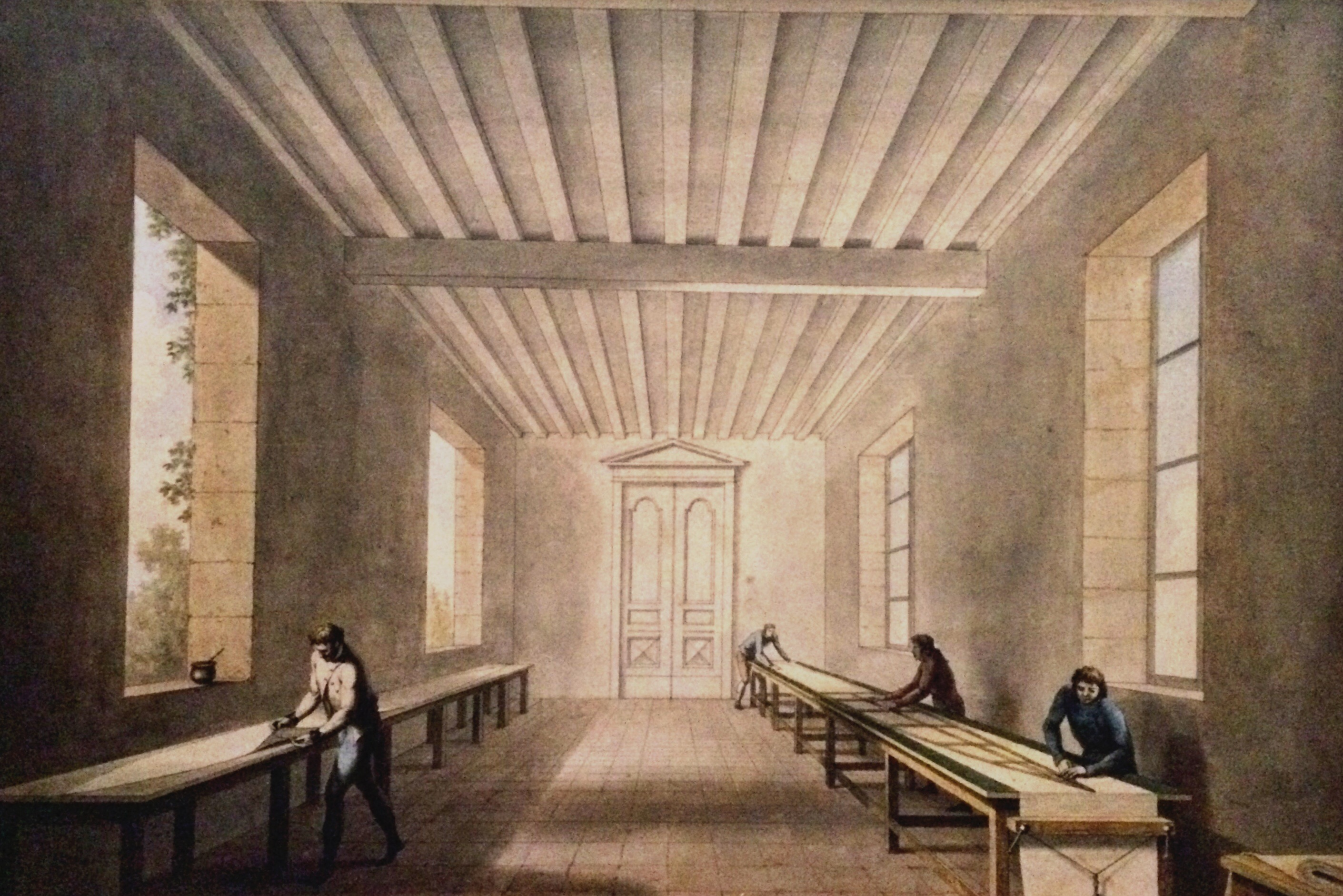
Découpage des toiles pour composer des fuseaux (1/5)

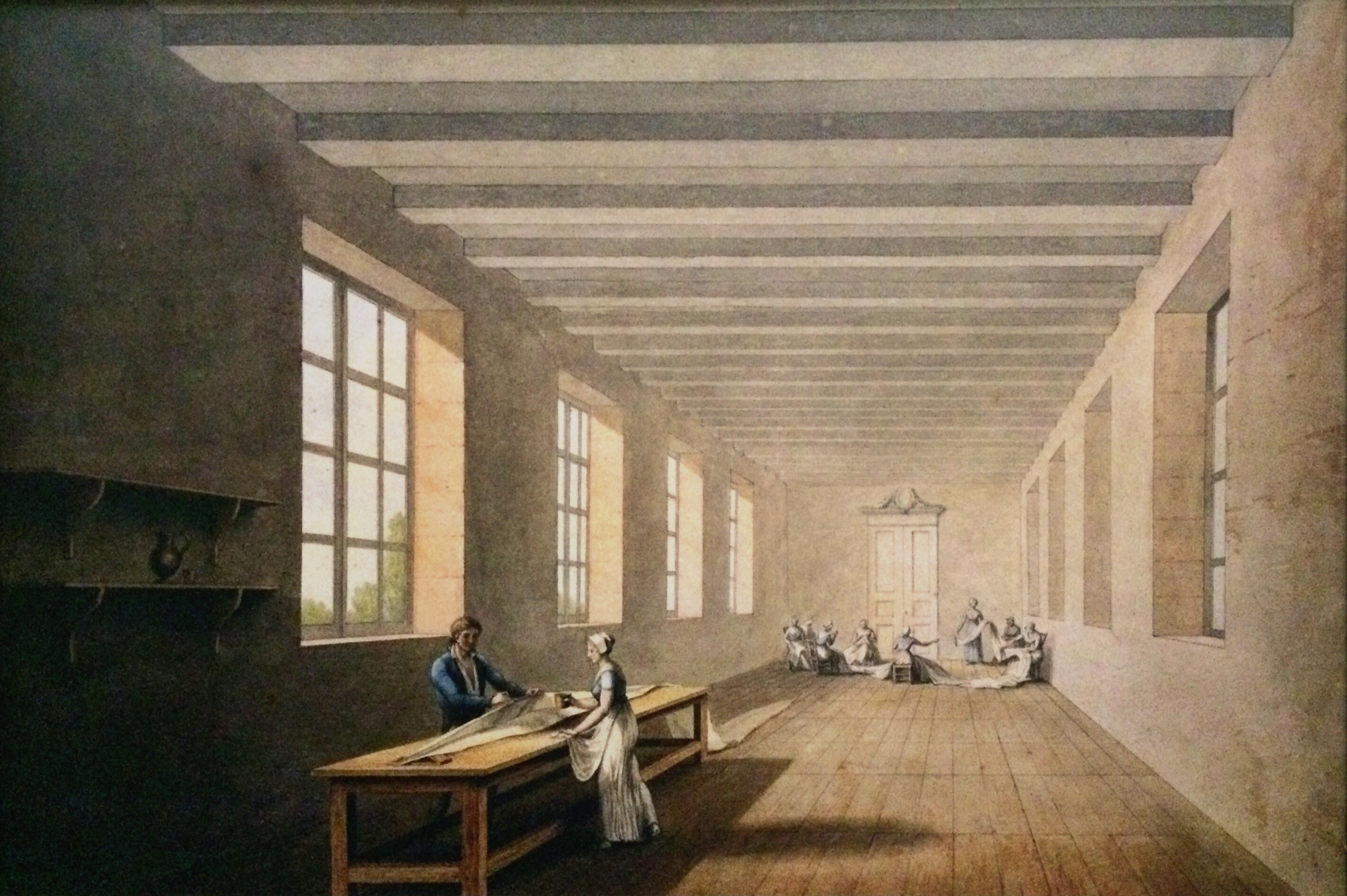
Assemblage des fuseaux (2/5)

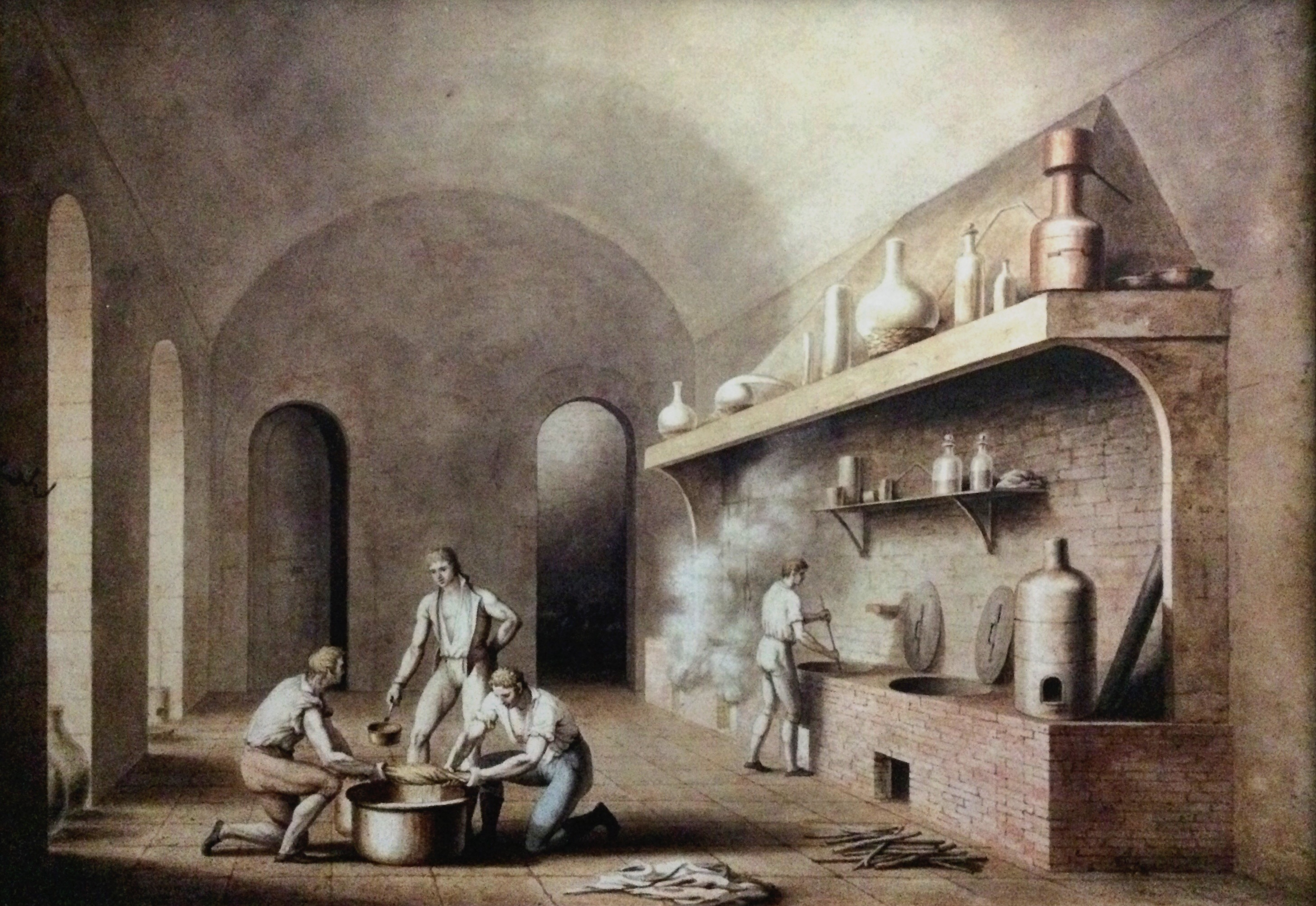
Préparation du vernis (3/5)

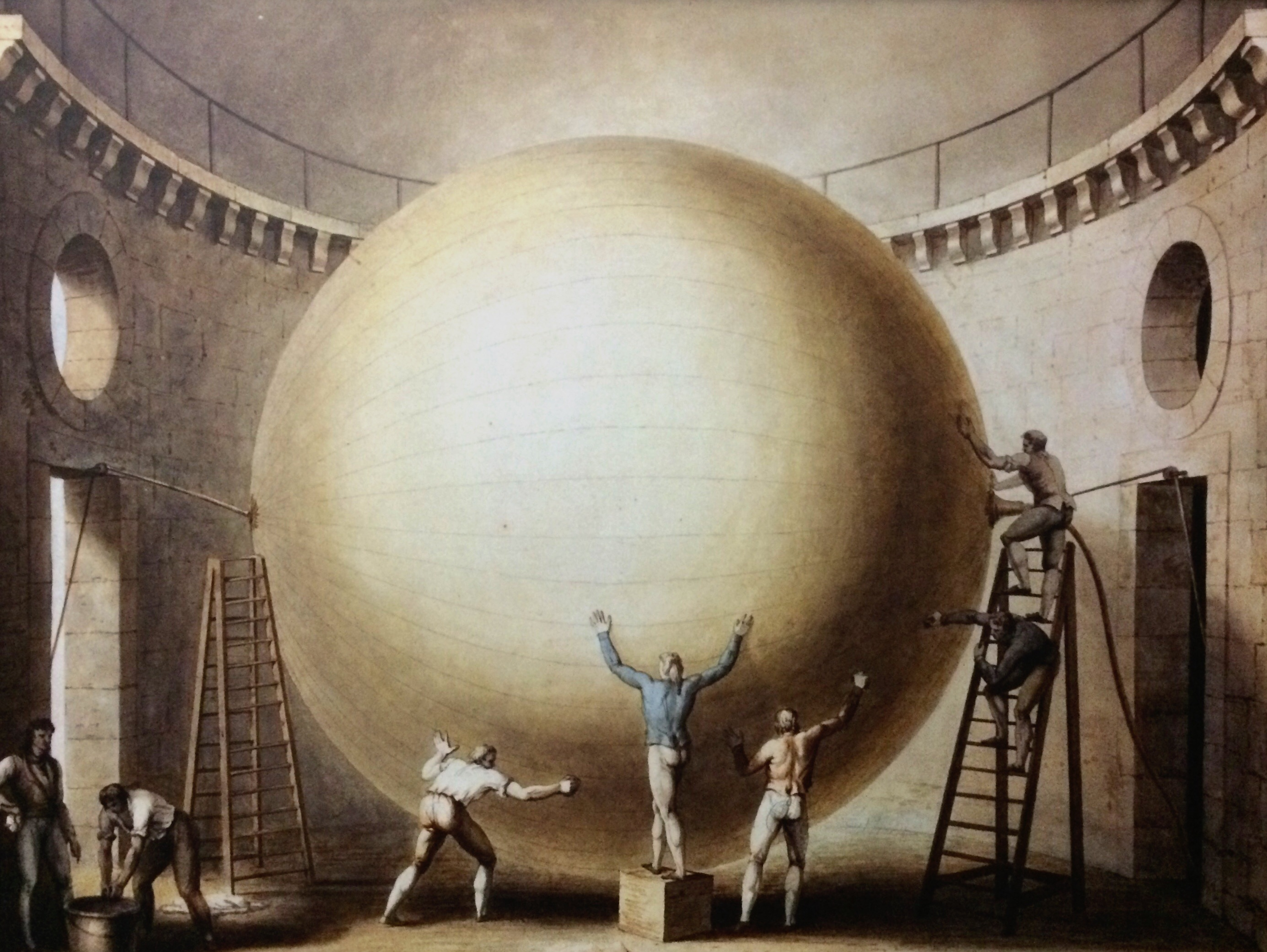
Étalage du vernis et vérification des joints (4/5)

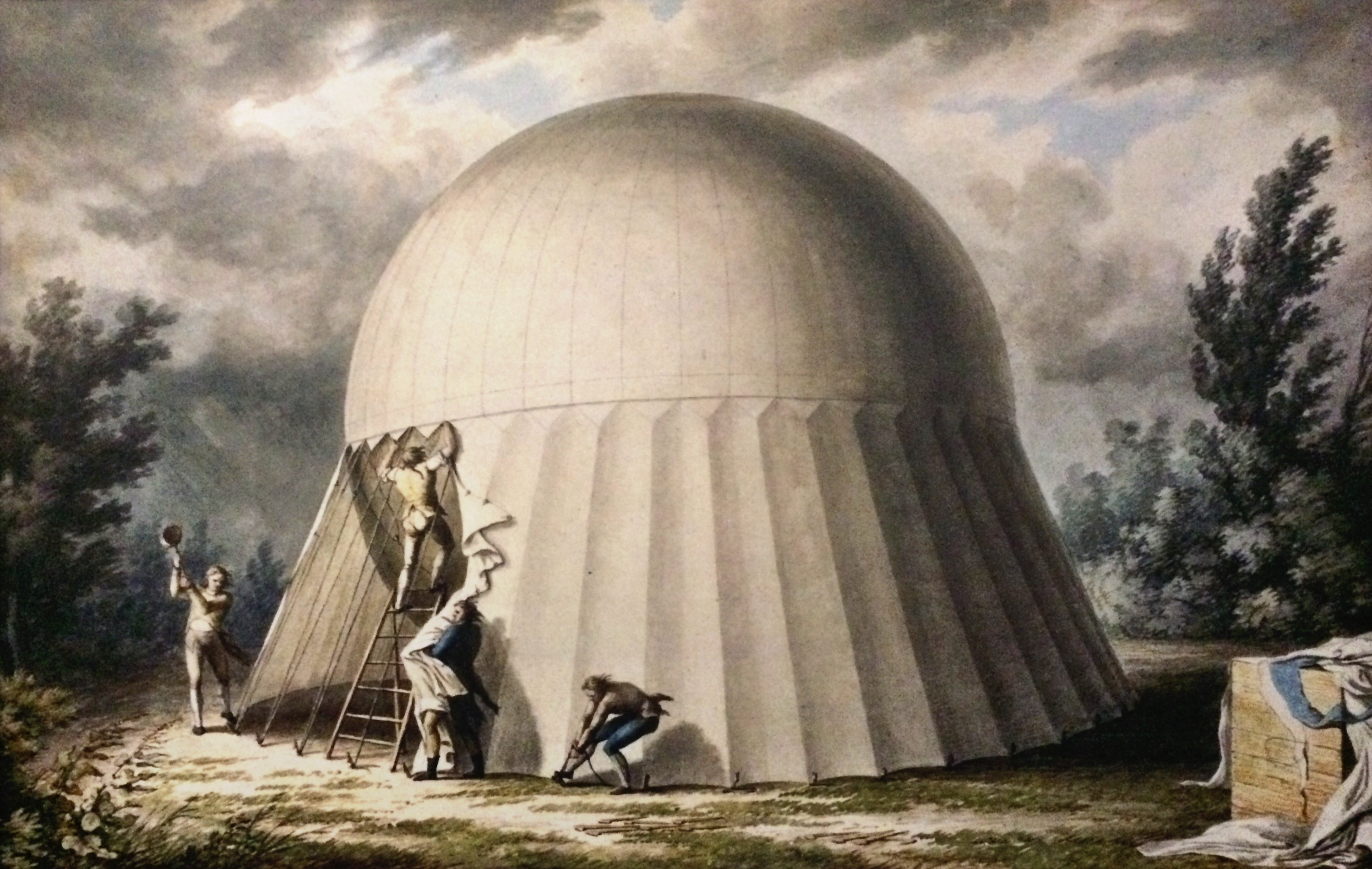
Aérostat au campement sous sa tente de protection (5/5)

==== Château-Vieux fire and demolition ====
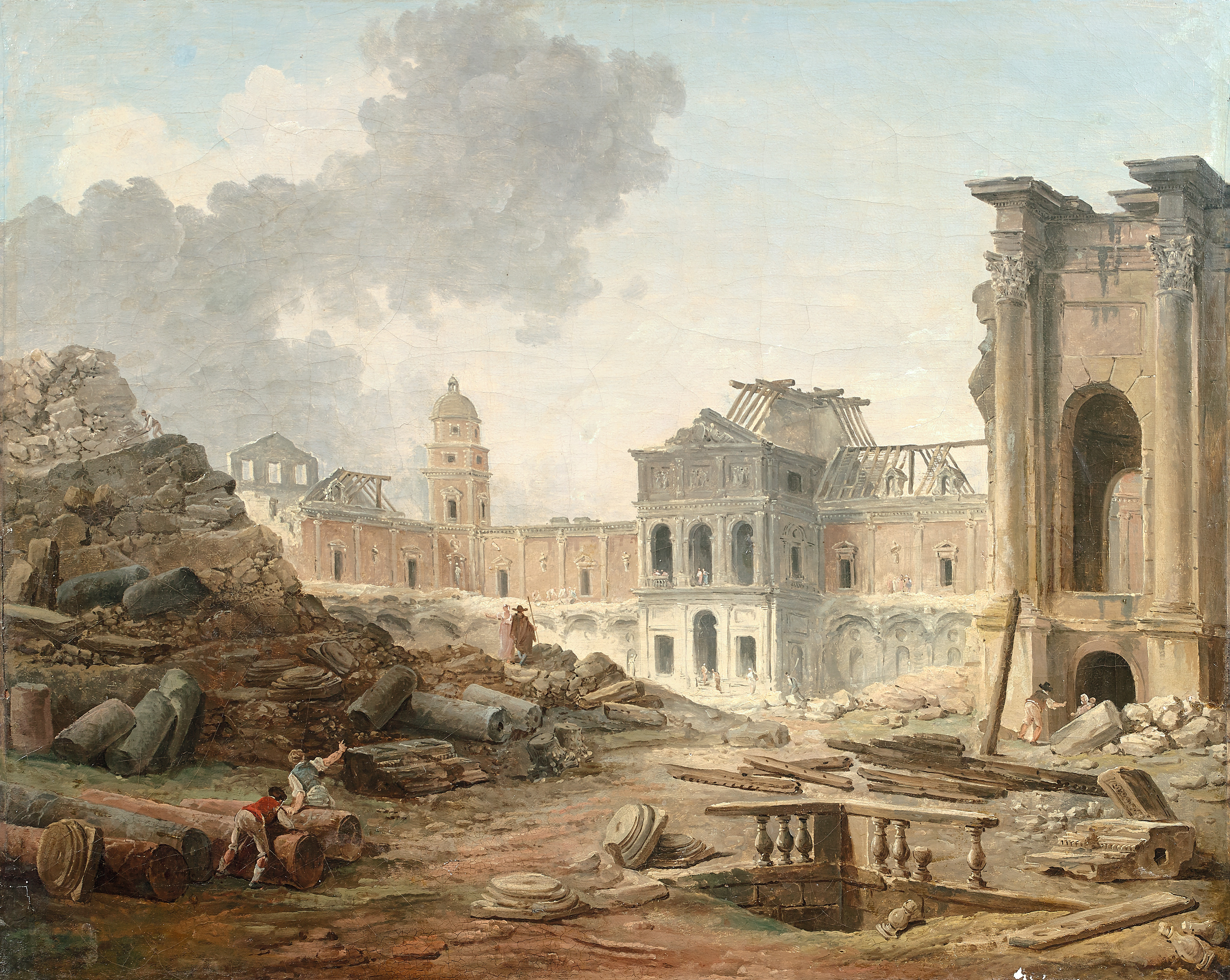
Depiction of the Château-Vieux's demolition (1804) by Hubert Robert, held at the Museum of the Department of Sceaux

In 1795, a fire, linked to the technical research of the occupants, ravaged the chestnut tree wing and damaged the west wing of the Château-Vieux. The castle remained in this condition for nearly a decade. Many English visitors such as James Forbes, came to Meudon from 1802, and left several descriptions or drawings. English Colonel Thomas Thornton, of Thornville-Royal, Yorkshire, describes the site in a letter written in English, dated August 31, 1802:

The castle of Meudon, originally residence of Madame de Pompadour [sic], consists of an immense block, unfortunately, dilapidated. It nevertheless retains some traces of its past splendor... my guide informed me that it included farms, plains, etc., all within 500 acres, to which 10,000 acres of forest. He also told us that the walls were once partly collapsed, on the orders of the late king, in order to give the game the possibility of escape, but that these had since been repaired. He also pointed out that the estate comprised 29 water bodies of various sizes, leading me immediately to one of them, with a capacity of about 9 acres. The latter was walled and partly surrounded by a wooded landscape, but its shape offered, from a distance, a pleasant rendering. It was also necessary to take into account the presence of some fish, hares and rabbits, as well as a reasonable number of partridges on the estate. On the other hand, all the pheasants had been slaughtered. The whole of the castle, as I said before, is now in ruins, and to entirely shave it would entail considerable expense, the cement of these old buildings being particularly solid. But from the point of view of its extent and its proximity to the capital, Meudon would undoubtedly constitute a precious acquisition (...)

The painter Hubert Robert, in charge of the landscaping at Meudon under Louis XVI, came to draw the demolition site in 1804. The Château-Vieux was destroyed in 1803. In 1805, a small part of the Château-Vieux (southwestern pavilion) and the chapel remained, as indicated by François Collet Duclos in his report of 3 Ventôse 13 (February 22, 1805). The whole was the subject of excavation works until about 1808. Some ornaments were recovered, including the stone columns nowadays located in the small rotunda of the Luxembourg Palace, that the architect Jean-François Chalgrin was able to reuse.

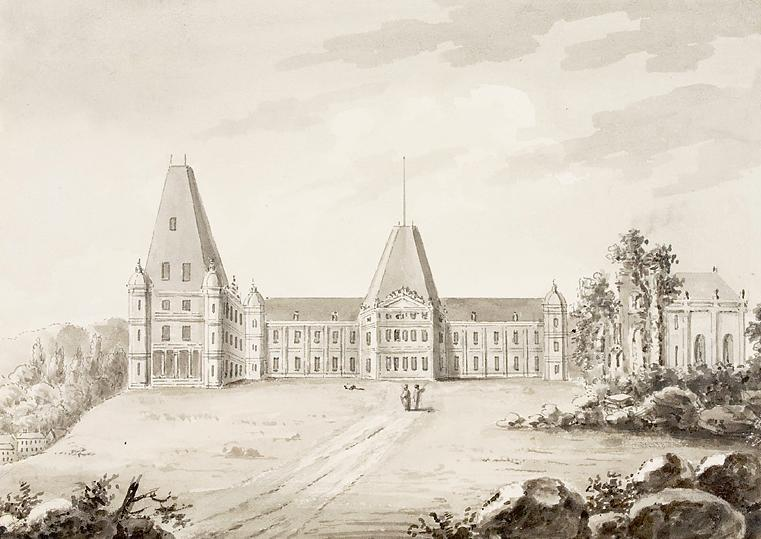
Le Château-Vieux de Meudon en ruines, en 1802. James Forbes, Musée du Domaine départemental de Sceaux

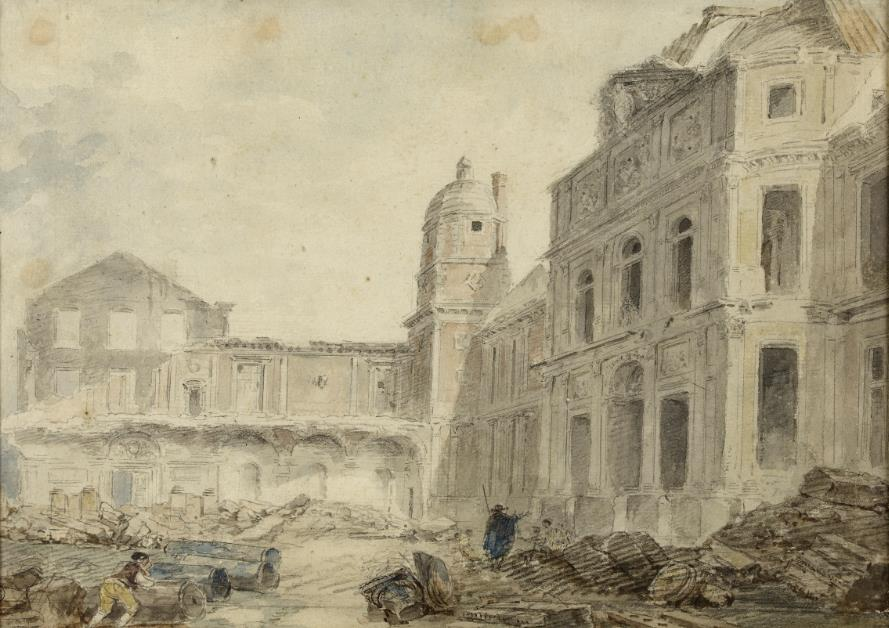
La démolition du Château-Vieux de Meudon, by Hubert Robert, 1804

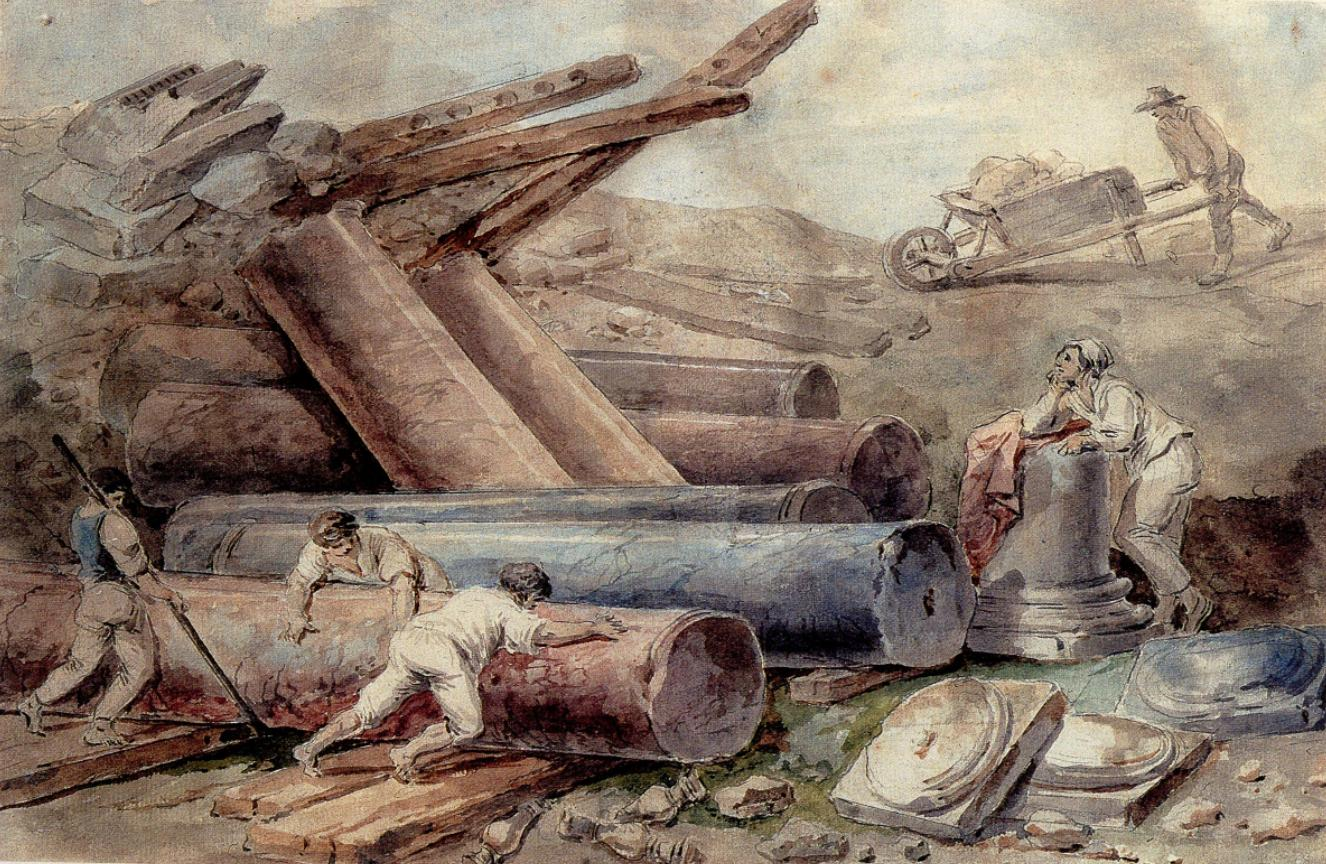
Trois ouvriers déplacent une colonne du château de Meudon. Hubert Robert, circa 1804. Musées de Weimar, Schossmuseum, KK 9110

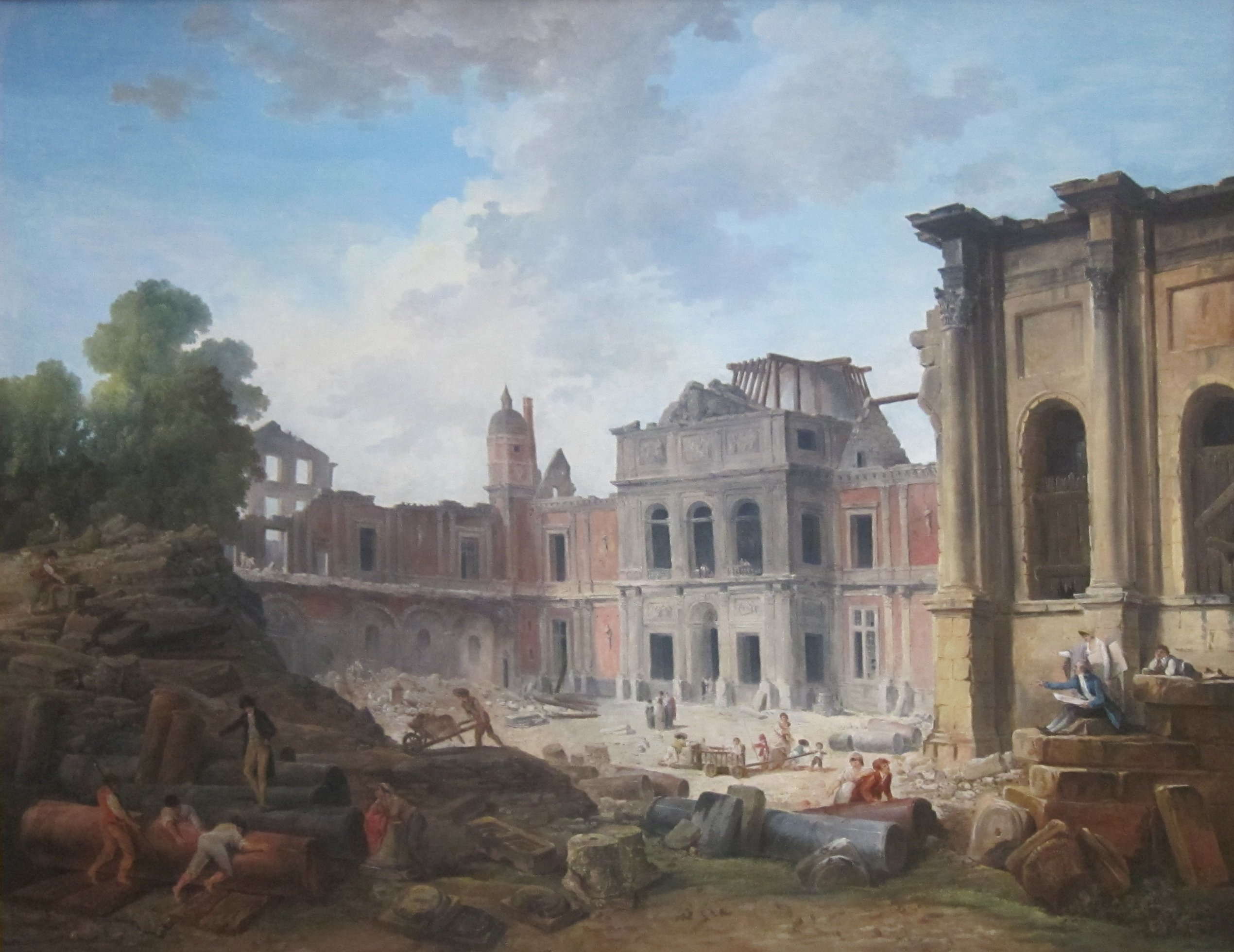
Démolition du Château-Vieux de Meudon, Hubert Robert, 1806. Getty Museum

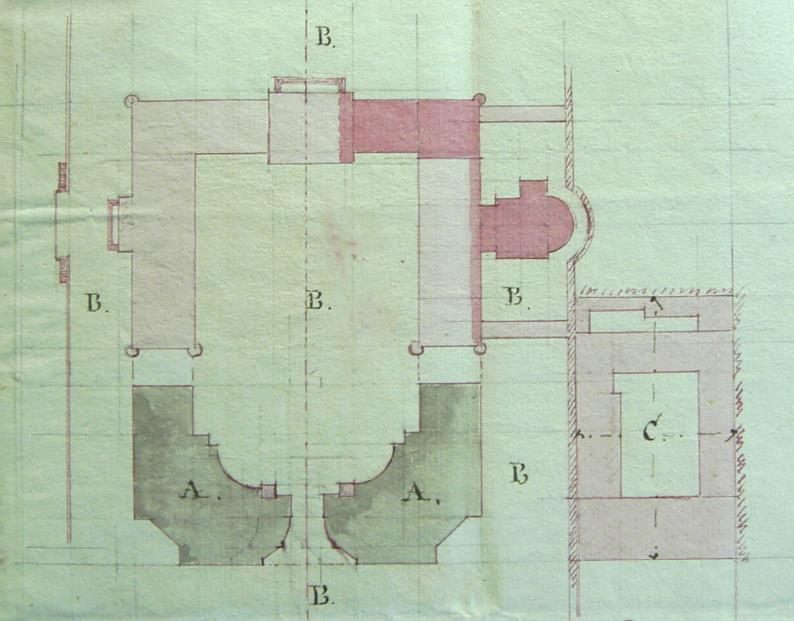
Schéma du Château-Vieux de Meudon en cours de démolition, 22 February 1805. En rose foncé, ce qu'il reste à démolir. ADY, 2Q 34

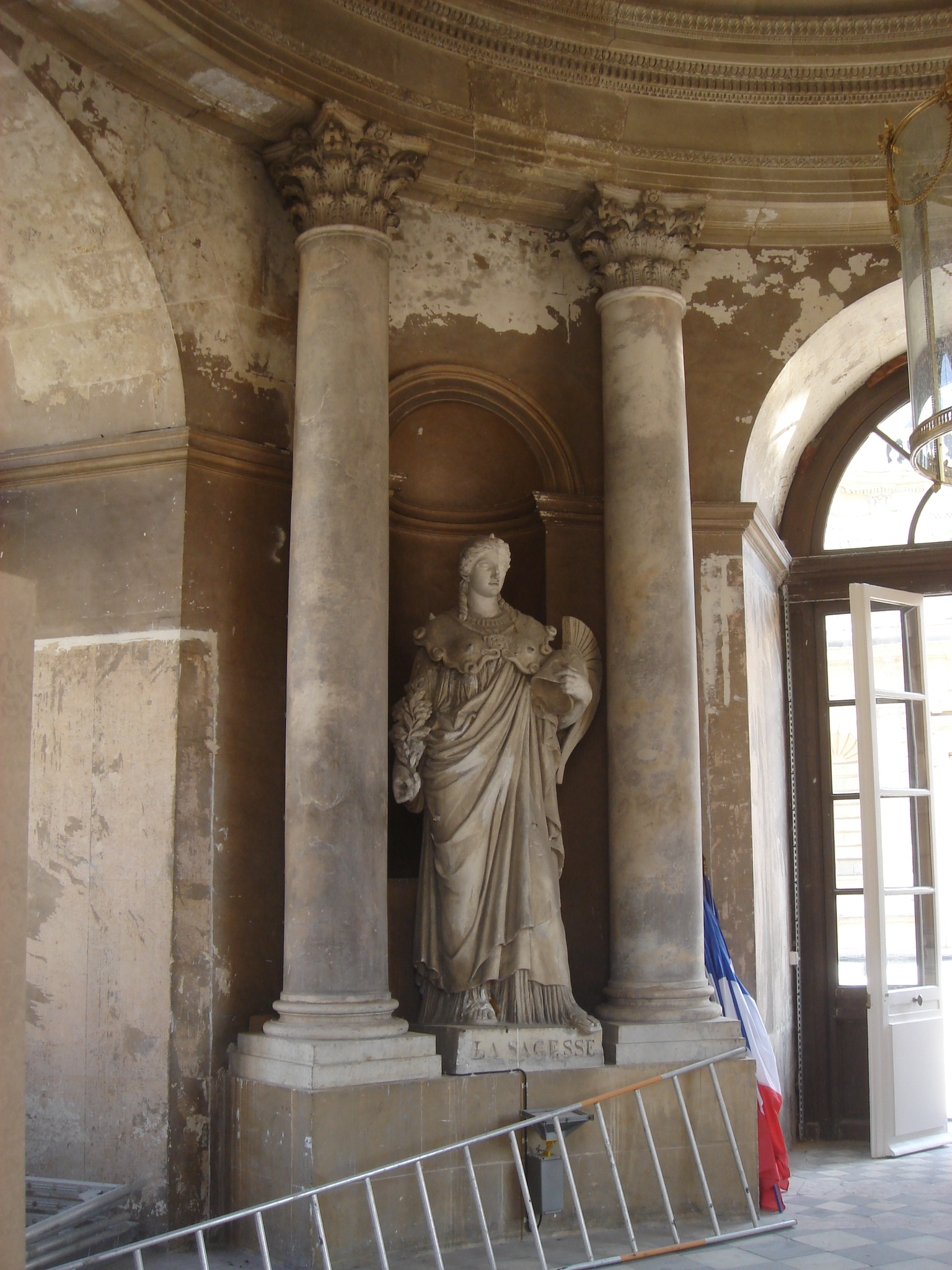
Columns from the château, taken to the rotonda of the Senate by Chalgrin

==== Napoleon : Meudon, Imperial Palace of the King of Rome (1807–1815) ====
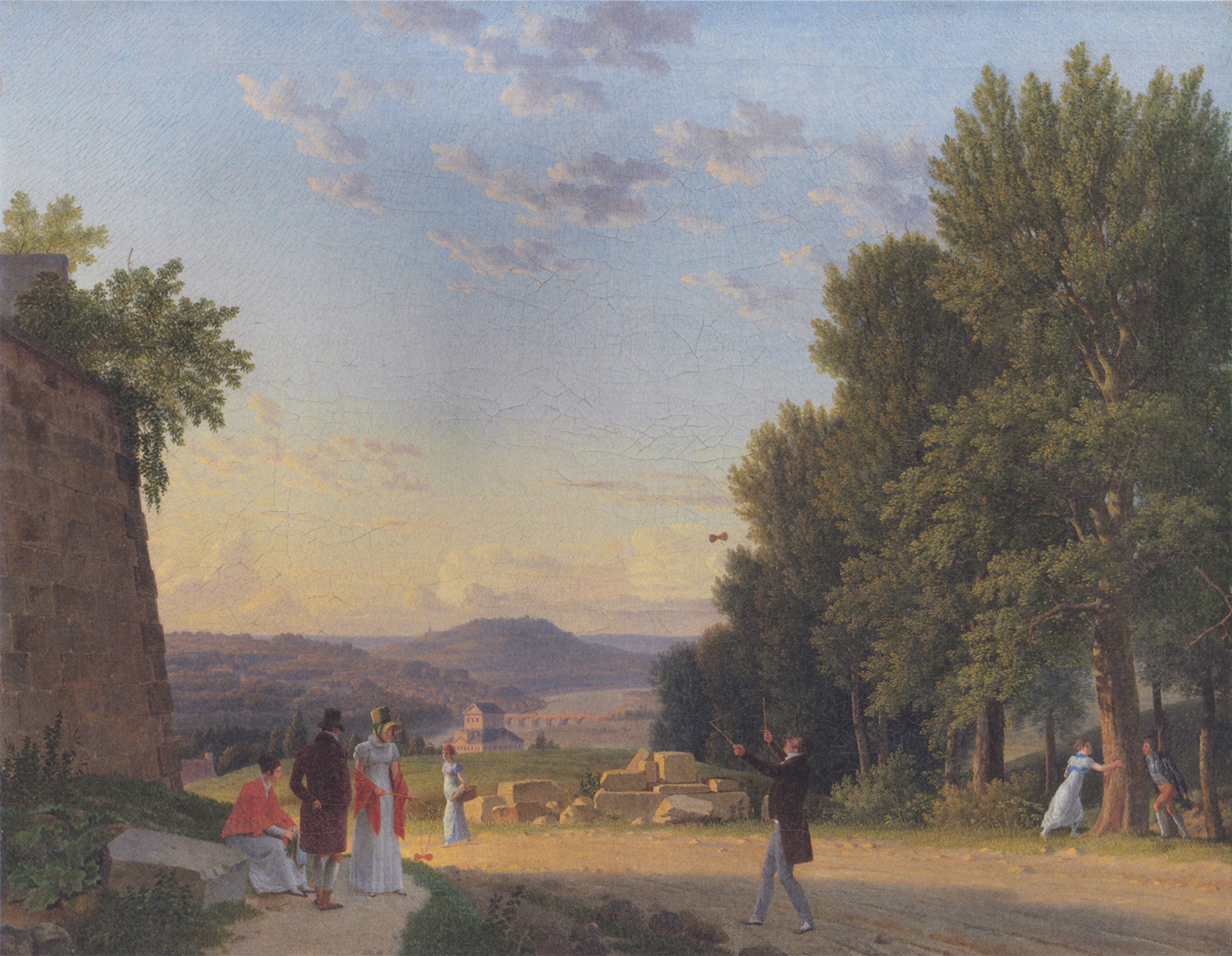
View from the base of the bastion des Capucins at Meudon, C.W. Eckersberg, 1813, Museum of Copenhagen KMS 1623

After deciding in 1803 to demolish the Château-Vieux, which had been burnt down in 1795, and when he was only General Bonaparte, Emperor Napoleon decided in 1807 to make the Château-Neuf an imperial palace. He restored the gardens and refurbished the Château-Neuf, notably by the architect Jean-Baptiste Lepère. A wing called the "Economat" was erected on the site of a part of the ruins of the chestnut wing. The Emperor, who wanted to make Meudon a "school of kings" in Europe, installed the King of Rome in 1811, under the responsibility of his governess, Louise Charlotte Françoise de Montesquiou. To this end, numerous orders were made to furnish the palace of the Empire's heir (new Empire style decoration), furnishings, silks, etc.).

On April 22, 1811, Napoleon visited Meudon. On June 30, 1811, Meudon was placed at the disposal of 'Madame Mother' Letizia Bonaparte. In April 1812, the King of Rome came to stay at Meudon. During the summer, the Queen of Westphalia, wife of Jerome Bonaparte, also stayed at Meudon, with Madame Mother. From March 24 to November 14, 1813, the Queen of Westphalia made another visit to Meudon.

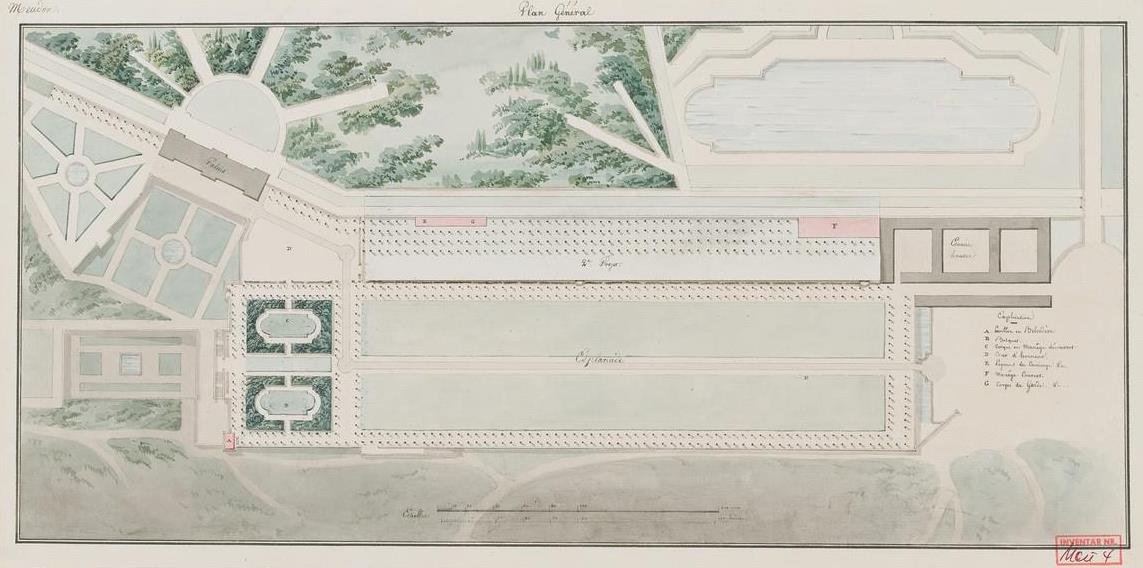
Drawing for the terrace refusing under Napoleon I, by Jean-Baptiste Lepère, c. 1808

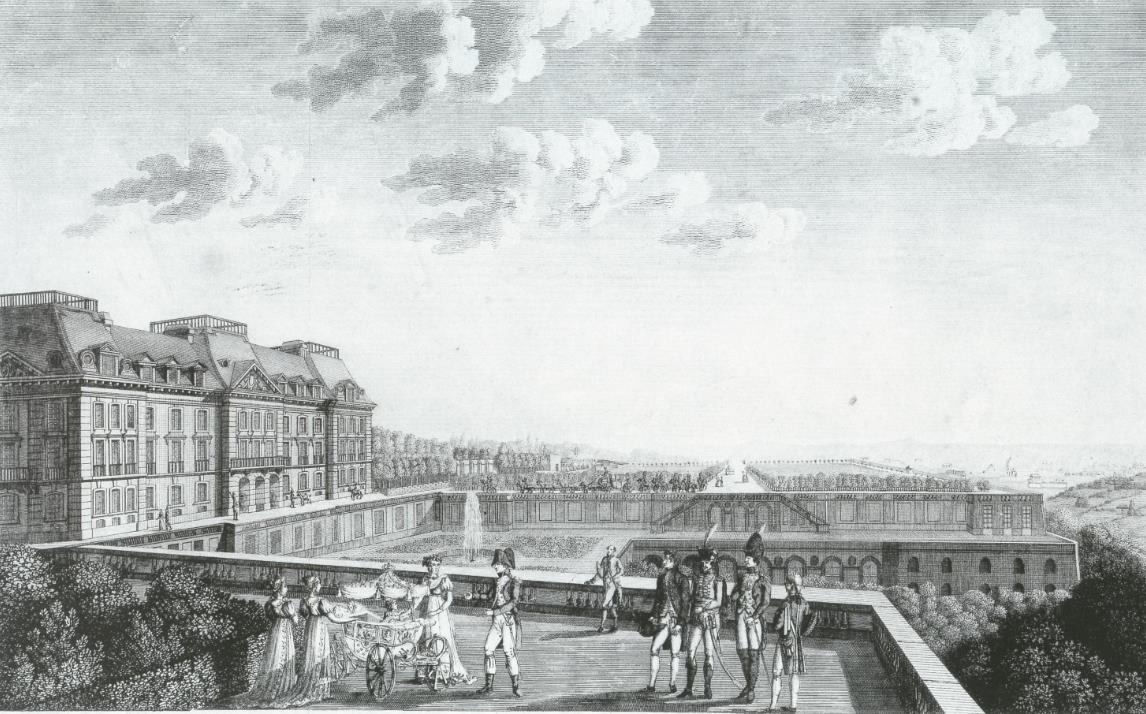
Château de Meudon c. 1812, First Empire

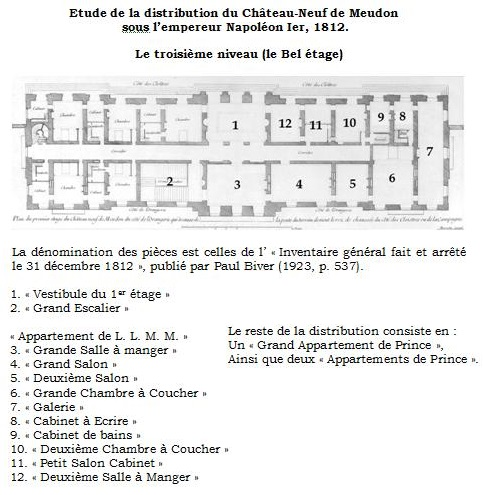
Layout of the third level of the Château-Neuf under Napoleon I, 1812

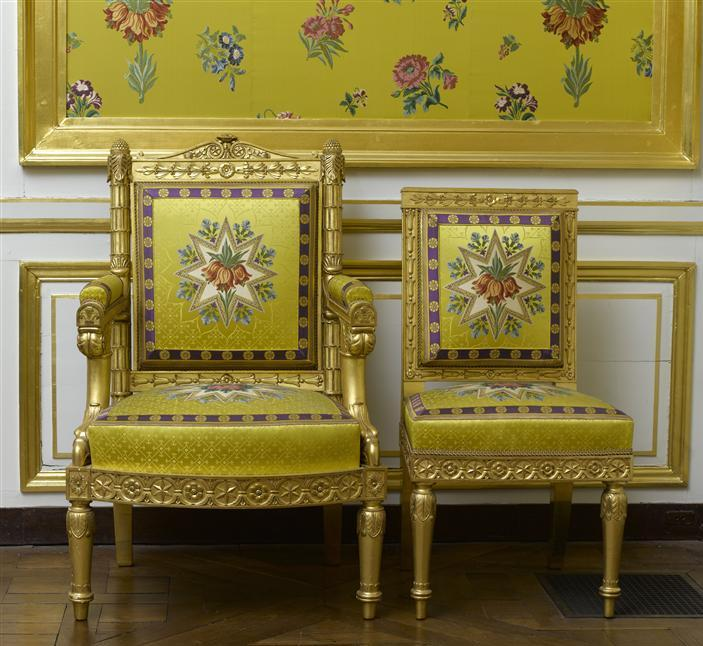
Seating ordered by Napoleon I for Meudon, Palace of Fontainebleau

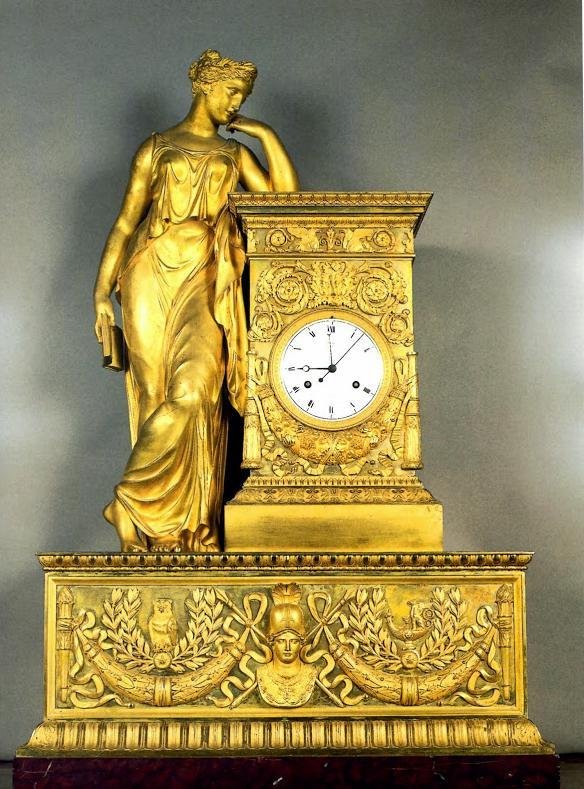
Pendulum of Study or Meditation, c. 1810, Mobilier National.
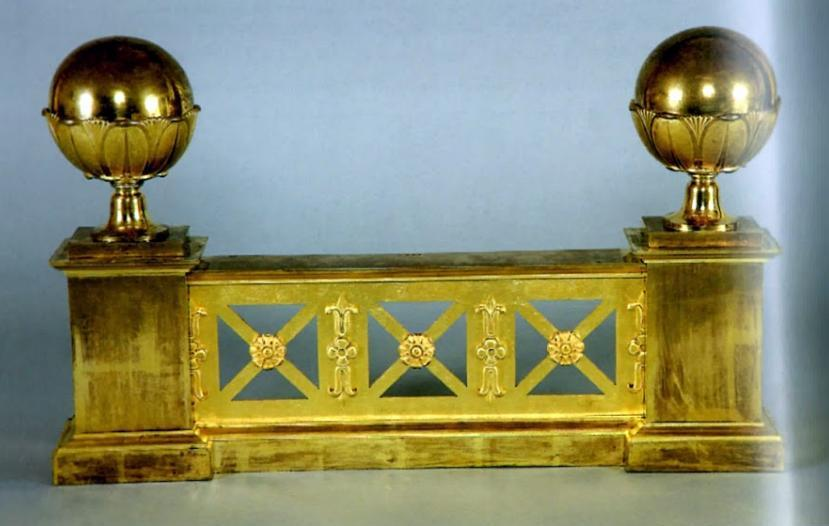
Gilded bronze firedogs, c. 1810–1811, Jean-Jacques Feuchère, Mobilier National

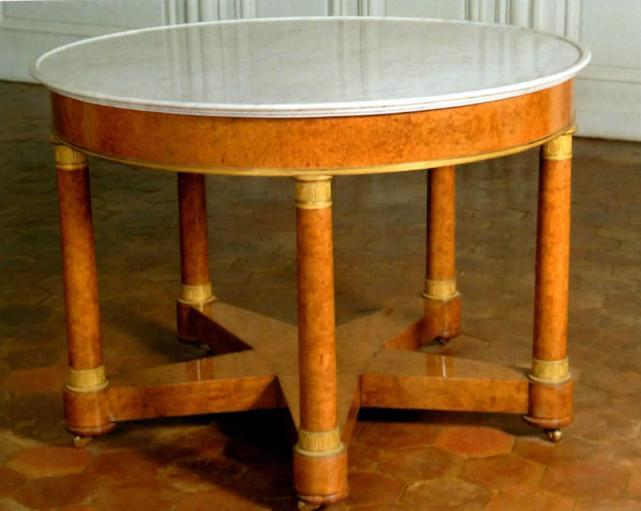
Guéridon, gilt bronze ash wood and white marble, Mobilier National

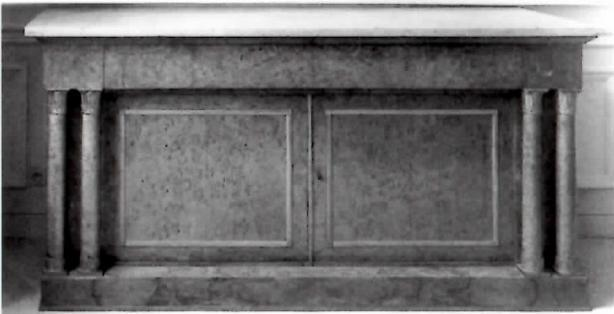
Console by Maigret, ash and white marble, Mobilier National

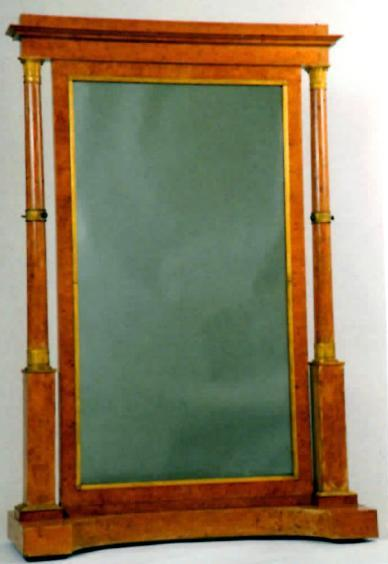
Écran à glace, bois de frêne, gilded bronze, mirror, Mobilier National

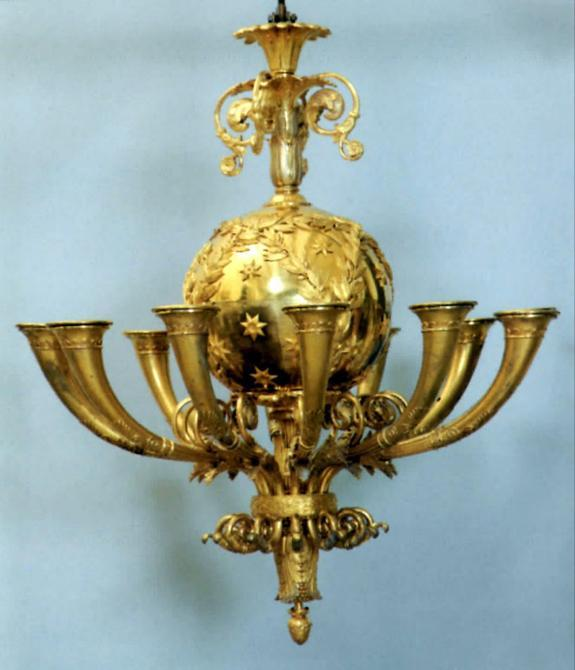
Chandelier in the gallery of the Château-Neuf, c. 1811, gilded bronze, Feuchère, Mobilier National

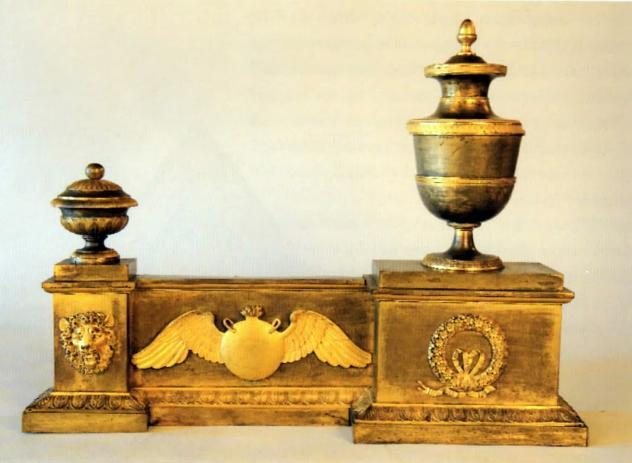
Furniture piece from the gallery of the Château-Neuf de Meudon, Mobilier National

==== Meudon under the Restoration and the Orleans ====
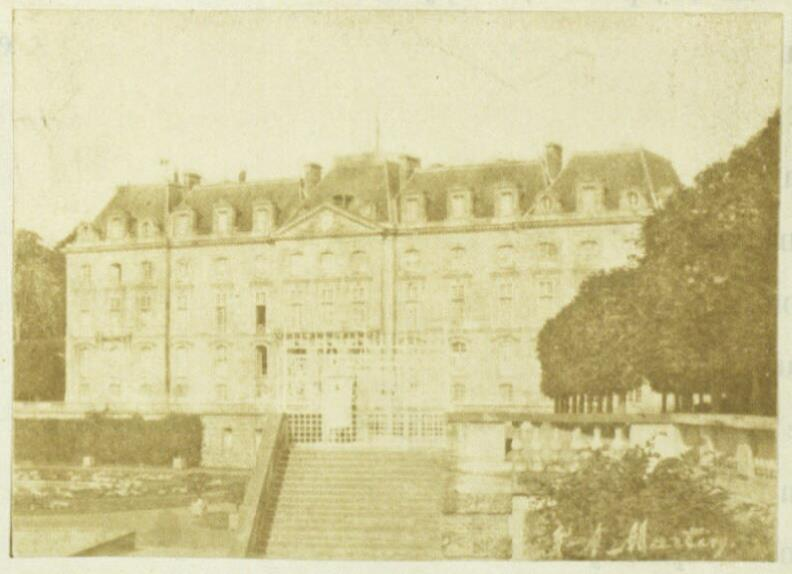
Photograph of Château-Neuf in 1850 taken by Louis-Auguste Martin (1811–1875). Albertina Museum, FotoGLV2000/13822/7

Louis XVIII, Charles X and Louis-Philippe used Meudon as a hunting ground near Versailles.

Charles Ferdinand, Duke of Berry, son of Charles X, went to Meudon to hunt between 1815 and 1820.

After his abdication of the Imperial throne of Brazil on April 7, 1831, Pedro I of Brazil returned to Europe and settled in France with the title of Duke of Braganza. In the autumn of 1831 he spent some time at the Château-Neuf, an estate King Louis-Philippe freely put at his disposal. During his stay in France, he became a friend of the famous General La Fayette.

A studio was then installed below the old gardens at the bottom of Meudon. Under the July Monarchy Ferdinand Philippe, Duke of Orléans, stayed there in 1834 and wrote his memoirs there. But in 1842 he died accidentally in Neuilly-sur-Seine.

Louis-Philippe also made available the castle of Meudon to Marshal Jean-de-Dieu Soult, who stayed there several times in the summer.

On May 8, 1842, a railway catastrophe took place in Meudon, in which Jules Dumont d'Urville perished. It was the first in France and one of the first in the world. Louis-Philippe I offered the Château-Neuf to treat survivors.

After the revolution of 1848, plans were made to make Meudon the new headquarters of the École polytechnique. But these grandiose projects, one of which was established by the architect Hector-Martin Lefuel, did not in the end see the light of day.

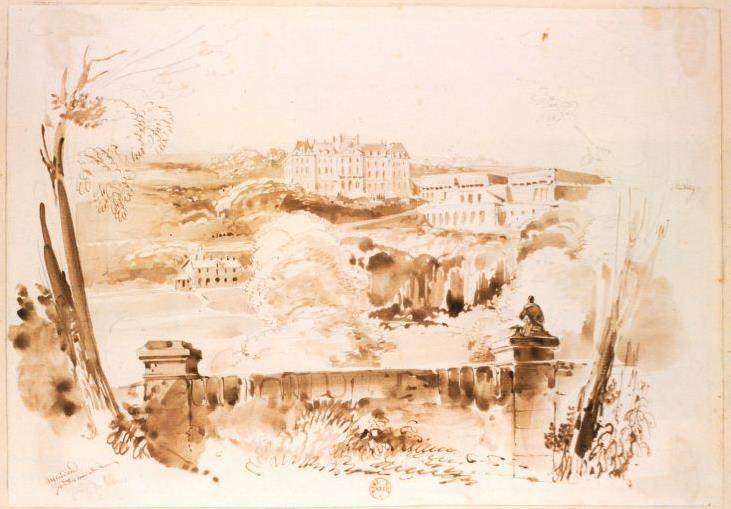
Meudon, taken from the walls of the stud farm, by Bergeron. Ca. 1825. BNF.

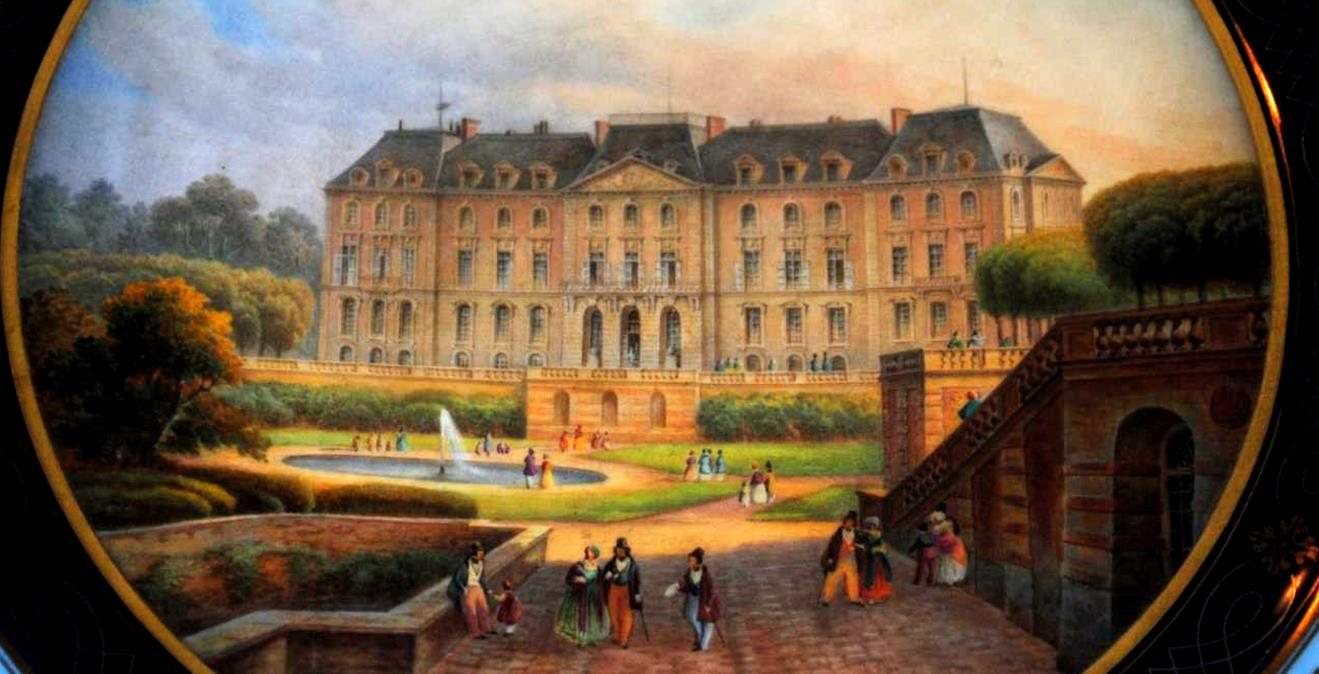
Detail of Sèvres porcelain representing the Château-Neuf of Meudon under Louis-Philippe. Palace of Fontainebleau, Galerie des Assiettes (Gallery of Plates).

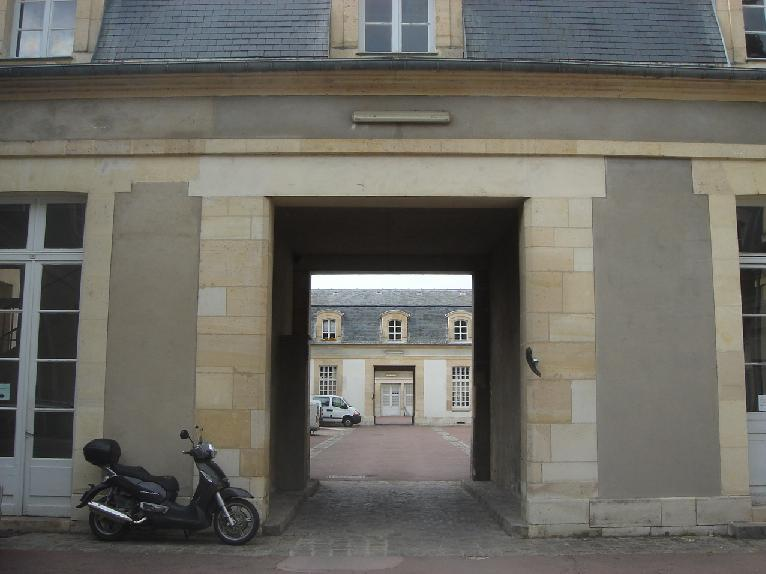
Stables at Meudon, preserved.

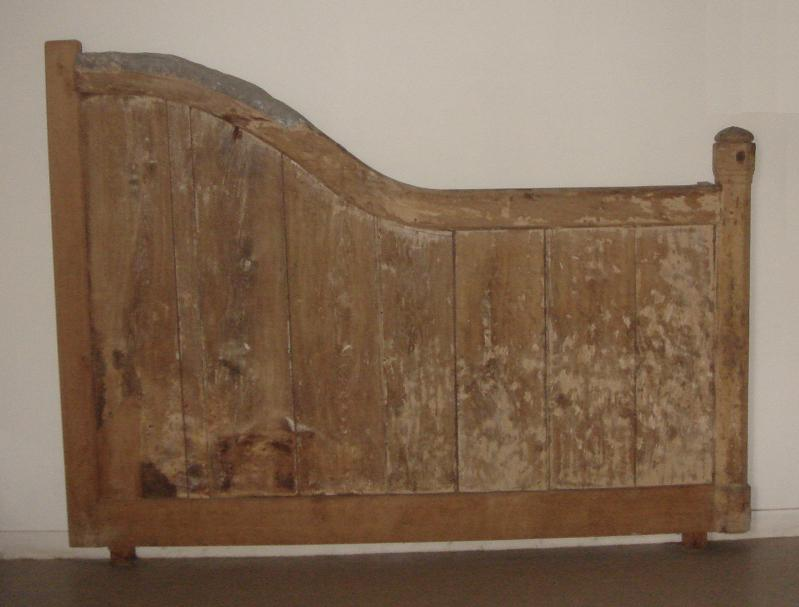
19th-century stall from the stables at Meudon.

==== Second Empire: hideout of Prince Napoleon ====
Although Meudon was assigned to Prince Jérôme Bonaparte uncle of Napoleon III, he did not visit the property. On the contrary, from 1860 to 1870, his son, Prince Napoléon-Jérôme Bonaparte, cousin of the Emperor Napoleon III, often occupied Meudon. In Paris, he owned the famous Pompeian house sheltering his connection with the actress Rachel Félix, but it was to Meudon that he came to "sulk" over the protocol at the imperial court, of which he was not fond. He brought his wife Marie-Clotilde of Savoy and her three children, Louis Bonaparte (1864–1932), Louis Victor and Marie Laetitia. He collected many species of plants and exotic animals, brought back from his travels abroad. Several large receptions were organized at the castle, such as the one in honor of King Luís I of Portugal, in 1867.

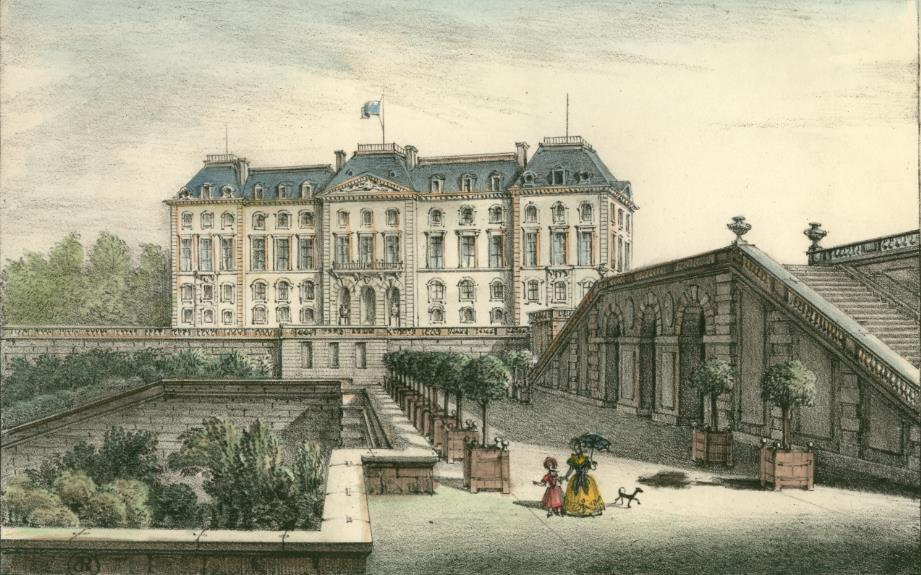
Château-Neuf de Meudon c. 1860

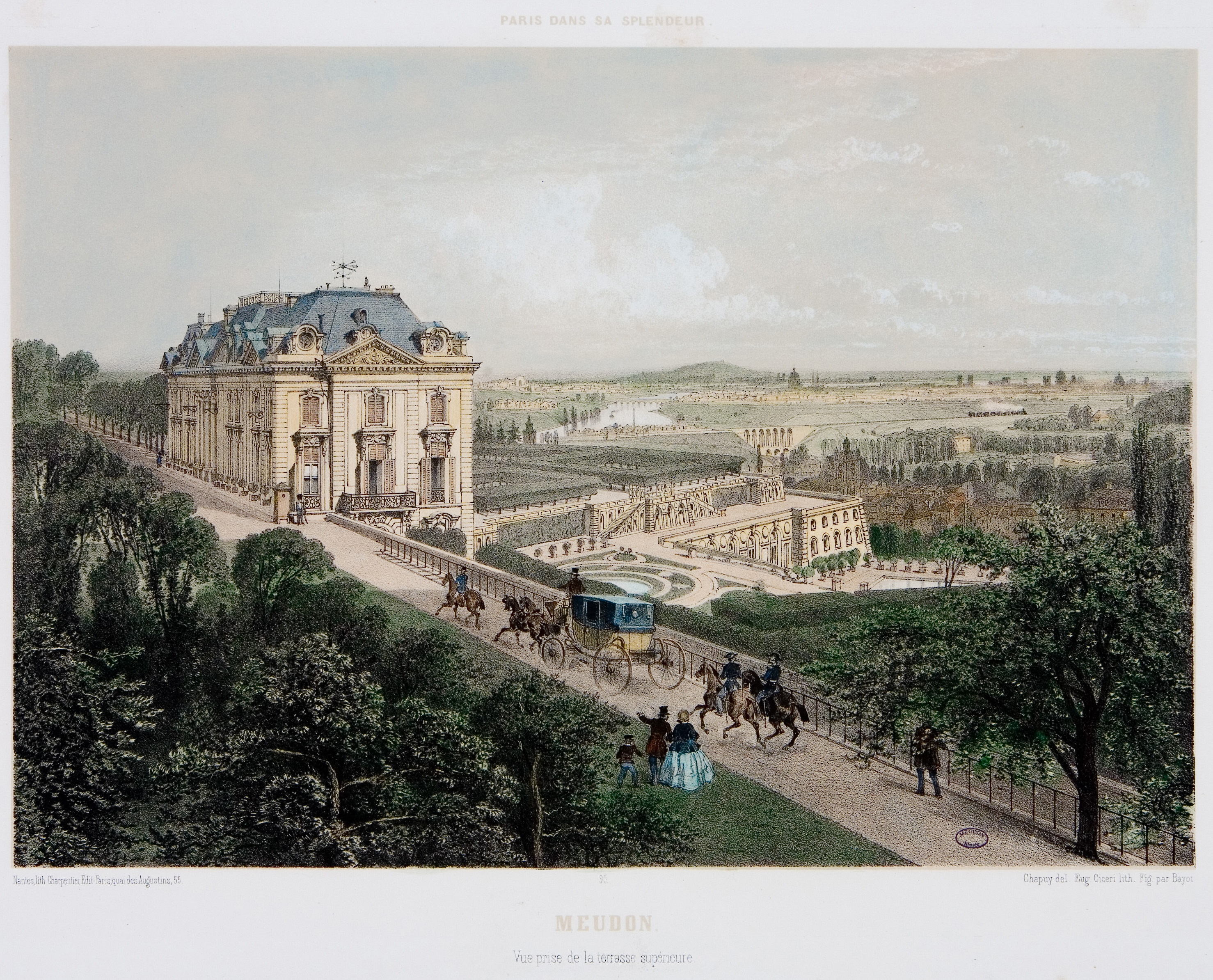
Meudon from the upper terrace. "Paris dans sa splendeur". Chapuis del.

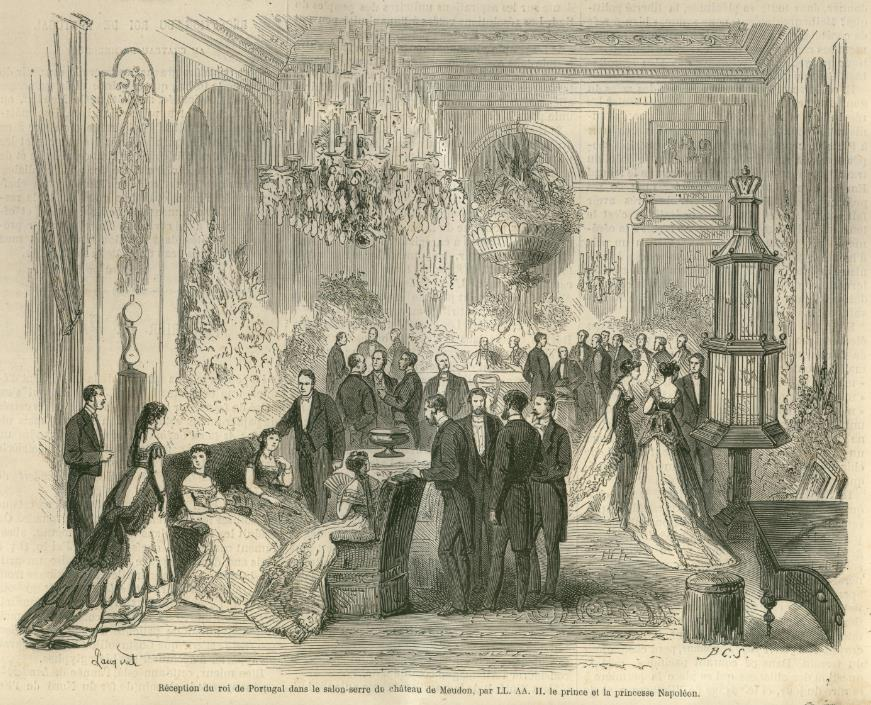
Reception for Luís I of Portugal given by Prince Napoléon, salon-serre of the Château-Neuf

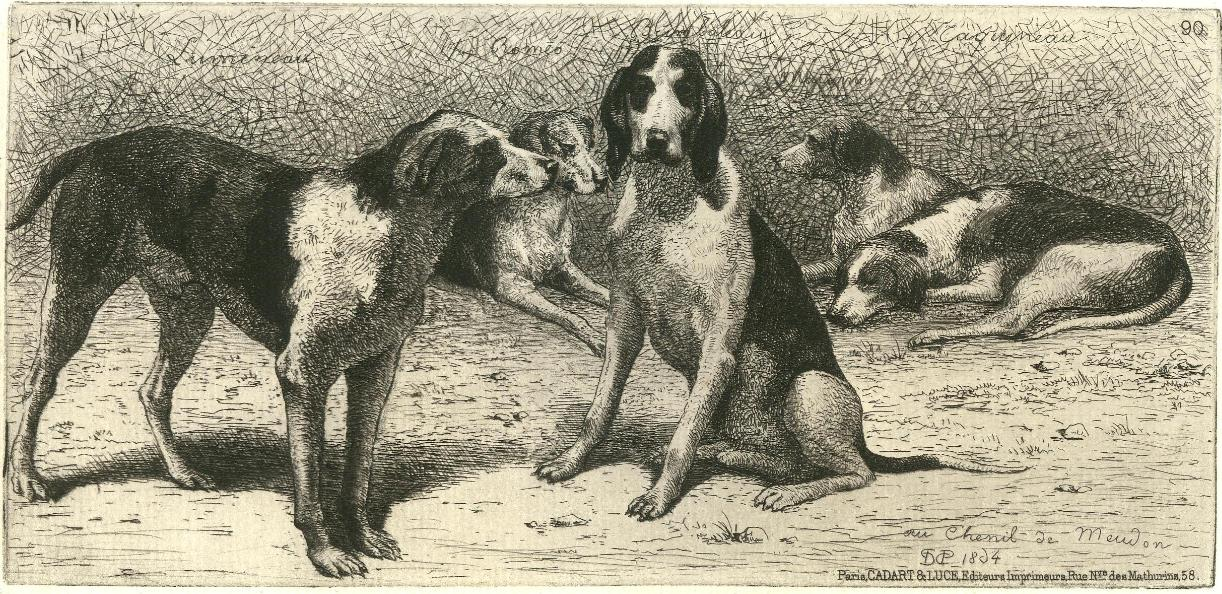
Meudon kennels and Prince Napoleon's dog

==== 1871 Château-Neuf fire and takeover by the Observatoire de Paris ====
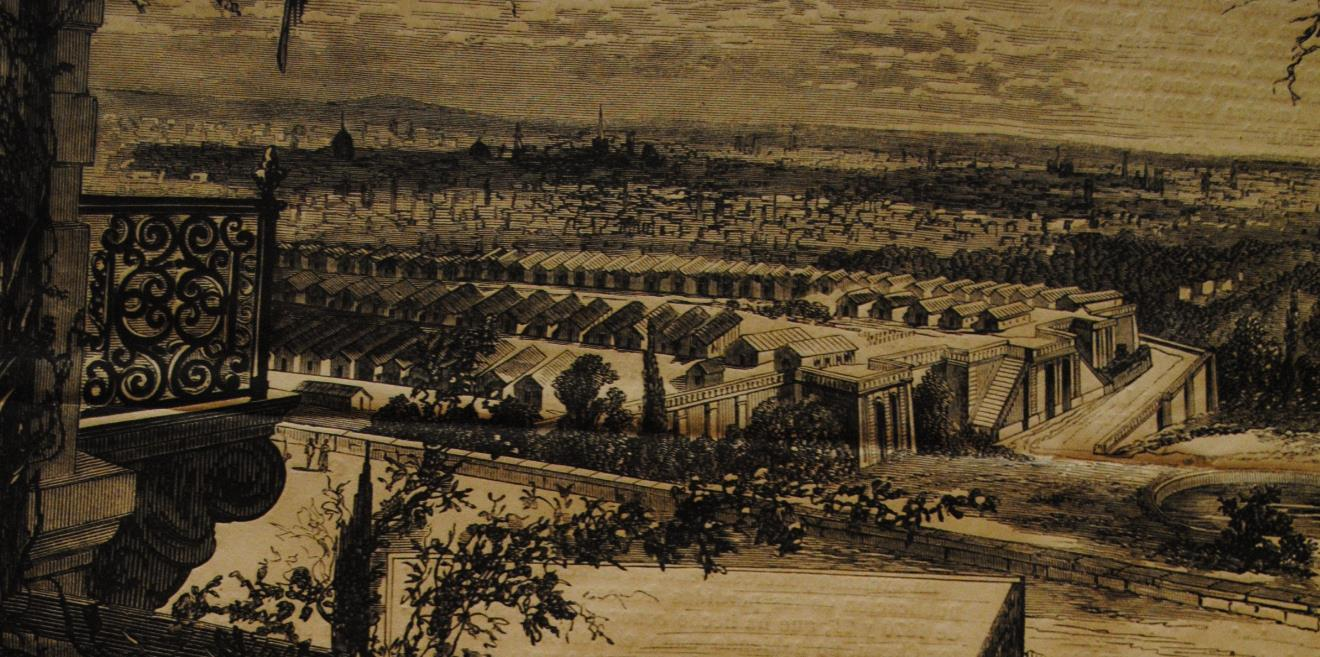
View from the terrace at Meudon's château-neuf during the Paris Commune, 1870

Because the site was strategic, dominating Paris, a battery of Prussian artillery was installed there in 1870. The new castle caught fire on 31 January 1871 and burned for almost three days. Hypotheses on the cause included either a deliberate fire set by the Prussians as they left, or a bombardment by La Douai , a naval cannon, placed in bastion 74 of the Thiers wall. The ruins were preserved for several years, until the site was entrusted to astronomer Jules Janssen in 1875. Janssen did not hesitate to raze nearly half the Château-Neuf, and together with architect Constant Moyaux, between 1880 and 1885 built there an astronomical observatory, later attached to the Paris Observatory in 1927.

Since then most of the estate (high preserved gardens) has been closed to the general public, and remains so to this day.

Drawings and photographs, Château-Neuf ruins

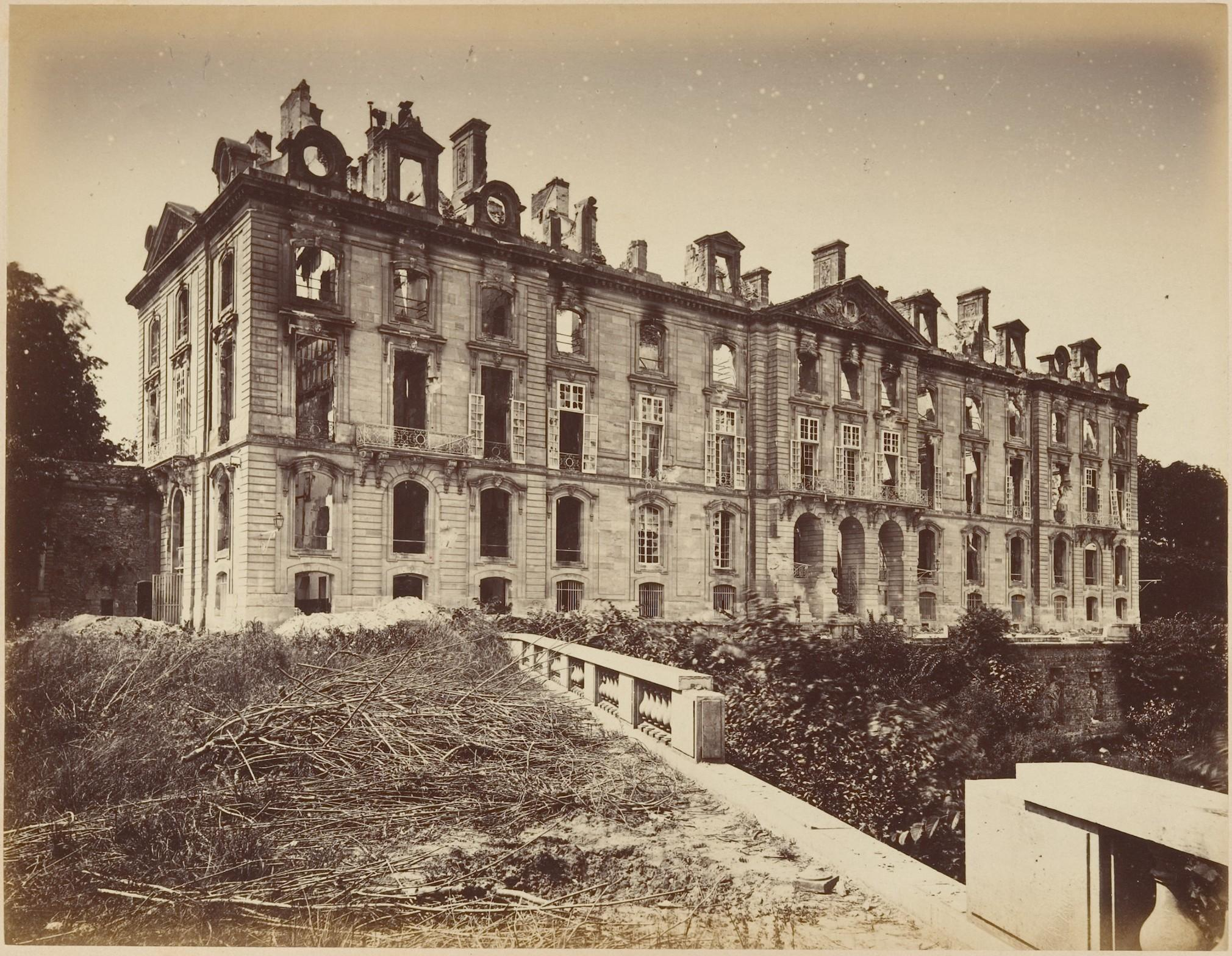
Château-Neuf after the fire of 31 January 1871

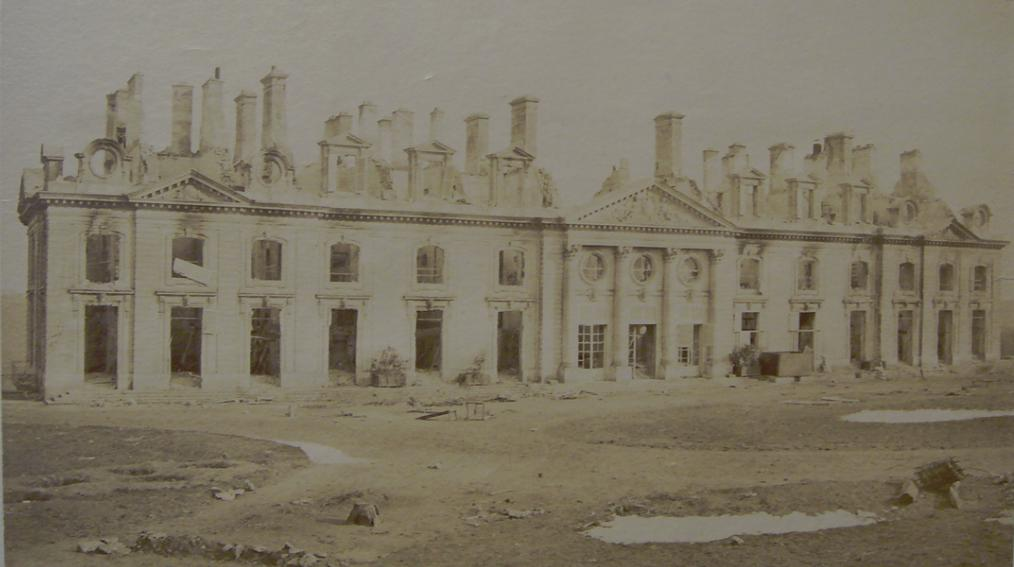
Photograph of the Château-Neuf after the fire, 1871. Private collection

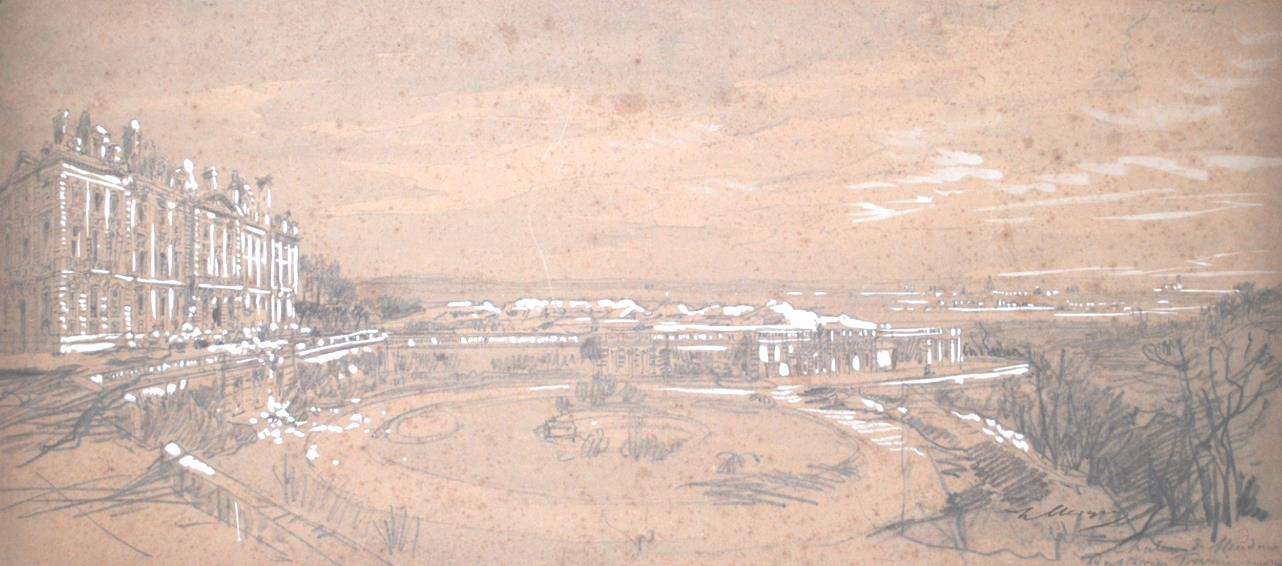
View of Meudon after the war of 1871. Hubert Clerget, Musée Carnavalet

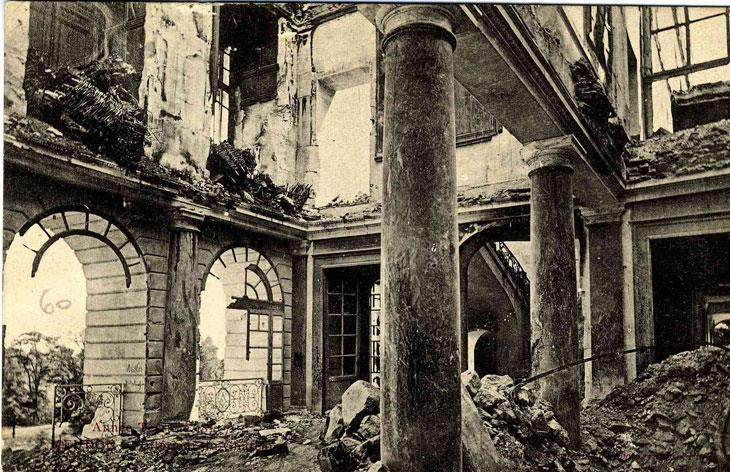
Photograph of the lower vestibule of the Château-Neuf after the 1871 fire

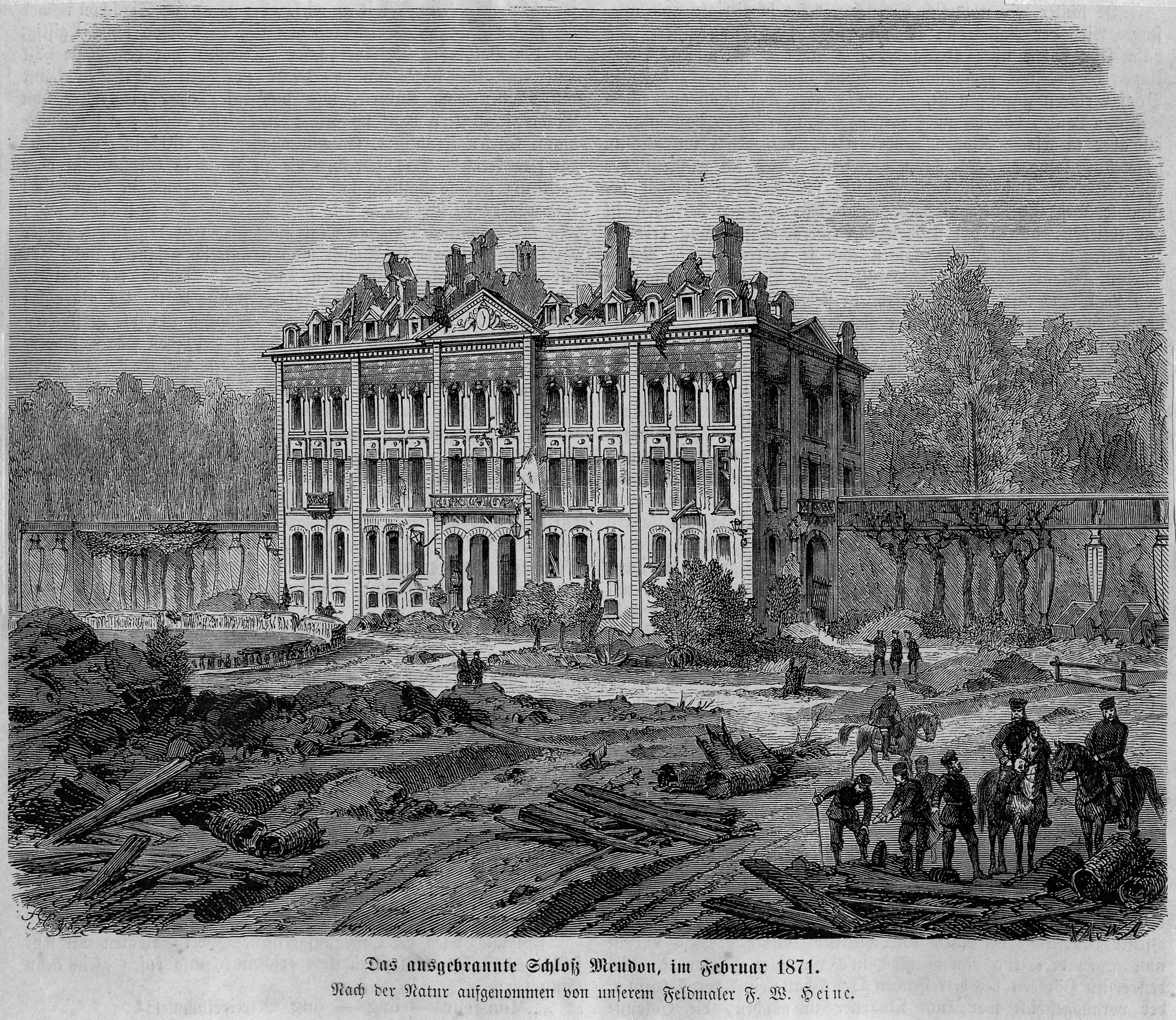
Ruins of Château-Neuf and surroundings, February 1871

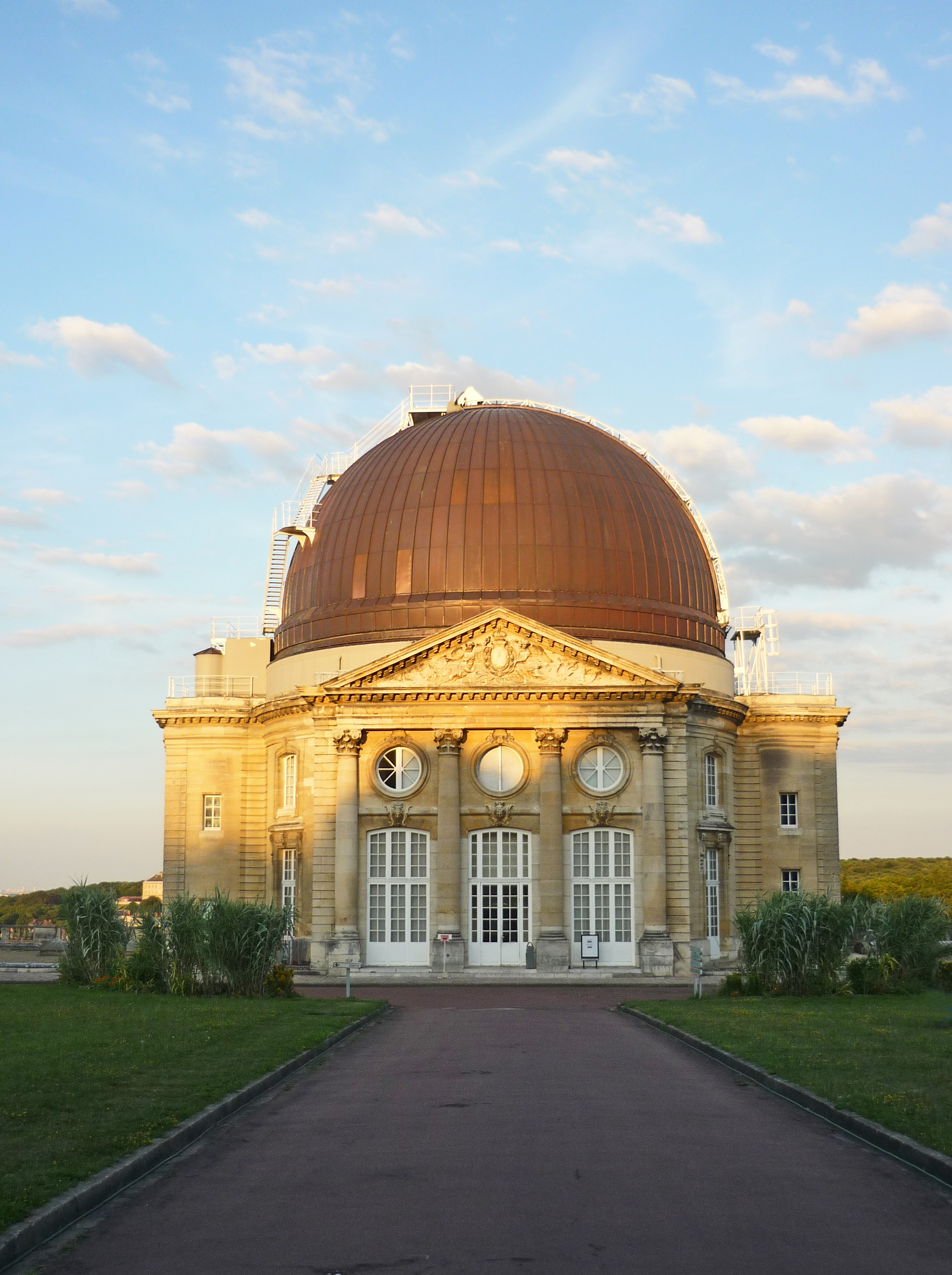
Grande Coupole of the Paris Observatory in the restored Château Neuf at Meudon.

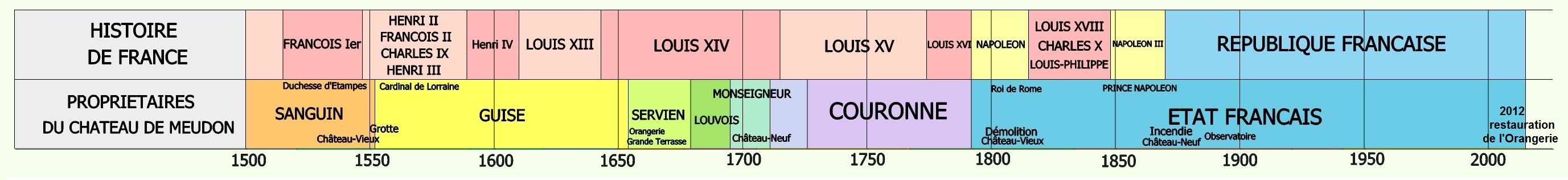
Timeline showing the successive owners of the château of Meudon

=== The 20th century: a gradual renovation ===
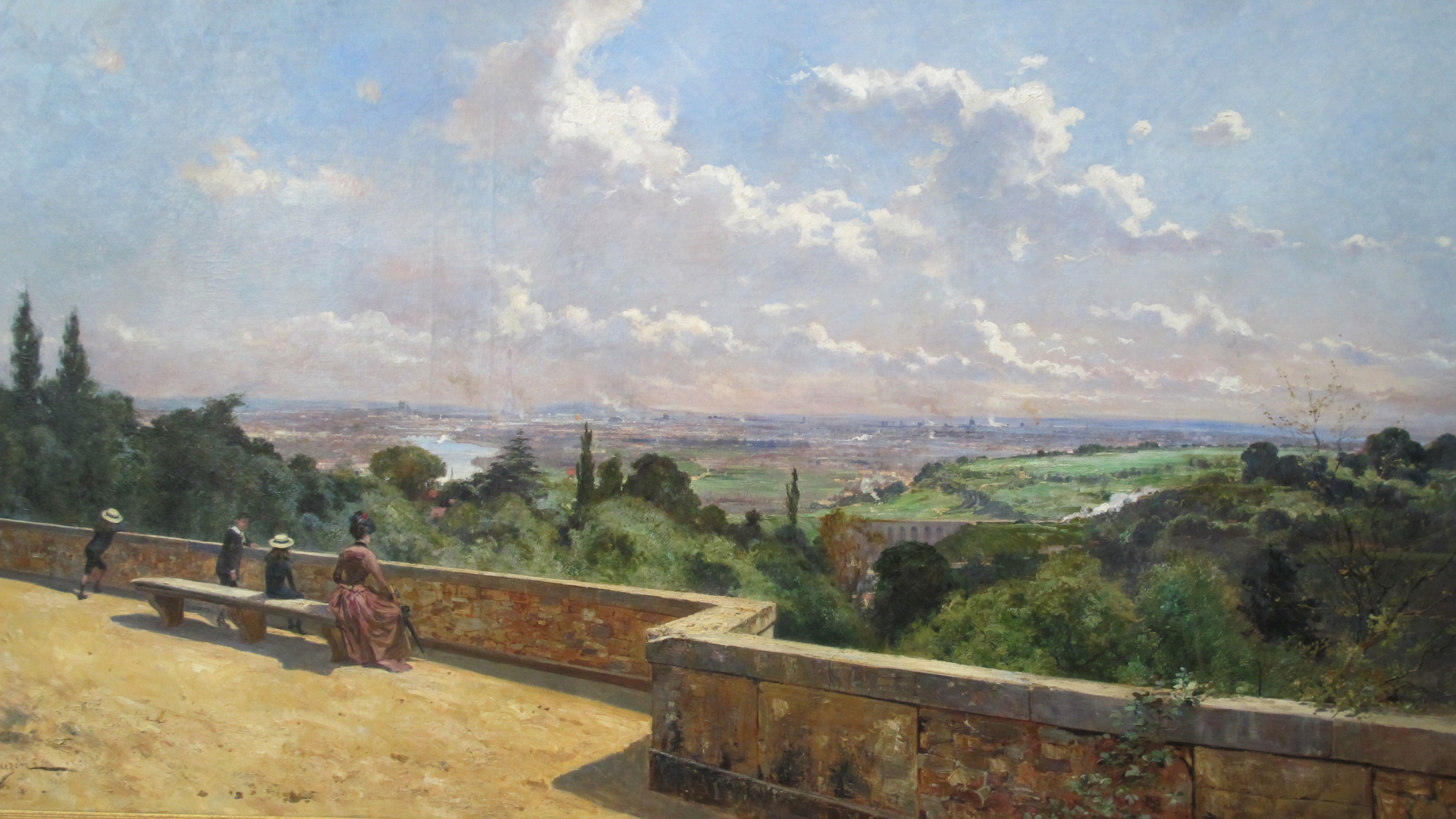
View of Paris from the terrace at Meudon, 1889, Louis Tauzin, Musée des Beaux-Arts in Bordeaux

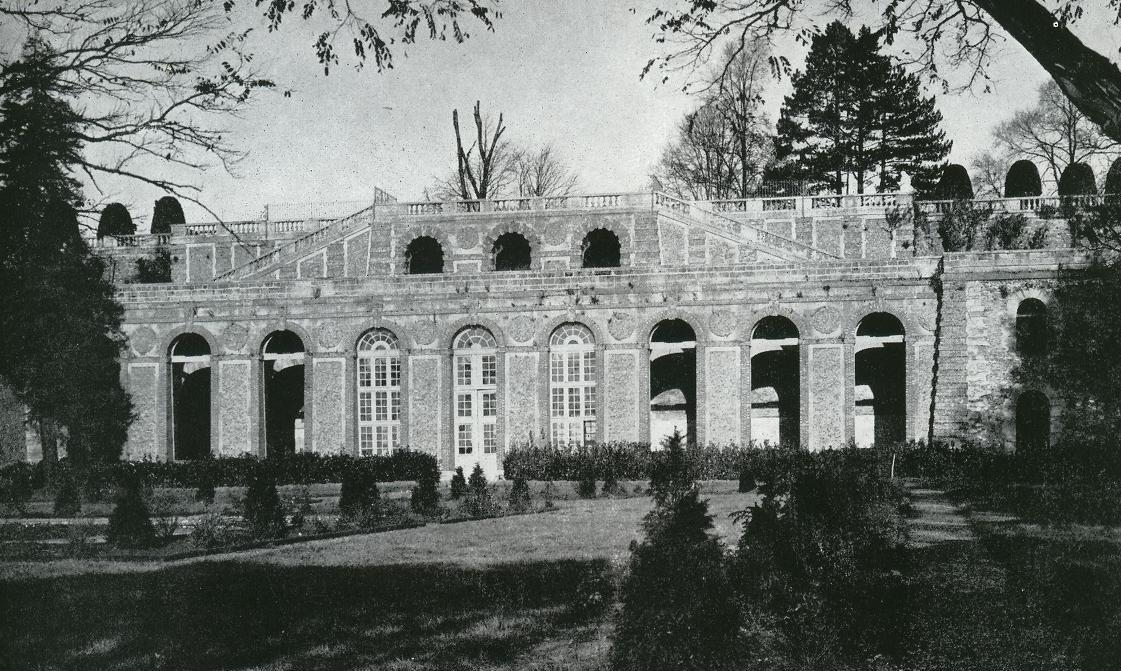
Photograph of the Orangery in Meudon, first half 20th century. Musée d'Art et d'Histoire de Meudon

Over the years, vegetation has encircled the Orangery, making it inaccessible. The destruction of the old village of Meudon after the war, and the reconstruction of the city center, has removed the once picturesque setting of multiple roofs at the foot of the old castle. The notion of heritage did not gain traction in French society until the 1970s and 1980s. The entire estate is now registered as a historic monument, though this was done very late for such a historic site, while similar large estates in Ile-de-France had been declared historic well before.

==== The domain today ====
Although the Château-Vieux was destroyed, it still retains its footprint. In fact, 40% of the surface area of the original buildings, (the remains of the Château-Neuf, orangerie, communes, etc), still exists. One can still view the avenue of the castle traced by Louvois, the guardhouses and common of the Grand Dauphin, the kennel of Louvois, the great prospect of Servien, and the nymphs and orangery of Louis Le Vau. And above all, the large terrace, is preserved. The orangery of Meudon was completely restored in 2012.

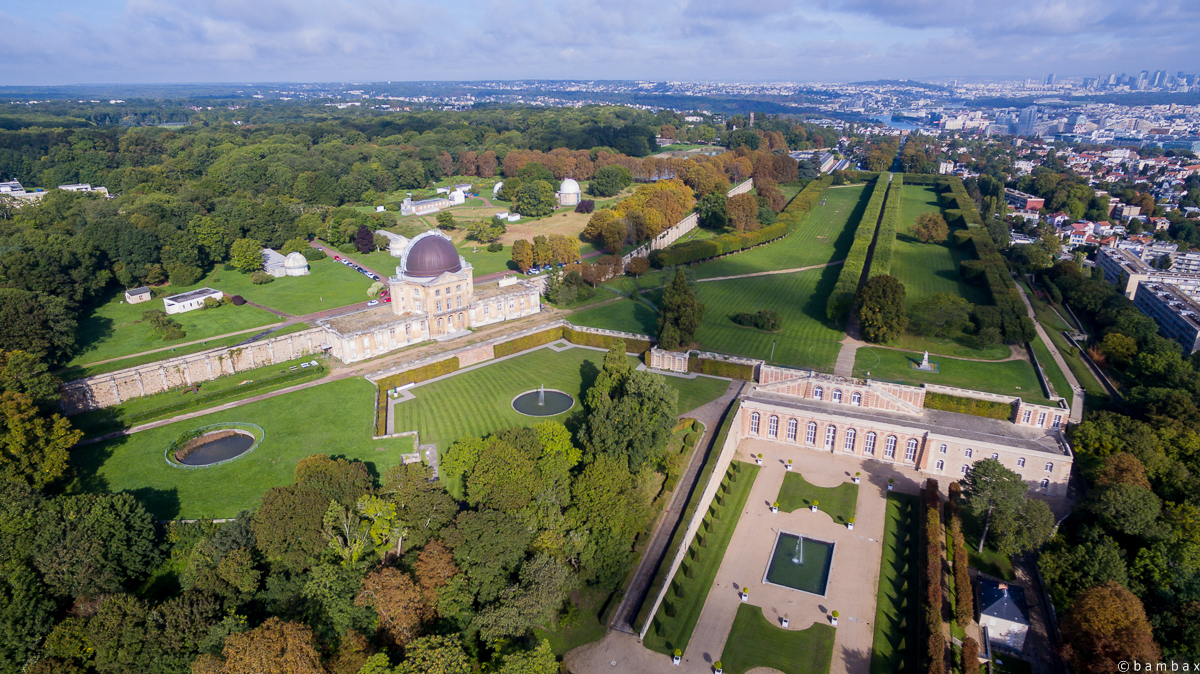
Aerial view of the Orangery and the remains of the Château-Neuf converted to an observatory

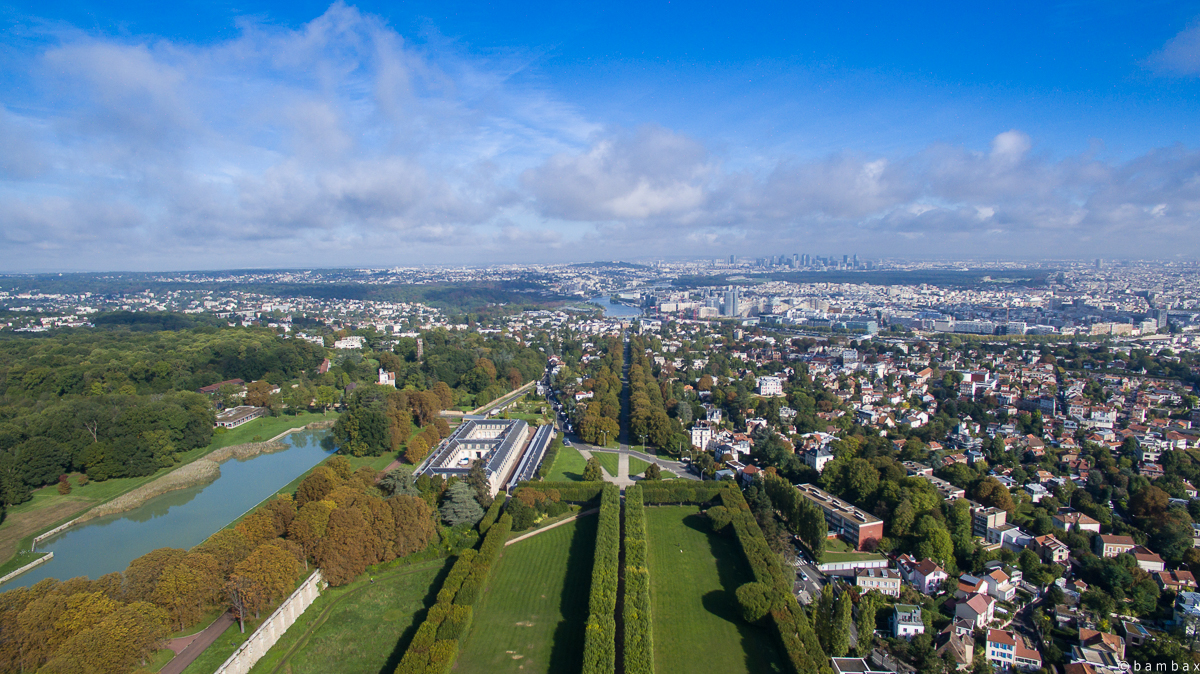
Aerial view of the terrace with the avenue of the château, towards the north

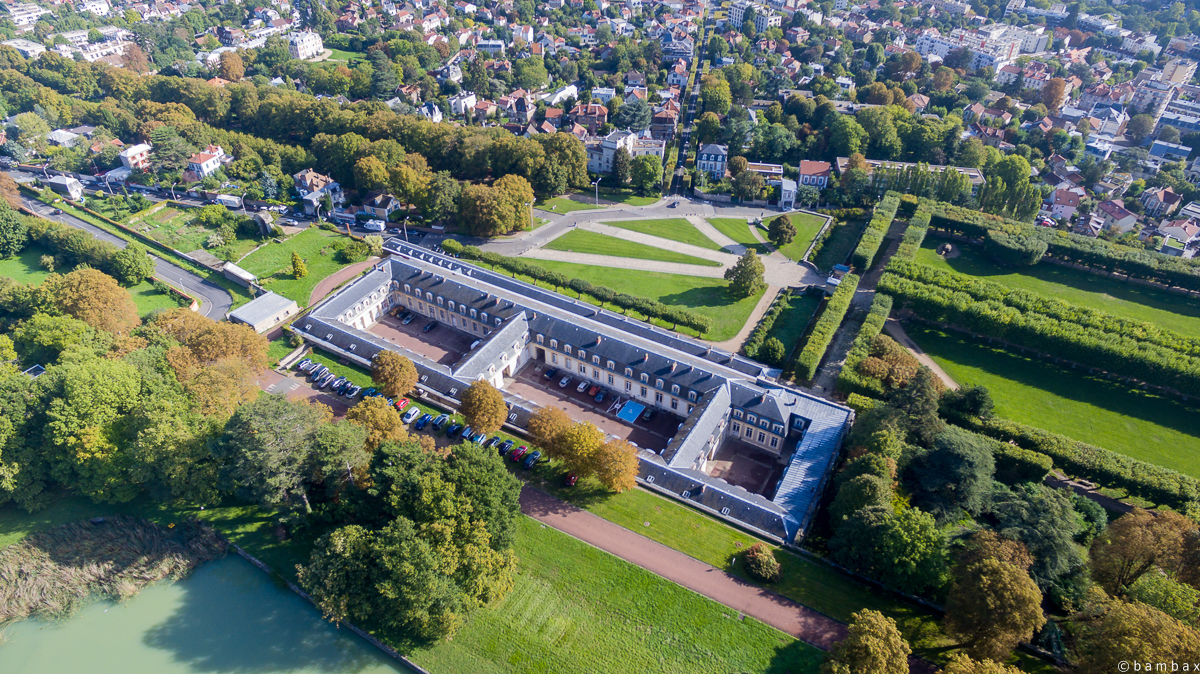
Aerial view of the old stables of Meudon

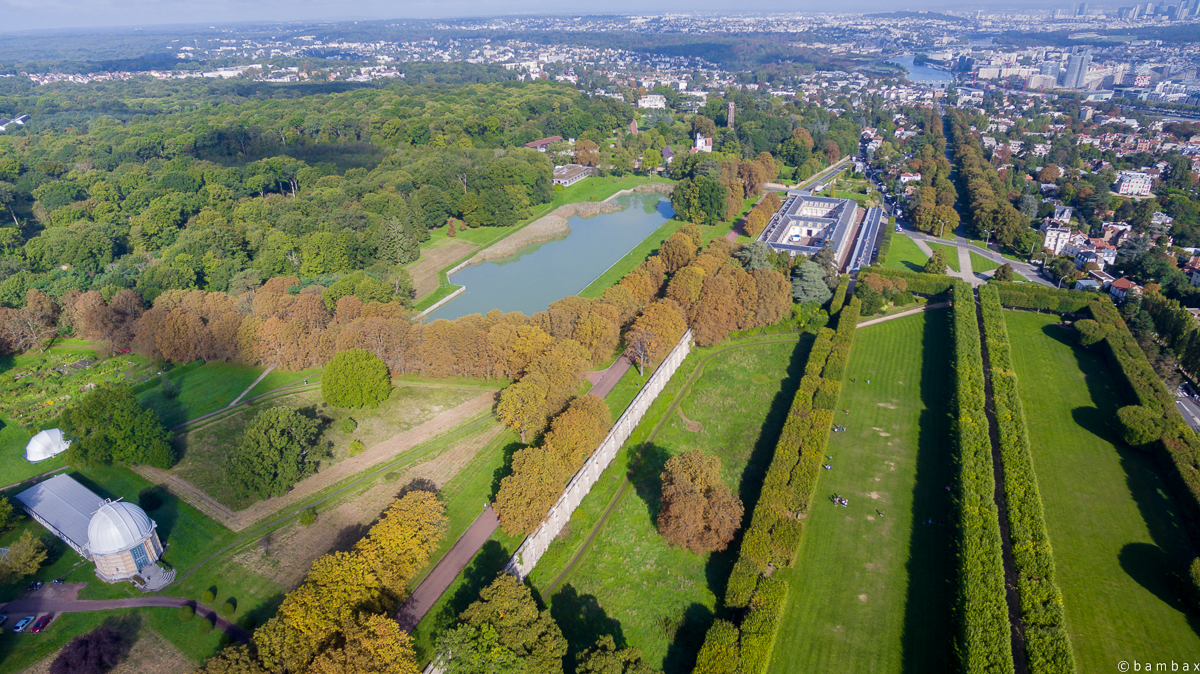
Aerial view of the terrace at Meudon, with the Bel Air pond

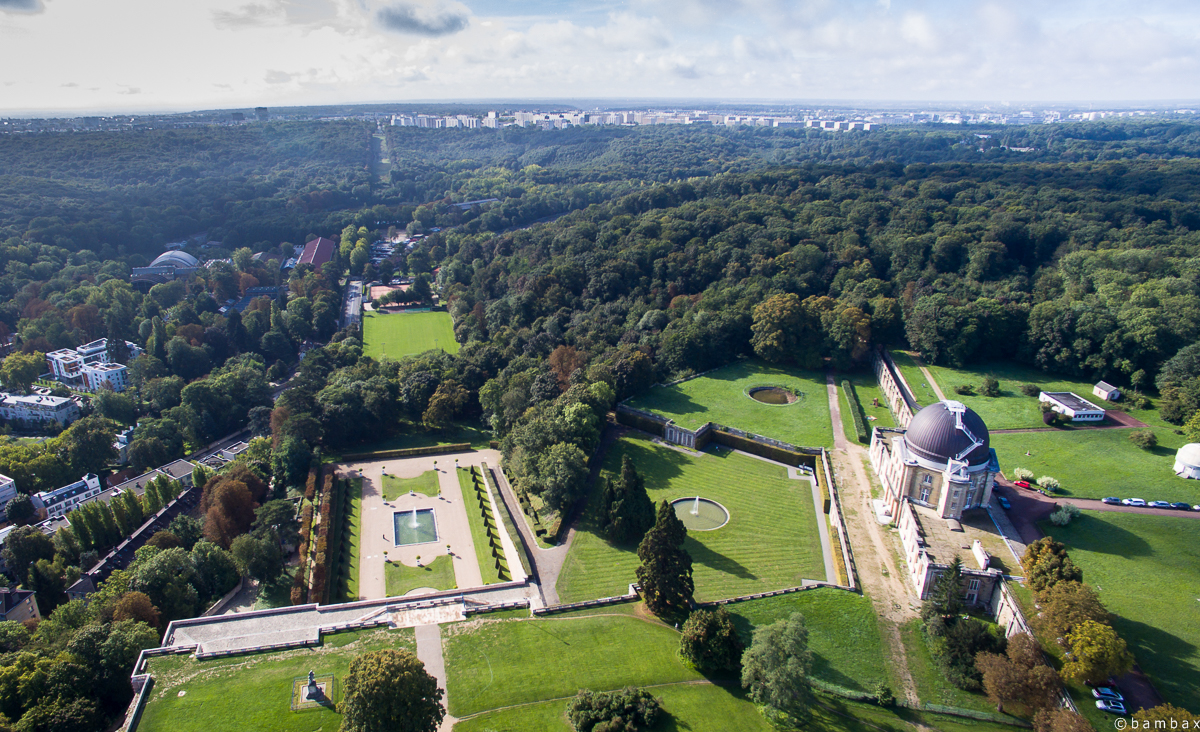
Aerial view of the Grande Perspective towards the south

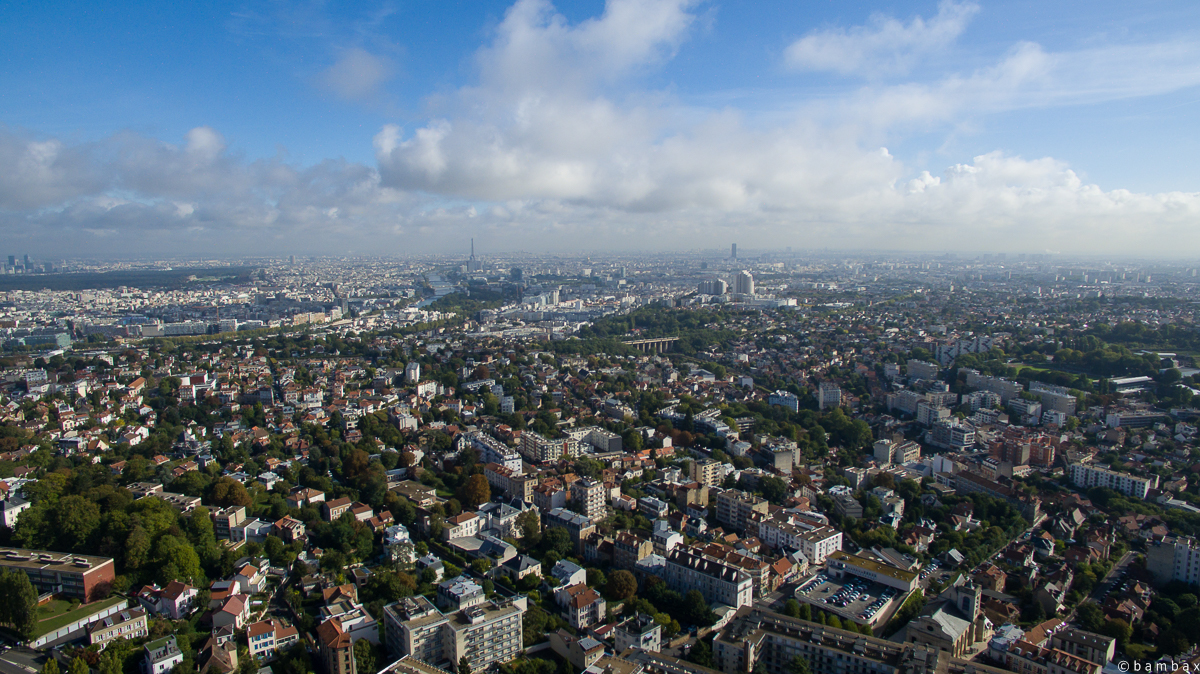
Aerial view of Paris from Meudon

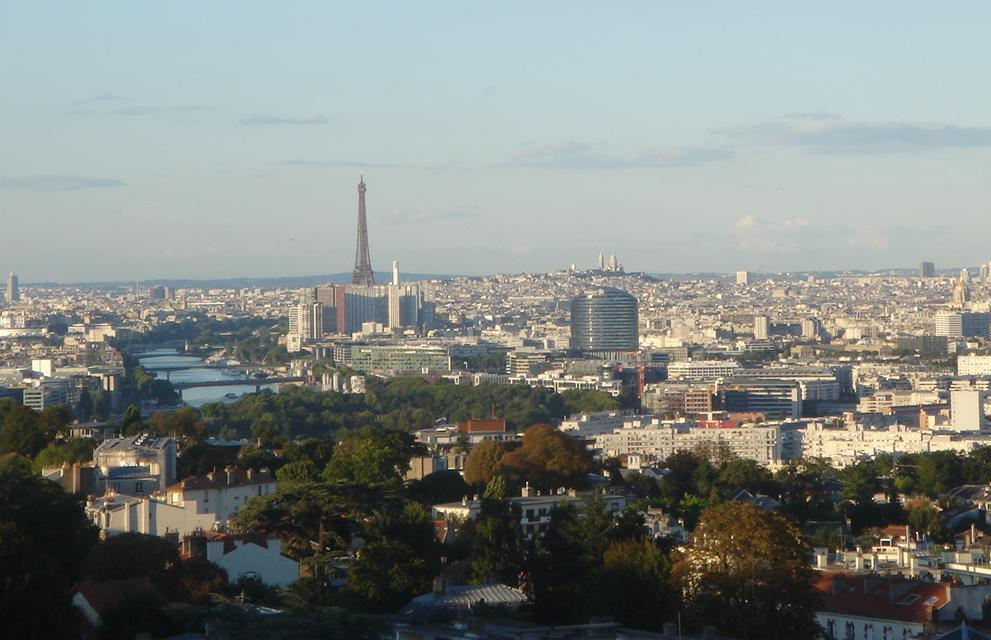
View of Paris from Meudon, 2013

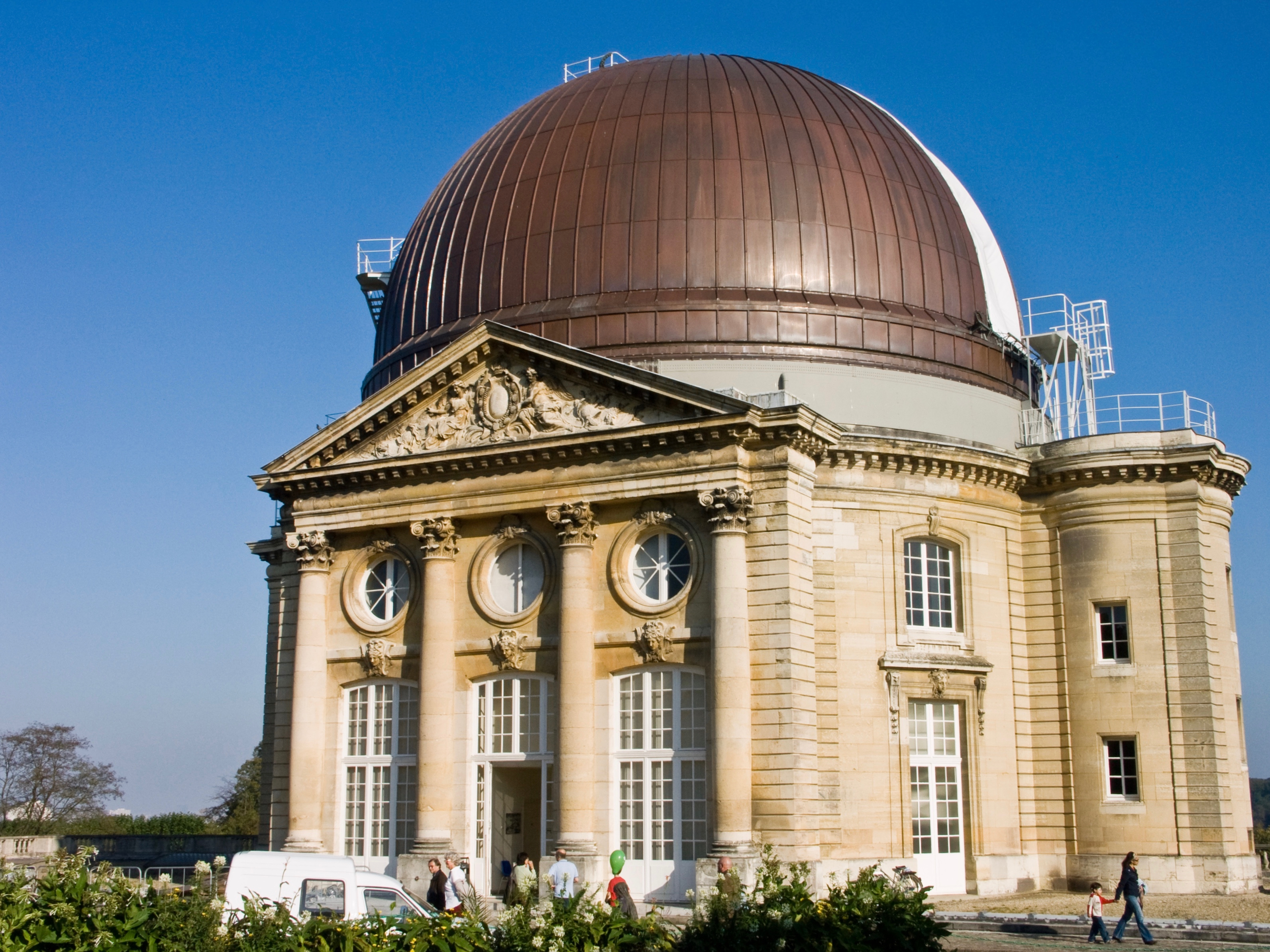
Great dome of the observatory, built on the remains of the Château-Neuf

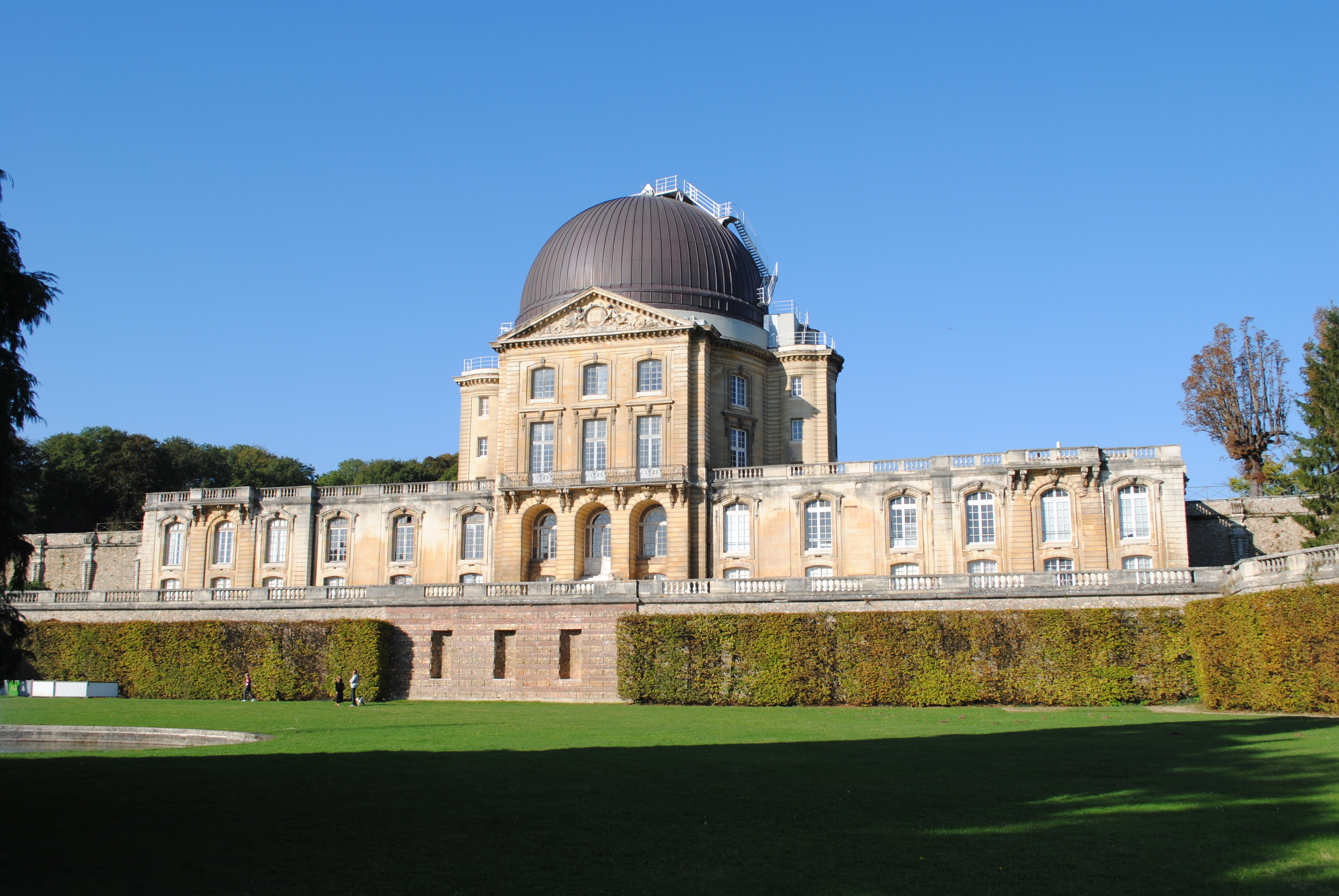
Remains of the Château-Neuf, converted to an observatory. 2014

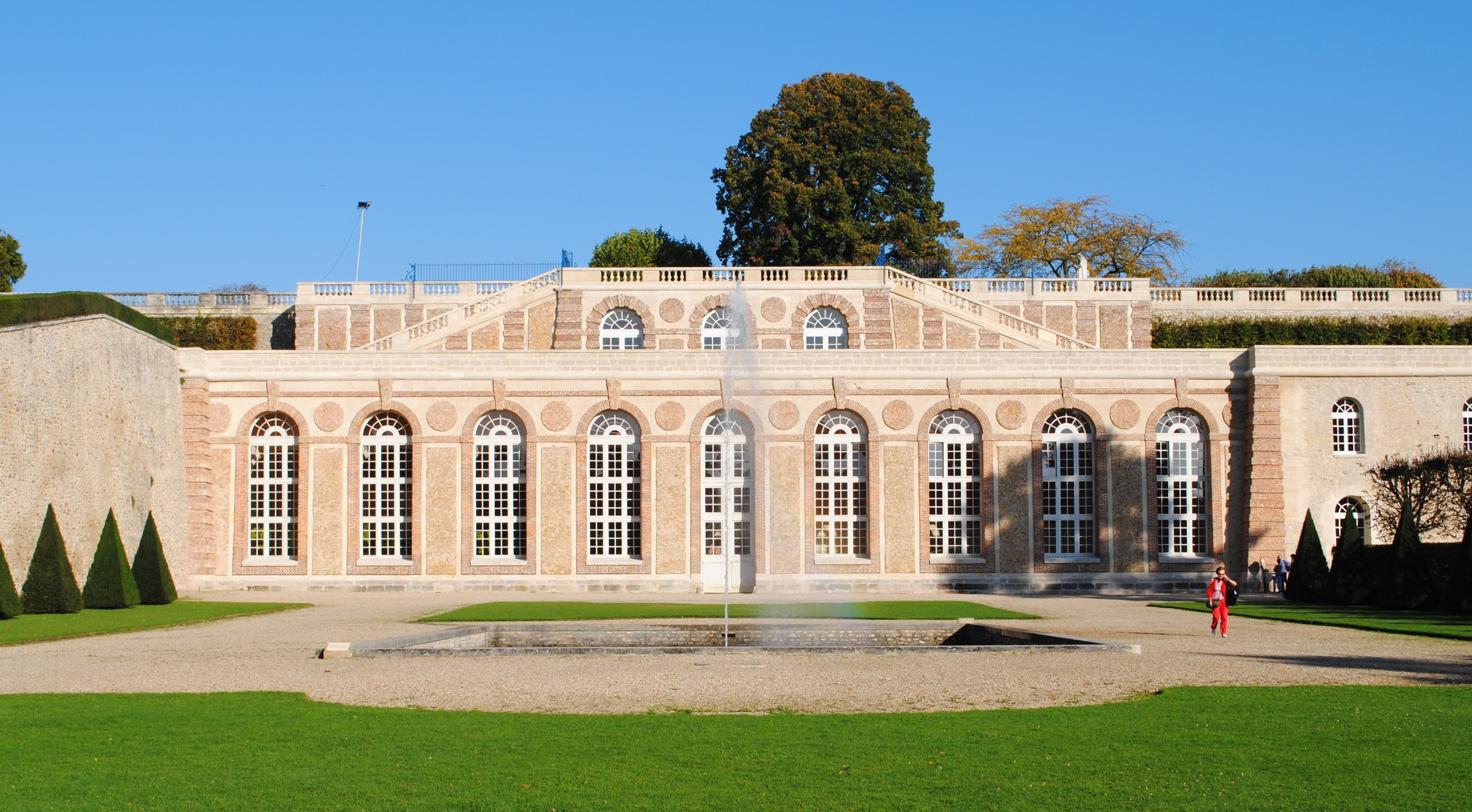
Orangerie de Meudon, 17th century, restored in 2012

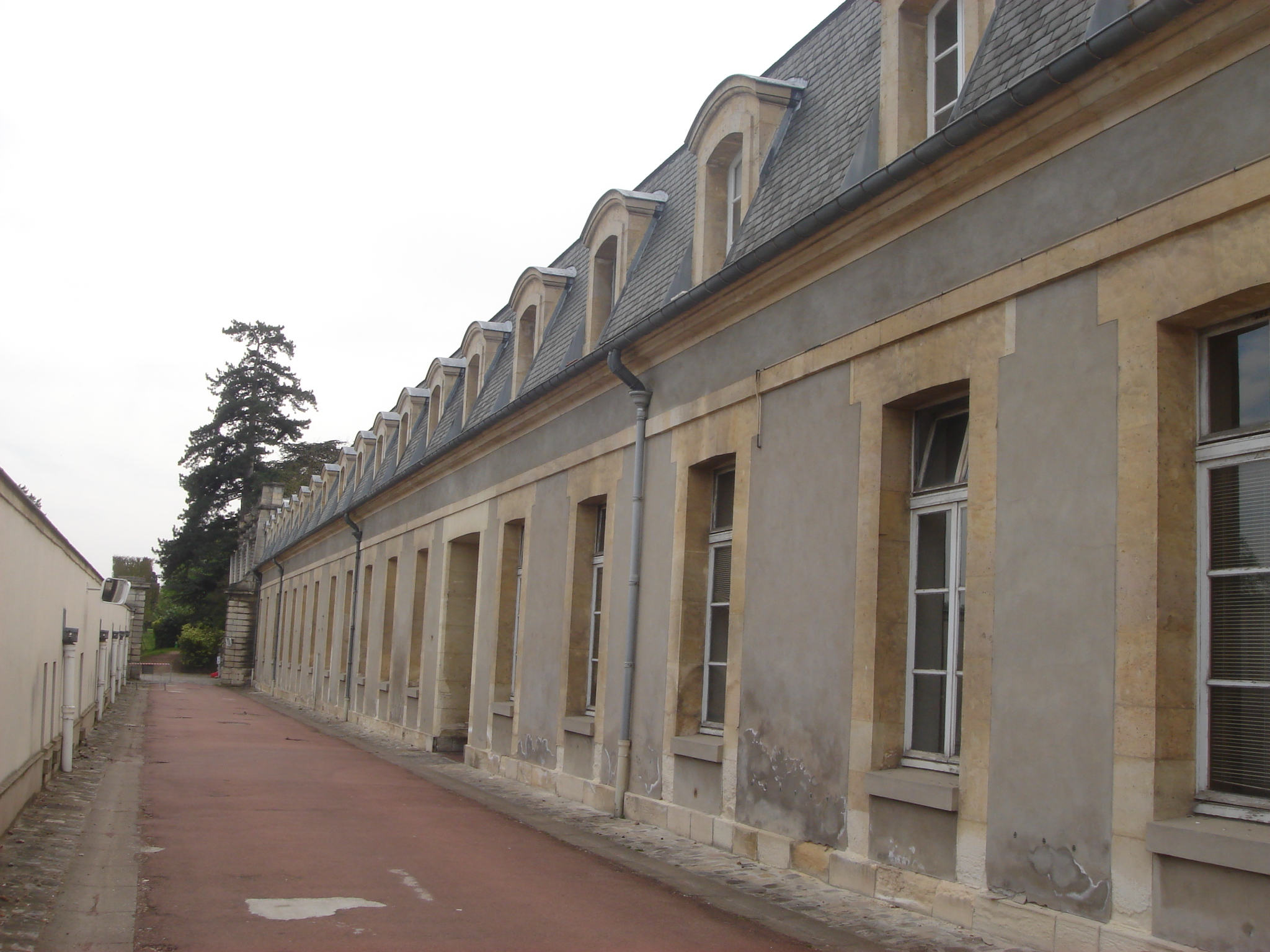
View of the commons of the château. 2009

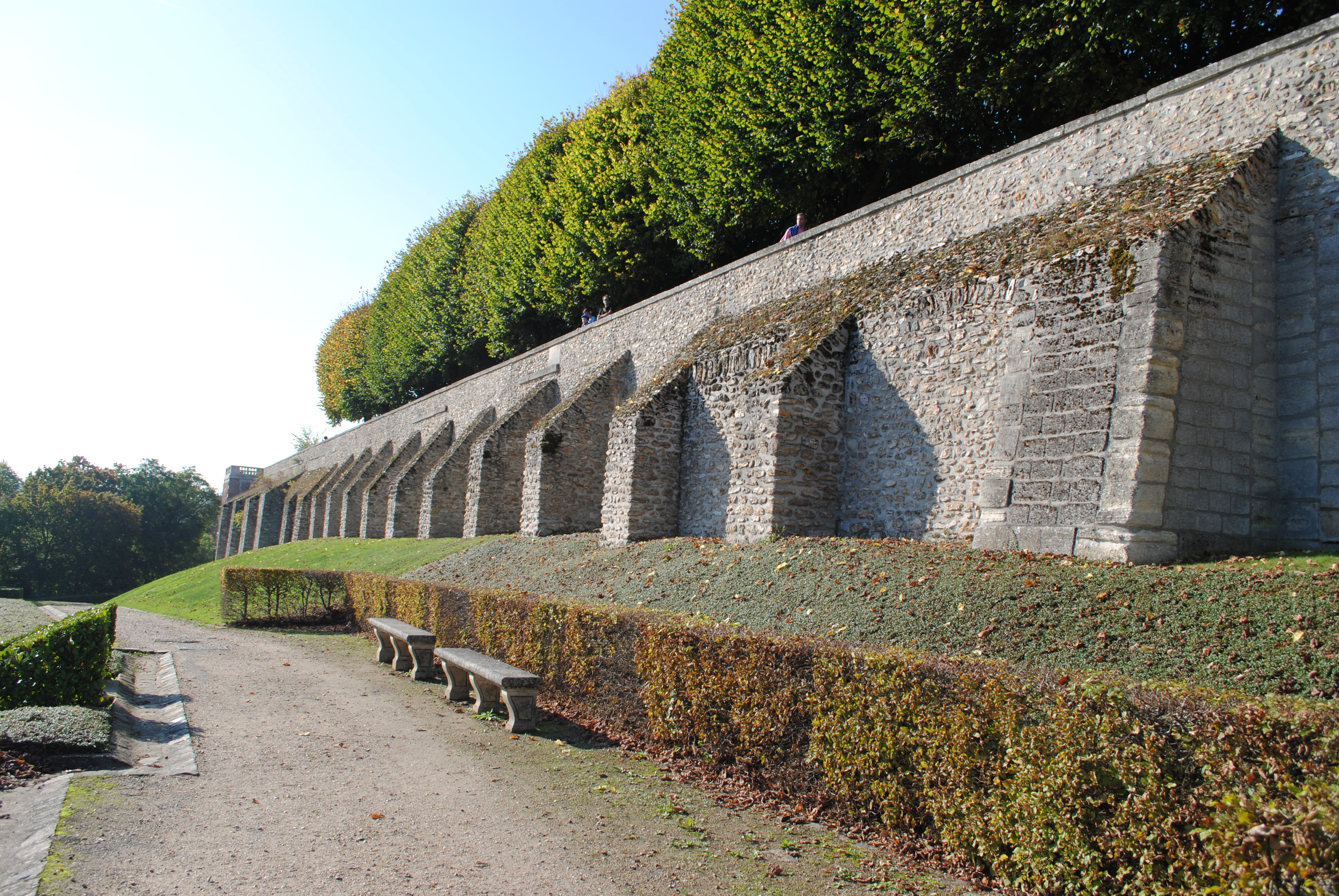
contreforts of the terrace of the old parterre of the château de Meudon, 2013

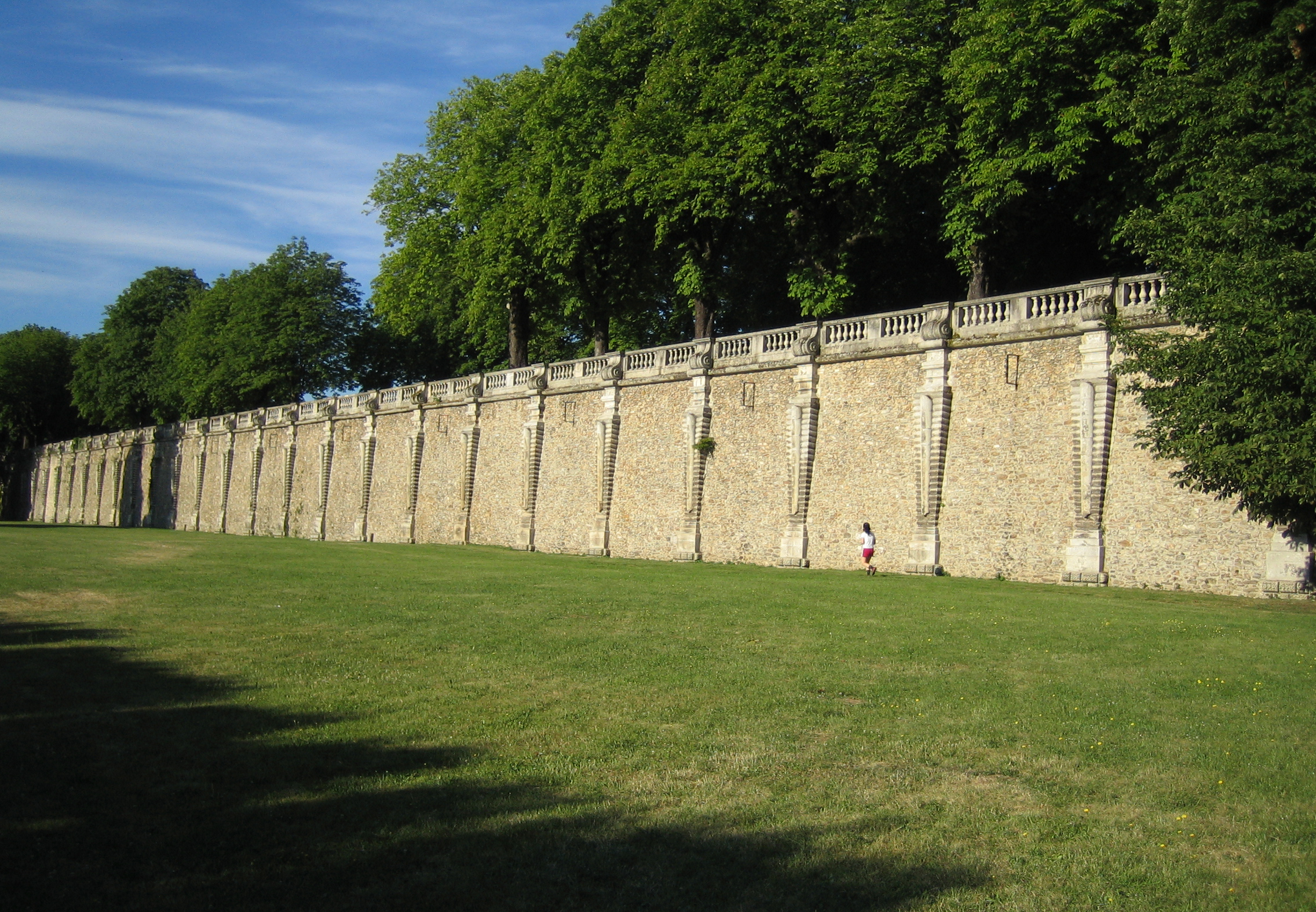
High terrace today

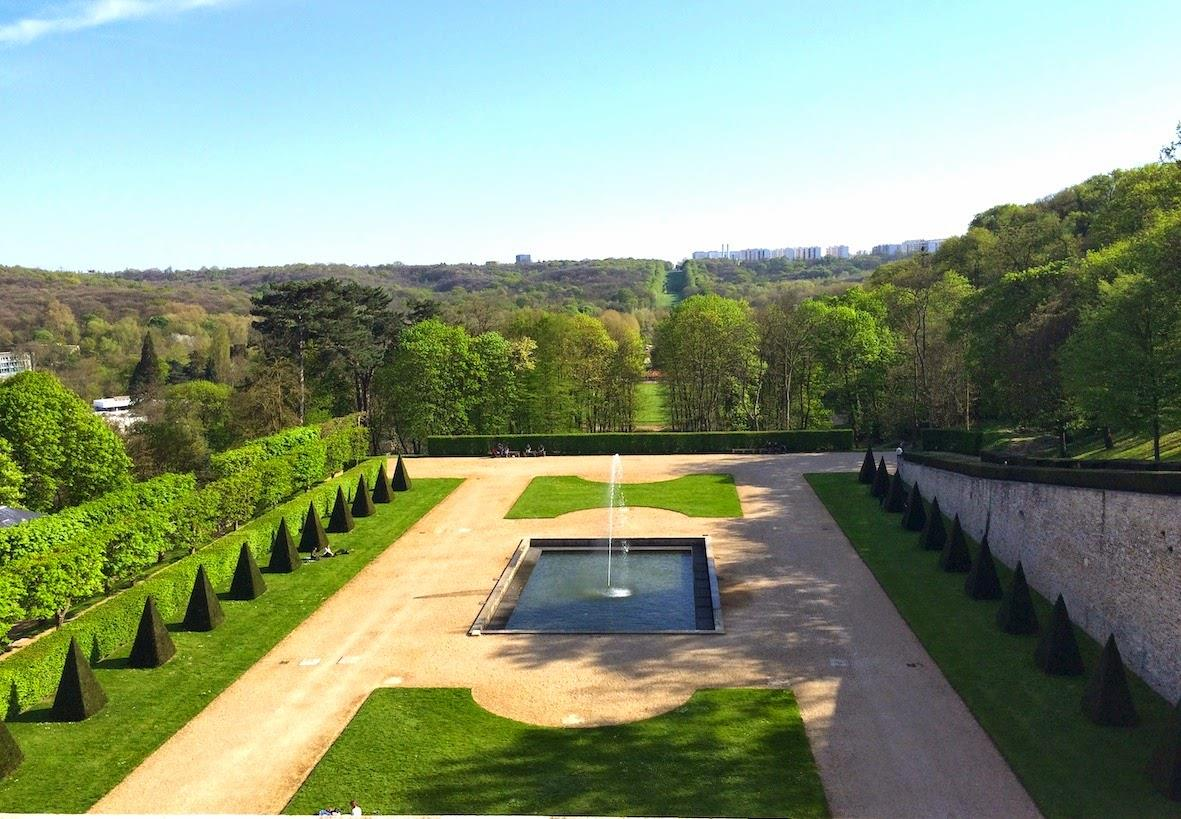
Grande Perspective at Meudon, condition in 2010

Bel Air pond today

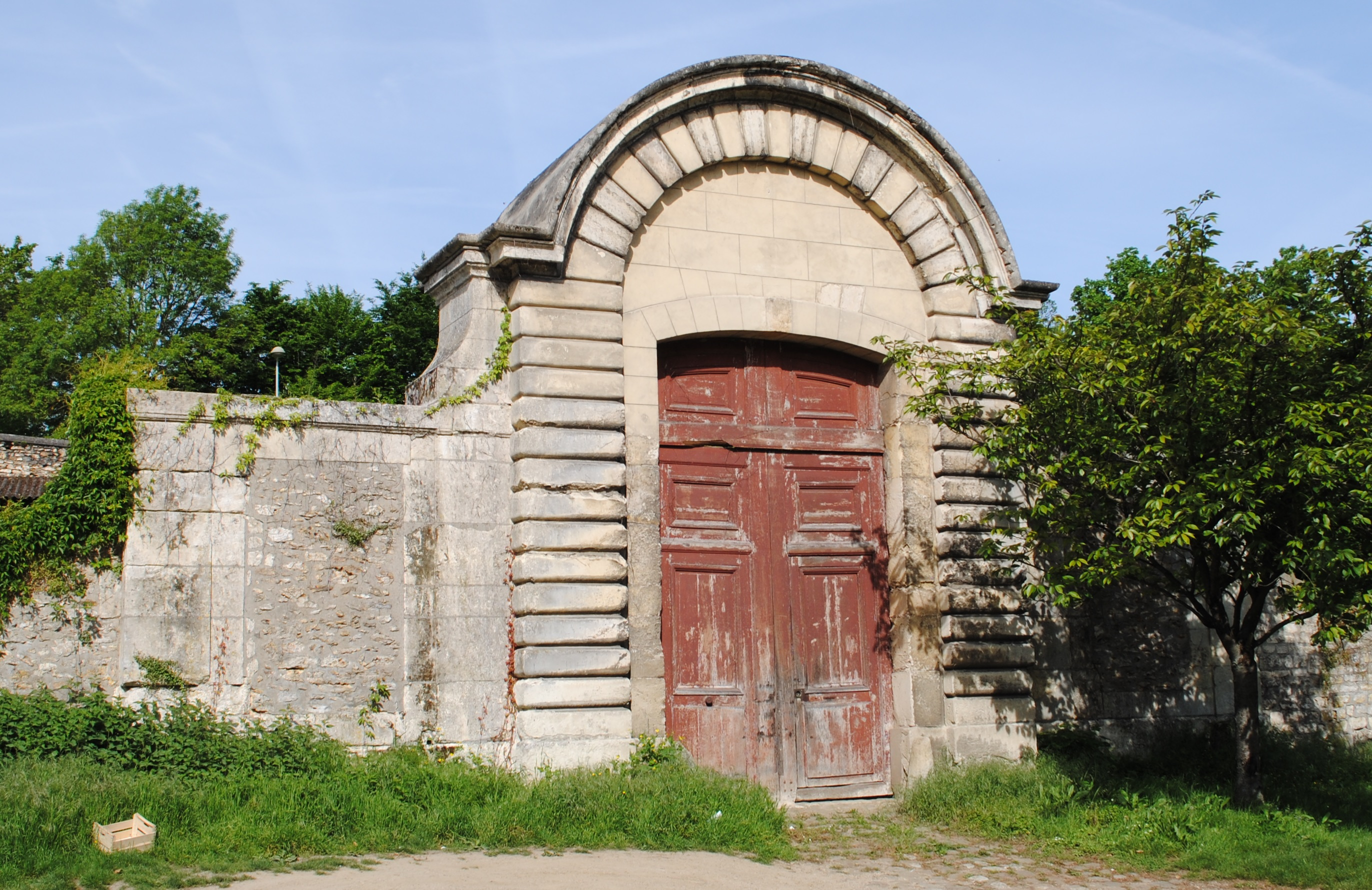
Porte dauphine, 1703, before the Grande Perspective, today.

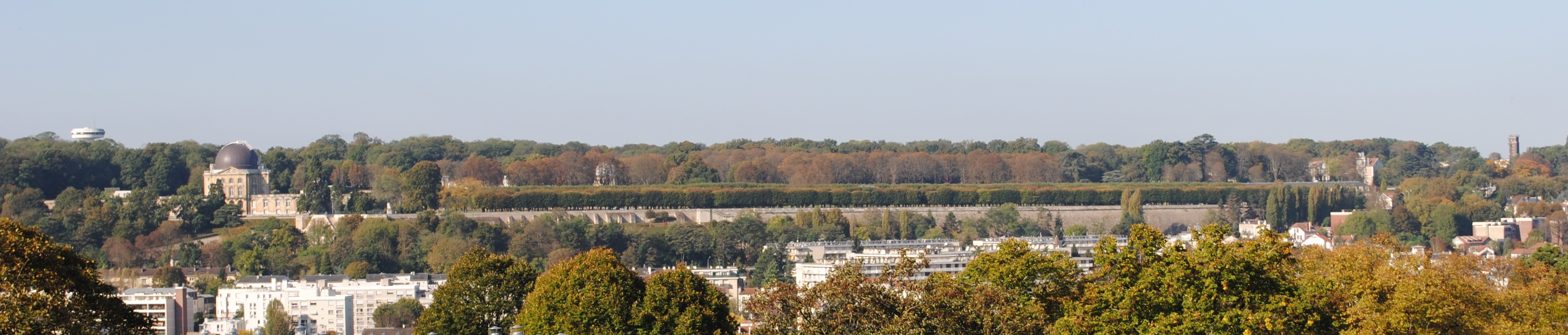
Panoramic view of the Grande Terrasse at Meudon, 2013

==== Legal status: a divided and partly inaccessible space ====
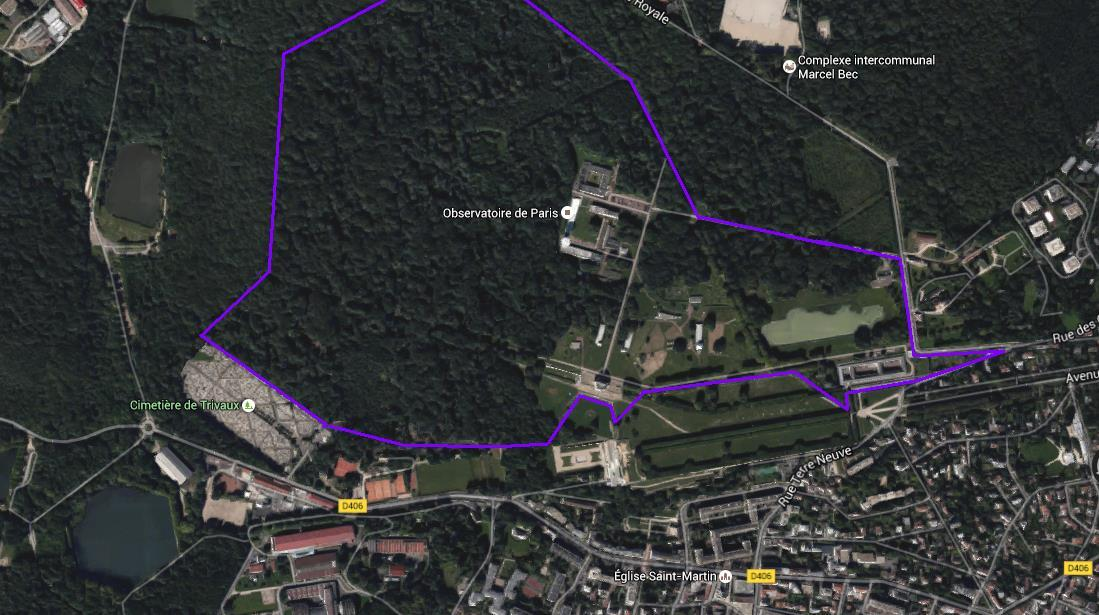
Schéma showing areas closed to the general public, coming under the Observatoire de Paris.

Today, the domain of Meudon is divided in two parts.

The lower part: The large terrace and the orangery are managed by the city and are freely accessible to the public.

The upper part: The Observatory (Chateau-Neuf), the high gardens, as well as the communes situated at the entrance, come under the Ministry of National Education and are assigned to the Observatory of Paris. They are closed to the public.

The State still owns the entire estate, both the part assigned to the Observatory and that which is managed by the city government.

However, as regards the part of the domain accessible to the public, the State has signed a management agreement for the national domain of Meudon with the town of Meudon, which now manages it. Financially, the State still plays its role as owner and manages the pruning and maintenance work. It leaves it to the City to manage the site located within its territory.

==== The rehabilitation project of the Great Perspective ====
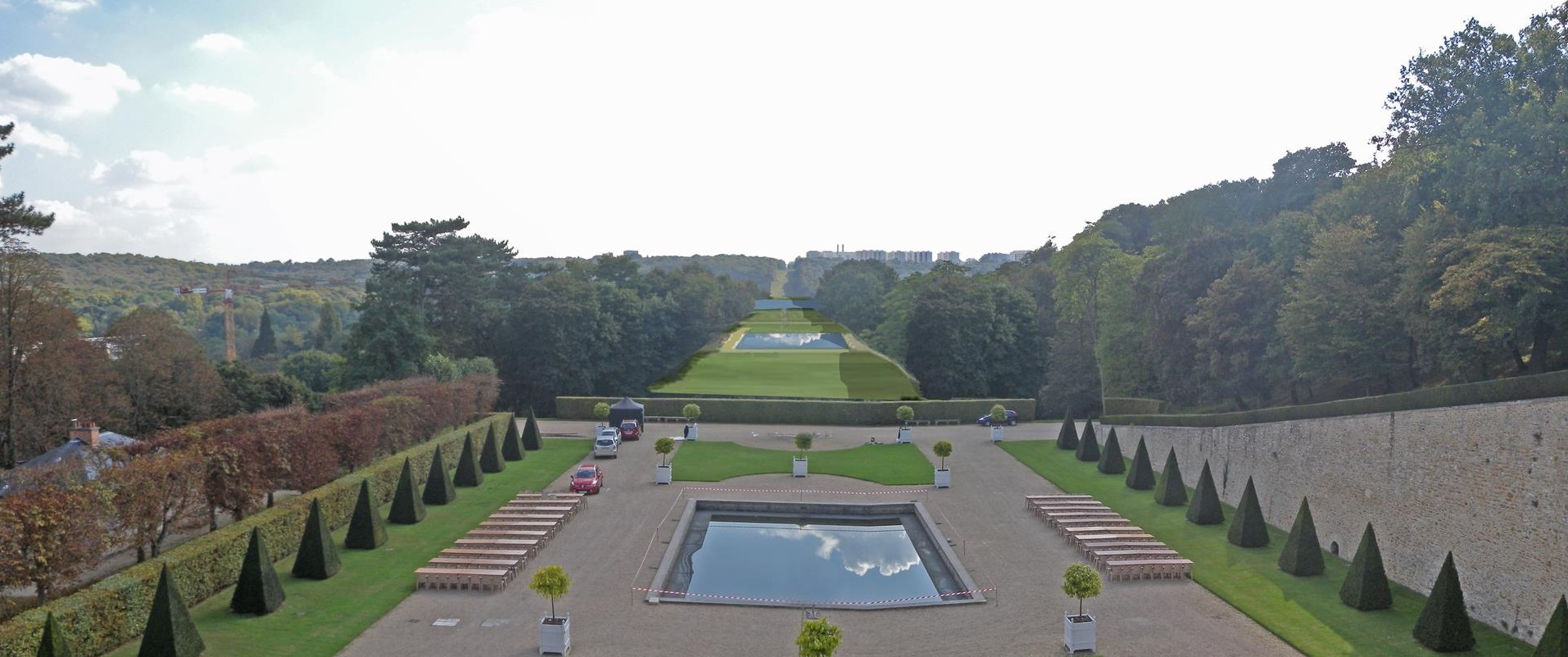
Photographic recreation of the Grande Perspective at Meudon, facing south. 2015. Today this perspective is blocked from the formal garden in the foreground to the pond visible here in the background.

The project to reconstitute the Great Perspective of Meudon was launched as early as the 1980s, but has made little progress to date. Nevertheless, it continues, in consultation with the parties concerned. Indeed, three quarters of this major landscape axis of Ile-de-France, by André Le Nôtre, are preserved. Only the part between the orangery gardens and the Chalais Pond remains blocked.

==== Archaeological potential ====
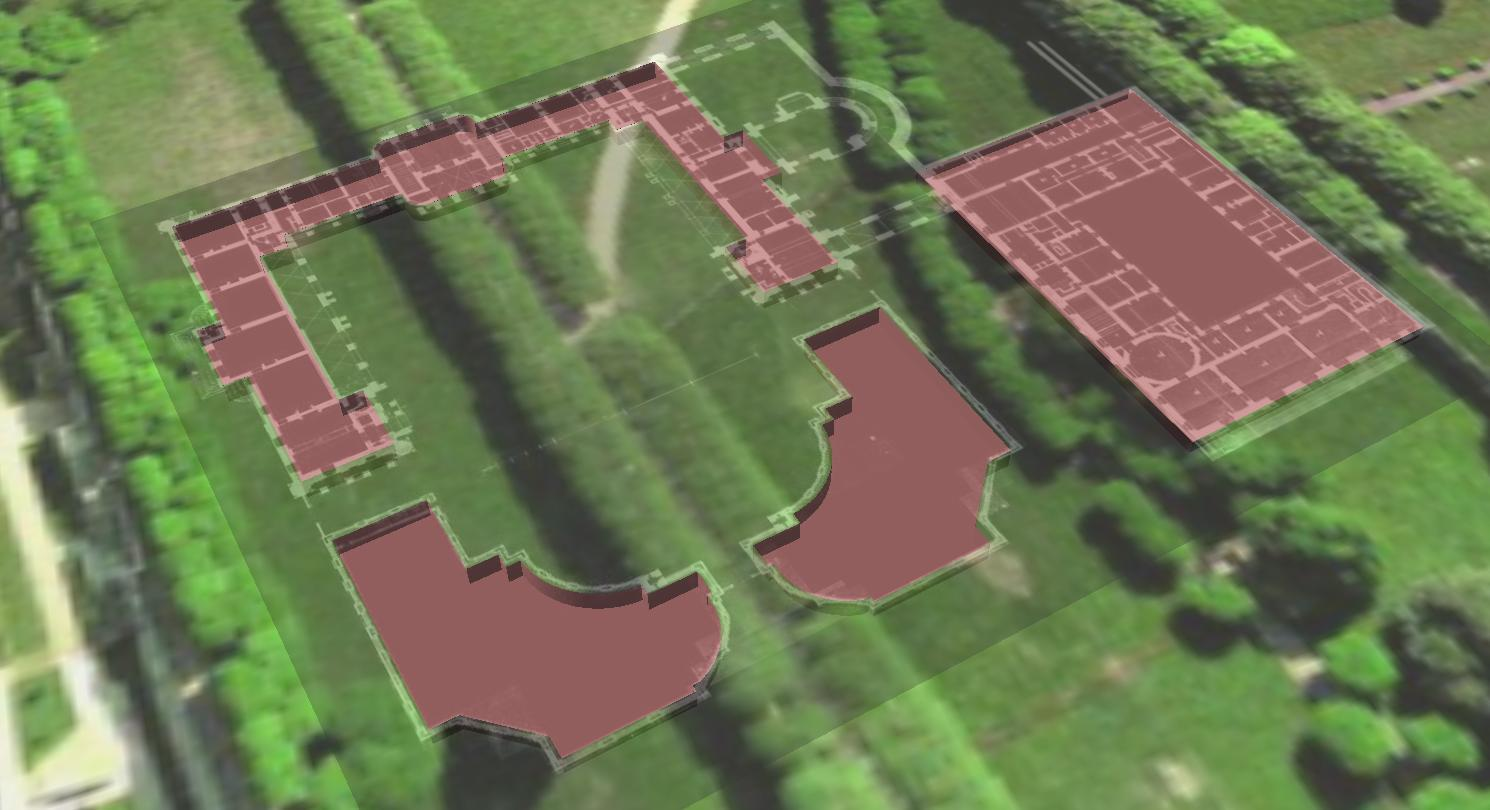
Map of the archeological ruins at Meudon.

No excavation has ever been undertaken on the site of the Château-Vieux. However, the demolition records are formal: all the cellars and ditches remain under the current lawn. An archaeological campaign could make it possible to highlight this hidden heritage.

The only unknown parameter is the exact nature of the impact on the subsoil at the Château-Vieux right-of-way during the Prussian occupation in the Franco-Prussian War of 1870. Indeed, The Prussians occupied Meudon, to bombard the capital and monitor operations.

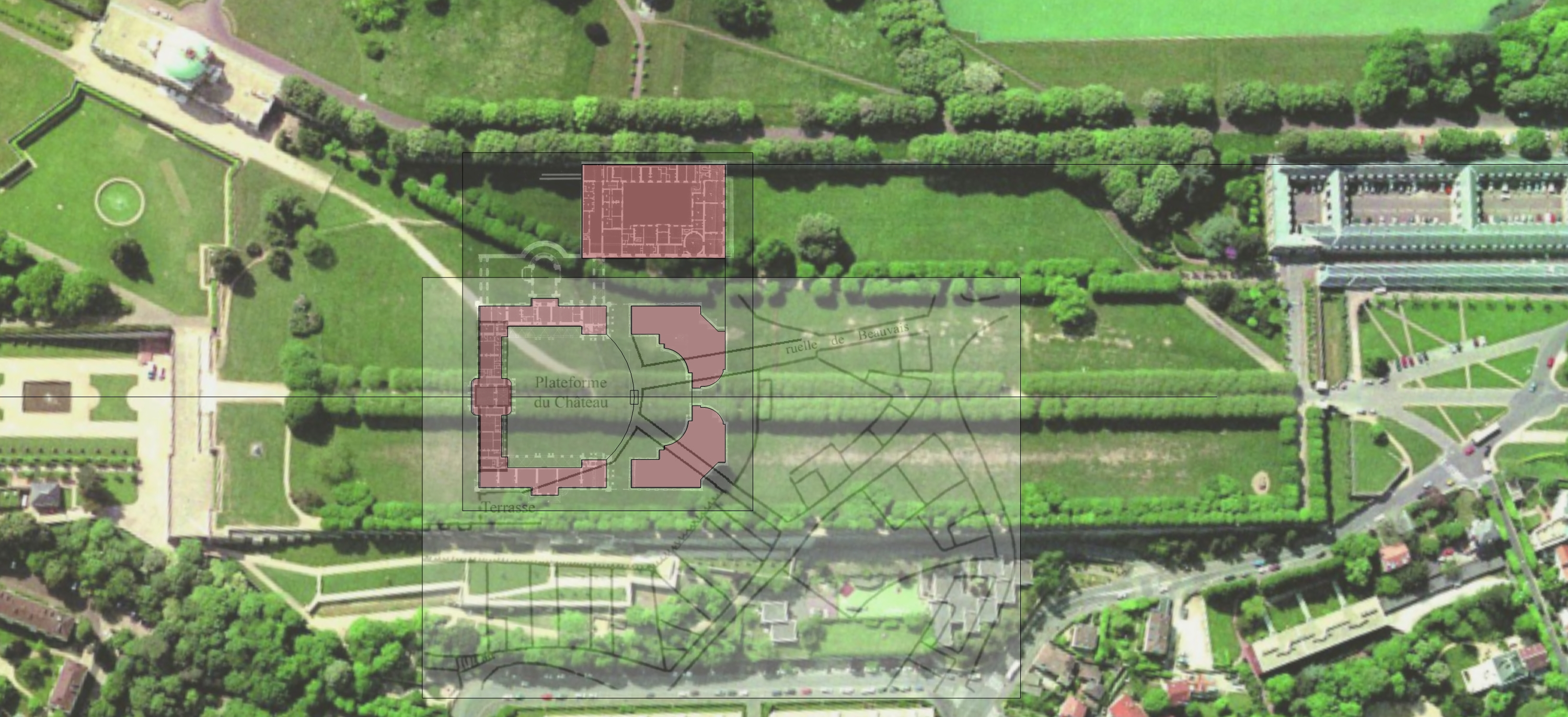
Archeology of the Grande Terrasse at Meudon, with a map of part of the former village, demolished to expand the terrace.

== Detail of the domain ==
=== Vieux-Château ===
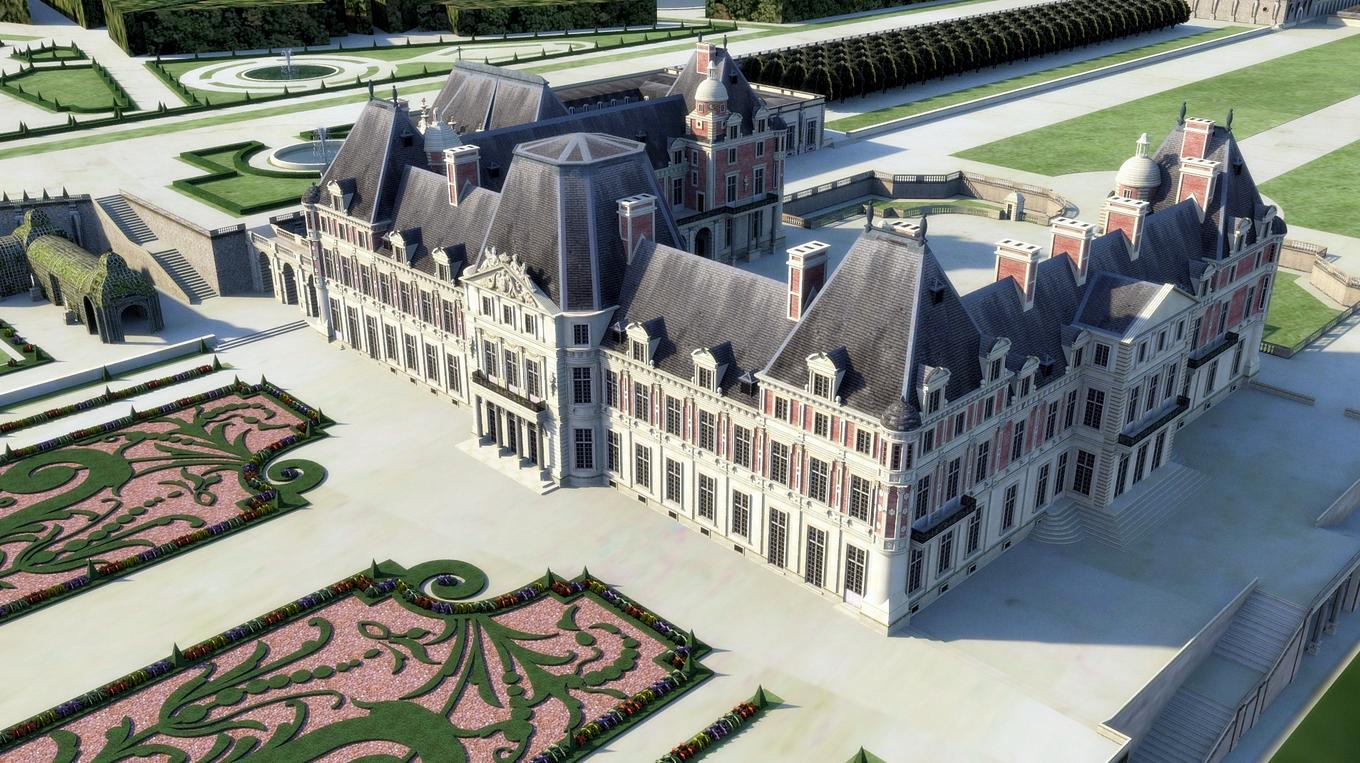
3D rendition of the château-vieux of Meudon at its apogee, circa 1704. Franck Devedjian and Hervé Grégoire, 2012

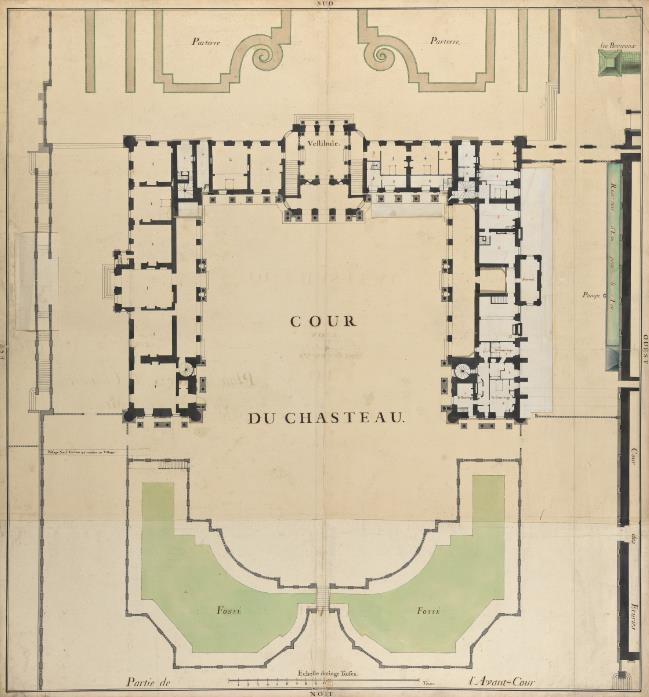
Ground floor of the château-vieux, c. 1700. BNF

The Château-Vieux was the central building of the estate, and the first historical castle at Meudon. It aligned with the Grand Perspective.

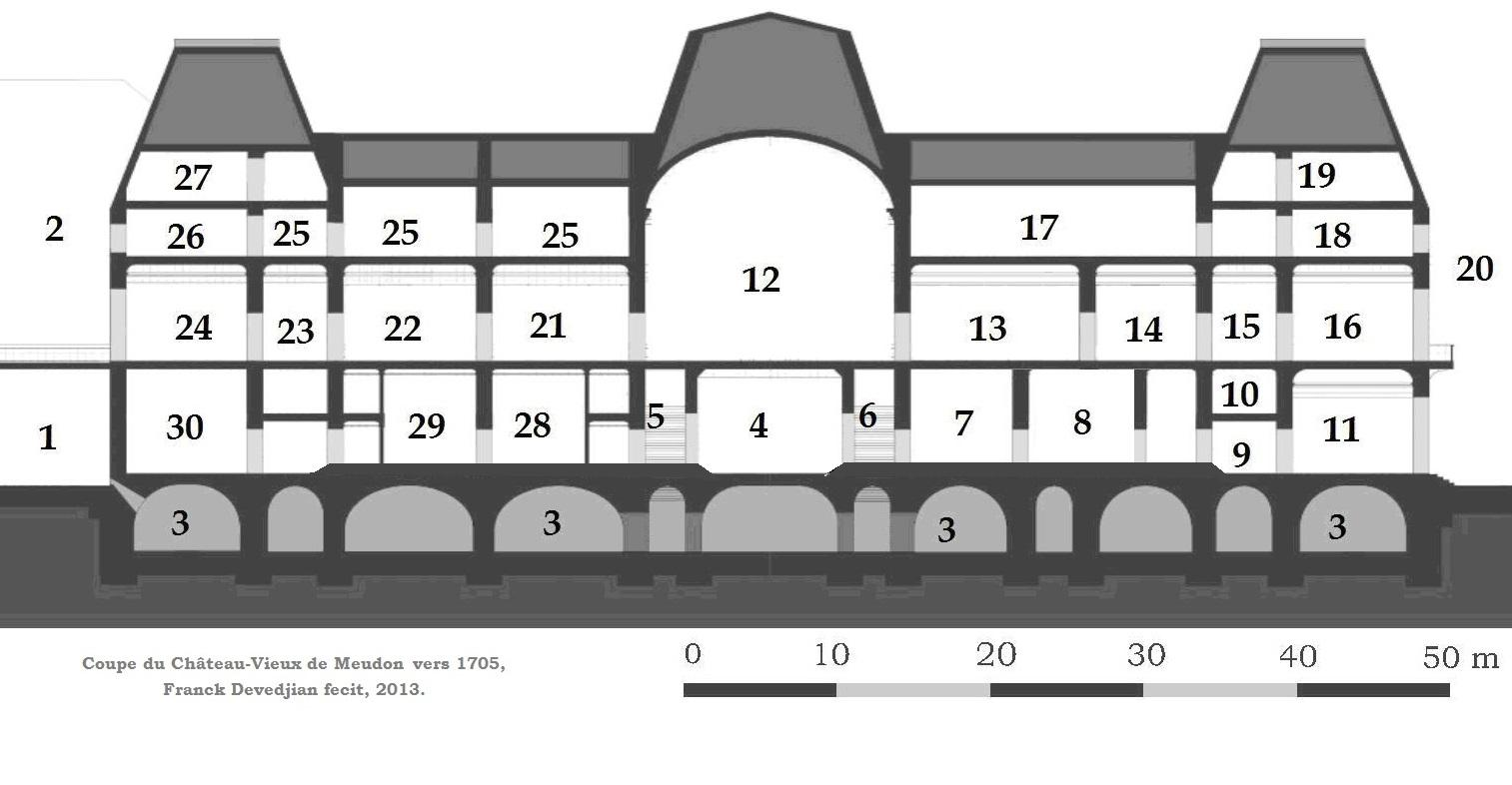
Château-Vieux around 1705. Legend: 1.Small Bridge 2. Chapel 3.Cellars 4.Large hallway 5. West ramp 6. East ramp 7. Apartment of the Duke of Burgundy 8. Apartment of the Duchess of Burgundy 9. Monseigneur's wardrobe 10. Mezzanine of Monseigneur 11. Cabinet of Monseigneur 12. Salon of the Moors 13. Antechamber of Louis XIV 14. Church of Louis XIV 15. Passage 16. Cabinet of the king's mirrors 17. Garde-meuble 1 18. Housing 19. Monseigneur's wardrobe. 20. View of Paris. 21. Games antechamber 22. Gameroom 23. Passage 24. Salon of the Petit Pont 25. Housing 26. Lodging of the first doctor 27. Garde-robe of the king 28, 29 & 30. Dwellings

==== Ground floor ====
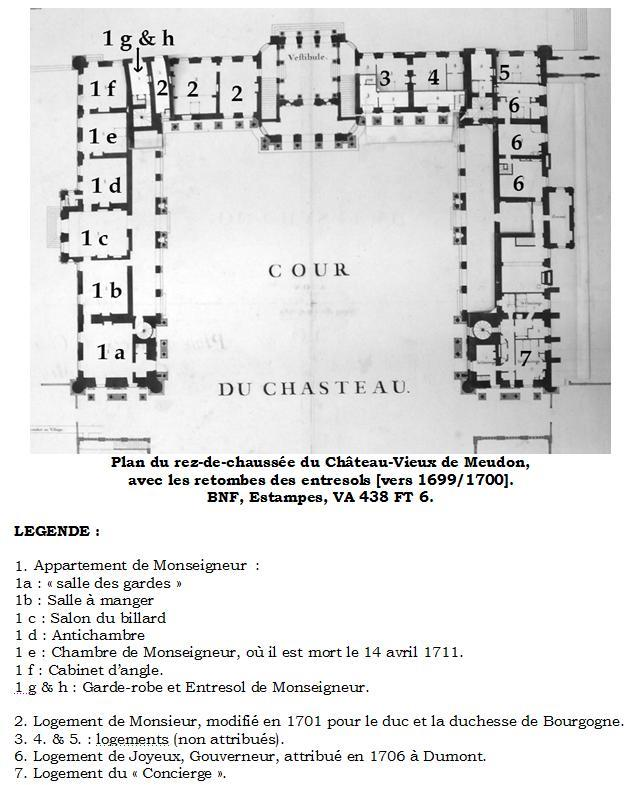
Layout of the ground floor of the Château-Vieux in 1700

===== Grand Vestibule and Great Staircase =====
These rooms were created when Louis Le Vau rebuilt the central pavilion of the castle for Abel Servien between 1655 and 1658.

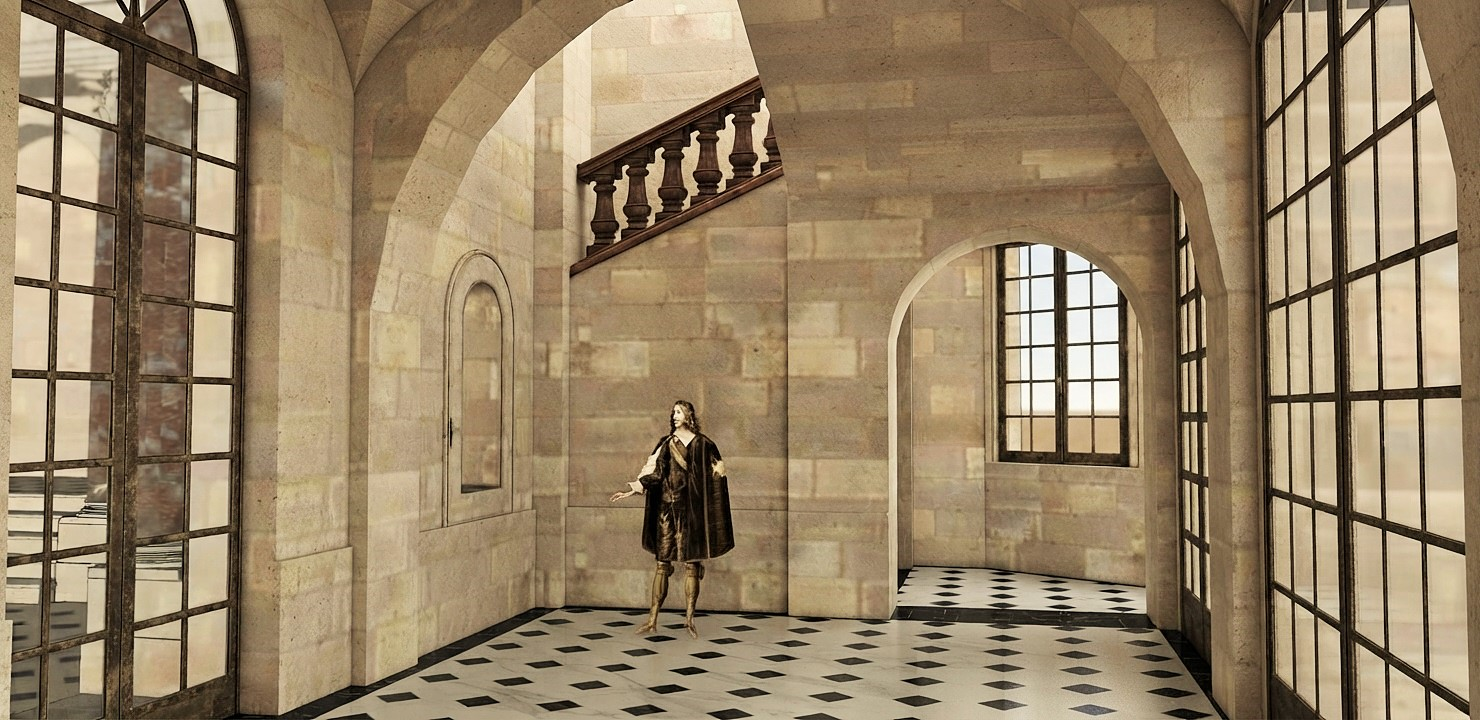
Small vestibule, 1658 to 1803

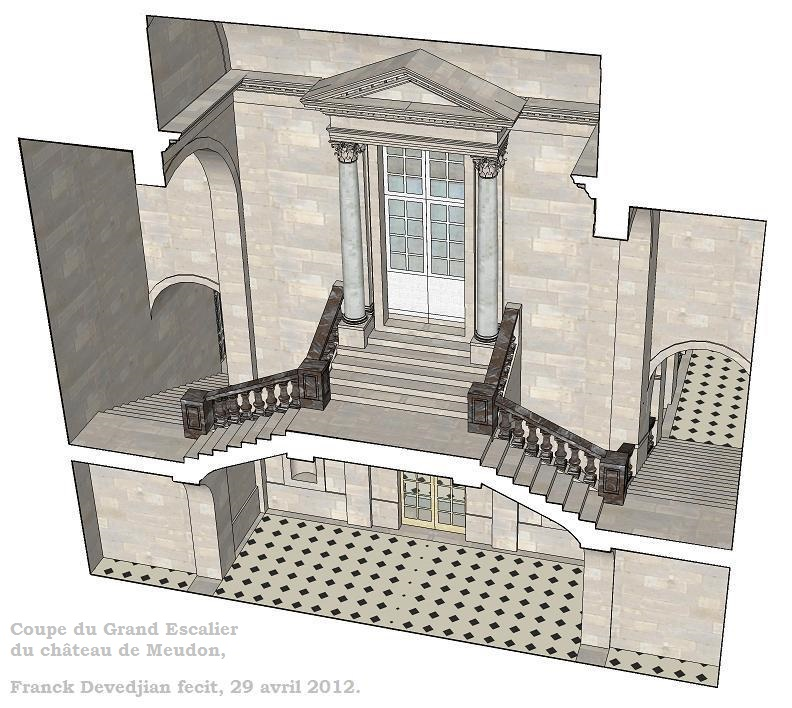
Cross-section of the Grand Escalier (great staircase) 1658 to 1803

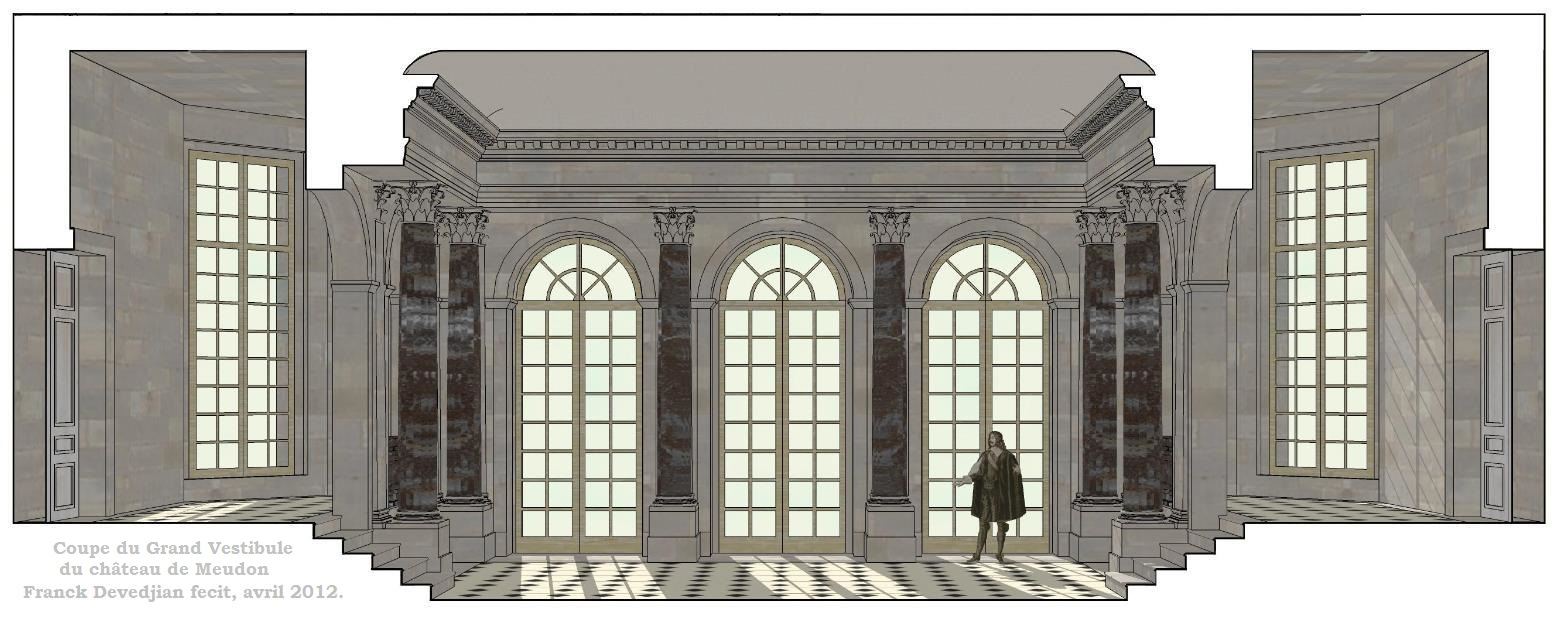
Cross-section of the Grand Vestibule (great vestibule), 1658 to 1803

===== "Grand Apartment" of Monseigneur =====
This was the principal dwelling in Meudon of Louis, Grand Dauphin (1661–1711), son of Louis XIV, on the ground floor of the east wing of the Château-Vieux. It was preserved intact throughout the 18th century.

In its final configuration, beginning in 1701, it was composed successively of:

- Guard room;
- Dining room enlivened by four canvases of Bacchus;
- Billiard room, adorned with four oval canvases of mythological subjects;
- Antechamber;
- Bedroom of the Dauphin, where he died of smallpox on April 14, 1711;
- Corner cabinet;
- Small wooden wardrobe in the Capucine style;
- A small Capucine mezzanine, wooded

====== Guardroom ======
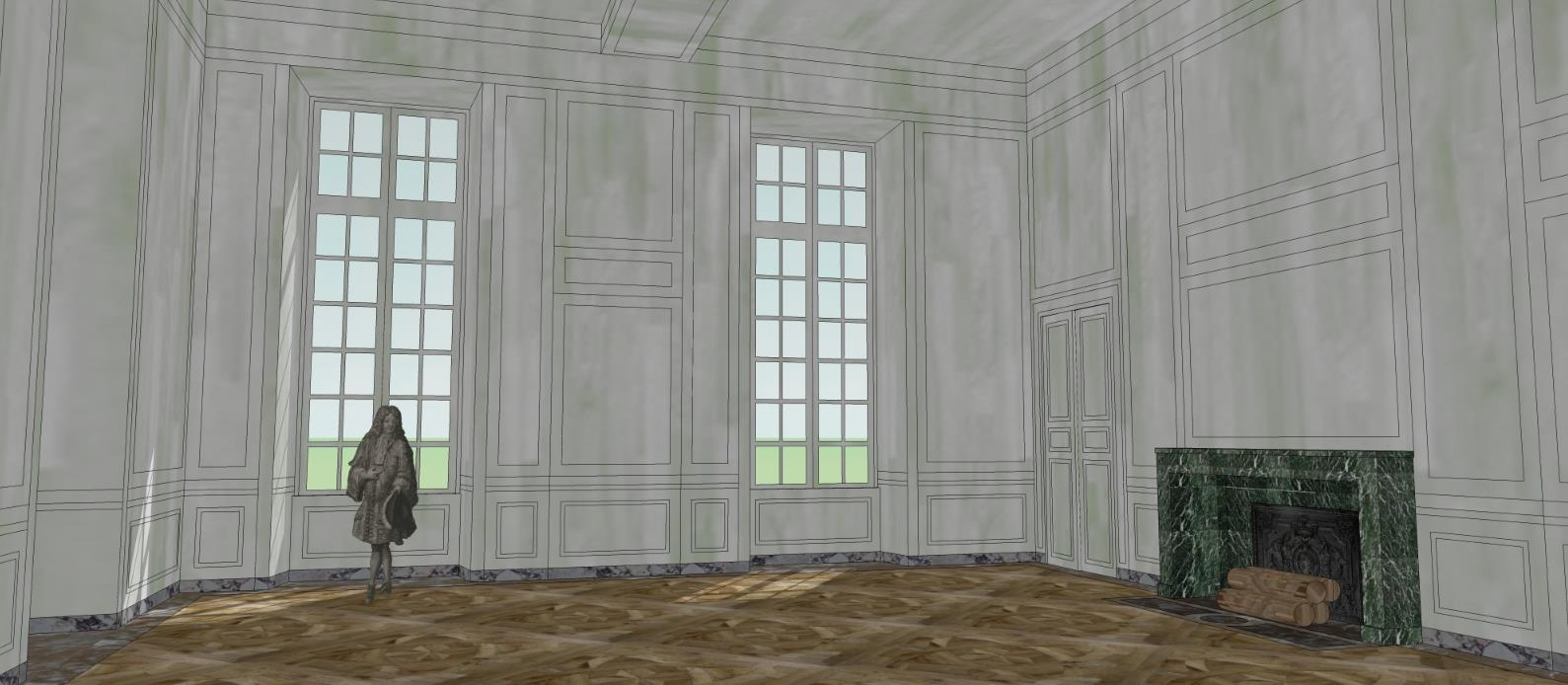
Guardroom of the apartment of Monseigneur in the Château-Vieux of Meudon, circa 1700–1792

Blondel specifies in his Françoise Architecture : "In the House of Guards, in a Royal House, is called a large room where the Guards of the Prince are held, and against the panels of which are attached carabiners, To lay down their arms; They also place in these sorts of places taborets, which are the kinds of tables on which are made the counts, and of which the bottom receives during the day the beds in which the guards rest during the night. These rooms must be spacious, very high, have large chimneys, and be decorated with simplicity. See those of Versailles, of Meudon, of the Chateau des Thuileries ...".

===== Dining room of the Dauphin (from 1700) =====
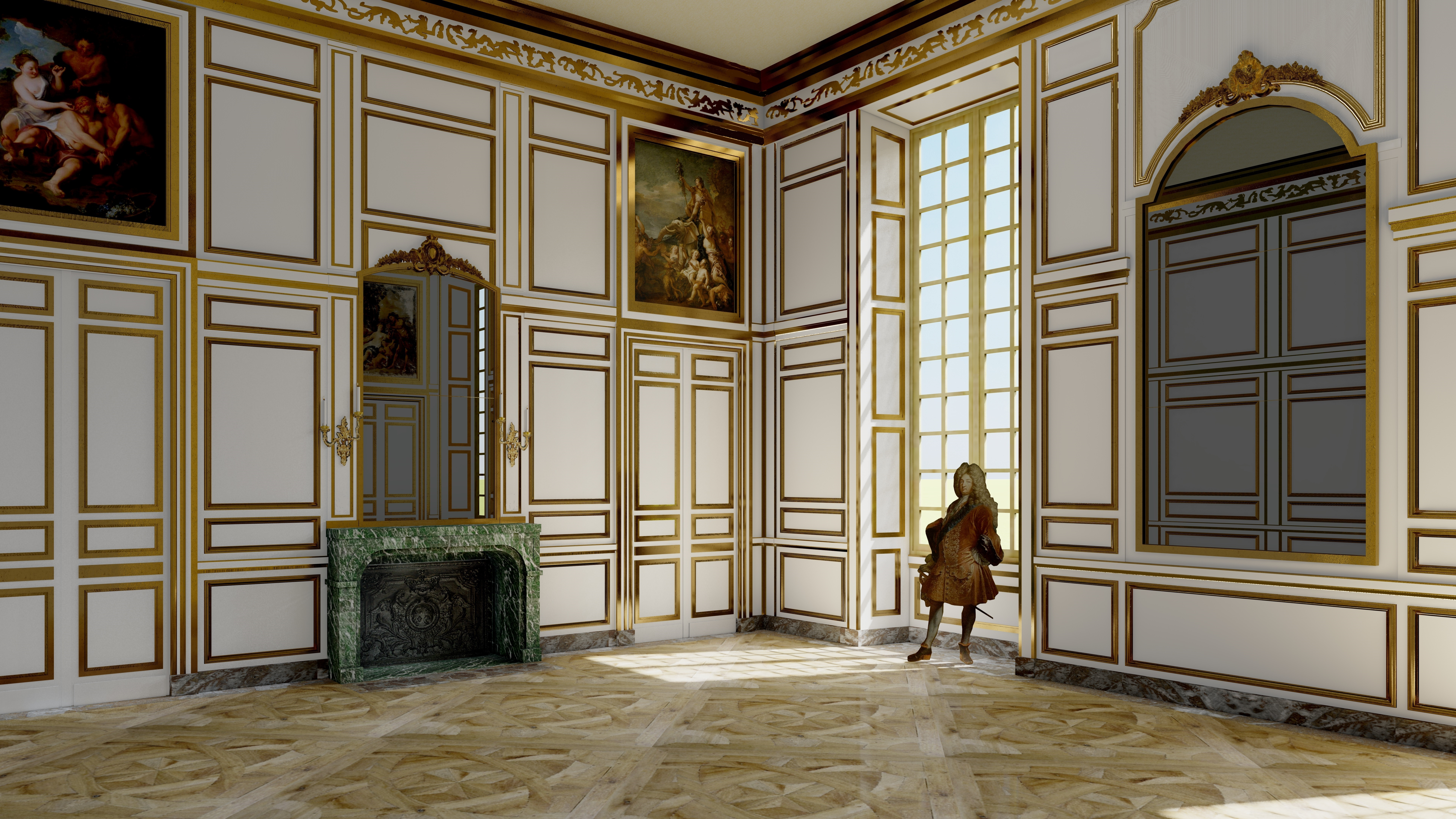
Dining room of Monseigneur, ground floor of the Château-Vieux, east wing, c. 1700–1792

The 1775 inventory indicates that after the additions and other work of 1700, the room was "wooded height of gilded frames, cornice of the same, chimney of Campan green marble ...". In 1700, Monseigneur commissioned four different painters to paint "bacchic" subjects. The same artists then adorned the grand salon of the Château de Marly.

- By Charles de La Fosse (1636–1716):
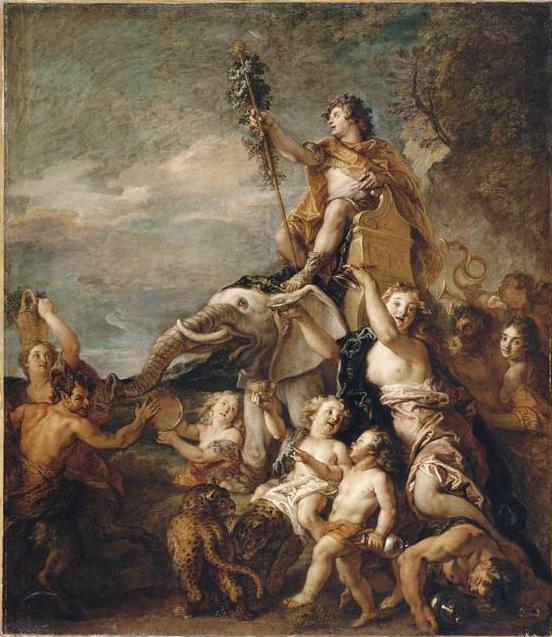
  The triumph of Bacchus, Charles de la Fosse, 1701. Musée du Louvre

The triumph of Bacchus, who is carried on an elephant, with his tyrsus in his right hand, and several Baccantes around him carrying instruments. In the foreground are two children, one mounted on a tiger. On the left one sees Silenus on the reverse.

- By Jean Jouvenet (1644–1717):
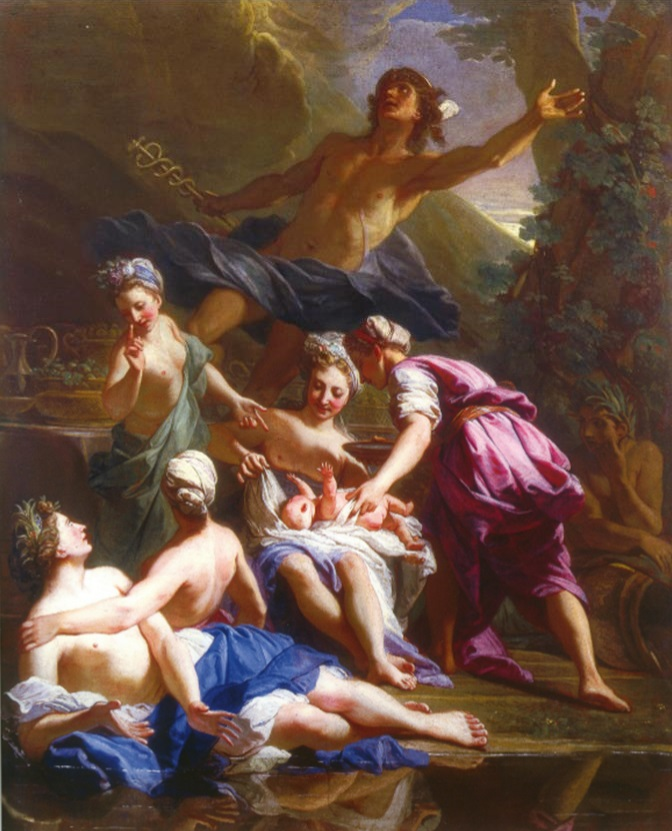
  ‘’The Birth of Bacchus’’, Jean Jouvenet, 1701. Private collection.
  Mercury takes flight after having put Bacchus in the hands of the nymphs. The legend of his mother Semele says she was beloved by Jupiter, and herdownfall by lightning was engineered by Jupiter’s jealous wife Juno.
- By Bon Boullogne (1649–1717):
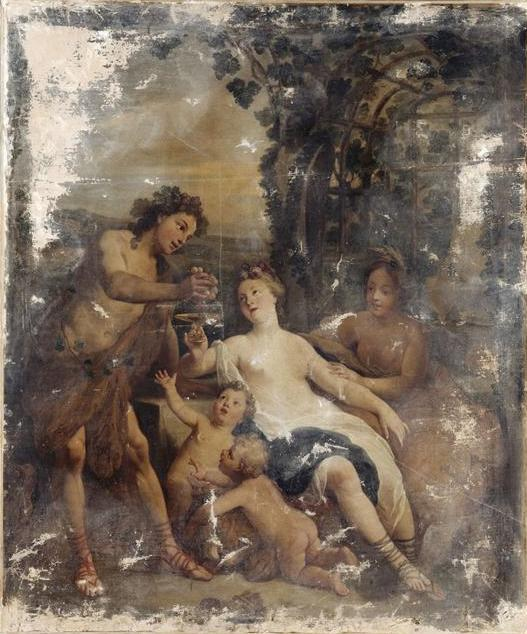
  ‘’Venus, Bacchus and Ceres’’, Bon Boullogne, 1701. Musée du Louvre.
  Venus, Bacchus and Ceres. This painting is preserved in the Louvre, where it is called "Bacchus and Ariane". It is also named in the ancient inventories as ‘’Bacchus and Ariane’’, ‘’Bacchus and Erigone’’ or ‘’Bacchus, Flora and Ceres’’. Sent to the Central Museum at the end of the year II, it lost its attribution but remained at the Louvre, where it was found among the anonymous members of the French school. It is to be restored.
- By Antoine Coypel (1661–1722):
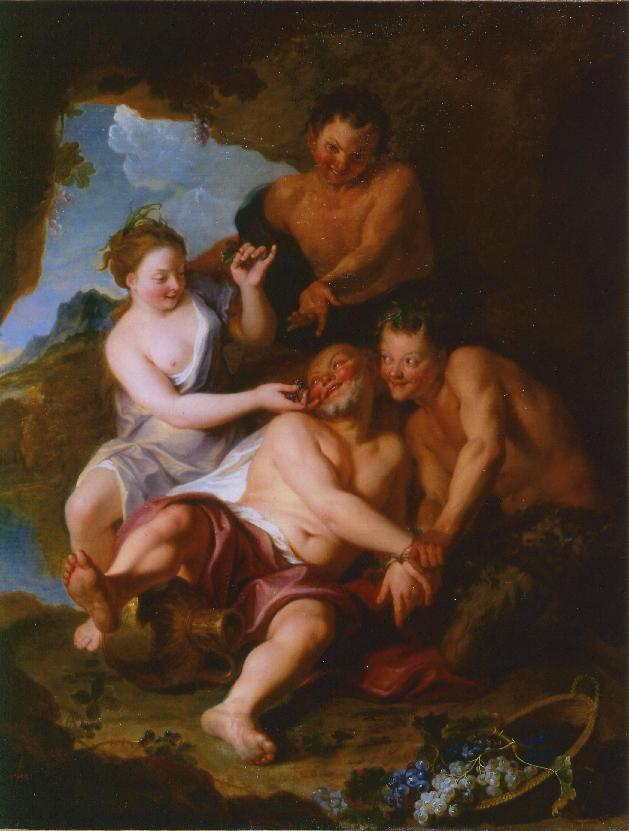
  Silenus smeared with blackberries by the nymph Eglé. Antoine Coypel, 1701. Musée des Beaux-Arts de Reims.
  The theme comes from episode number six of Virgil's ‘’Eclogues’’, entitled "Silenus," in which Virgil writes: "And as the old man opens his eyes, he blushes his forehead and the temples of the juice Bloody of the blackberry." Silenus, asleep in a cave after his usual drinking, is surprised by two satyrs and the nymph Egle, for whom he promised to sing. The two satyrs seized Silenus, whom they bound with ivy, while the beautiful Egle blushed her face with blackberries, which she crushed in order to snatch from her threat the fulfillment of her promise. Measurements: 4 feet 9 inches by 4 feet 1 inches. The picture was substantially cut in the nineteenth century. It is preserved in the Museum of Fine Arts of Reims

Billiard room

Beginning in 1700, the old staircase by Louvois and Jules Hardouin Mansart was demolished to create a series of rooms that included the "salon du billard". The 1775 inventory says that the room is "wooded of height, with gilded frames, gilded cornices, chimney of gryot marble".

Monseigneur ordered for this room a series of paintings above the doors, all of them oval and of the same size:

- By Charles de La Fosse: Hercules between Vice and Virtue: Height 4 ft 10in; L. 3 ft 5 in; oval. For this work Charles de La Fosse was paid 600 livres in 1700, and 200 livres more in 1701, "for the perfect payment of 800 livres for the picture he made at Meudon, representing Hercules".

. The painting, painted in 1700, had a format of 3 feet 10 inches by 3 feet 5 inches. Frédéric Villot correctly identified the painting at Meudon as a canvas, now rectangular, in the museum of Nevers in 1872

By Jean Jouvenet: Latone and the peasants of Lycia. A copy of this work is preserved in the Museum of Art and History of Meudon, another, undoubtedly the original, in the Palace of Fontainebleau It is inspired directly by the central white marble sculpture of the Latone fountain in the gardens of the Palace of Versailles.

- Latone et les paysans lyciens: By Louis de Boullogne the Younger. Cephale and Procris: Cephalus and his wife Procris, who gives a dart to her husband. After being deposited at Compiègne, the painting was sent in 1962 to the Musée de Saint-Etienne under the title: Venus and Adonis , and attributed in error to Bon Boullogne. Its former oval shape is clearly visible. The painting was made and placed in 1700, as David and Abigail commissioned by the same painter. A preparatory drawing is held at the Cabinet des Arts Graphiques in the Louvre.
- Antoine Coypel], then the youngest painter of the four: 'Hercules bringing back Alceste from the underworld; Height 3 feet 10 inches; Width 3 feet. It is a question of "Hercules returning to Admetus his wife Alceste that he brings back from the Underworld", a picture brought to Meudon by Antoine Coypel himself. The painting was placed before May 1700, according to a memoir cited by F. Engerand Charles-Antoine Coypel, the painter's son, showed the novelty of these literary subjects. To execute the painting of Meudon, Antoine Coypel had translated by M^{me} Dacier the fifth act of the tragedy of Euripides. The painting is preserved in the Cholet Museum of Art and History. The work was formerly titled "Hercules Freeing Theseus"! In May 1700, Antoine Coypel came to Meudon himself to install his barely completed work.
The four oval canvases in the billiard room of Monseigneur in Meudon throughout the 18th century

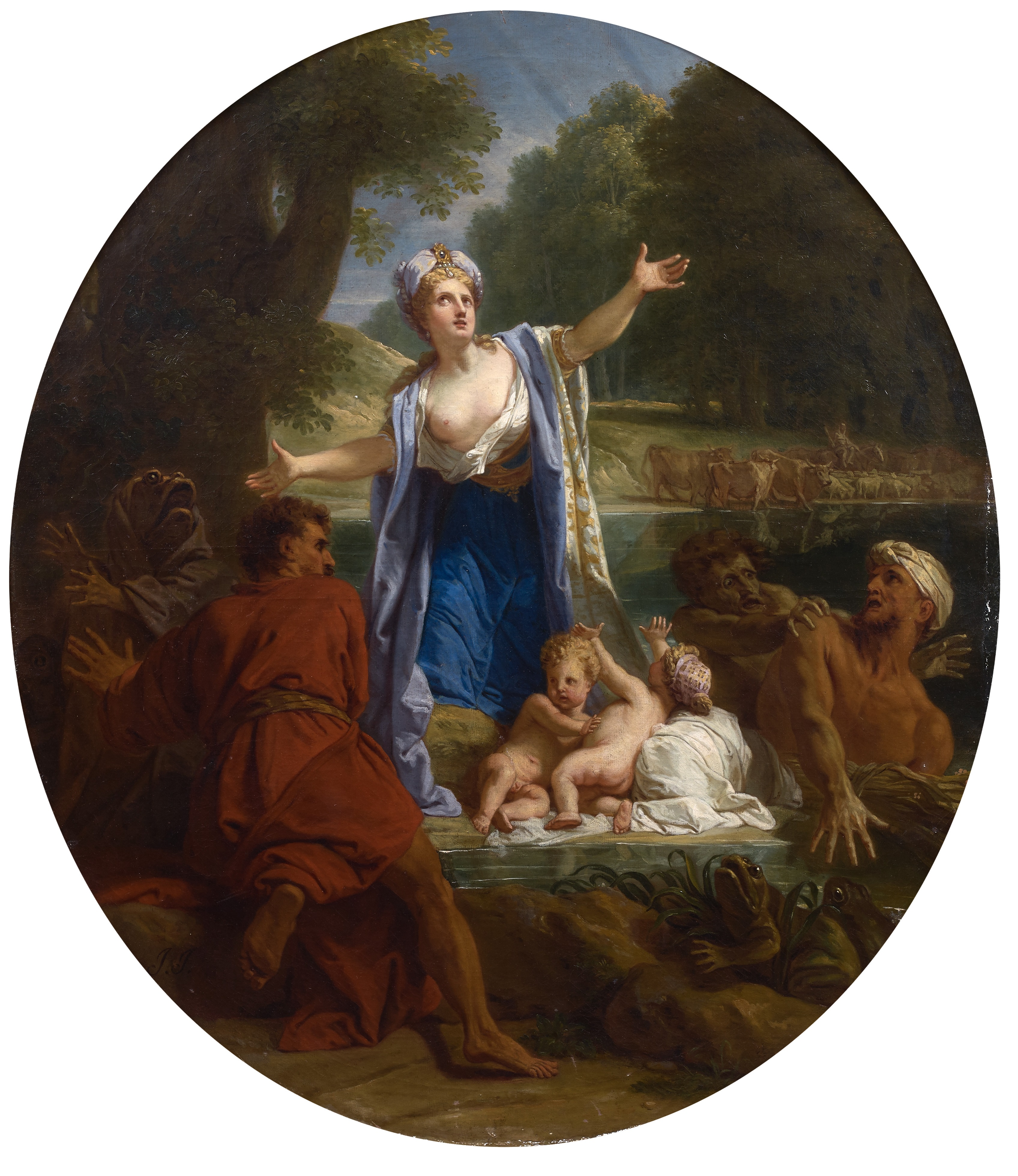
Latone et les paysans de Lycie, Jean Jouvenet, Musée d'art et d'histoire in Meudon

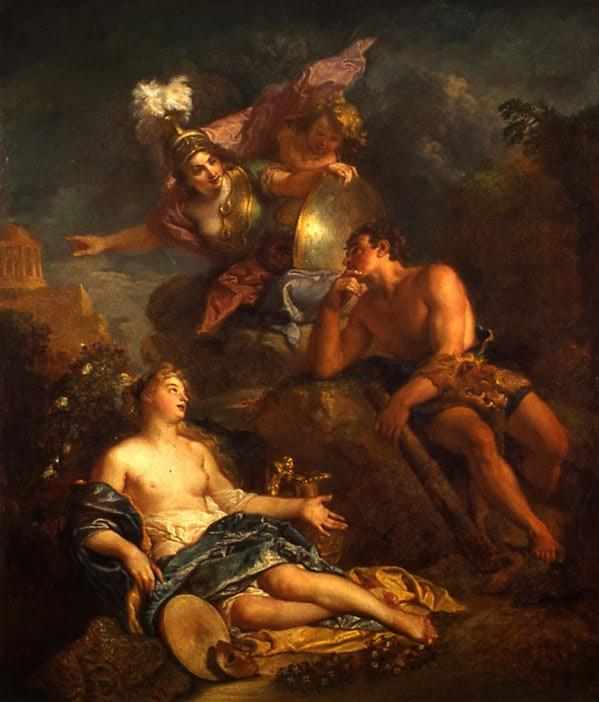
Hercule entre la Volupté et la Vertu (Hercules Between Voluptuousness and Virtue), Charles de La Fosse, musée de Nevers

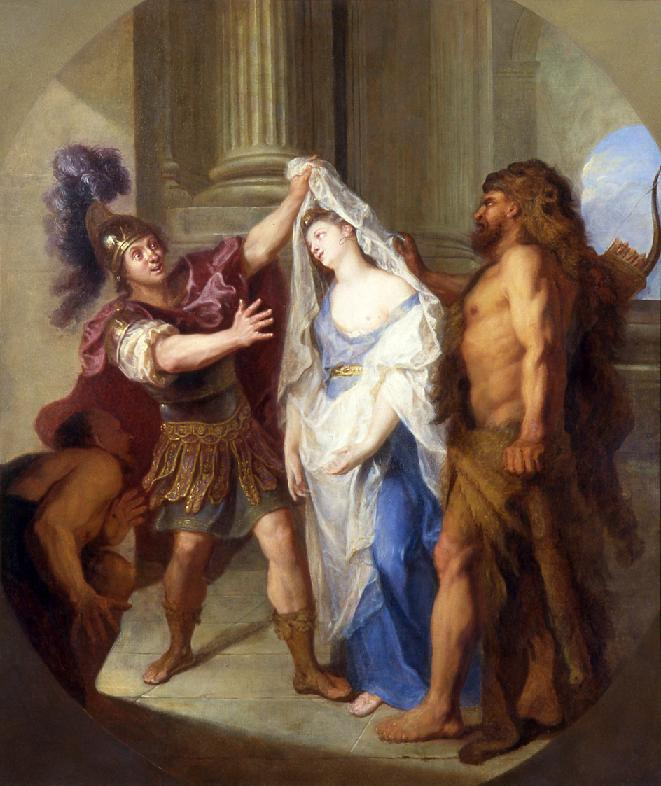
Hercules Bringing Alceste Out of the Hells, Antoine Coypel, Musée d'art et d'histoire de Cholet

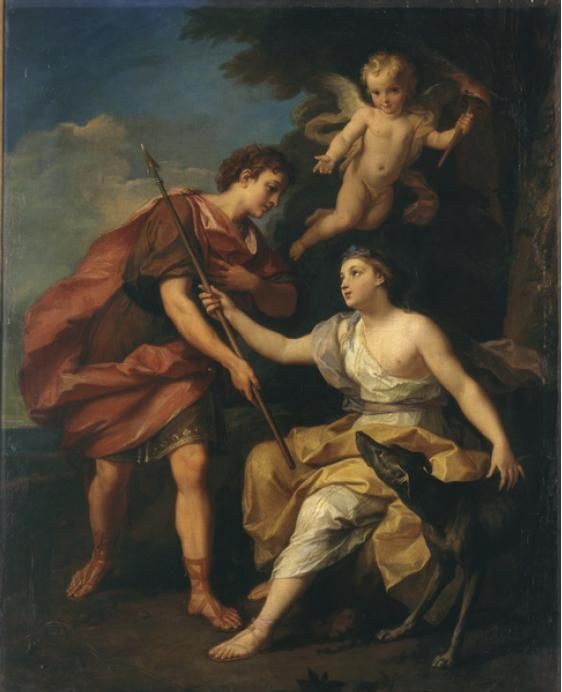
Céphale et Procris, Louis de Boullogne le Jeune, Musée des Beaux-Arts de Saint-Étienne.

Antechamber (former dining room of the Dauphin from 1695 to 1699)

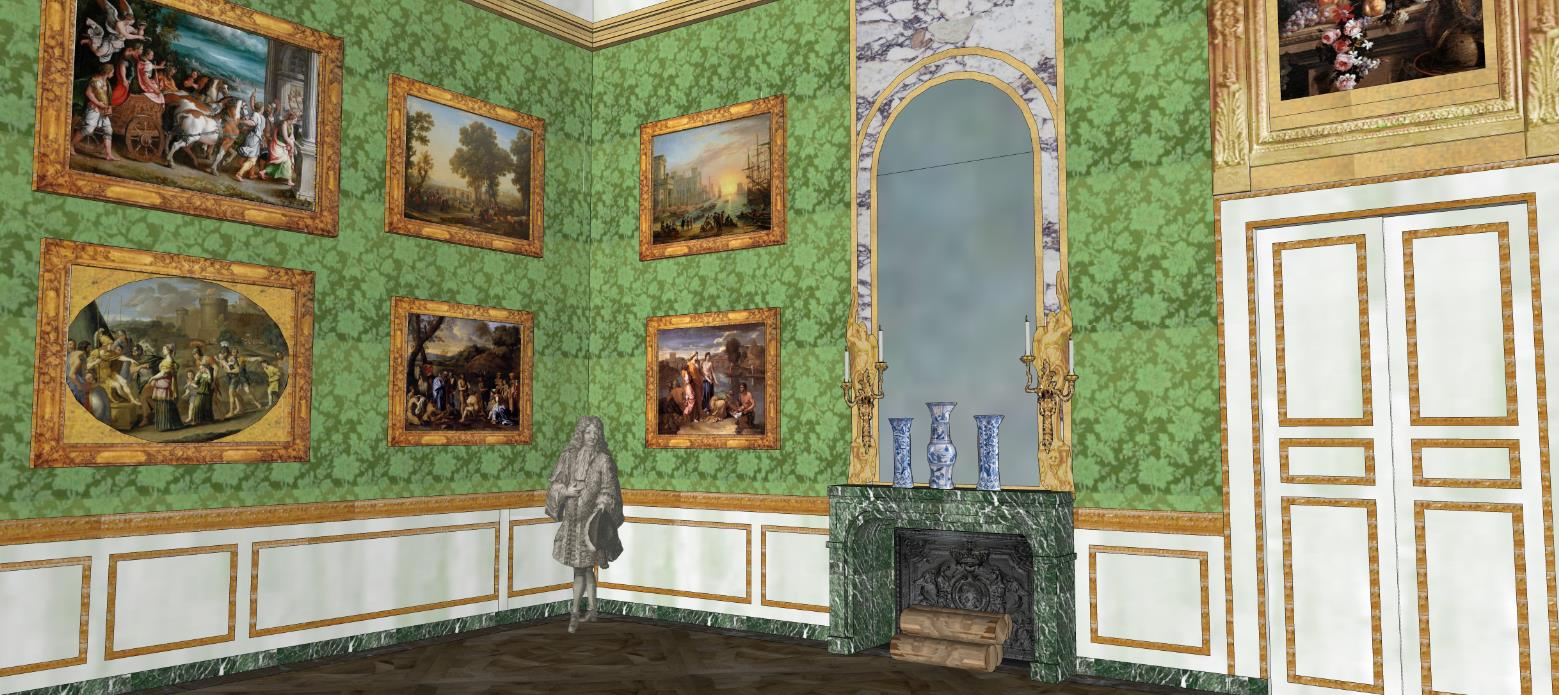
Proposed restoration of the antechamber of the dauphin in the Château-Vieux at Meudon, ca. 1700, with the collection of André Le Nôtre paintings.

The former "dining room of Monseigneur", which had this function in 1695, became a real antechamber with the enlargement of the apartment. The inventory of 1775 indicates: "Room lighted by two windows, paneling with gold frames, gilded cornice, ceiling in gilt arabesque and painted by Claude Audran. Jacques-François Blondel recalls his admiration for these ceilings of arabesques at Meudon, although he condemns the style of the ceiling to decorate the dwelling of a prince:

« D'ailleurs l'on peut réduire ces ouvrages à des nuages avec des Génies, & à quelques belle grisaille qui en forme les extrémités; décoration préférable à ces riches, mais peu vraisemblables peintures grotesques, dont on voit d'ingénieux desseins d'Audran, & qui sont exécutées avec un succès étonnant dans quelques appartements de Meudon, aussi bien que dans les plafonds & sur les lambris du Château de la Ménagerie: seul bâtiment où ce genre de peinture soit convenable ».

The inventory of 1775 adds that there is also a "green Campan marble chimney, the top of the mantelpiece decorated with marble of any height with gold-bronze ornamentation of ground gold, the mirror in two parts, the first 52 inches wide by 96 inches high, the second 52 inches by 26 inches high. Two paintings above the doors of each 3 feet 6 inches wide by 2 feet 9 inches high, representing fruit and flowers, painted by Jean-Baptiste Belin".

In this antechamber, the dauphin placed the collection of paintings offered to Louis XIV in 1693 by André Le Nôtre and which the king put at the disposal of his son. These works are now preserved in the Louvre Museum.

====== Bedchamber of the Grand Dauphin ======
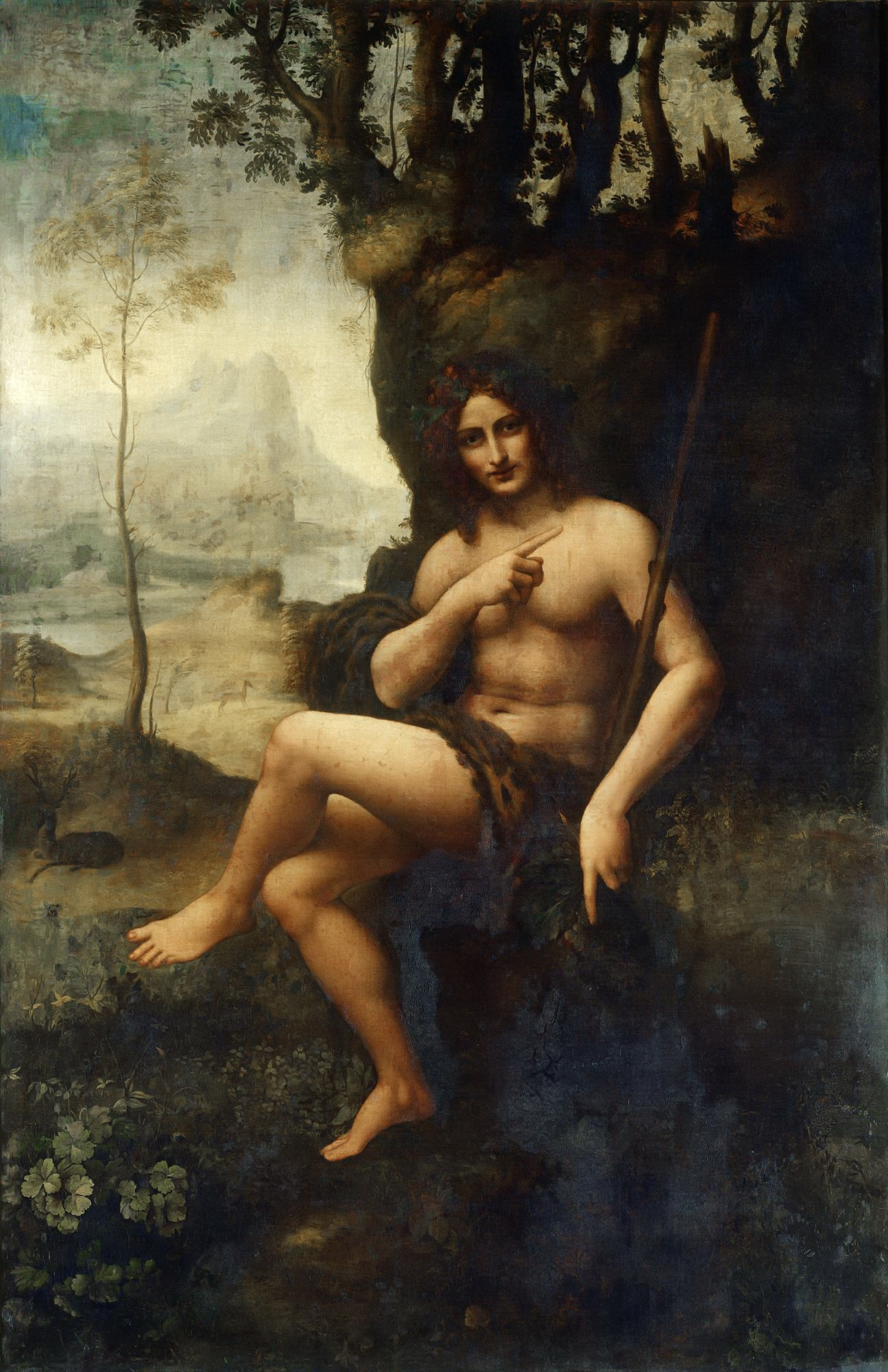
Bacchus by Leonardo da Vinci, Museum of the Louvre, work placed in the chamber of Monseigneur in 1705

The inventory of 1775 indicates that the chamber of the Dauphin possessed: "Wall panels of gilded frames, gilded cornice, gilded ceiling and painted in arabesques by Claude Audran III, marble serancolin fireplace, the top in violet brown marble, the whole very ornamented with bronze gilded of ground gold. (...) Two paintings above doors of 3 feet 5 inches by 4 feet 1 inch wide representing fruits painted by Batiste ". It is in this room that Monseigneur died on April 14, 1711. This chimney excited the curiosity of the researchers: the famous little painting preserved at Versailles, representing "the Regent in his Cabinet of work with the Duke of Chartres" by Fiske Kimball as representing the Dauphin at Meudon. Of course, one finds there the type of furniture and decorations that could decorate the castle. But Jerome de La Gorce asks the right question:

"Has this interior really existed? Is it not surprising that the chimney, the paneling to the left of the door and the desk, that is to say, most of the elements of the decoration, are identical to the engraved work of Berain? Would not the painter, whose career is still obscure, have had recourse to the plates published by the draftsman to reconstruct a framework worthy of the personages whom he represented? The inventory of the furnishings of the crown mentions in the year 1695: "[n °] 1615 - An upholstery [sic] of red and yellow satin velvet, embroidered and silver lined, listed before No. 783, Which has been upgraded and furnished to serve Monseigneur le Dauphin at Meudon, now consisting of a full bed, four armchairs, eight folding seats, two panes, two doors, six sheets of screens, a business chair and two tapestries".

In addition, Monseigneur retrieved for his room the small ebony desk encrusted with copper and tortoiseshell which he had bought at Godron, which had a plateau supported by eight bronze caryatids, with, in the middle of the marquetry, one cupid on an escarpolette. In addition to this desk, the room included a table and two pedestals, the tablets of which were decorated with Chinese grotesques with figures and birds.

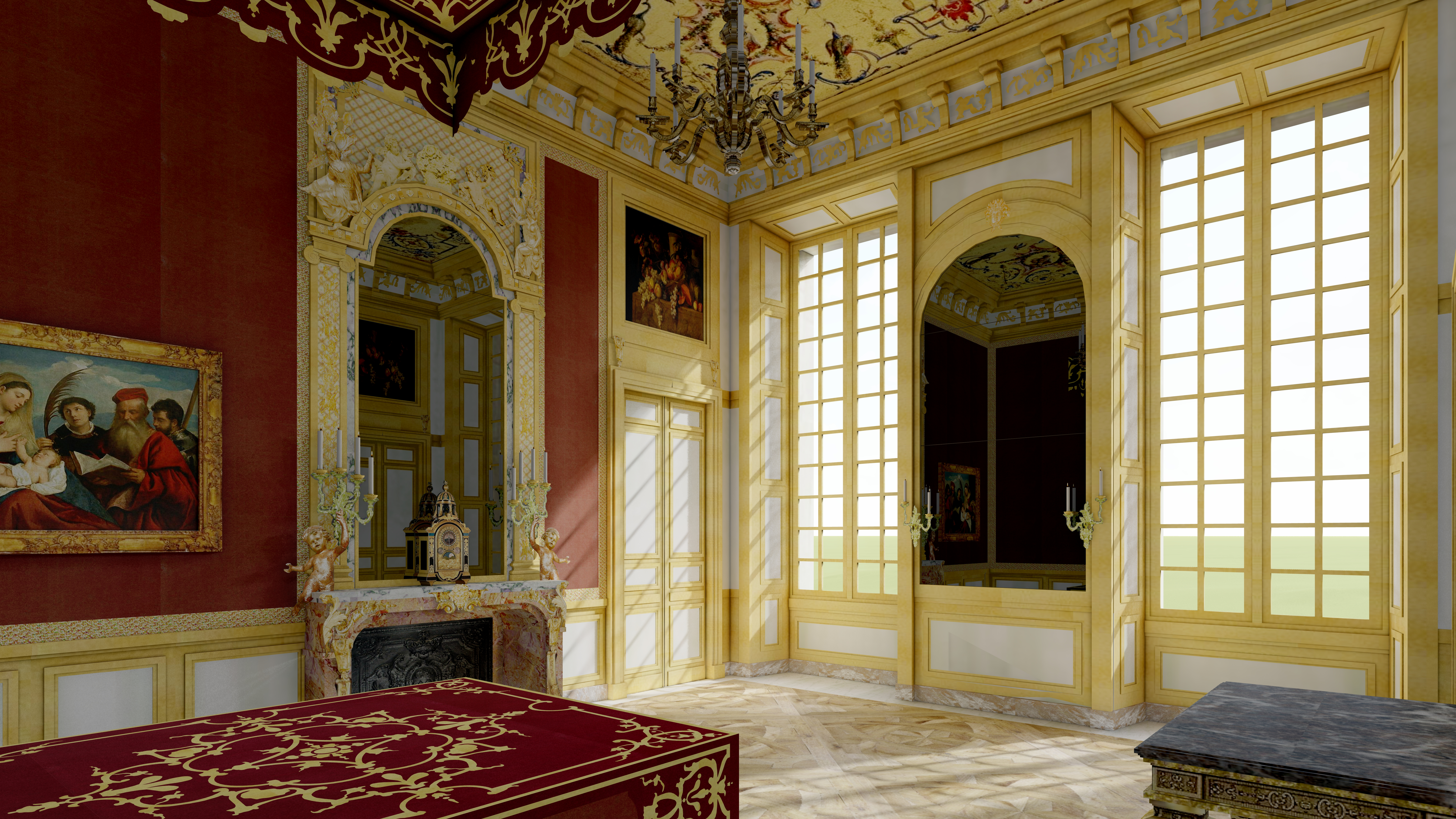
Restoration sketch of the bedroom of Monseigneur, in the "Grand Appartement" on the ground floor of the east wing of the château-vieux in Meudon. Circa 1700–1711. (Mirror dimensions based on sources)

====== Corner cabinet ======
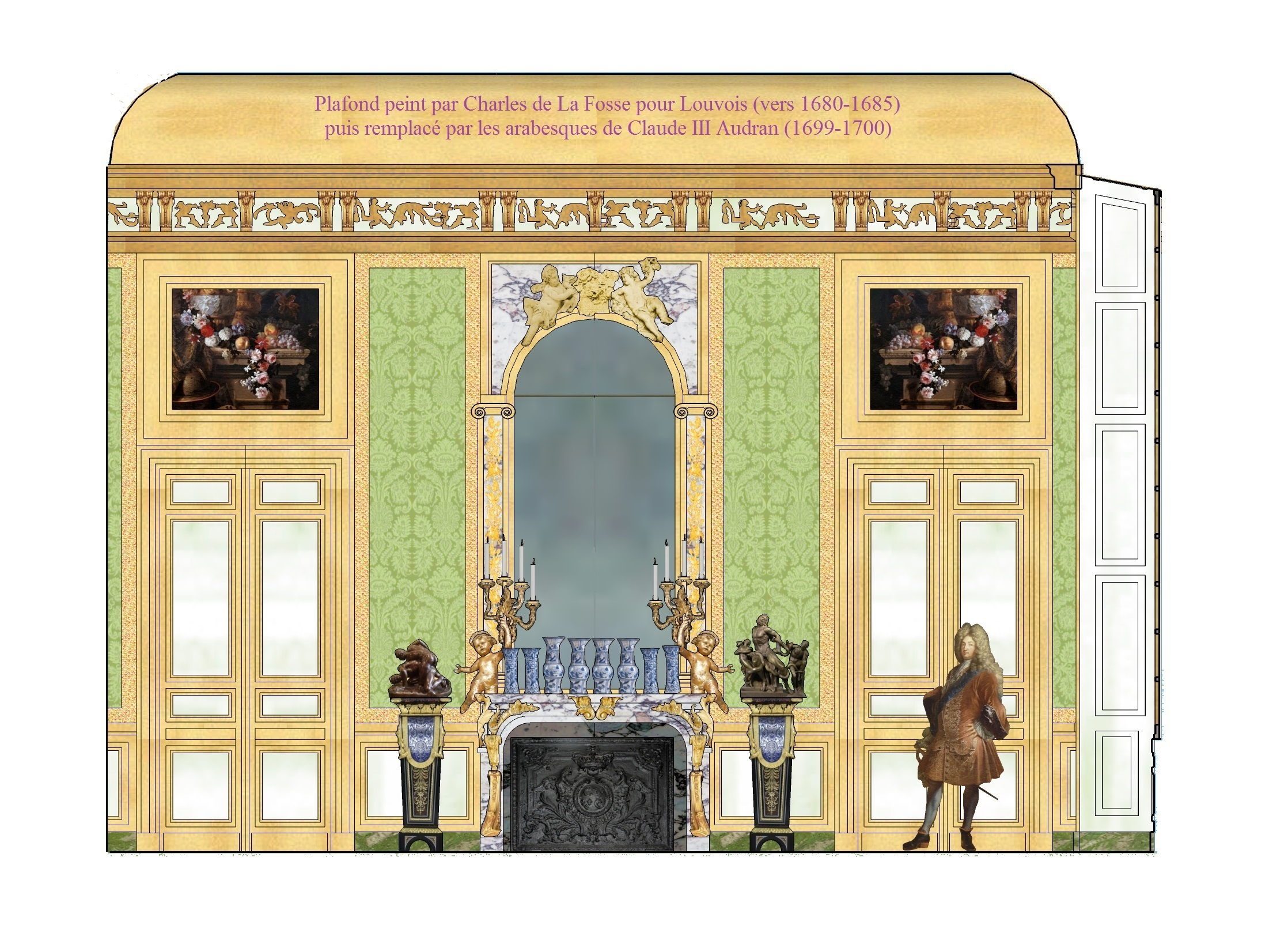
Proposition de restitution of the corner cabinet of the dauphin. Condition between 1700 and 1792

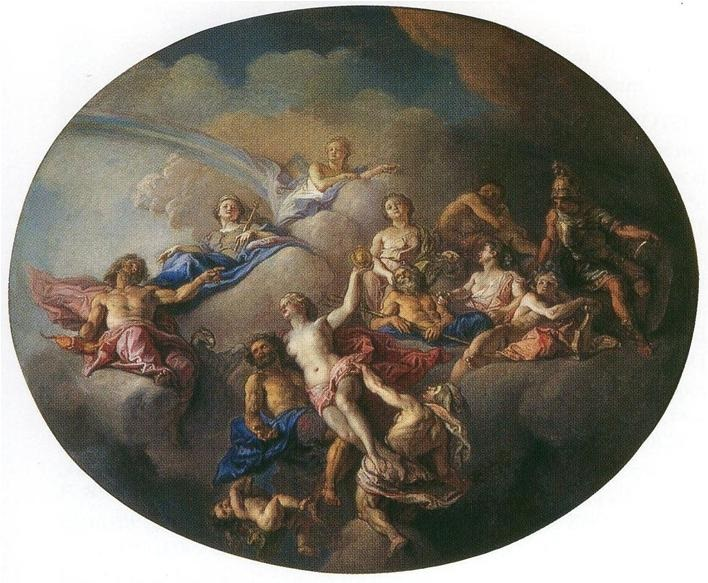
Le triomphe de Pandore (Triumph of Pandora), Charles de La Fosse. Ca. 1685. Private collection. Model for the painted ceiling by Louvois. Monseigneur cancelled this ceiling, preferring the arabesques by Claude Audran III

The inventory of 1775 indicates that the room was adorned with "Wall panels with large gold frames, golden cornice, gilded ceiling with arabesques painted by Audran. Chimney of violet breccia marble, the top decorated in marble of all the height with bronzes very rich in children and ornaments gilded of ground gold (...). As with the two previous rooms, Audran decorated with arabesques the ceiling: "Having come to Meudon on April 22, 1699, the king left on the 24th; Two days later, on the 25th of April, Mansart received orders from Monsignor to have the paintings of the ceiling of his corner cabinet erased, to print it with three layers of white, and to paint a base Grotesque like that in the room of the Dauphin. " The ceiling which was then erased can only be that realized by Charles de La Fosse for Louvois, whose subject is Pandora, and whose modello has been identified by Clémentine Gustin-Gomez. In 1702 twas found: "In the Grand Cabinet of Monseigneur: Five Porcelains, 630 Louis; Two Bronzes 180 Louis. Stéphane Castelluccio identified these two bronzes as the Laocoon and Lutteurs, for which Monseigneur certainly commanded their rich 'feet of marquetry'. Finally, the inventory of the royal furniture indicates under the number: "1768 - Four couty mats striped with two strands of wool, with their threads of several colors, for the windows of the cabinet of Monseigneur at Meudon."

Saint-Simon, describing the death of the Grand Dauphin, tells us that it is in this room, on the evening of April 14, 1711, that the famous scene of the comings and goings takes place between the corner cabinet of the king, and the adjoining room where Monseigneur was dying:

"As he was about to enter the room, the Princess of Conti, who had had time to run to Monseigneur's in that short interval of the table-out, presented herself to prevent him from entering the room. She even pushed him away, and told him that he must no longer think of anything but himself. Then the king, almost in weakness of so sudden and complete a reversal, let himself go on a couch which was at the entrance of the door of the closet by which he had entered, which gave into the room. He asked all that came out of it for news, and hardly anyone dared to reply. Madame de Maintenon, hastening to the king, sat on the same sofa and tried to weep. She was trying to take the king, whose carriages were already ready in the courtyard, but there was no way of making him realize that the Monseigneur had expired. This unconscious agony lasted nearly an hour after the king was in the closet. The Duchess and the Princess de Conti divided themselves between the care of the dying man and of the king, to whom they frequently returned, while the confused Faculty, the distraught valets, the buzzing courtesan, pushed each other and walked without ever changing place".

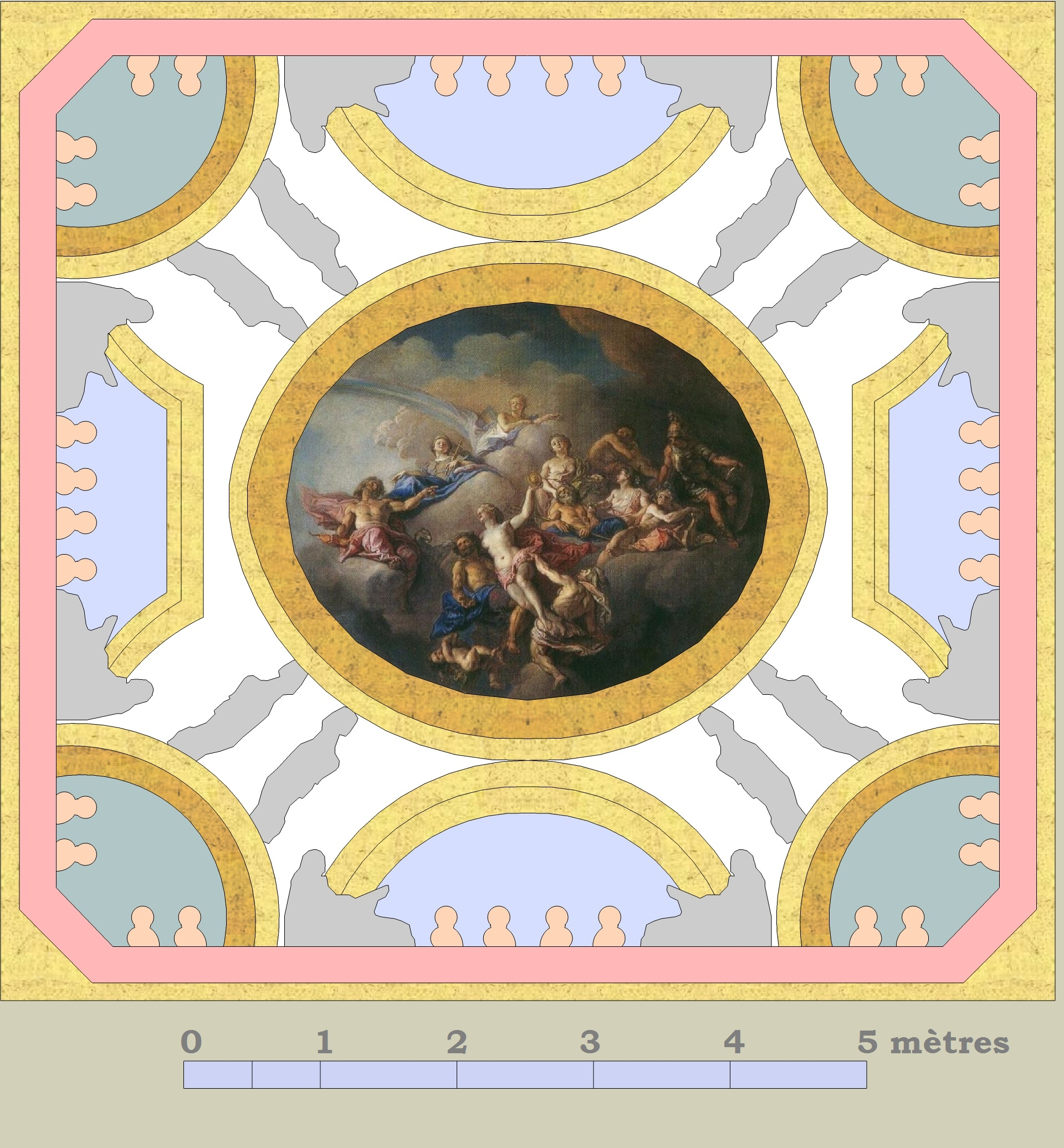
Schéma of the ceiling of the corner cabinet, erased by the dauphin in 1699

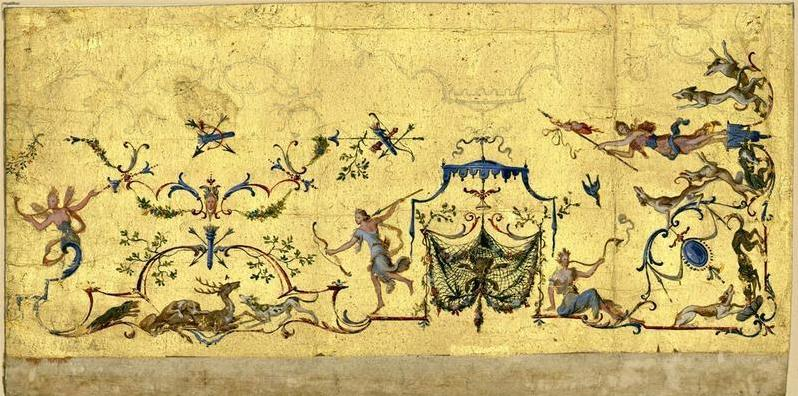
Arabesques on gold background by Claude Audran III, circa 1700. Archives des Arts décoratifs de Paris. For the Ménagerie de Versailles or the apartment of the Dauphin at Meudon

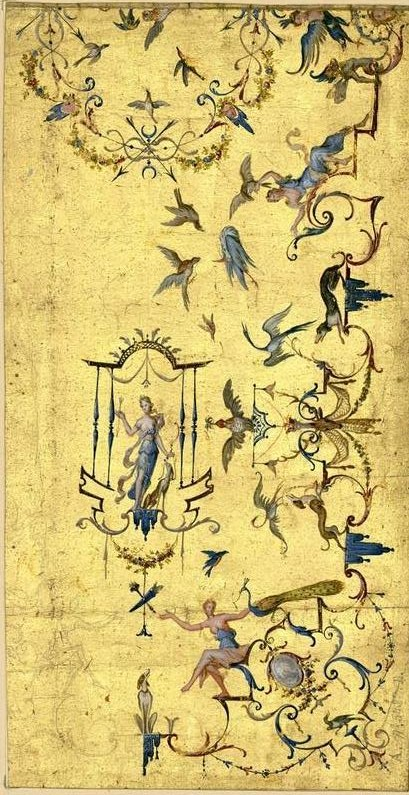
Other decorations by Audran.

===== The apartment named "of the Duke and the Duchess of Burgundy" =====
It was situated between the Grand Vestibule and the apartment of Monseigneur.

These rooms were the main apartment of Abel Servien, who died there in his room on the ground floor in 1659.

When Monseigneur settled in Meudon in 1695 he gave this dwelling, next to his own, to Philip of Orleans (1640–1701), who occupied it until his death in 1701. The dwelling was then occupied by the Duke and the Duchess of Burgundy until their death in 1712.

==== Rooms on the ground floor ====
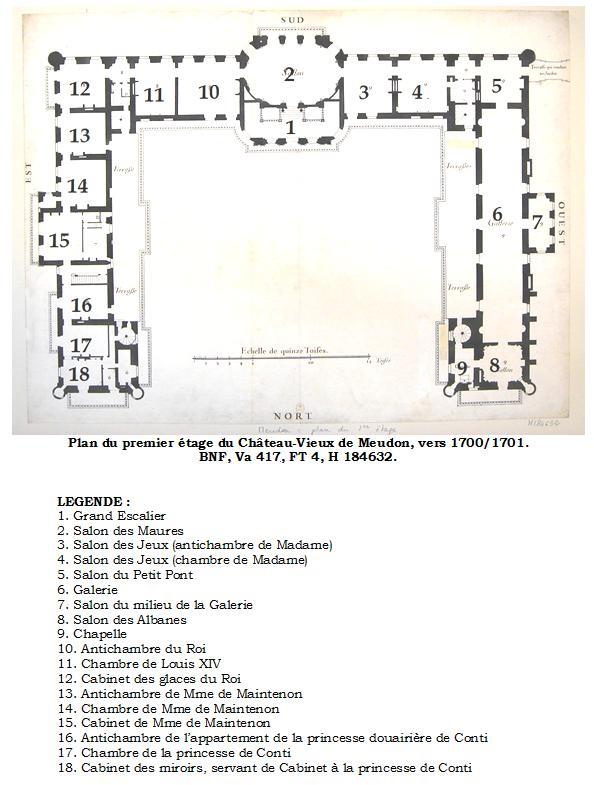
Ground floor of the Château-Vieux of Meudon in 1700

The first floor contained large reception rooms, mainly the "Salon des Moures" and the gallery.

===== Salon des Maures =====
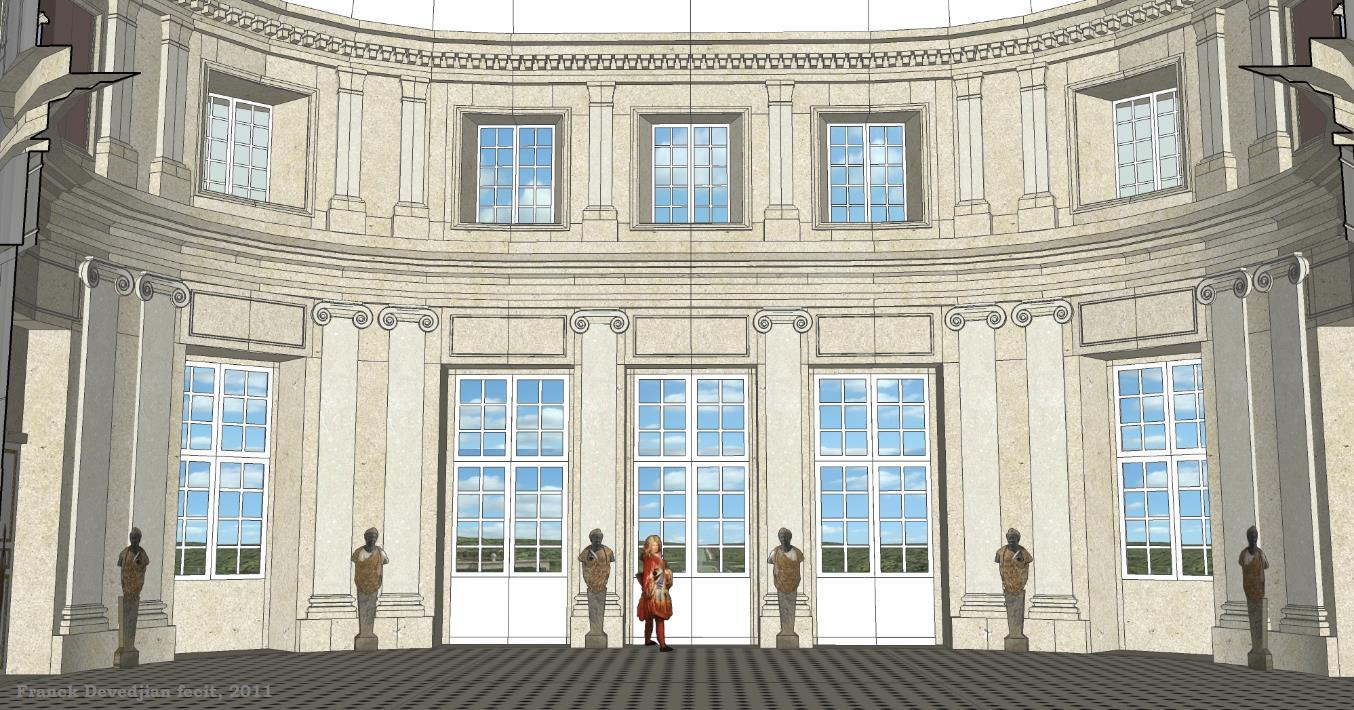
Sketch of restoration of the salon from the entrance, by the Grand Escalier (great staircase). Circa 1695

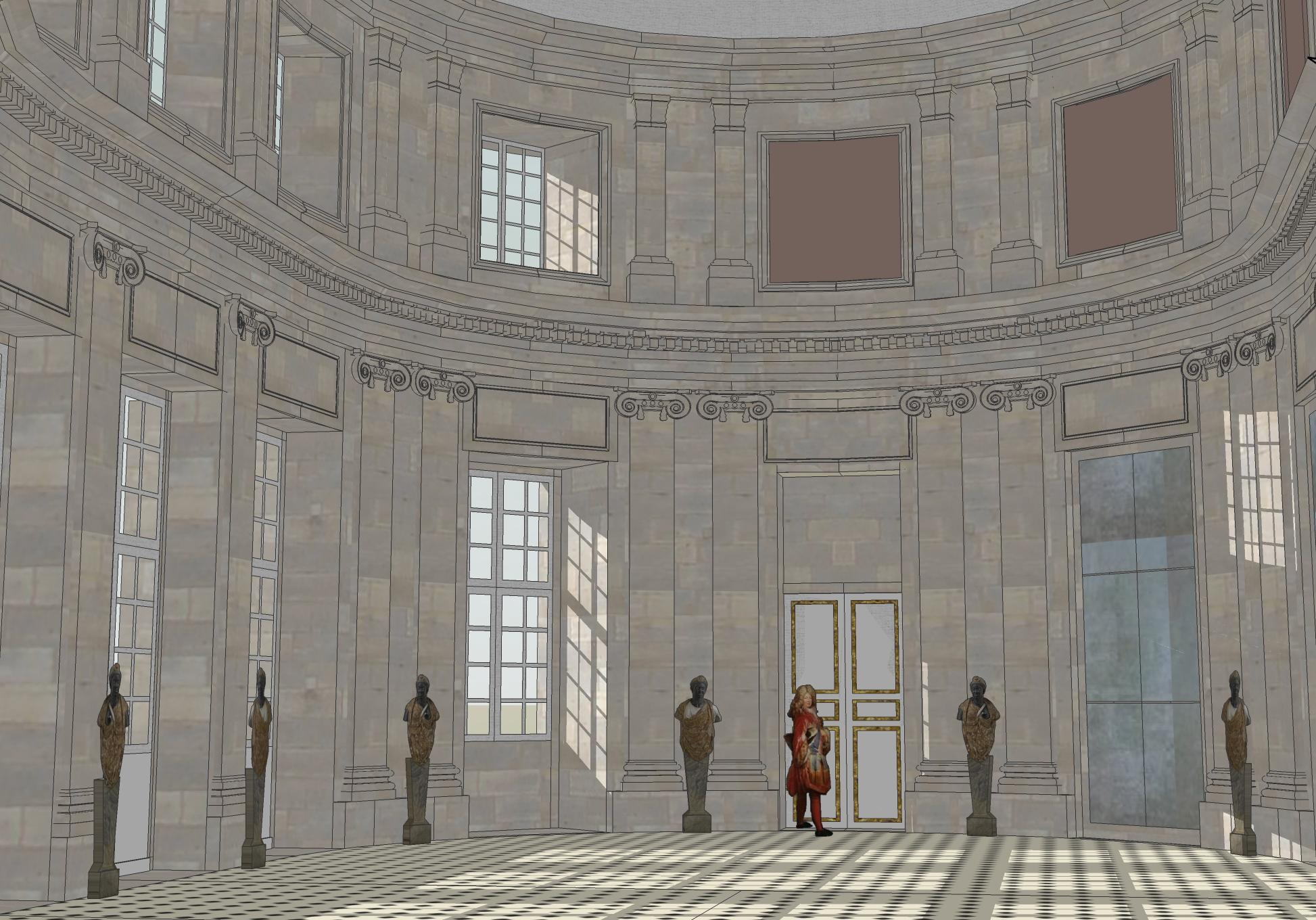
Salon des Maures (Salon of the Moors). Circa 1690

Abel Servien created this oval room, centerpiece of the castle, which looks out on the parterre. This salon was built at the same time as the one at Château de Vaux-le-Vicomte was built for Nicolas Fouquet, and is similar, although slightly smaller in size. The cupola received no painted decoration. Gabriel Blanchard produced the twelve grisailles under the cornice, which the 1733 inventory describes: "In the same salon there are twelve paintings painted in grisaille representing the twelve months of the year by games of children, they are of damoiselet [faux, of Gabriel Blanchard], and can not raise the place being all maroufles, two feet high, 6 feet 5 inches wide.

Louvois placed in this salon twelve terms in Moorish and Moorish marble, eight of which are now in the Palace of Compiègne, transferred there at the very end of the 18th century. The minister also embellished the attic with seven paintings of flowers by Jean-Baptiste Monnoyer. The 1733 inventory of paintings of Meudon describes them:

1. "a golden vase filled with all kinds of flowers, laid on a blue carpet embroidered with gold - the bottom of the picture is a sky."
2. "a golden vase, or rather an agathic manner, whose handles are of gold, filled with all kinds of flowers, a carpet behind which is embroidered with gold, with two parrots, one blue and the other yellow."
3. "A golden ornamented goderon vase filled with all kinds of flowers - a carpet behind embroidered gold with a red and green parrot".
4. "A vase in the shape of a silver bowl filled with all sorts of flowers placed on a red carpet embroidered with gold with a peacock on the bowl."
5. "A golden vase garnished with all kinds of flowers, among which a poppy falls with one of its leaves to the pedestal on which the vase is laid."
6. "A golden vase laid on a foot-filled way filled with all kinds of flowers with a peacock behind the vase."
7. "A gold and silver vase set on a blue and gold carpet whose lining is crimson with a monkey holding a fish."
Les termes en marbre de maures et de mauresques, Salon des Maures de Meudon. Aujourd'hui au palais de Compiègne.

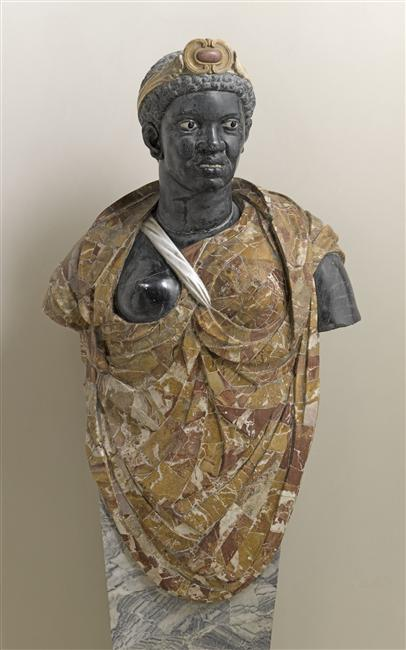
Terme féminin, C38.120 MR 2494.

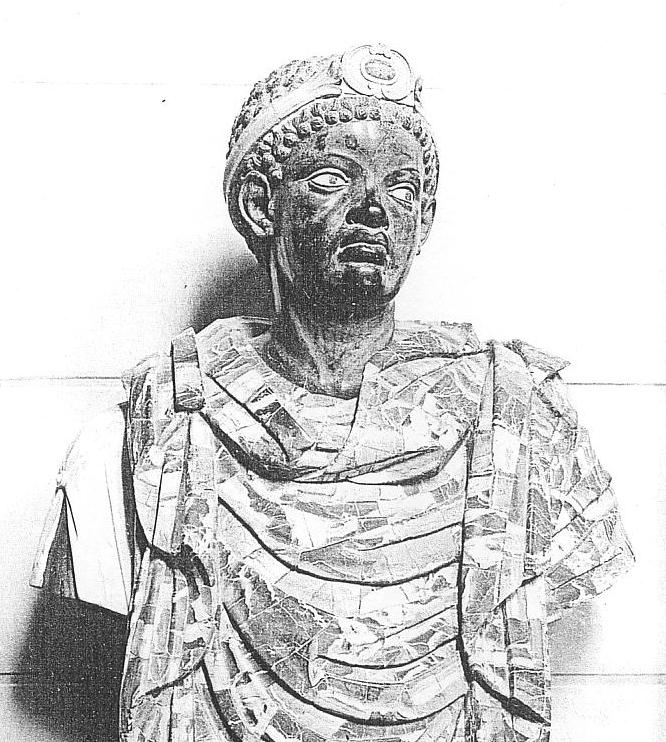
Terme masculin, C38.98 MR 2492.

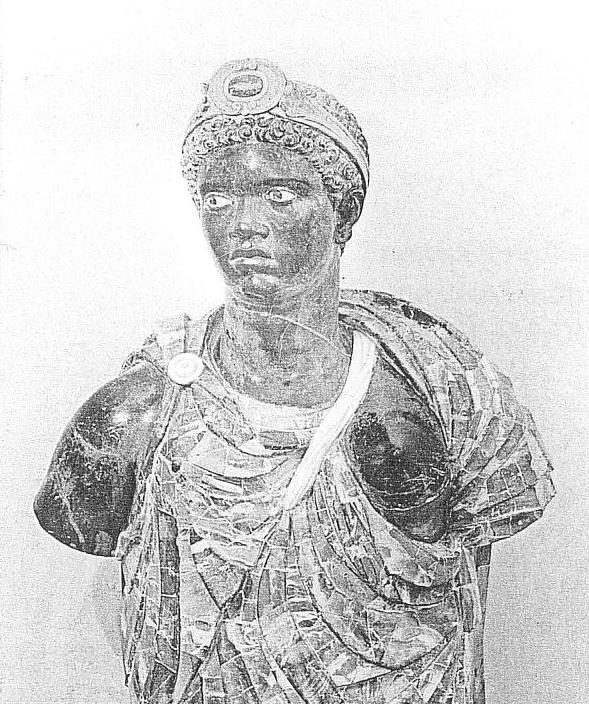
Terme féminin, C38.129 MR 2495.

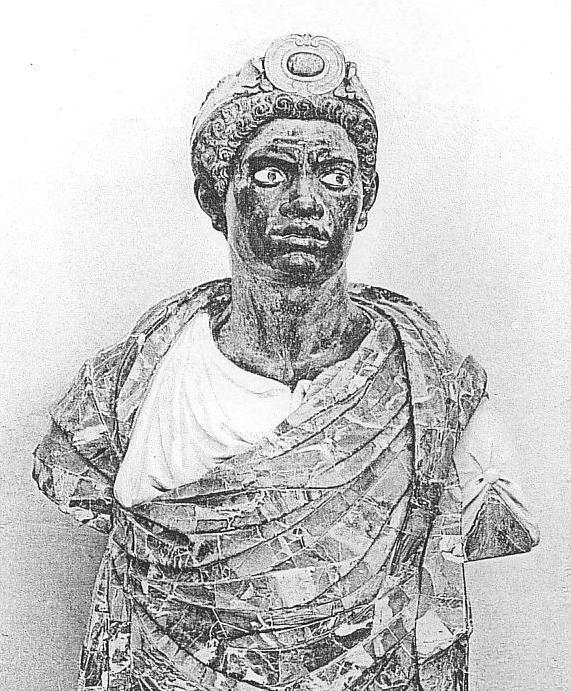
Terme masculin, C38.122 MR 2497.

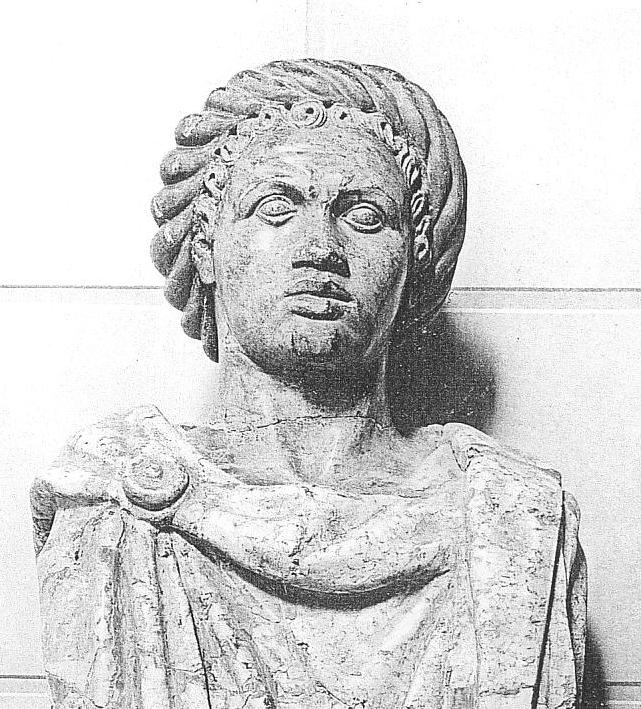
Terme masculin, C38.97 MR 2496.

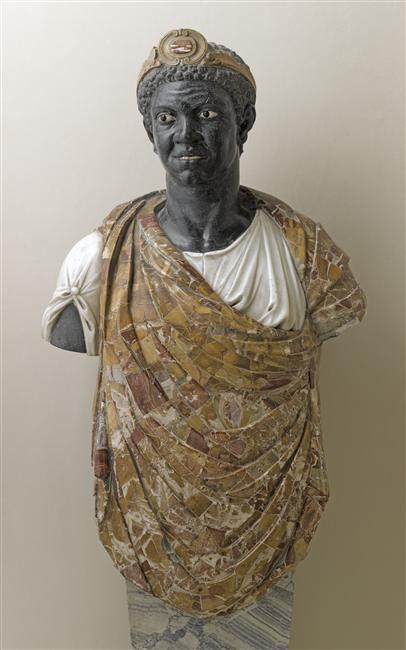
Terme masculin, C38.121 MR 2493.

===== The antechamber called games =====
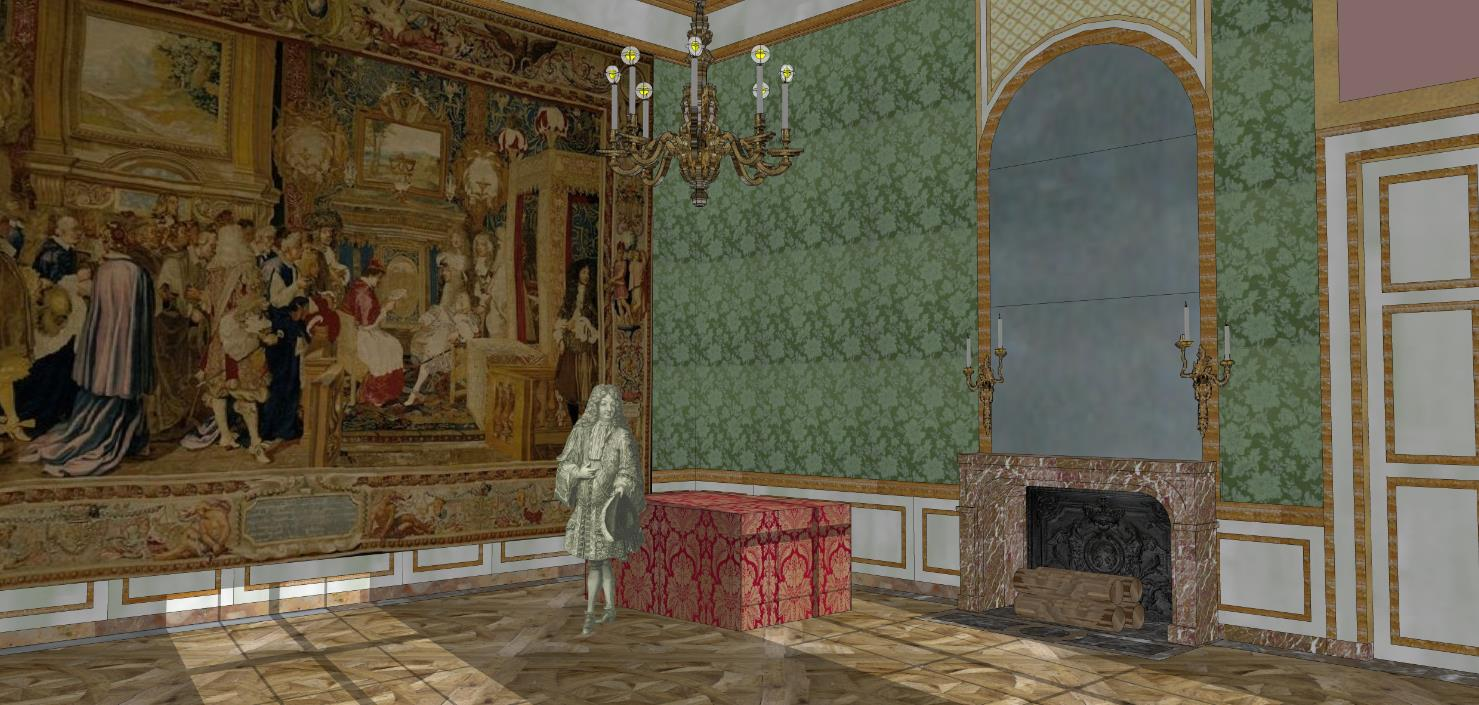
Essai de restitution de l'antichambre des jeux, vers 1700, avec la tapisserie de l'audience du cardinal Chigi, issue de la tenture de l'Histoire du Roi

After the Salon des Maures a series of reception rooms served as rooms for games, and, as it were, for so-called "apartment" evenings, as at Versailles. The first room after the oval salon was square and had two windows on the side of the pit. Monseigneur the dauphin hung on the wall the tapestry of the History of the King, to please his father.

===== Game room =====
The second room was similar to the first, and was also enriched with draperies, the northern bays being clogged for this purpose.

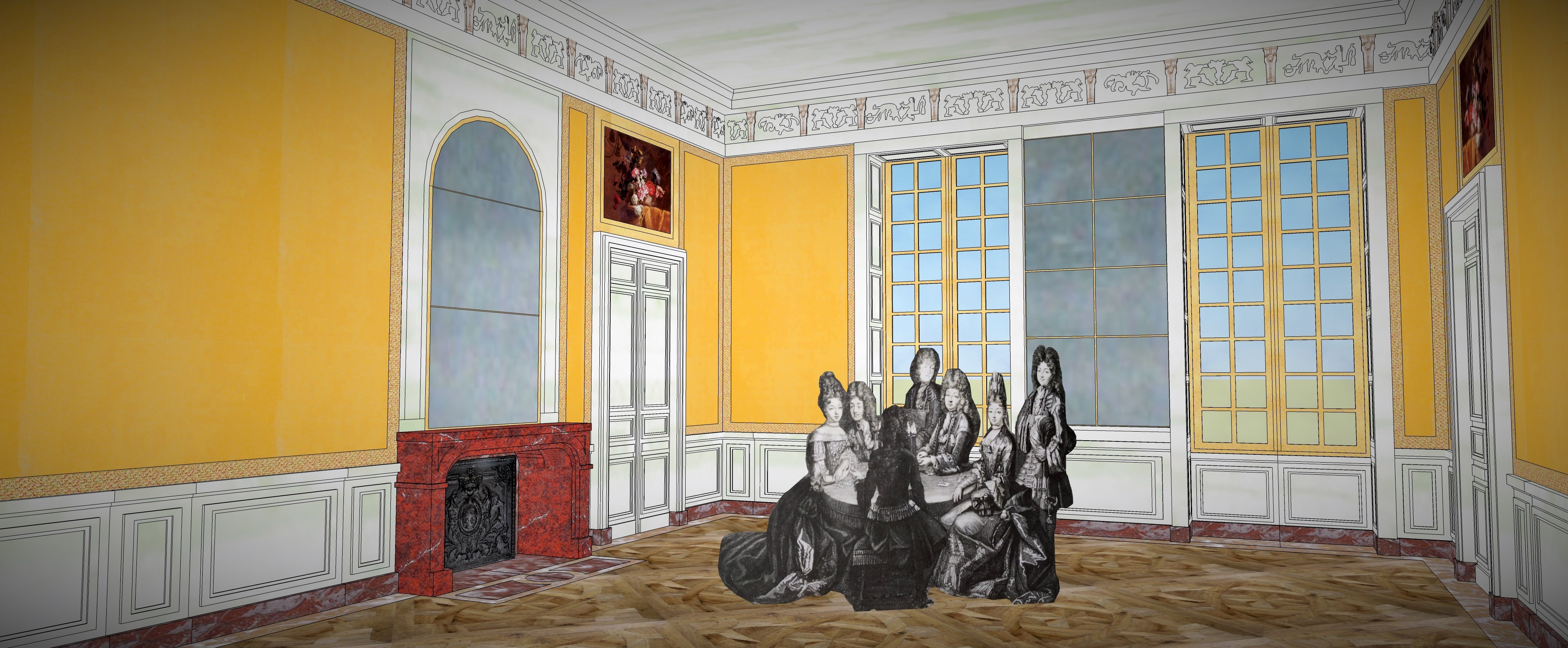
Game room, c 1700. De nombreuses tables de jeu prenaient place dans cette pièce, pour les soirées dites d'appartement.

===== Salon du Petit Pont =====
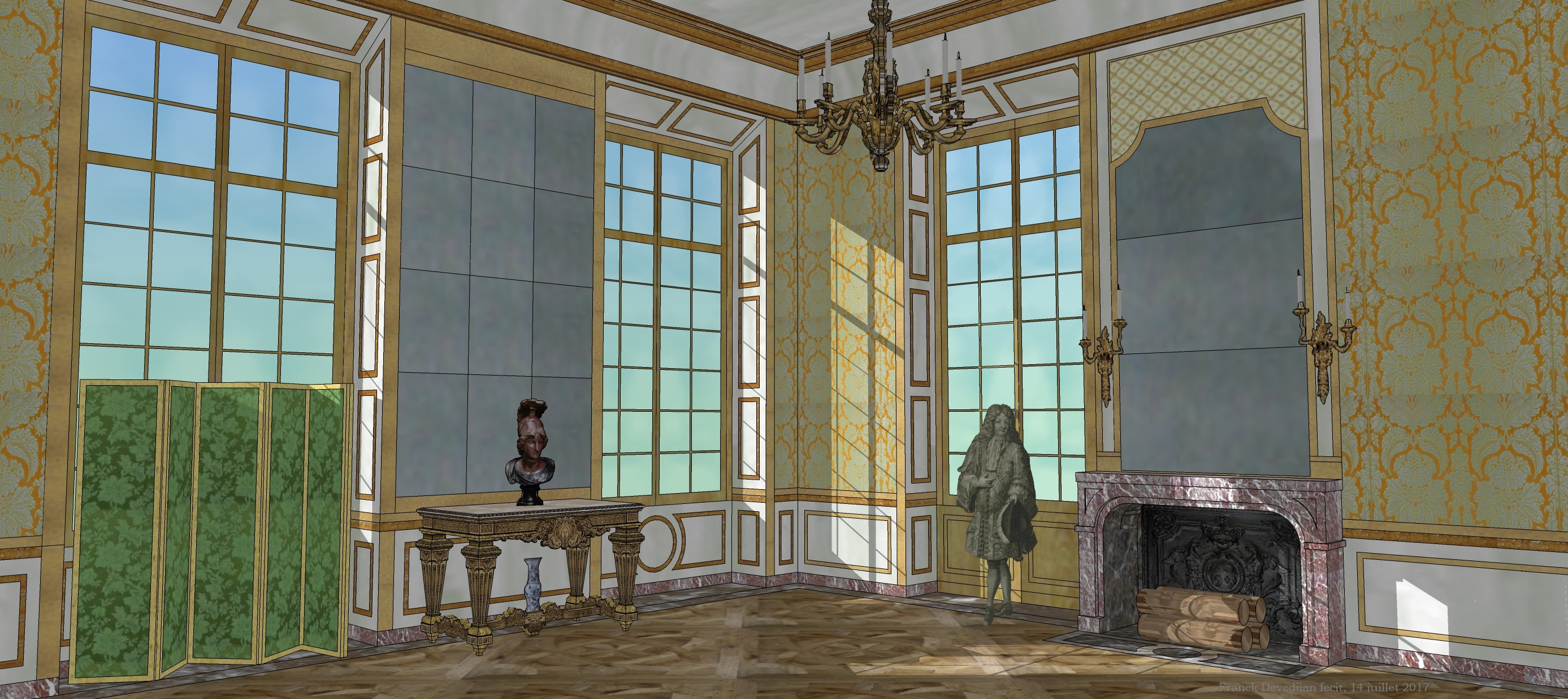
Essai de restitution of the Salon du Petit Pont, first floor of the château-vieux in Meudon. Circa 1700

This corner room was one of the two salons framing the gallery. It had access to the "Petit Pont" (small bridge), which led directly to the high gardens. Alexander's porphyry bust was placed there.

===== Gallery of the old castle =====
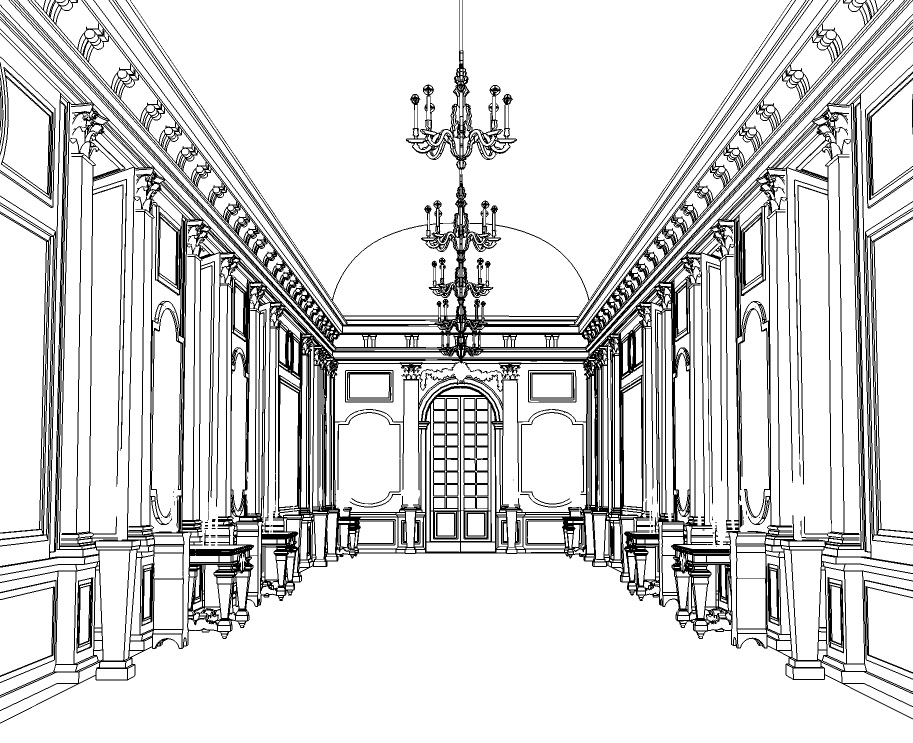
Schéma of the gallery of the Château-Vieux in Meudon

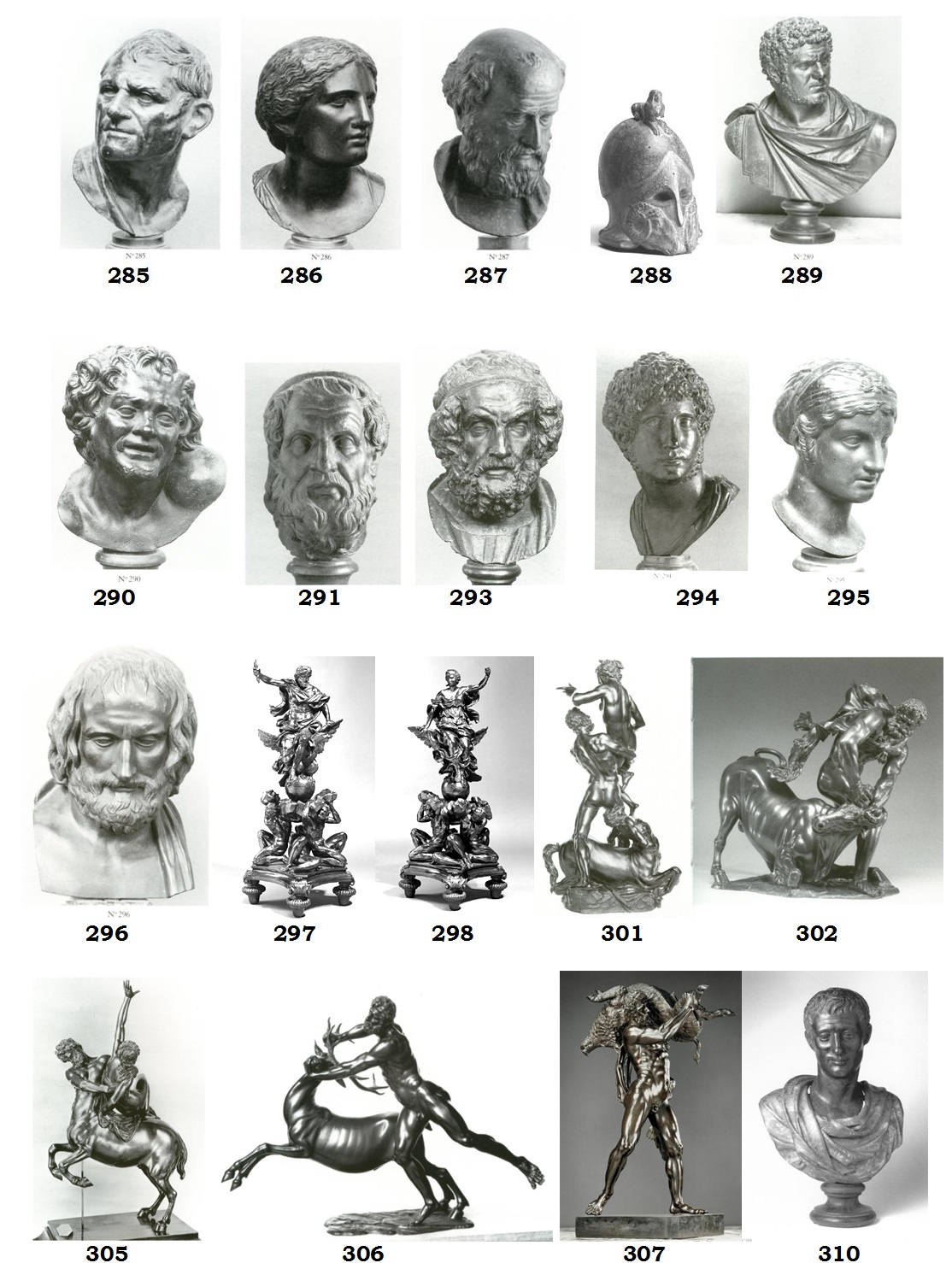
Bronzes of the Crown placed in the gallery at Meudon in the 18th century, with their inventory numbers

The gallery of Meudon had an area of 300 m², and the main room measured 40 meters long. There were also two drawing-rooms, the Salon du Petit Pont, and the Salon des Albane to the north.

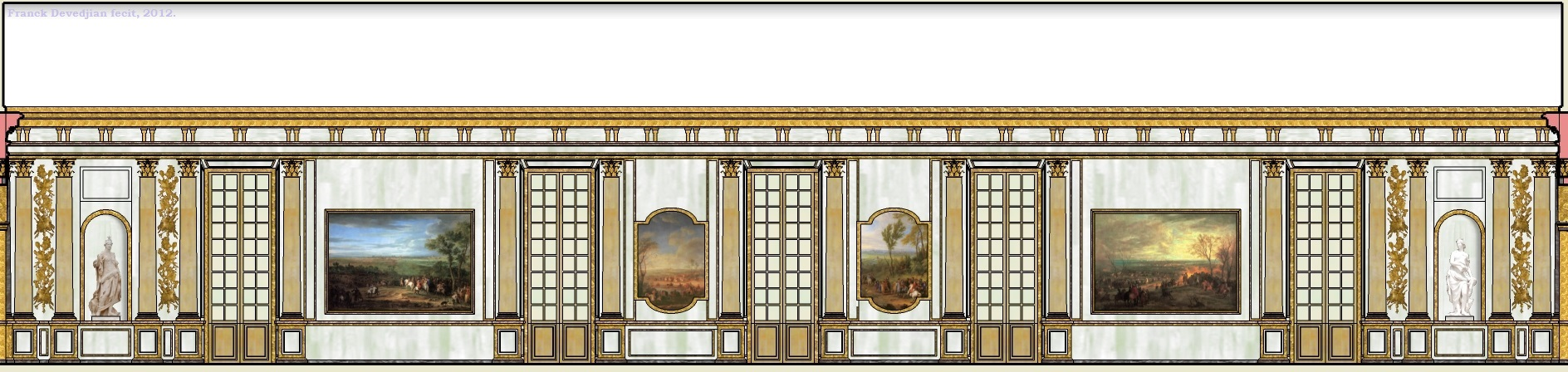
Draft reconstruction of the cross-section of the gallery of the Château-Vieux of Meudon

Van der Meulen canvases for the gallery in Meudon

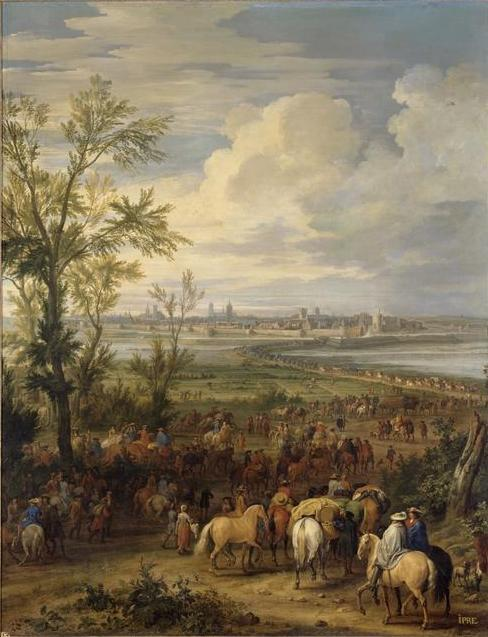
La prise d'Ypres

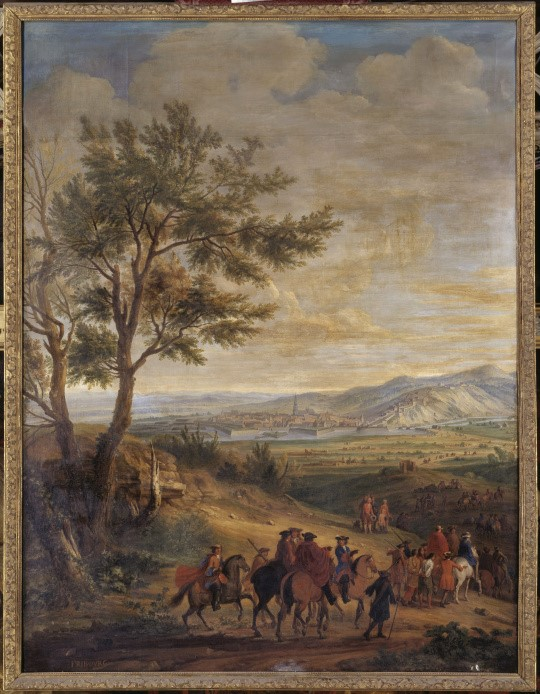
La prise de Fribourg

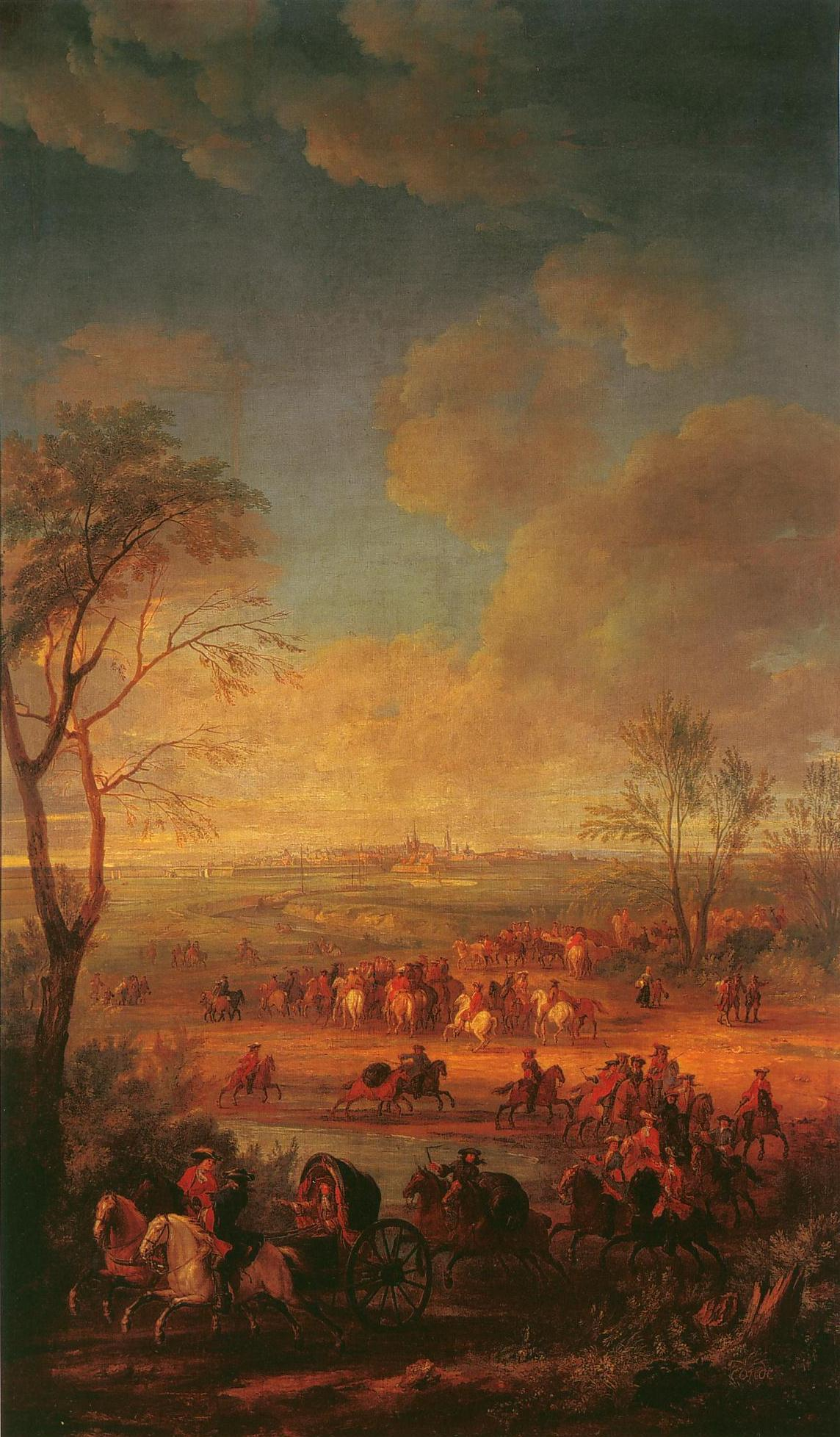
La prise de Condé

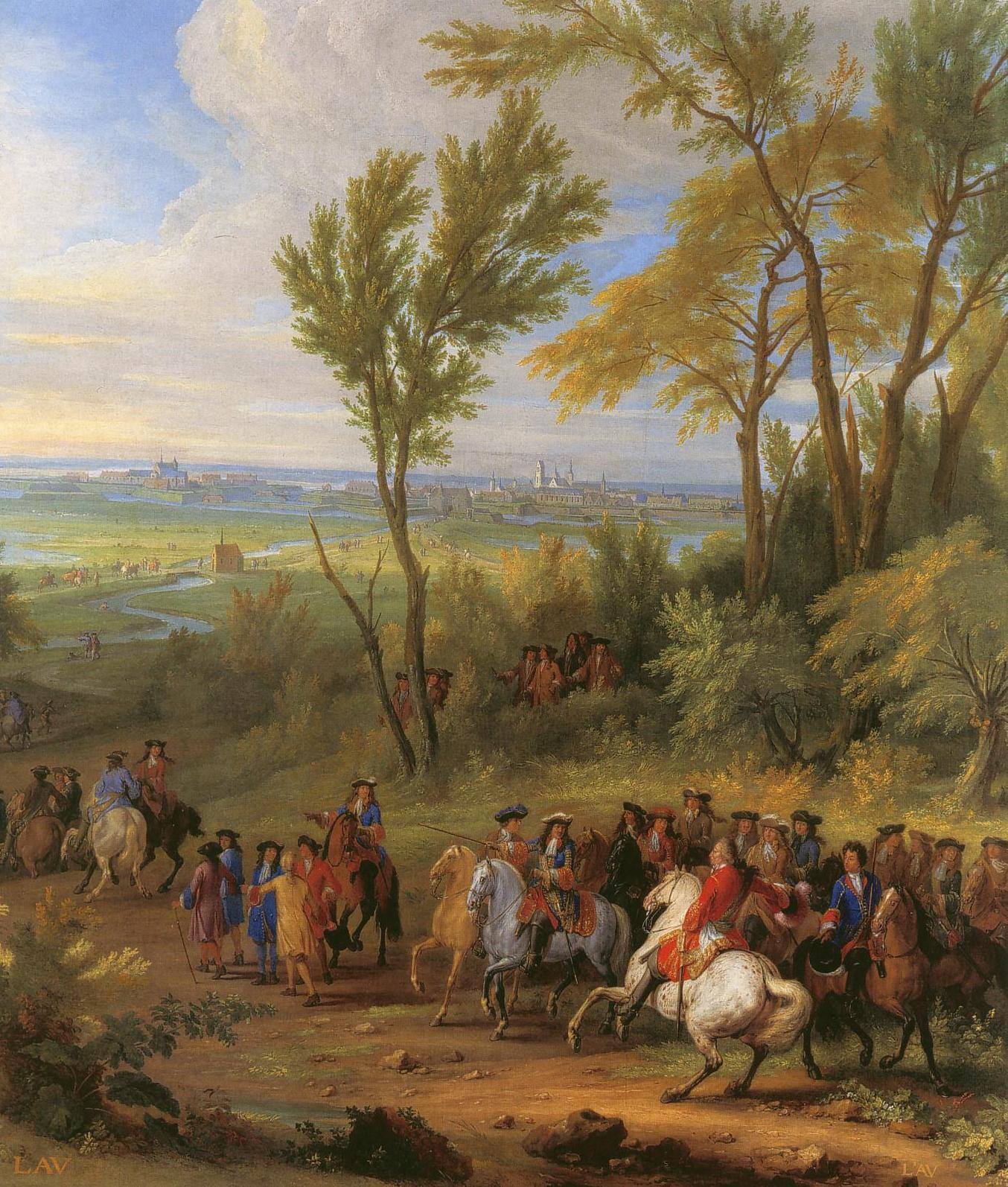
La prise de Lau
The four statues placed in the niches of the gallery under Monseigneur

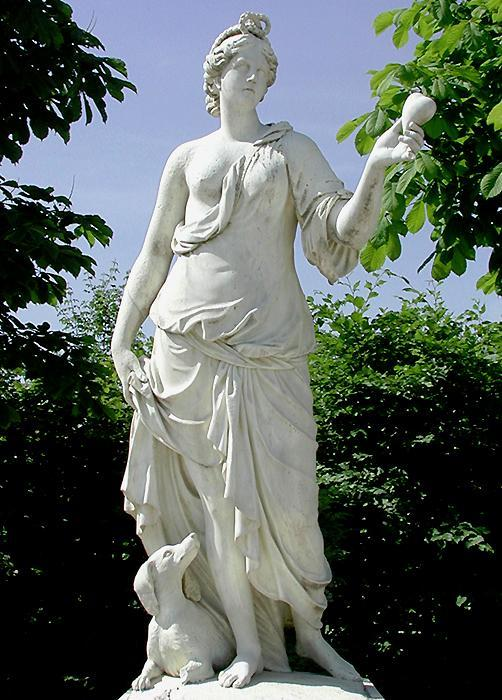
La Fidélité (Fidelity), following a drawing by Pierre Mignard, Jardins de Versailles

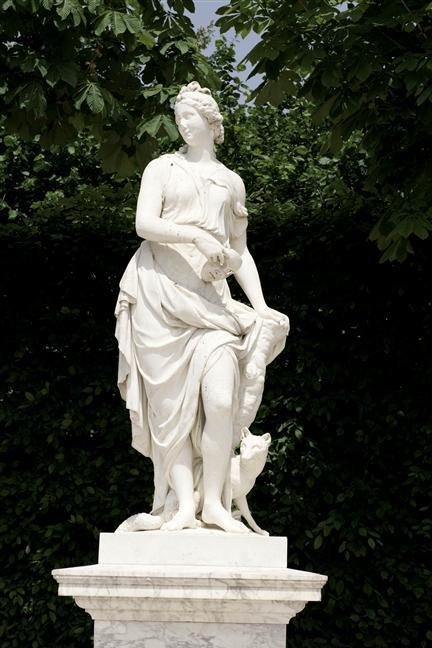
La Fourberie, following a drawing by Pierre Mignard, Jardins de Versailles

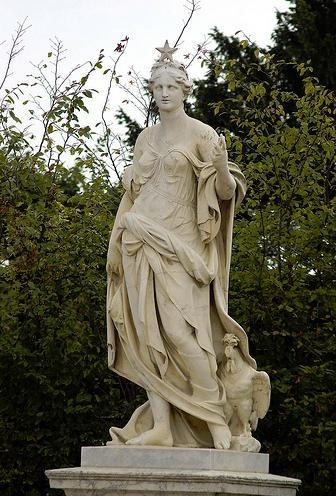
Aurora, or daybreak, by Gaspard Marsy, following a drawing by Charles Le Brun, Jardins de Versailles.

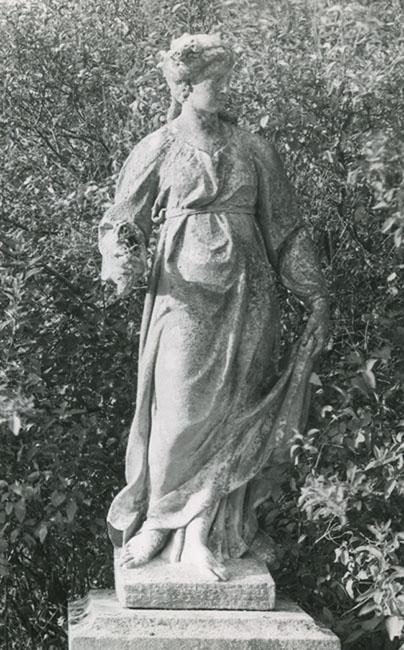
Flore, by Philippe Buyster (1595–1688)
Sculptures and furniture placed in the gallery at Meudon

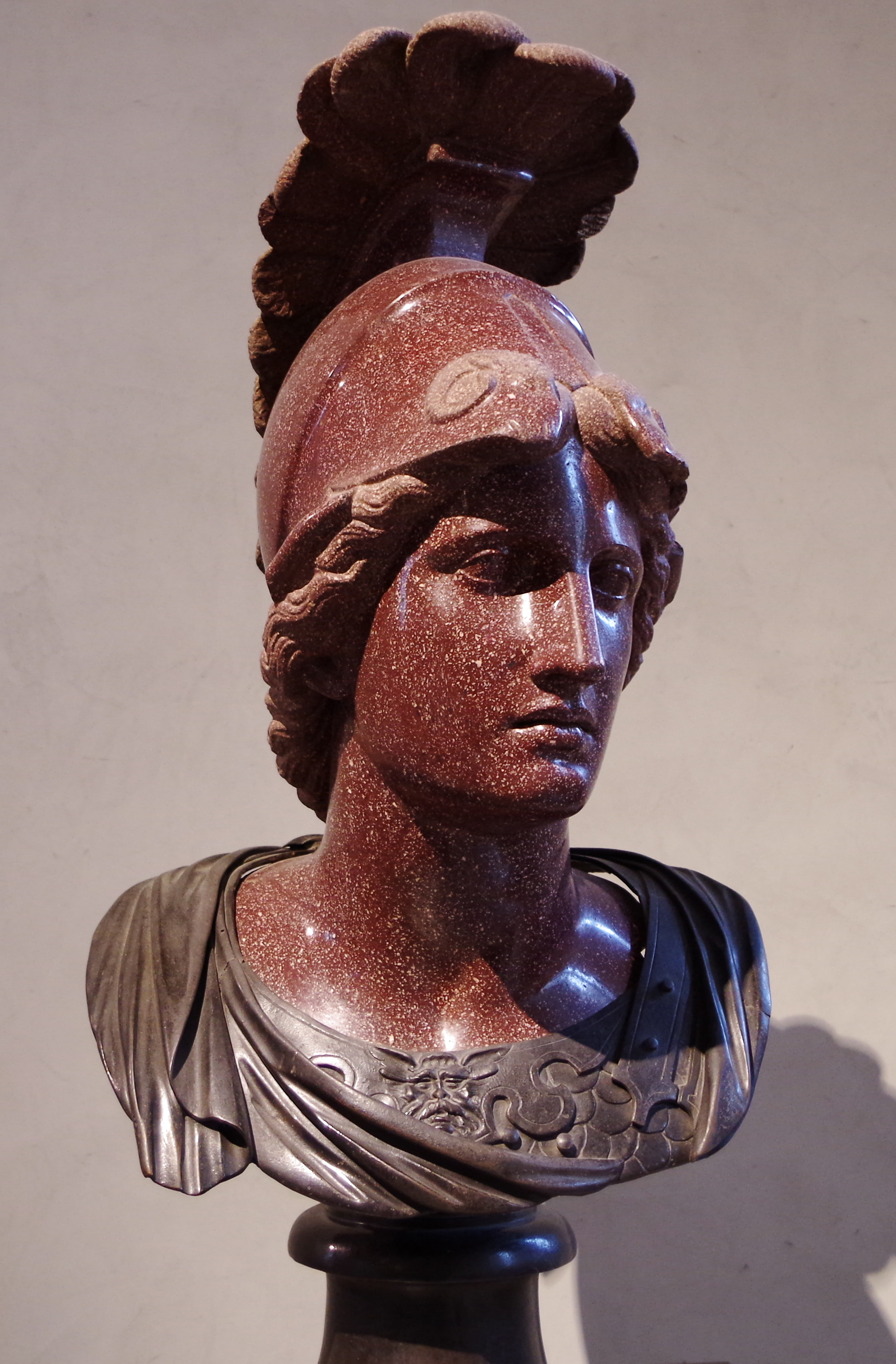
The Alexander of Mazarin. Musée du Louvre

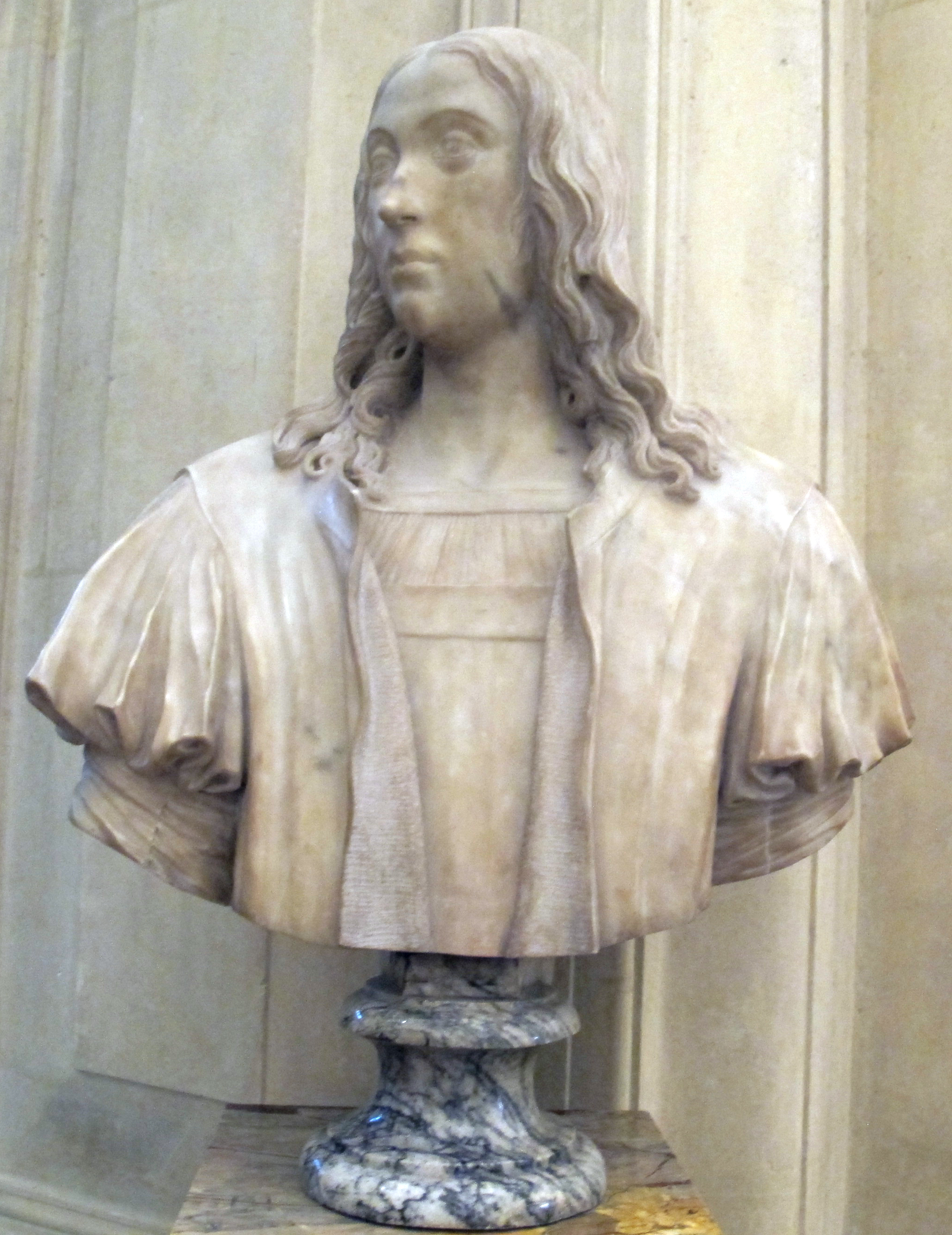
Bust of the painter Raphaël, by Alessandro Rondoni

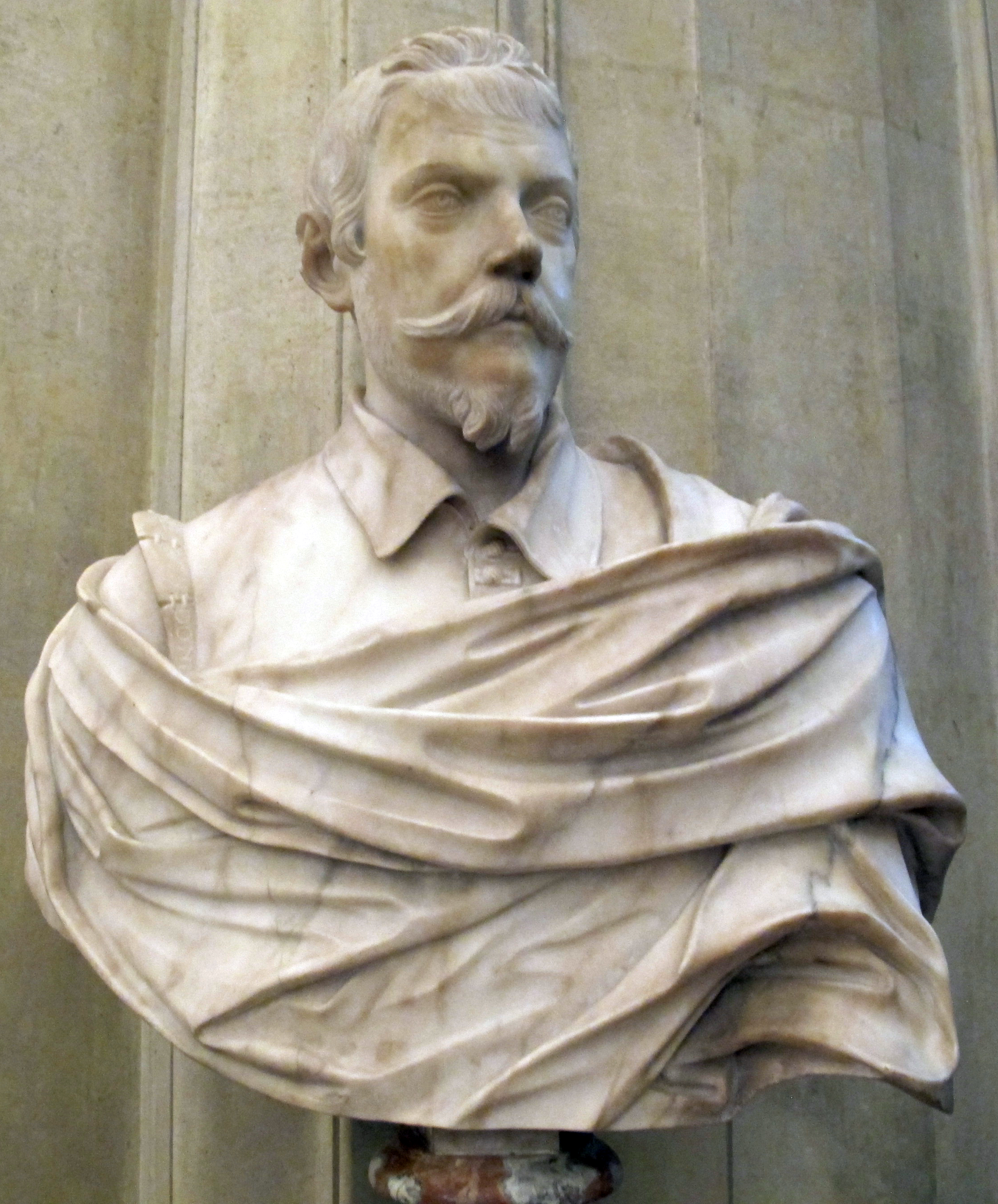
Bust of Annibal Carrache, by Alessandro Rondoni

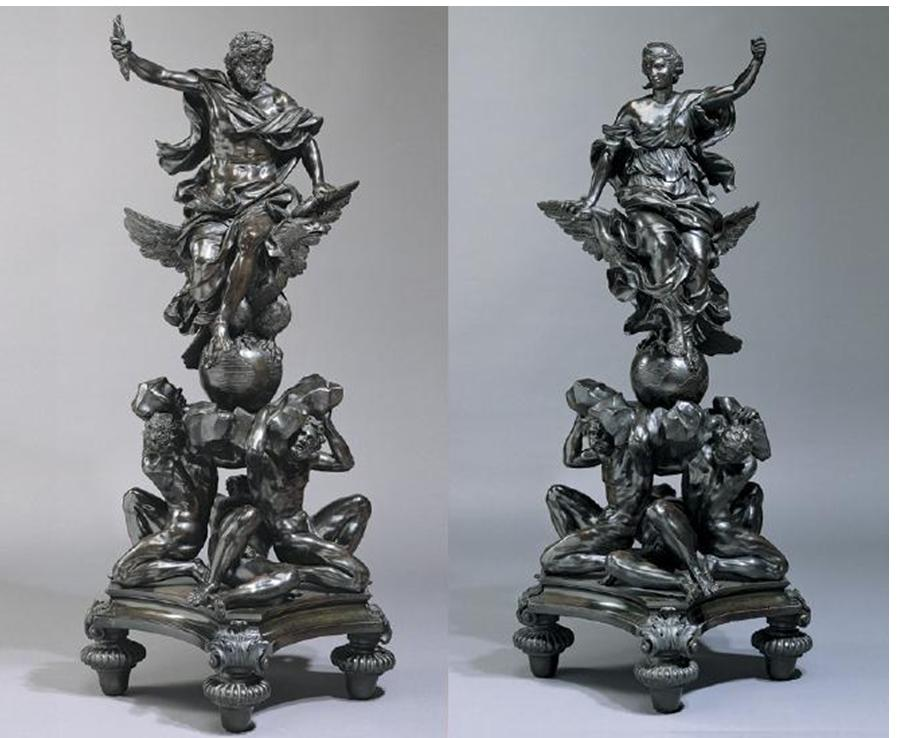
Jupiter and Junon, bronzes by the Algarde. Wallace Collection, London

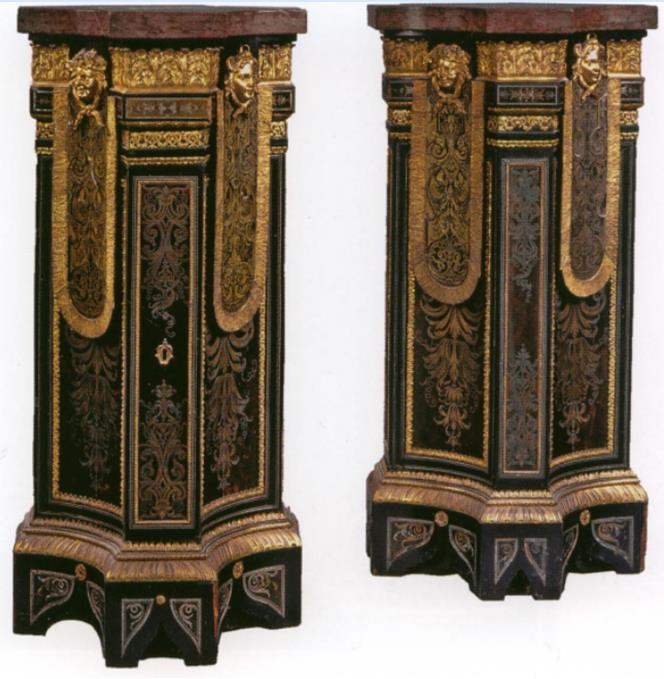
Octagonal pedestals placed in the gallery. Abbey of Chaalis

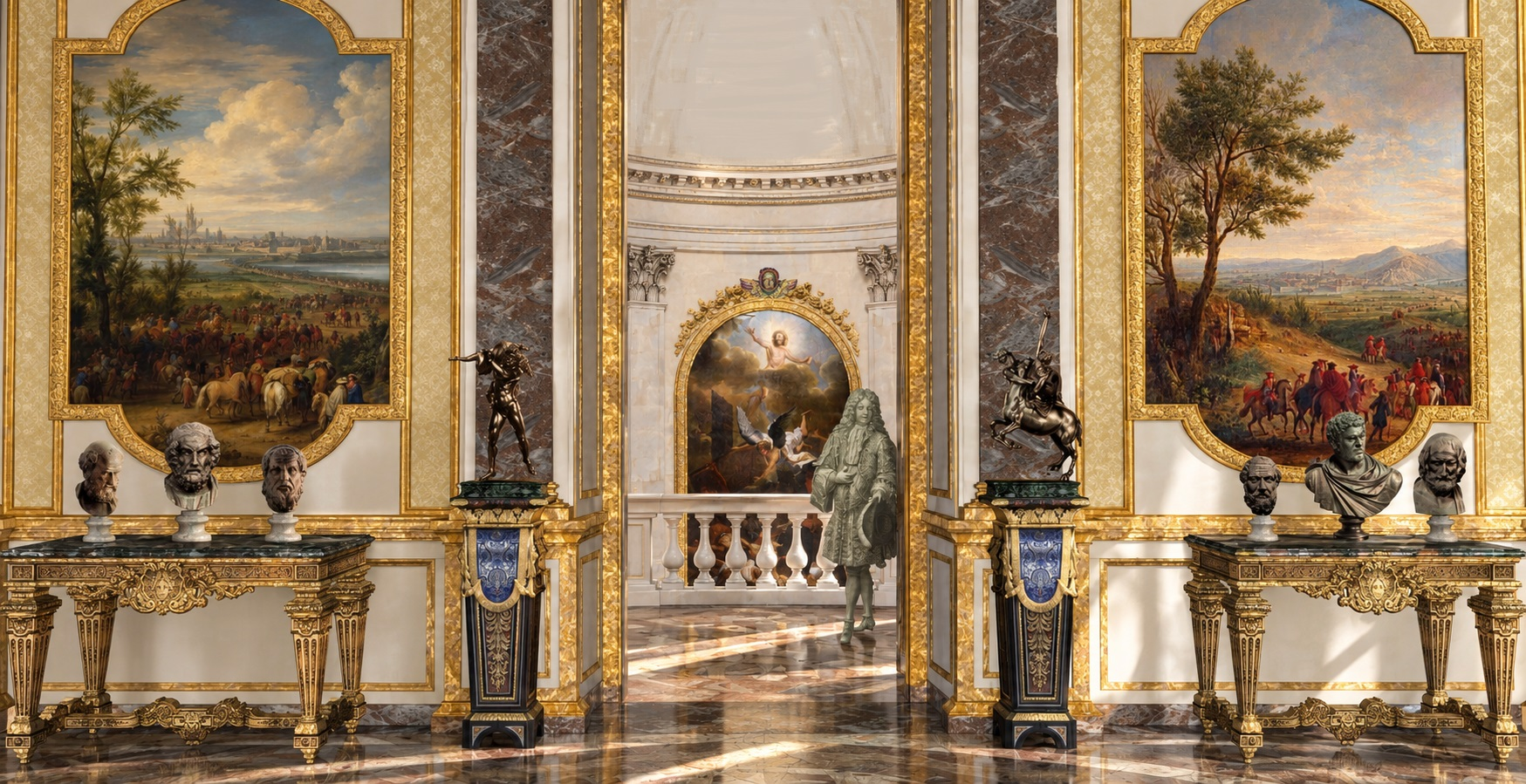
Draft reconstruction of the view of the chapel from the middle of the gallery, circa 1710

===== The Albane salon =====
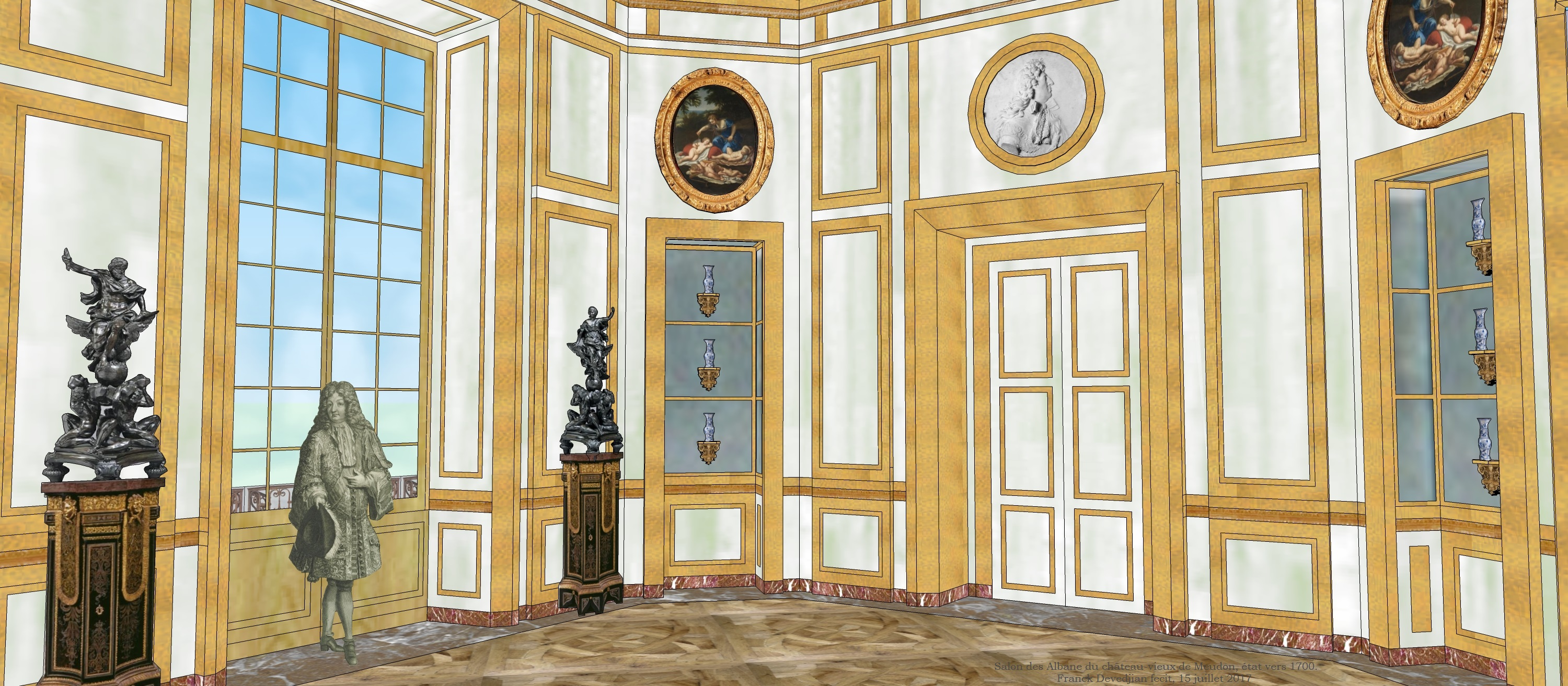
Salon Albane, at the end of the gallery of the Château-Vieux, first floor. Circa 1700

This chamber ends the gallery, and it is the pendant of the Salon du Petit Pont, in symmetry. The salon is named for the painter Francesco Albani, for several oval-shaped canvases had been placed in the corners, copies reinterpreted from the master's work. The architecture of the room, with its niches adorned with mirrors and its domed ceiling, was inspired directly by the Cabinet of the medals of Louis XIV at Versailles.

The dauphin will place there the great bronzes of L'Algarde, Jupiter and Juno.

===== The apartment said of Louis XIV =====
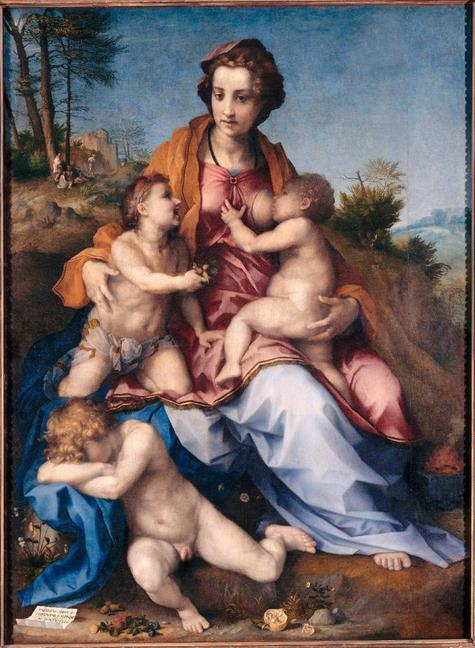
Charity, by Andrea del Sarto, Musée du Louvre. In the chamber of Louis XIV

At the end of the 19th century, Louis XIV's apartment consisted of an antechamber, a royal chamber, a small passageway to the rear, That of a "cabinet of the mirrors of the King", which had a balcony allowing to admire the view on Paris.

====== Council antechamber ======
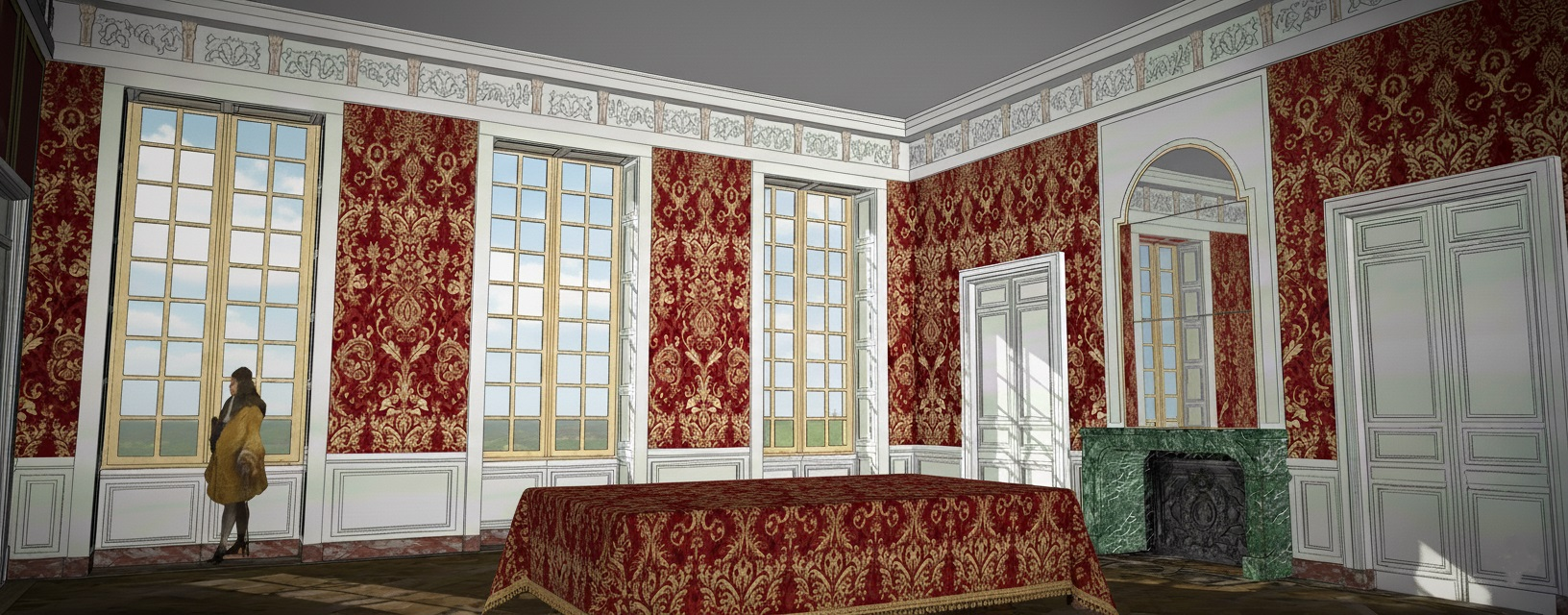
Reconstruction of the antichamber of Louis XIV on the first floor of the château-vieux, used as a council chamber. Circa 1696–1711. As seen leaving the king's chamber

This room without woodwork had three windows on the side of the floor and two French windows on the side of the courtyard allowing access to the balcony. The mantelpiece was of Campanian green marble.

====== The bedroom of Louis XIV in Meudon ======
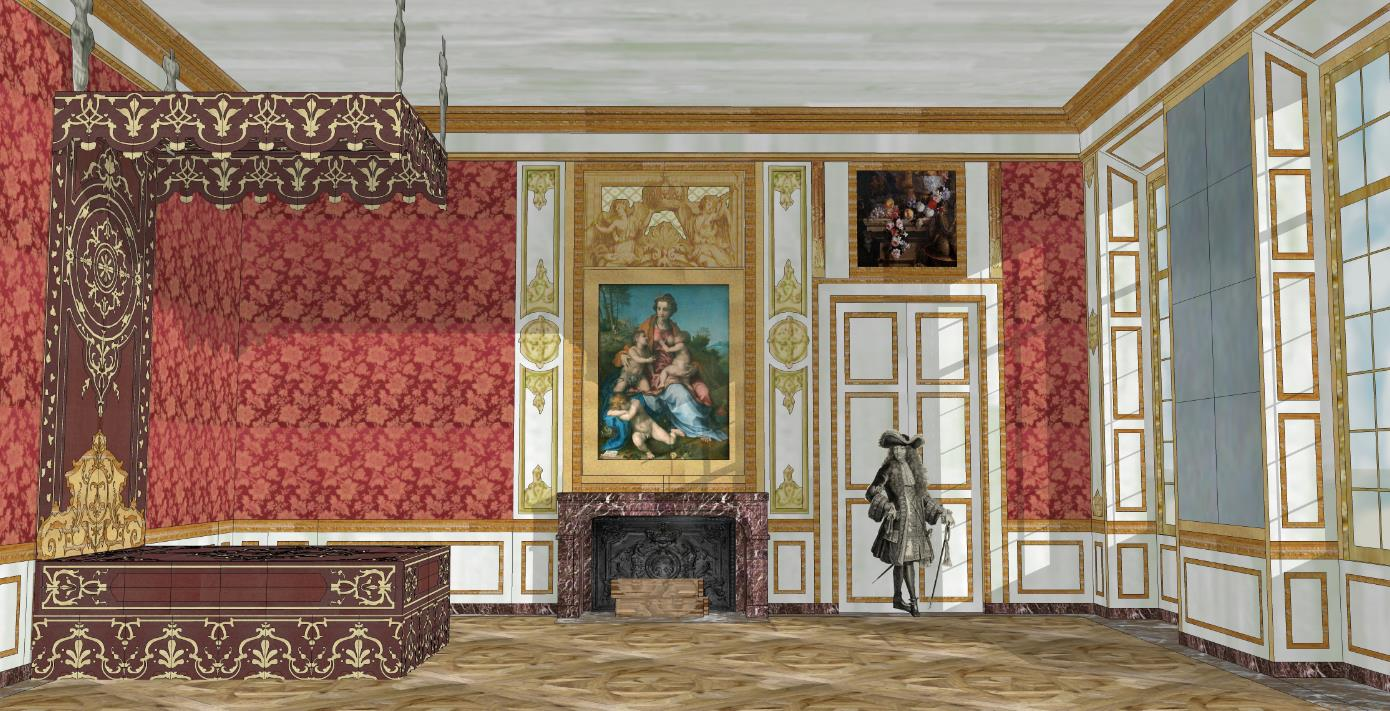
Cutaway of the chamber of Louis XIV, château-vieux de Meudon, ca. 1700.

Above the fireplace in the king's chamber hung the original of "Charity" by Andrea del Sarto, then a copy of this painting. This work can be interpreted as an allegory of the transmission of royal power.

====== The cabinet of the mirrors of the king ======
Le Cabinet des Glaces du Roi, c. 1697 to 1793. Archives nationales, O1 1768 A 1 et 2.

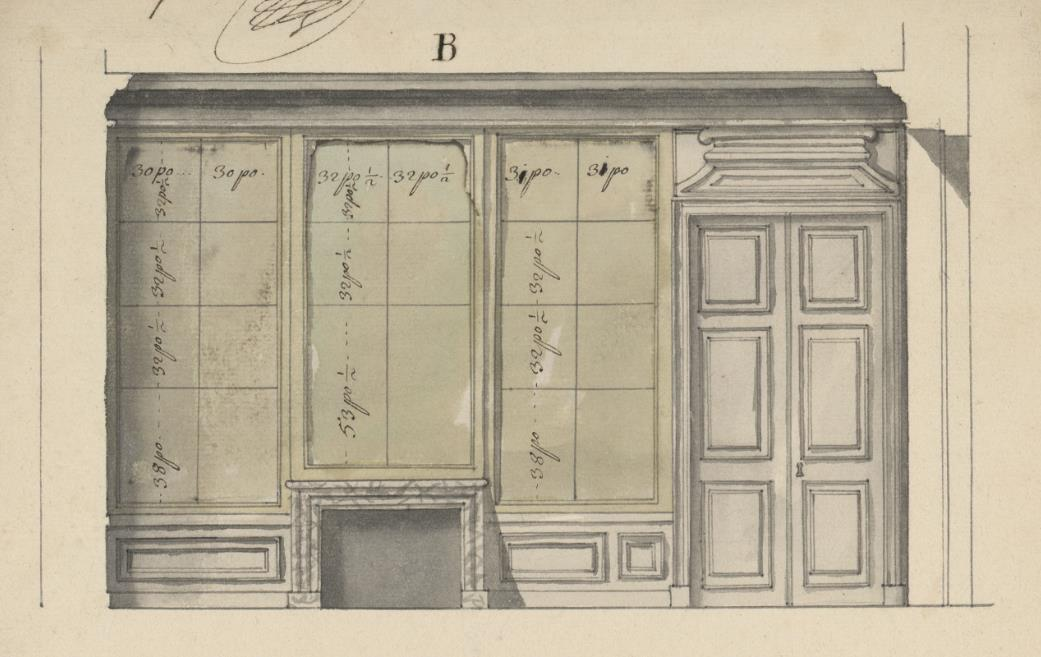
Elévation de la paroi Nord.

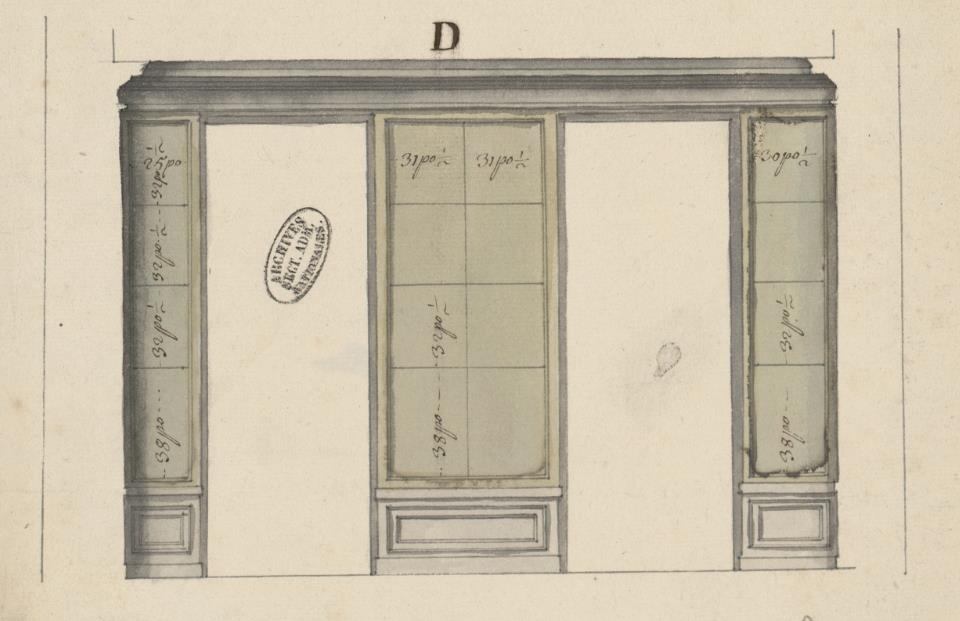
Elévation de la paroi Est.

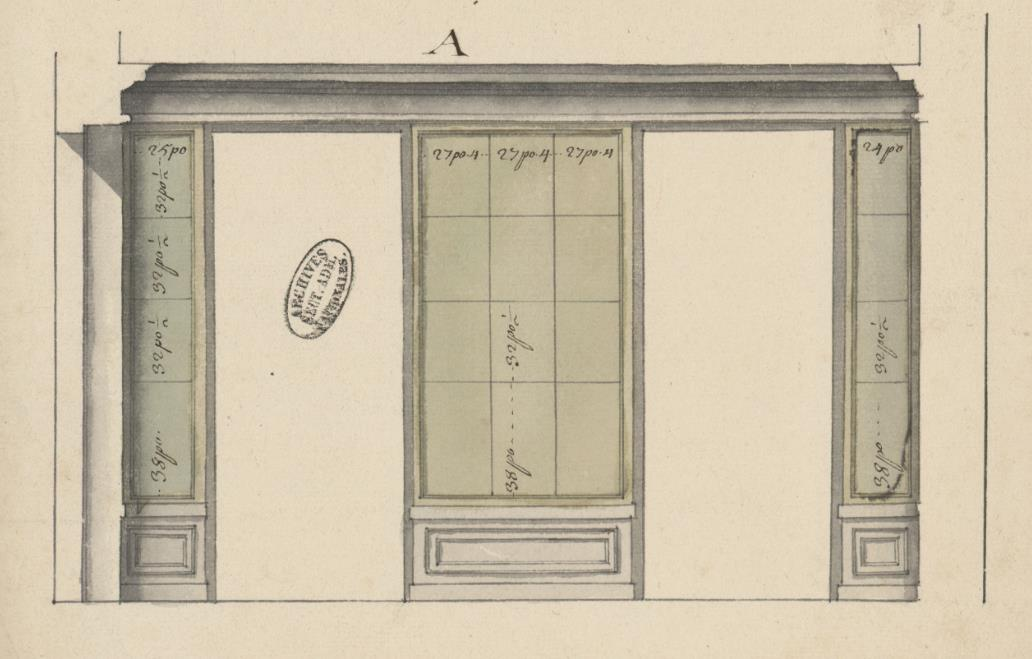
Elévation de la paroi Sud.

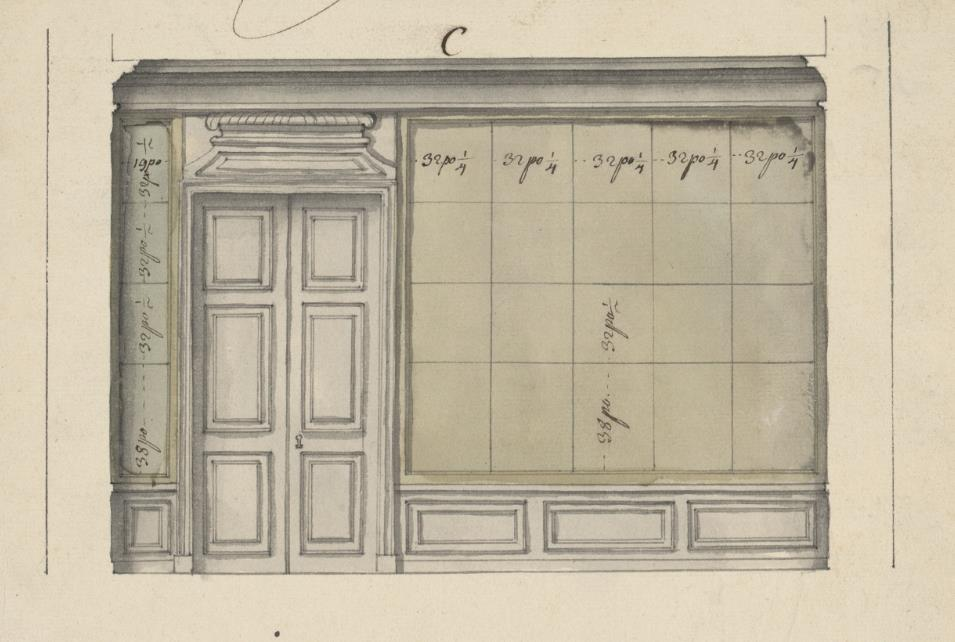
Elévation de la paroi Ouest.

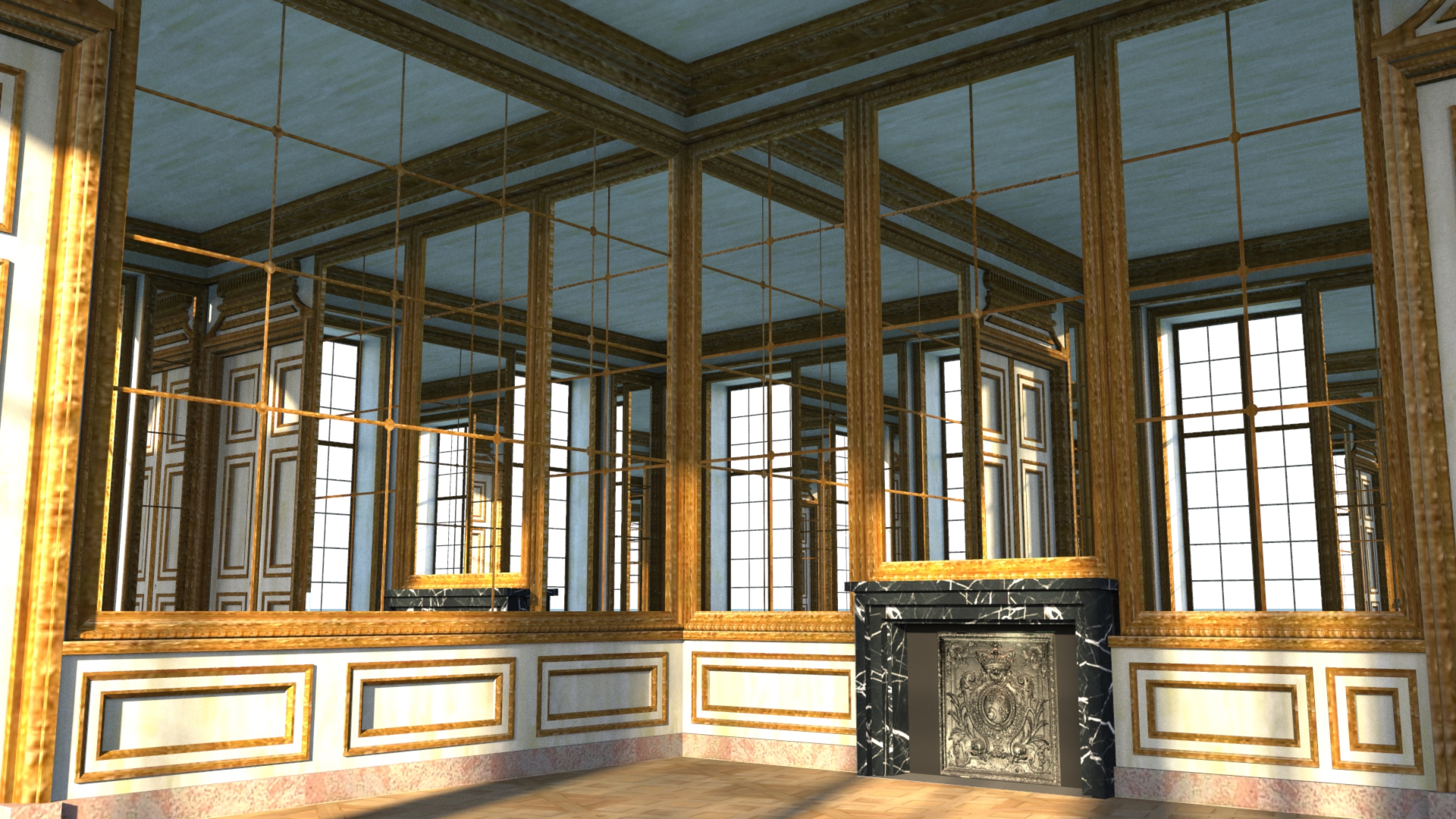
Restitution 3D du Cabinet des glaces de Louis XIV, Franck Devedjian & Hervé Grégoire, janvier 2013.

===== Apartment of Madame de Maintenon =====
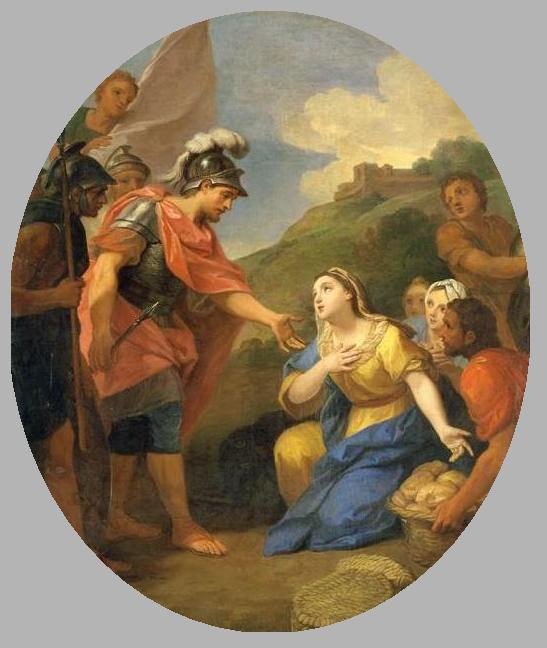
David et Abigail, by Louis de Boullogne, musée du Louvre, inv. 8548.

Madame de Maintenon's apartment consisted of an antechamber, a bedroom, and a closet in the center of the east wing, as well as a balcony with a view of Paris. In the cabinet of Maintenon, there was a painting above the door of David and Abigail, painted by Louis de Boullogne.

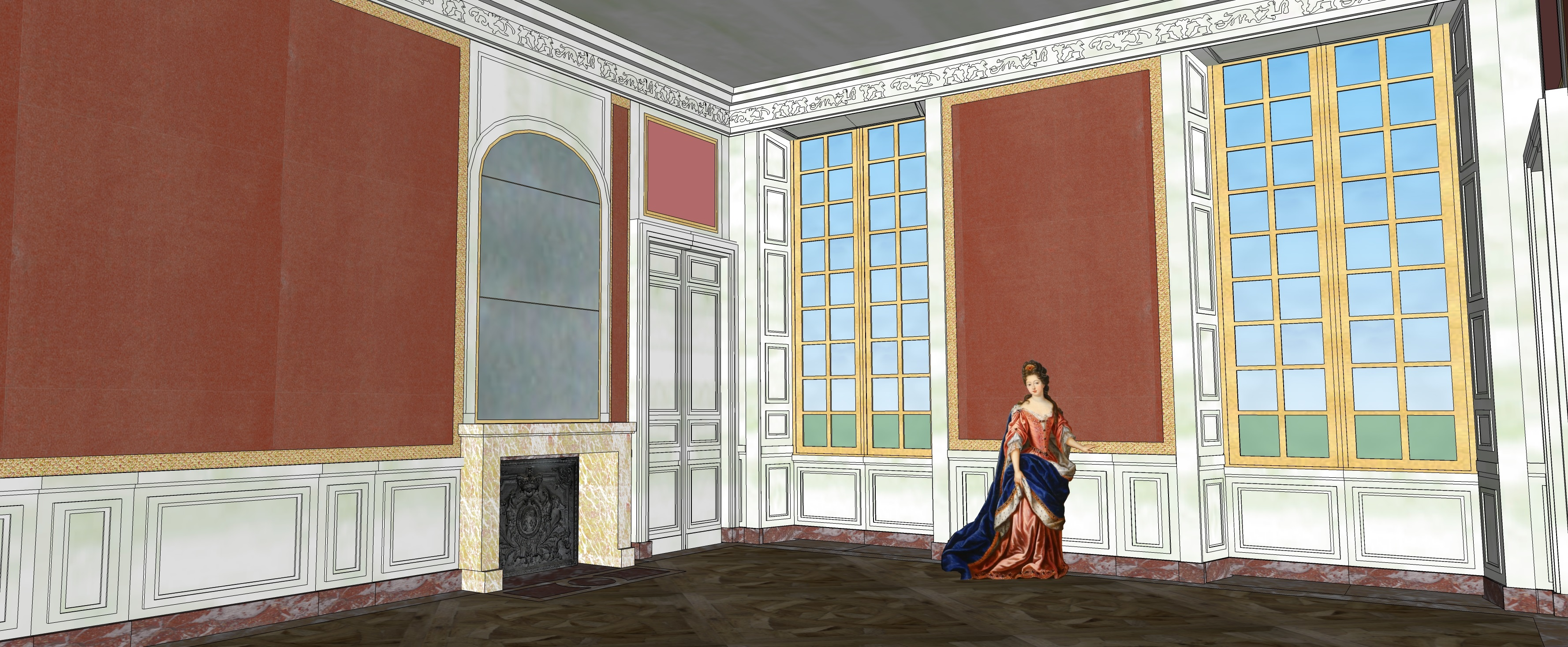
Antechamber of M^{me} de Maintenon, c. 1700

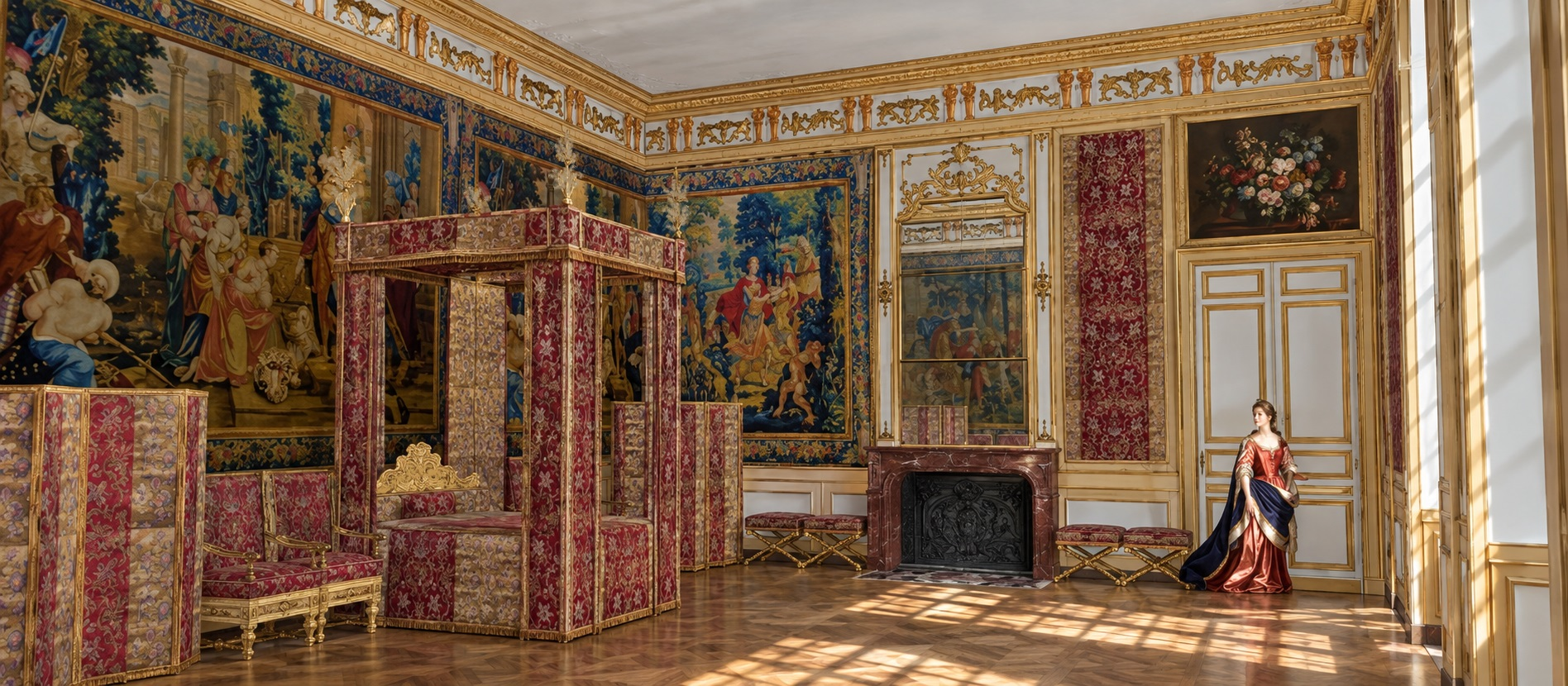
Chamber of Mme de Maintenon, 1700–1711

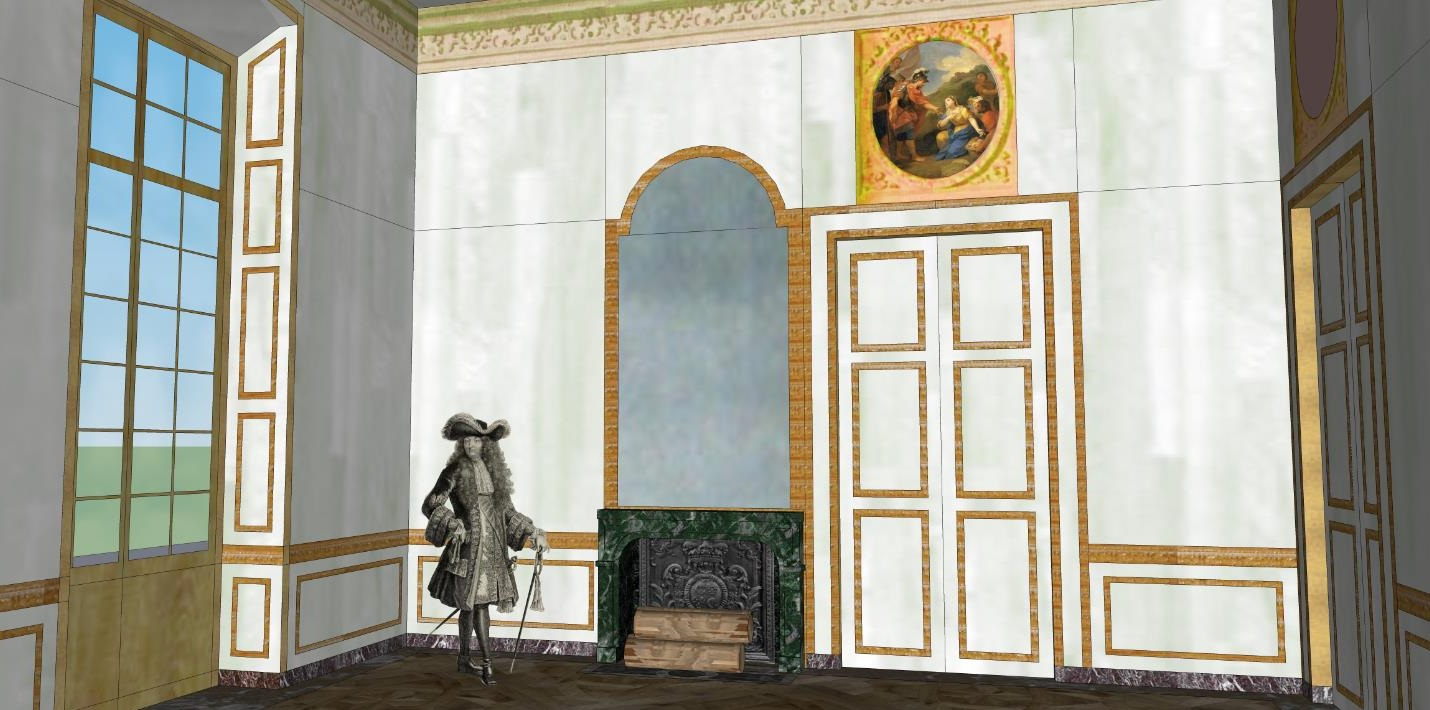
Cabinet of M^{me} de Maintenon, c. 1700

===== Apartment of the Princess of Conti =====
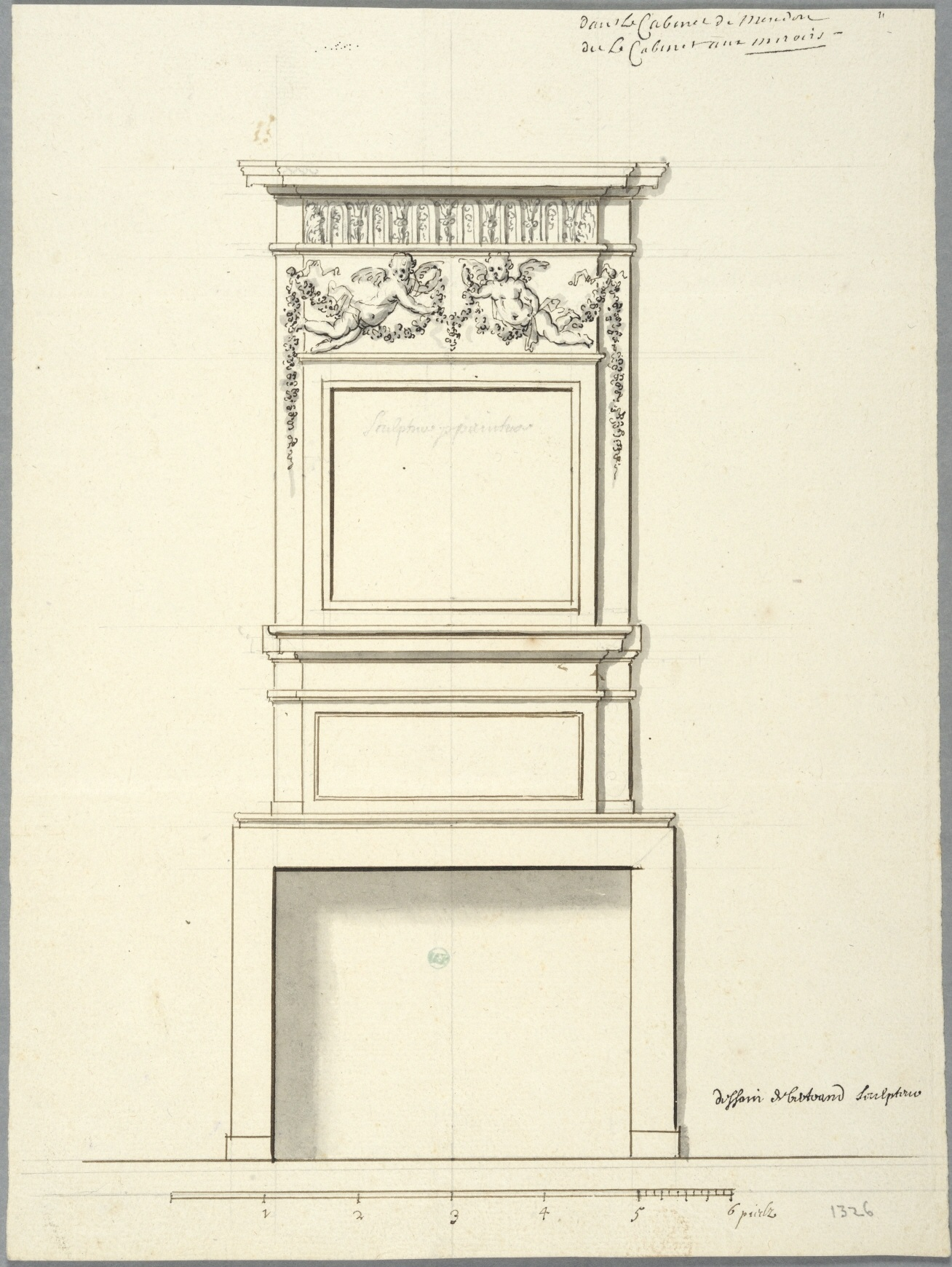
Projet de cheminée du cabinet des miroirs de Meudon, vers 1680 ? Nationalmuseum de Stockholm, NMH THC 1326

Afterwards, the apartment of the Princess of Conti followed and ended with another "Cabinet des mirroirs".

In the Princess room were two paintings by Antoine Coypel, Psyche discovering Sleeping Love, and Psyche abandoned by Love

In the adjoining cabinet was placed the painting entitled "Venus at the Forges of Lemnos", by the same painter. These three works were commissioned by Monseigneur for the apartment of his half-sister.

Canvases in the apartment of the Princess of Conti by Antoine Coypel, 1701

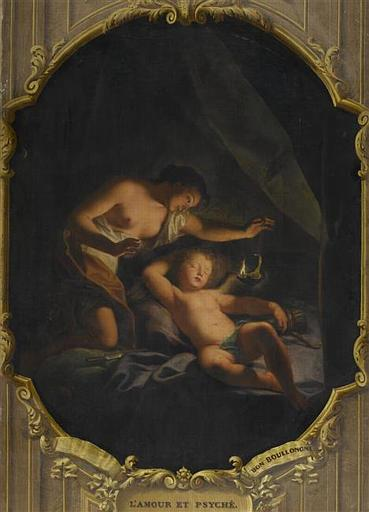
Psyché découvrant l'Amour endormi, Antoine Coypel, 1701

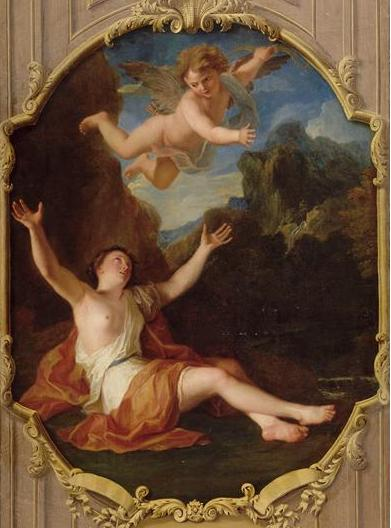
Psyche Abandoned, Antoine Coypel, 1701

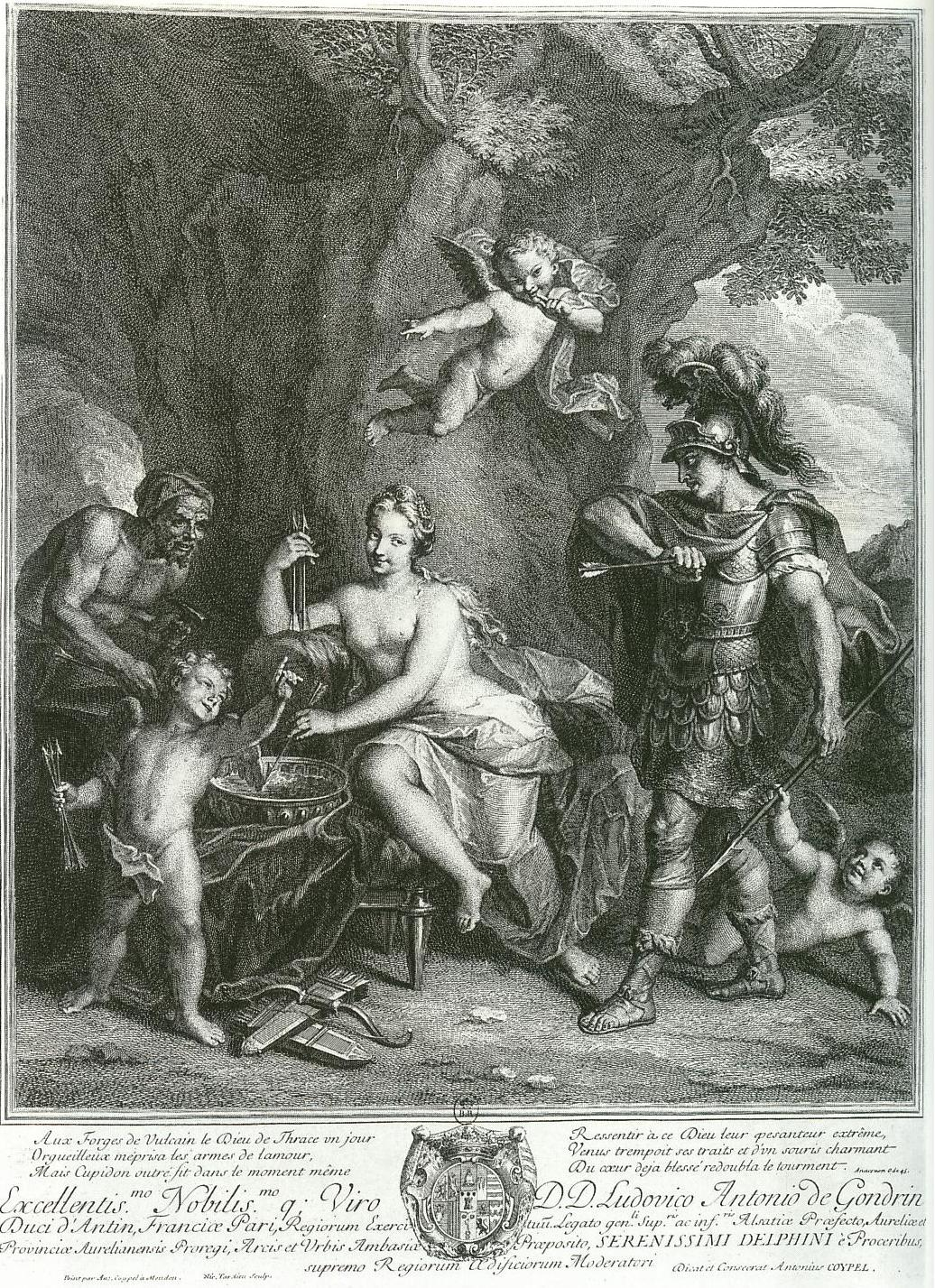
Vénus aux forges de Lemnos, Antoine Coypel. 1701

=== Chapel ===
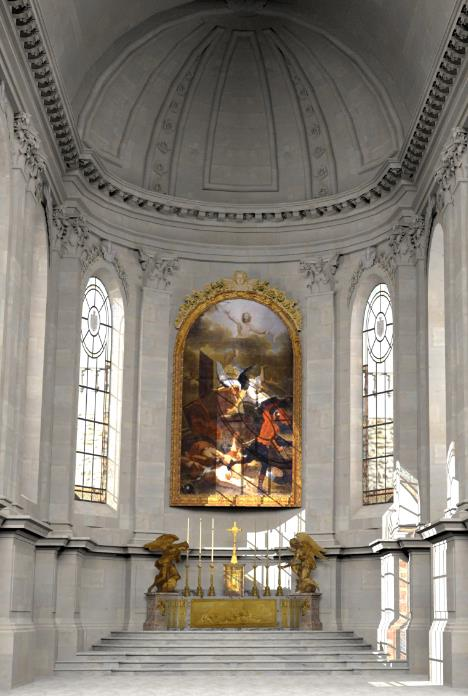
3D recreation of the interior of the chapel at Meudon. Franck Devedjian and Hervé Grégoire, 2014

The chapel was completed at the end of 1702, on the plans of Jules Hardouin-Mansart. This construction, desired by Monseigneur, was aimed at by Louis XIV. This chapel follows the same model as the Royal Chapel at the Palace of Versailles. However, the chapel of Meudon was completed a decade before that of Versailles. Like the latter, it has a barrel-vaulted nave ending in a cul-de-four above the sanctuary. Above the high altar is a large painting of Antoine Coypel, four meters high, eighty-five by three wide, which features the "Resurrection". Charles de La Fosse modelled this composition to undertake the painting of the kiln furnace of the royal chapel of Versailles. Another painting by Coypel, The Annunciation, completes the set.

The arms carved above the tribune are royal weapons on the drawing projecting the chapel, but will eventually be realized according to the model of weapons delphinales. The architectural theorist, Jacques-François Blondel, cites as an example, with the chapels of the Châteaux de Sceaux and Clagny "Perfect models".

It will be destroyed between 1805 and 1808.

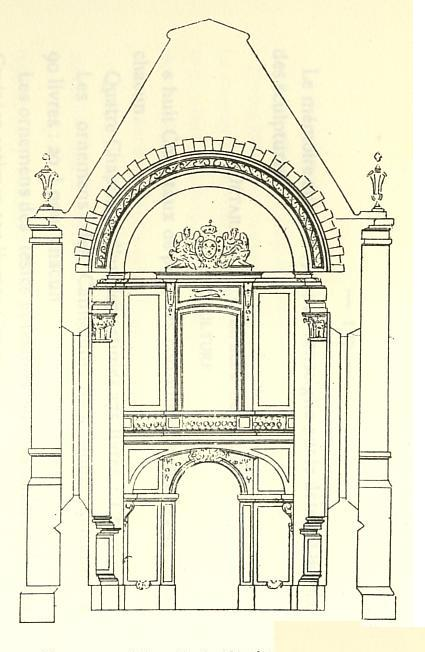
Coupe de la tribune of the chapel of the château de Meudon, 1701

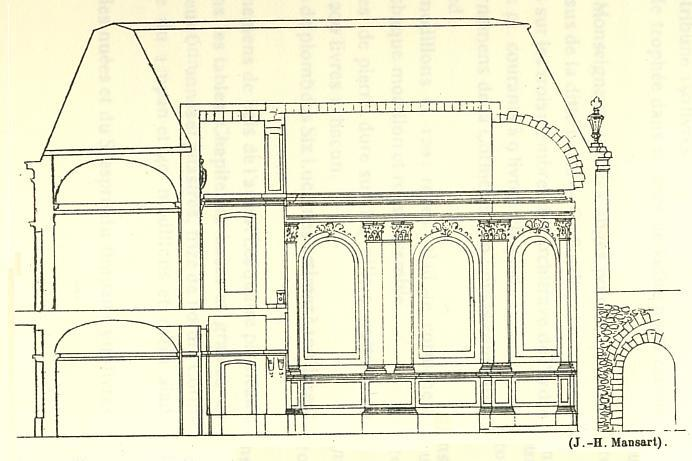
Projet non définitif de coupe of the chapel of Meudon. Dessin de Jules Hardouin-Mansart, 1701. AN.

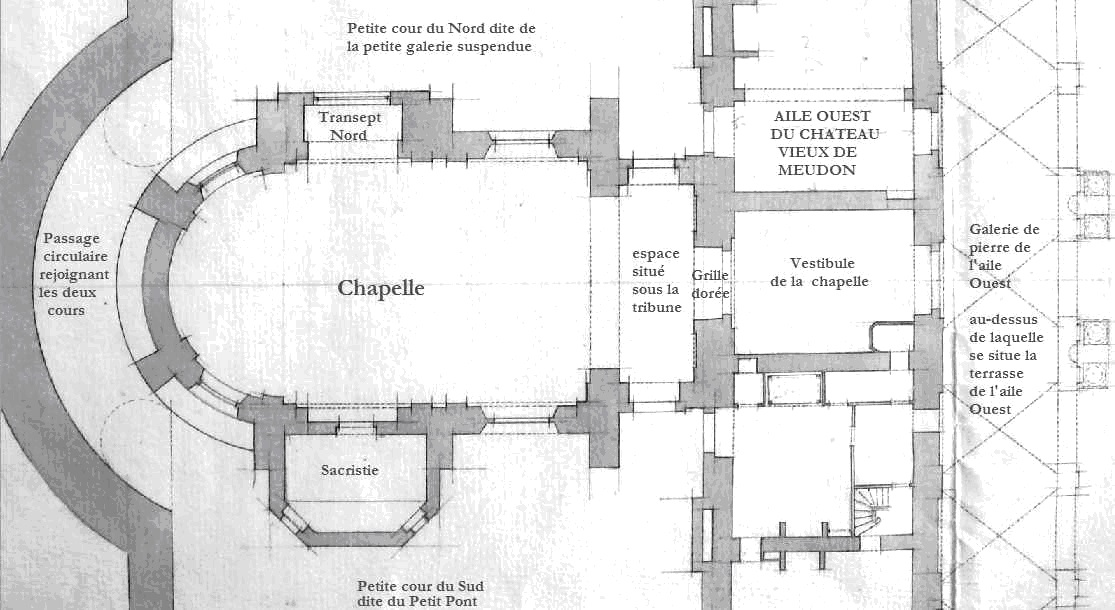
Plan définitif of the chapel of Meudon, circa 1775–1780. AN

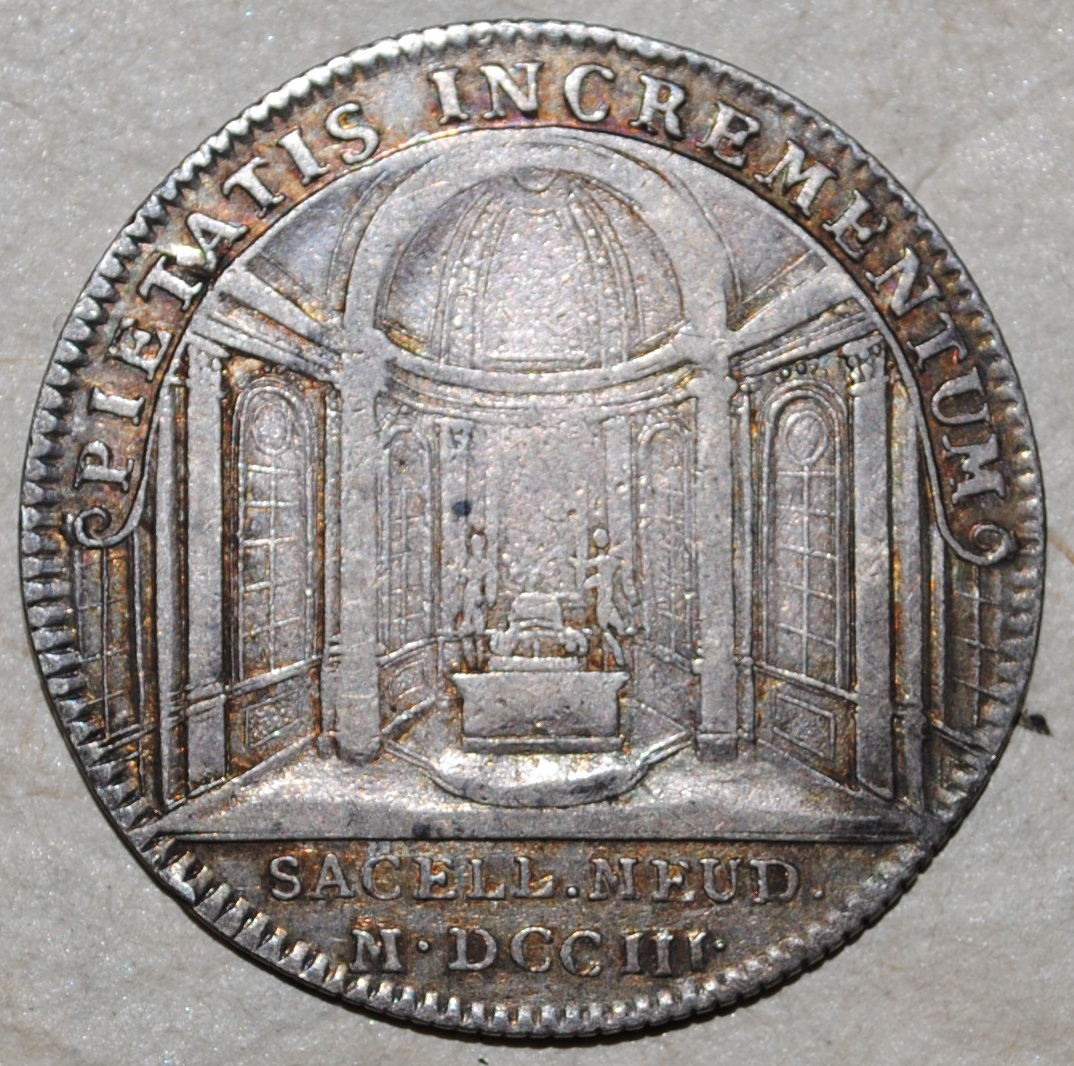
Jeton representing the interior of the chapel of the château of Meudon, seen from the tribune, 1703. Private collection

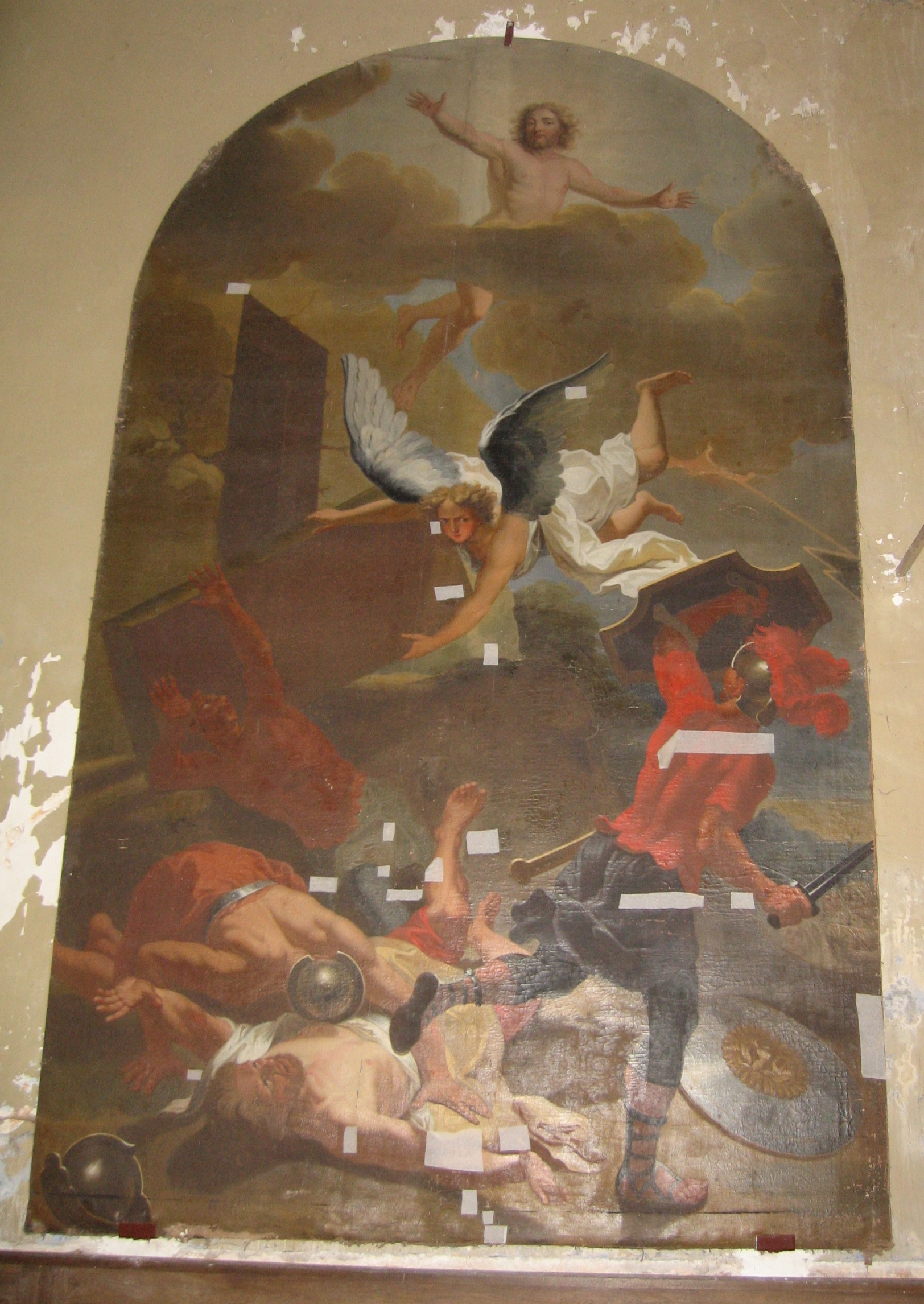
Copy of Résurrection by Antoine Coypel, chapel of Vernon

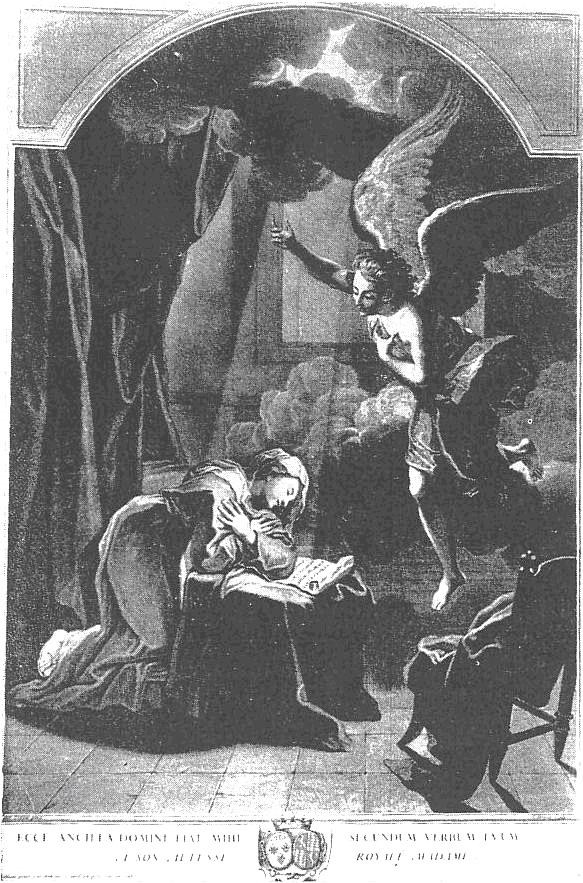
L'Annonciation, by Antoine Coypel. Estampe de Drevet

=== Chestnut Tree Wing ===
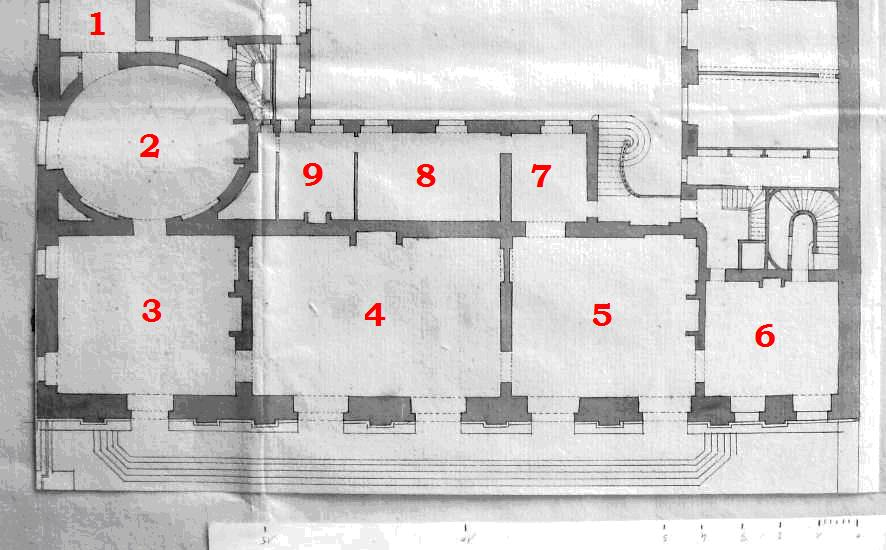
Plan of the apartment of the chestnut trees, circa 1703 (ADY). Caption: 1. communication gallery; 2. Large Oval Cabinet; 3. Large Corner Cabinet; 4. Large Living Room; 5. Dining room; 6. Buffet cabinet; 7. Antechamber of the Small Apartment Fresh; 8. House; 9.Cabinet.

The old "Cour des Offices", or "Basse Cour", was transformed by Monseigneur to create luxurious ceremonial rooms. The entire annex then took the name of "Wing of the Marronniers". The large reception rooms extend the width of the Terrasse des Marronniers. A small, luxurious apartment, the "Small Fresh Apartment", was also arranged behind these large rooms, no doubt for the Dauphin to receive his mistresses.

==== Small hanging gallery ====
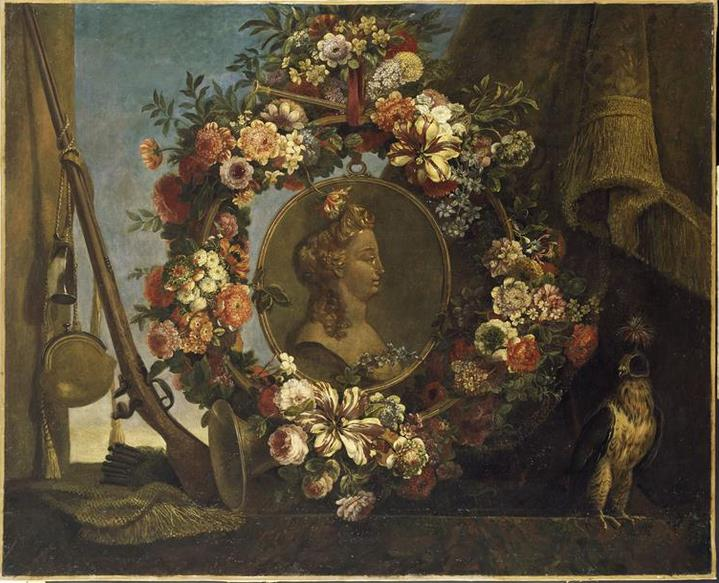
Still life with profile of Diana by Blin de Fontenay

This gallery links to the communicating gallery which follows it perpendicularly. A large buffet painted by Fontenay completes the perspective of the small suspended gallery.

==== Communicating gallery ====
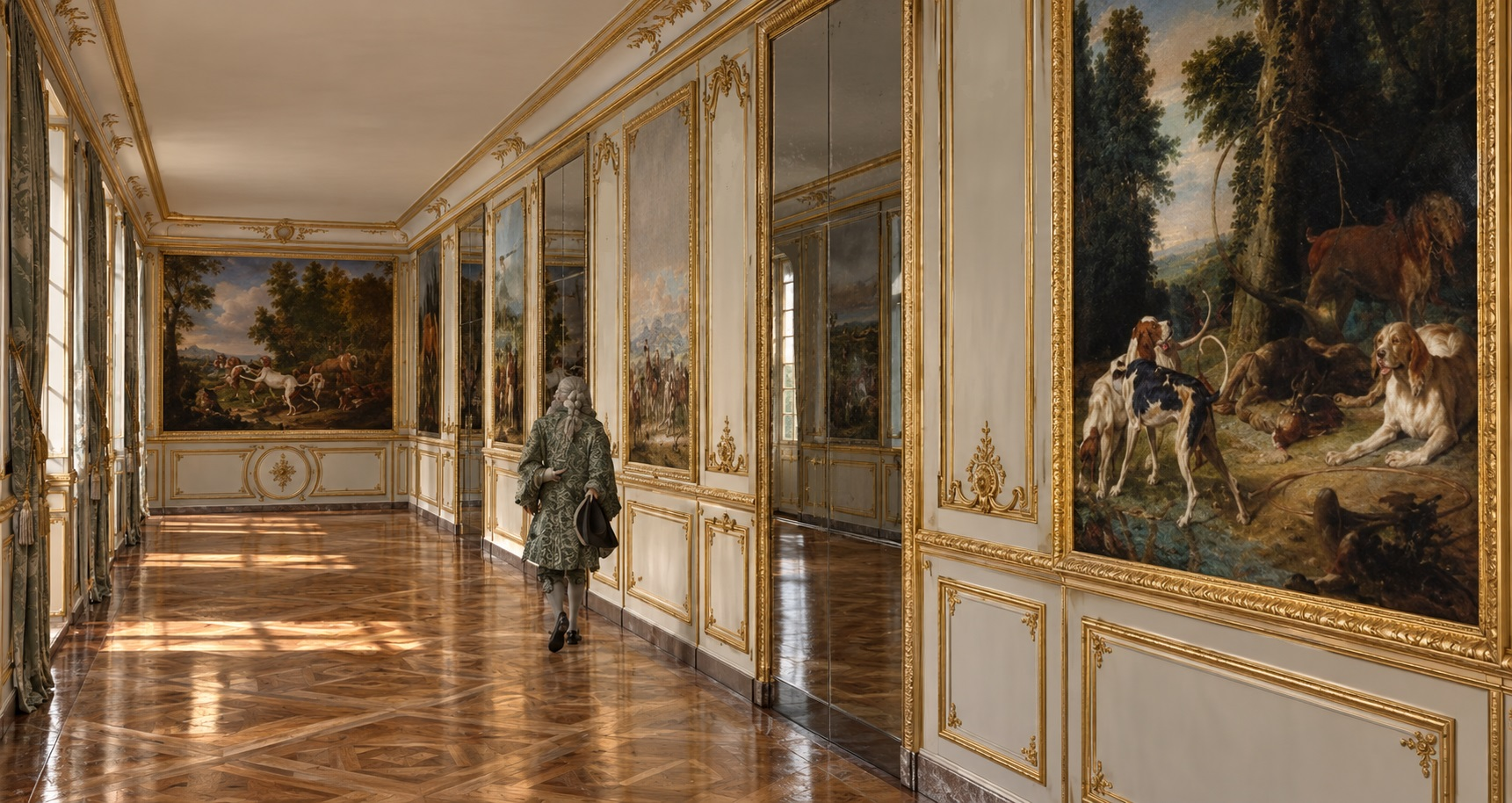
communicating gallery, chestnut tree wing, c. 1703–1711.

This room is decorated with large paintings by François Desportes, commissioned for the chamber, and which would make the painter's success.

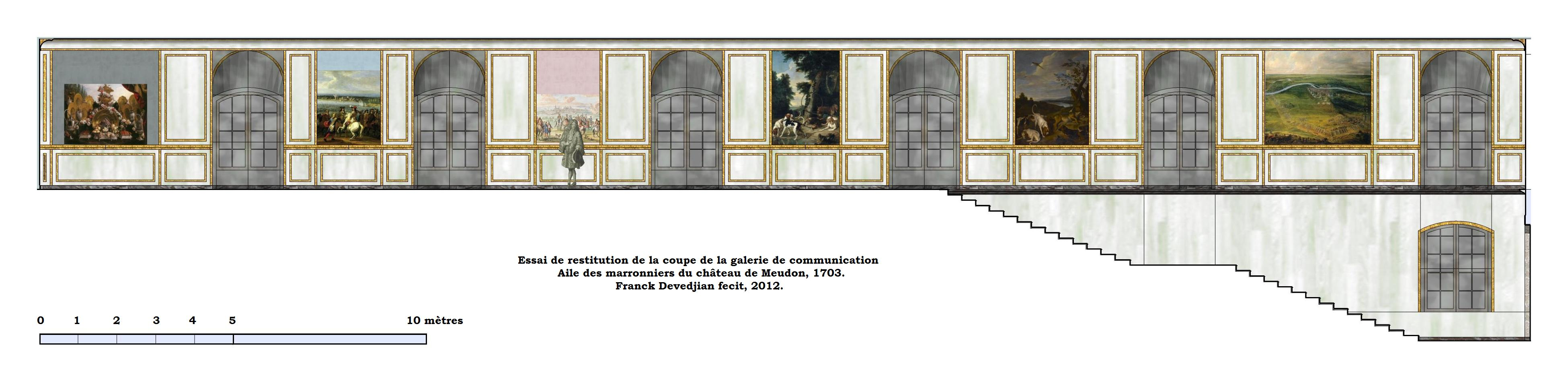
Communicating gallery, Chestnut tree wing, c. 1703. Reconstruction by Franck Devedjian, 2012
François Desportes canvasses commissioned for the communicating gallery, 1703

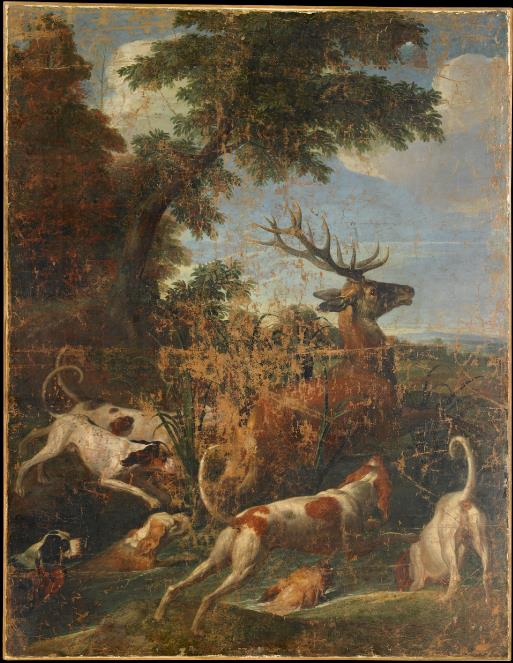
Un cerf poursuivi par des chiens (Stag Pursued by Dogs), François Desportes, 1703

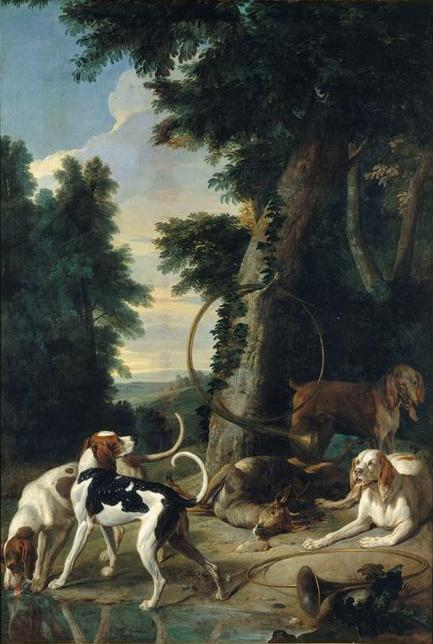
La mort d'un chevreuil (Death of a deer), François Desportes, 1703

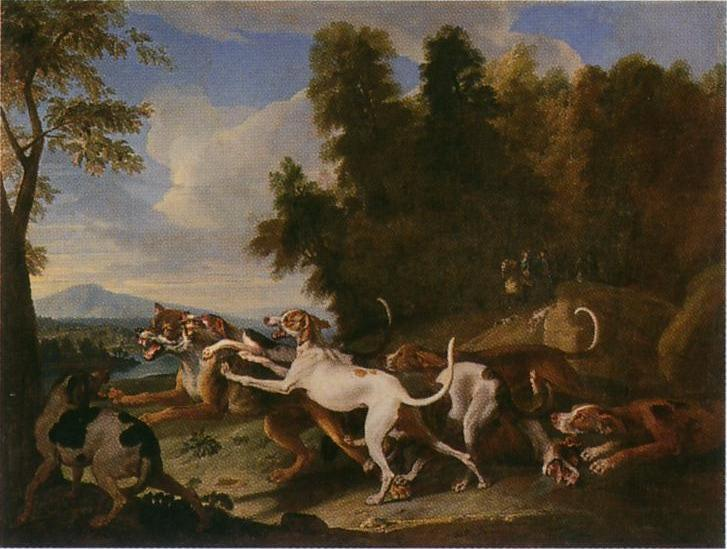
La meute de Monseigneur (Hounds of Monseigneur), 1703, Musée de Gien

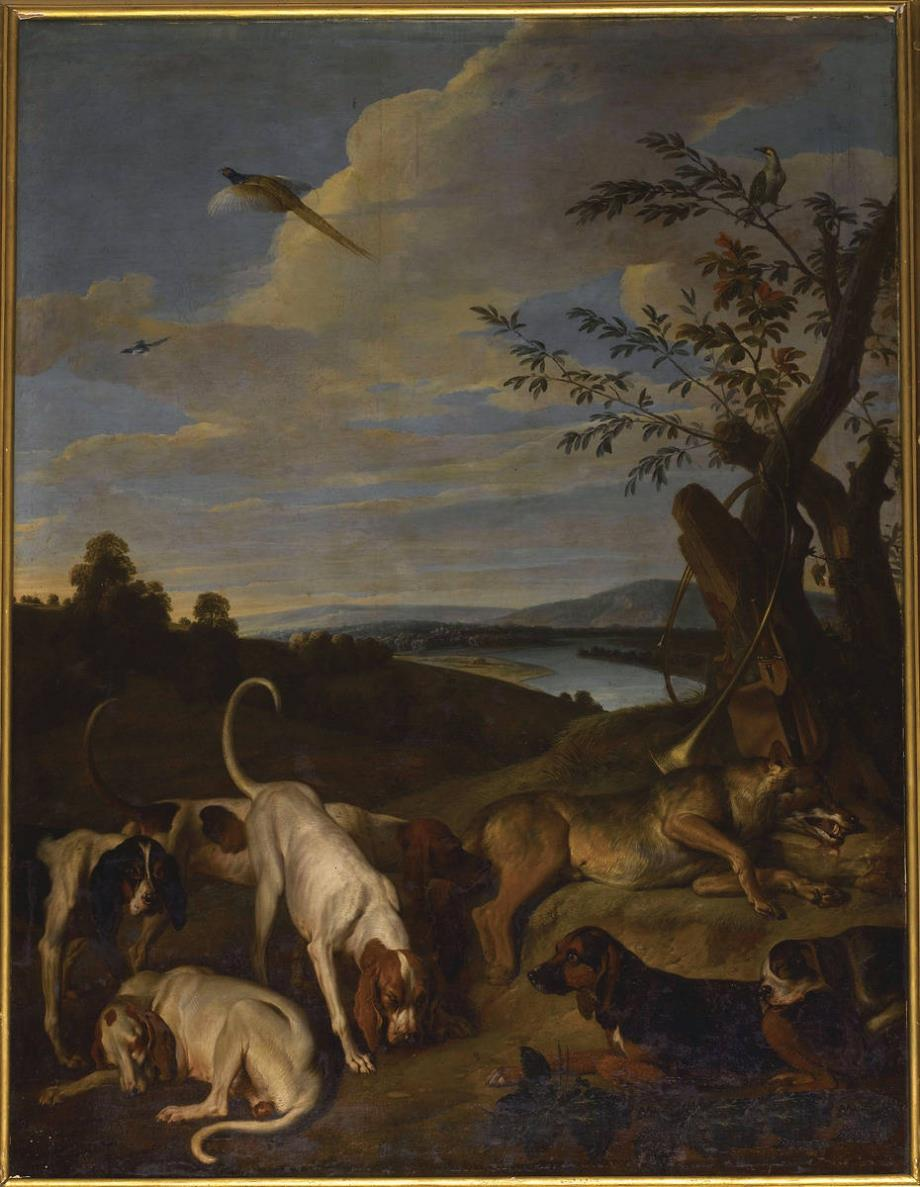
La mort du loup (Death of the wolf), François Desportes, 1703

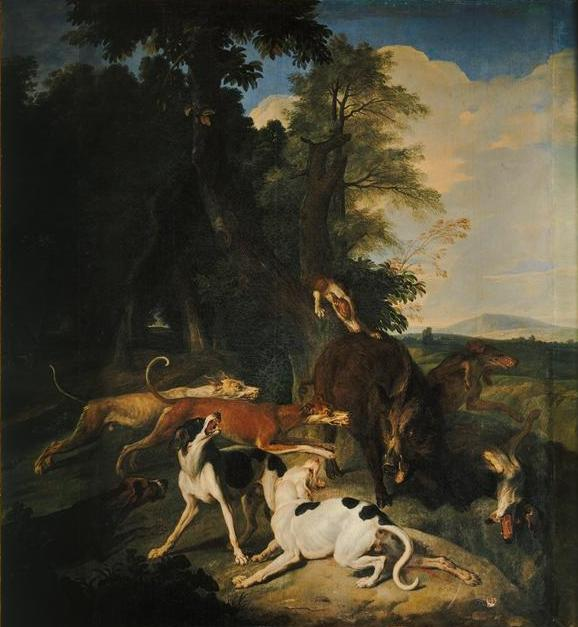
Un sanglier chassé par huit chiens (A Boar Chased by Eight Dogs), François Desportes. 1703

==== Large oval cabinet ====
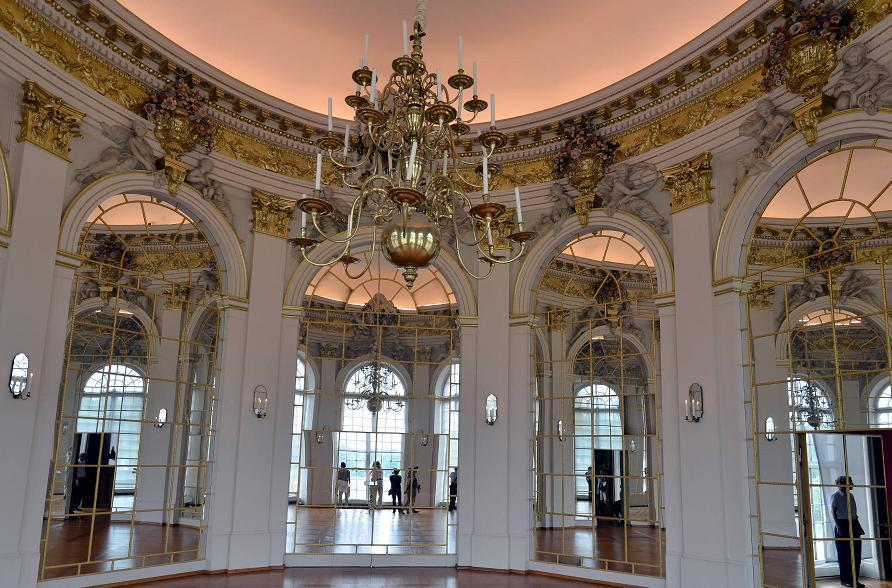
Chamber of mirrors in Charlottenburg Palace, Germany, contemporaneous with the Grand Cabinet Ovale, similar in its layout, size and systematic use of mirrors

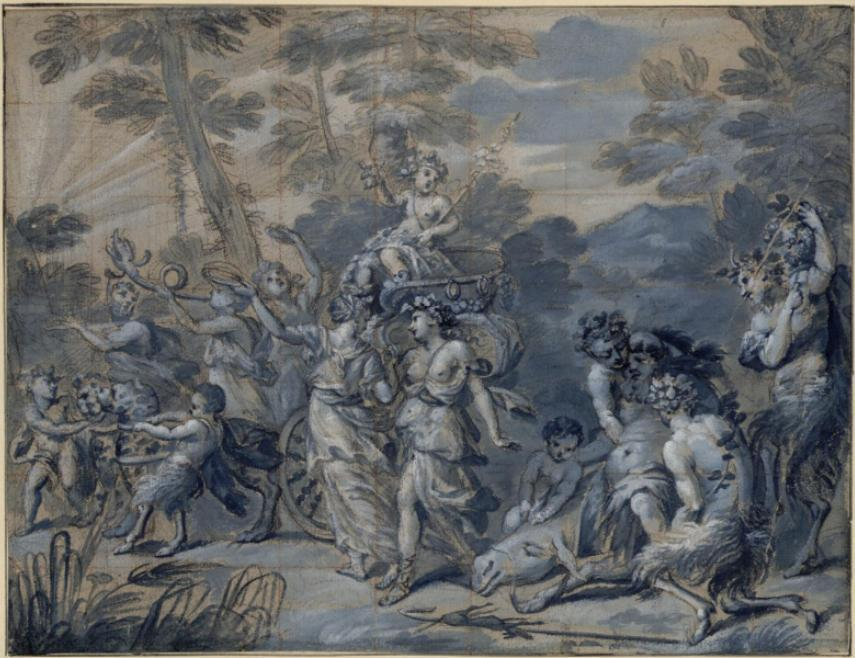
Preparatory drawing for the Triomphe de Bacchus, attributed to Louis de Boullogne. Albertina Museum, Vienna (Austria)

Also called the "Salon doré" (golden salon) where hung the "Triumph of Bacchus" by Bon Boullogne. The painting disappeared, but a preparatory drawing, preserved at the Albertina Museum (Vienna), and attributed to his brother Louis, allows us to understand what the composition of this work might look like.

==== Large corner cabinet ====
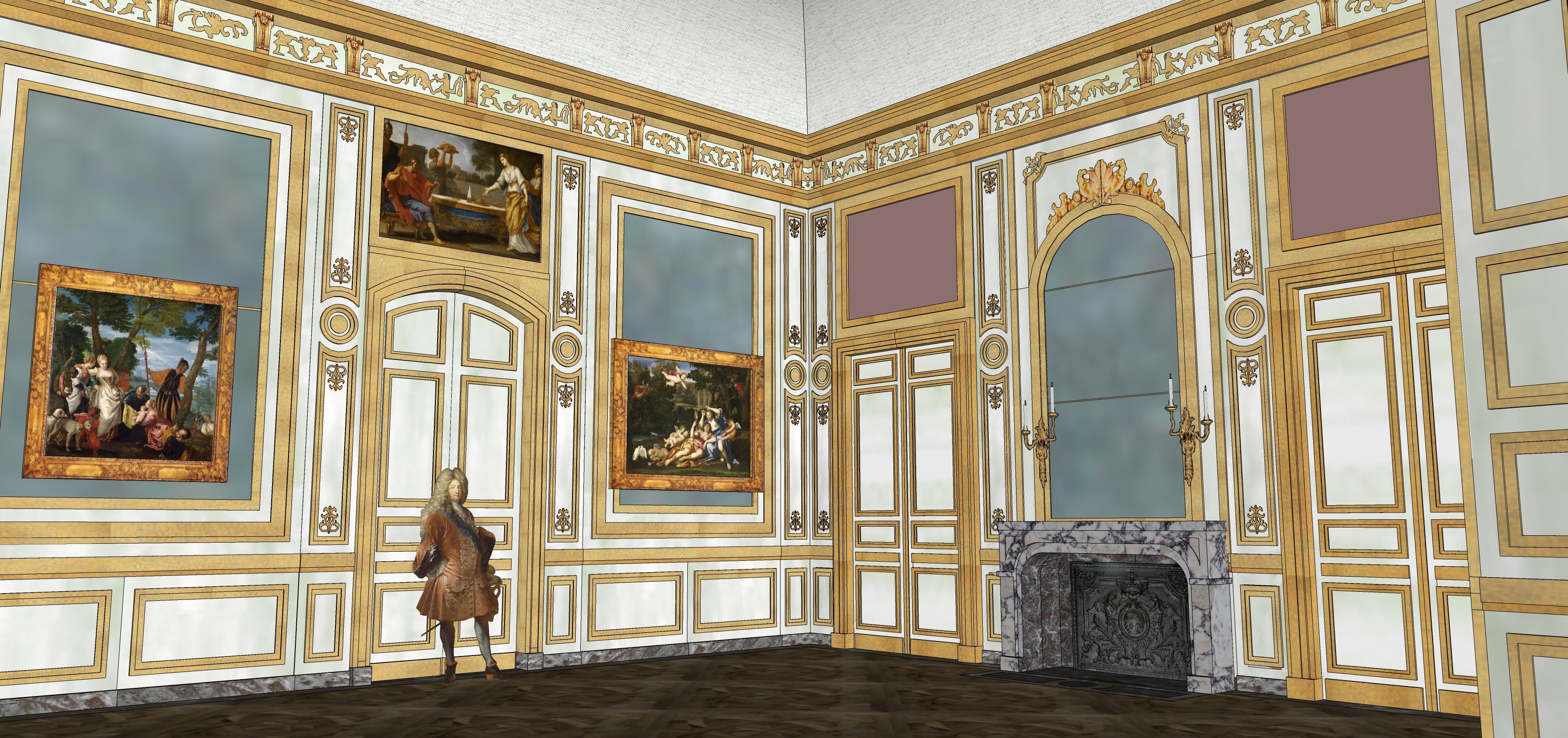
Essai de restitution du Grand Cabinet de l'aile des marronniers, with the canvases in place circa 1705

The Dauphin had some prestigious paintings in this room, including Renaud and Armide by the Dominiquin, and Moses saved from the waters by Nicolas Poussin. These canvases come from the royal collections.

==== Grand Salon ====
It was the main room of the apartment of the chestnut trees, with an area of 100 m². The dauphin placed there other pictures from the royal collections, including two by Paul Veronese.

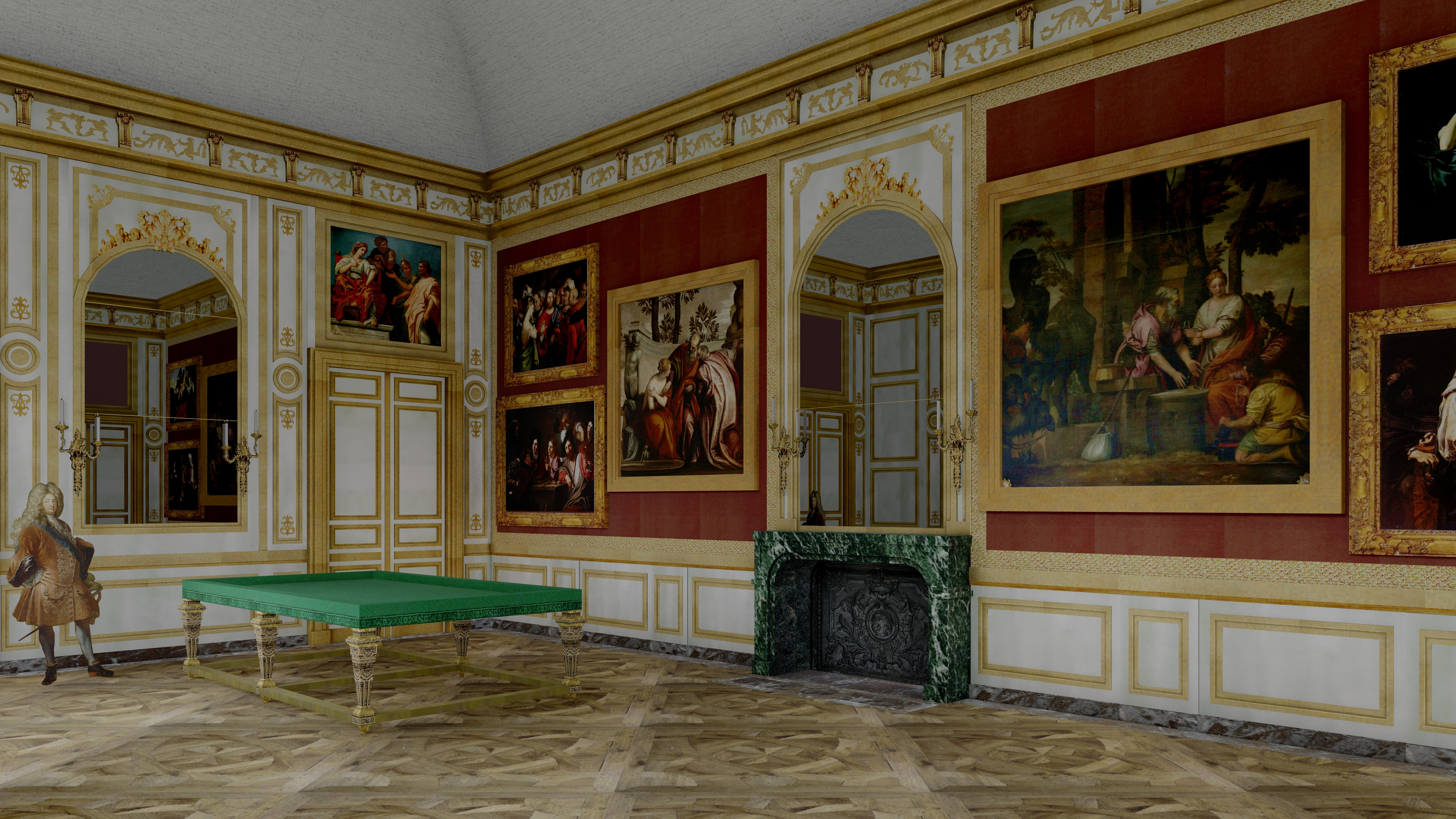
Grand salon, c. 1705. With paintings placed by Monseigneur

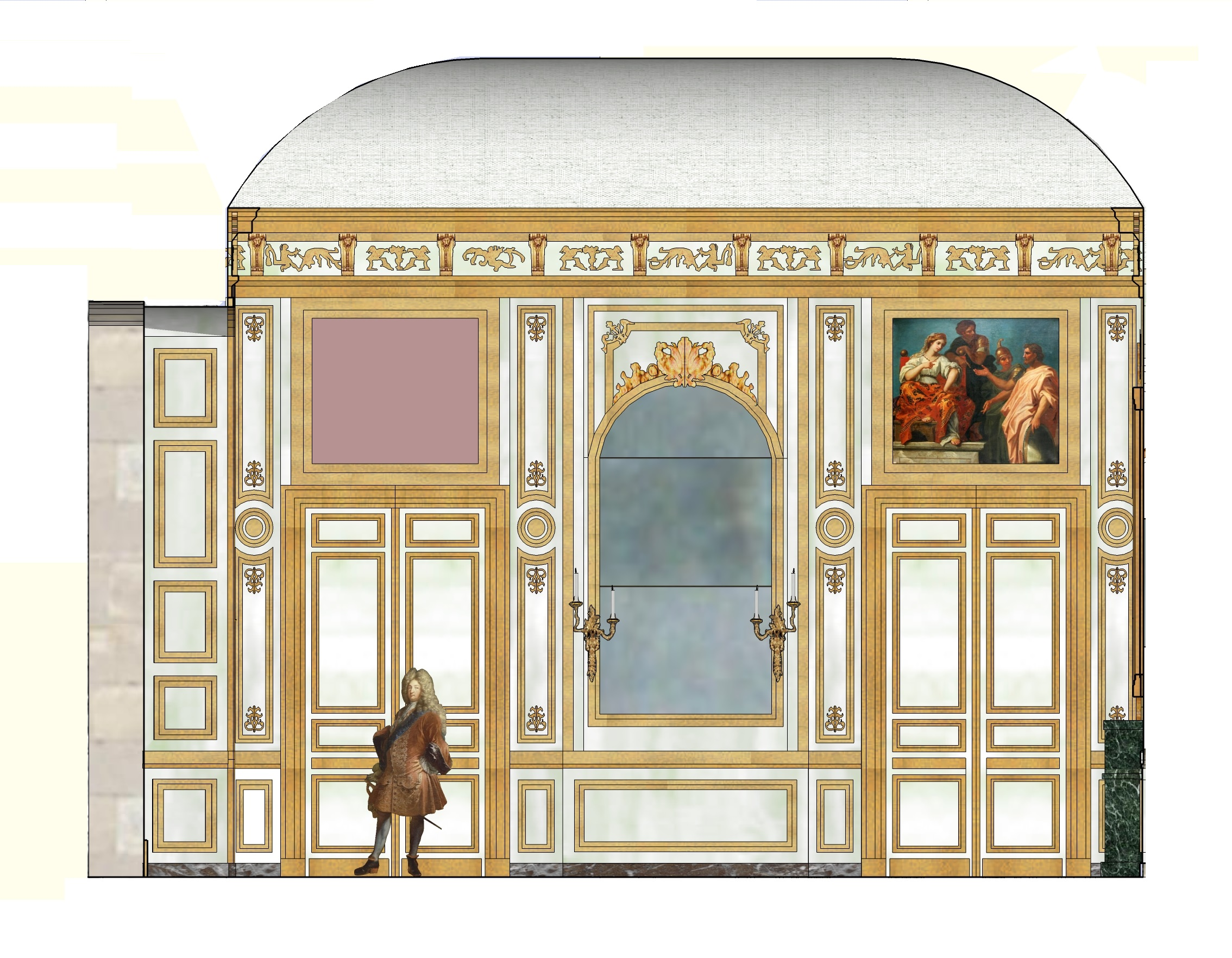
Essai de restitution de la coupe de la paroi Est du grand salon des marronniers, circa 1705

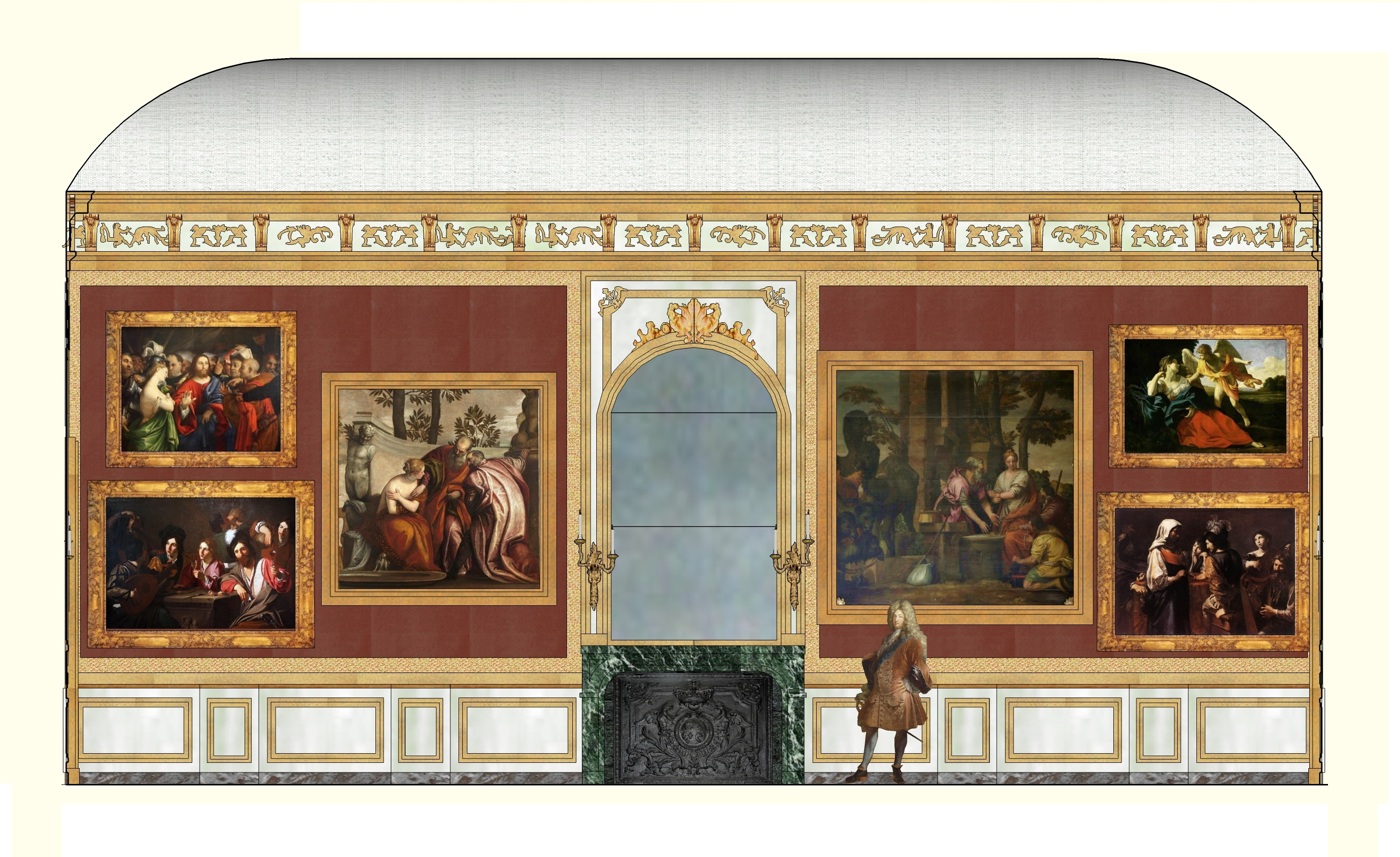
Essai de restitution de la coupe de la paroi Sud du grand salon des marronniers, around 1705. With paintings placed by Monseigneur the dauphin.

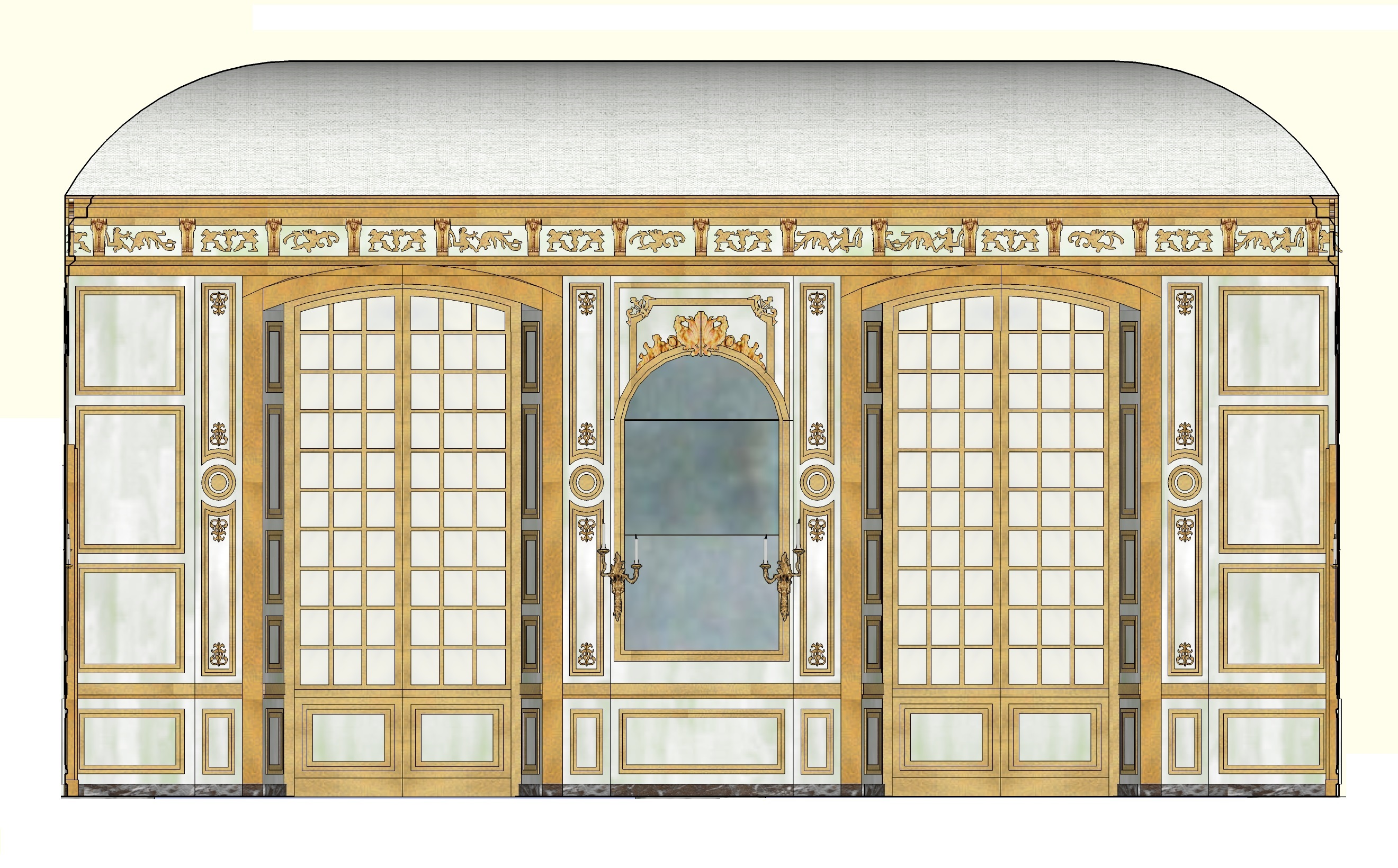
Essai de restitution de la coupe de la paroi Ouest du grand salon des marronniers, circa 1705
Canvases by Nicolas Loir from the queen's apartment in Versailles, repurposed in the Grand Salon.

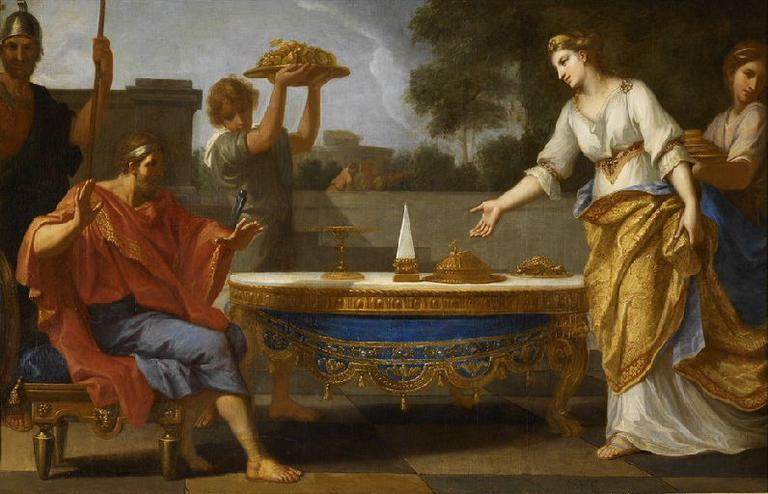
Pithopolis faisant servir des mets en or au roi Pithès (Pithopolis having King Pithès served food of gold), Nicolas Loir, formerly "Cléopâtre qui, dans un festin....", musée de Brou.

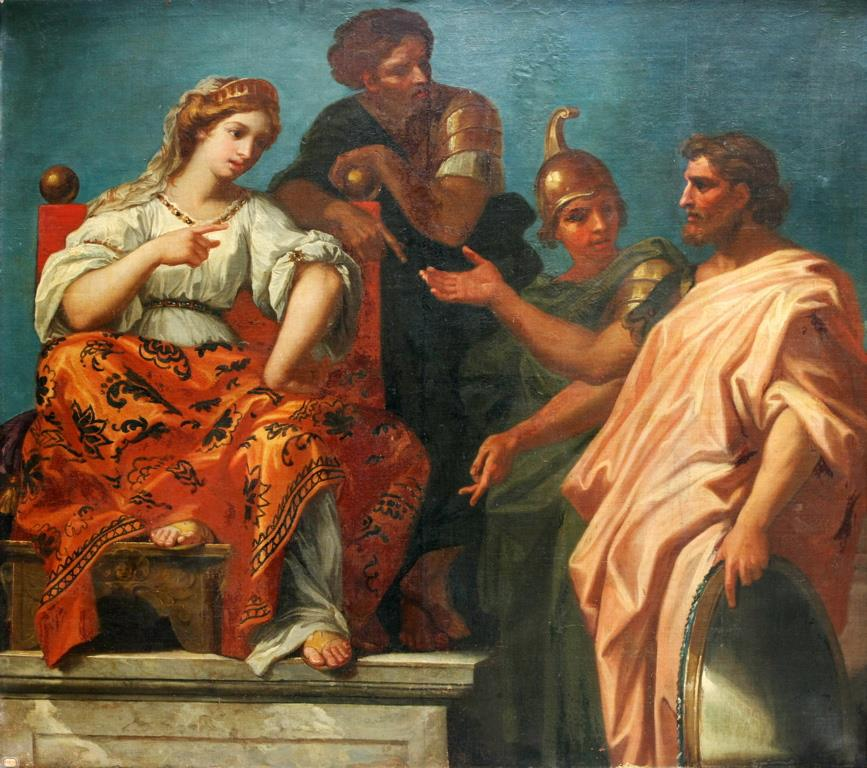
Reine donnant audience à un vieillard (Queen Giving Audience to an Old Man), by Nicolas Loir, also known as La reine de Saba (The Queen of Saba), Musée Hyacinthe-Rigaud, Perpignan

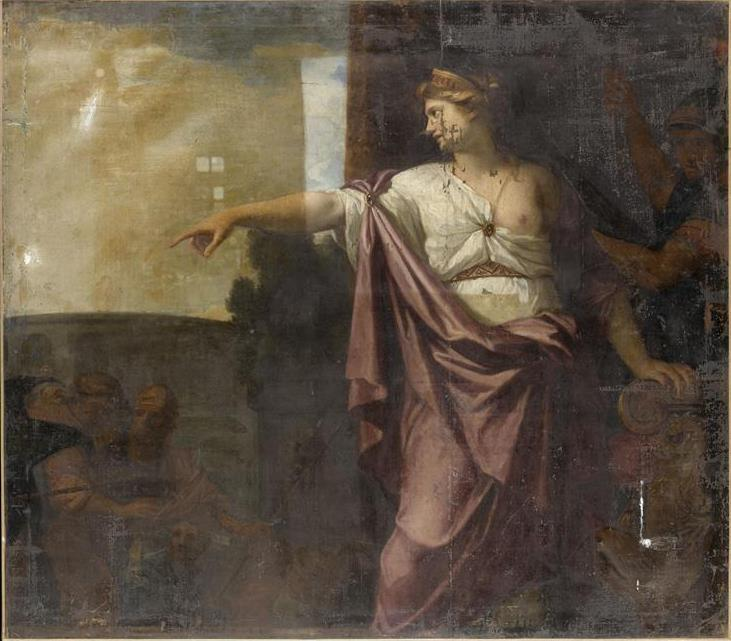
Reine s'adressant à des soldats (Dueen addressing soldiers), or "la reine de Saba appuyée sur son trône" (the Queen of Saba leaning on her throne), Nicolas Loir, musée du Louvre, n°8715

==== The dining room ====
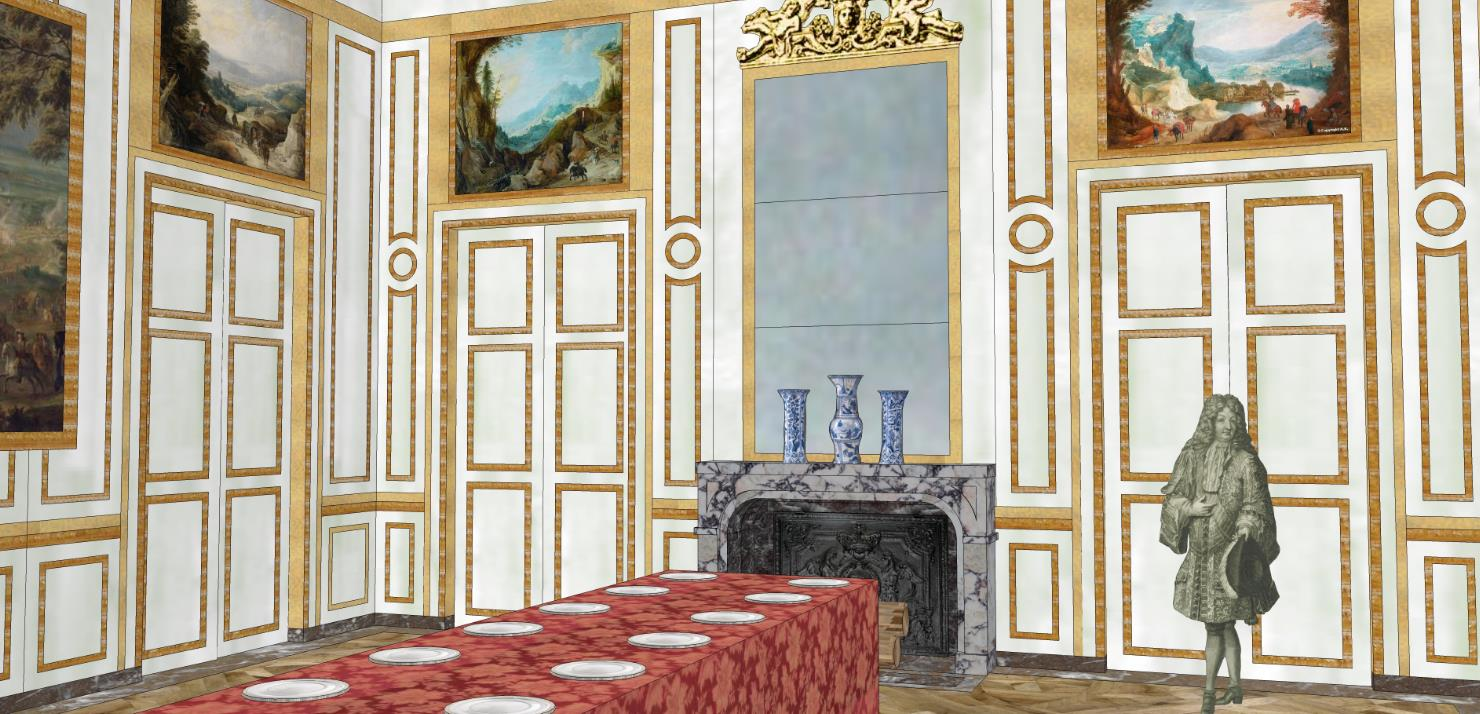
Essai de restitution de la salle à manger de l'aile des marronniers du château de Meudon. Table dressée en 1704 pour recevoir le duc de Bavière, beau-frère du Dauphin.

It was in this hall that the Bishop invited guests to dine.

==== The cabinet of the buffet ====
This small room had two small basins, from which flowed streams of water.

==== "Small Fresh Apartment" ====
Behind these large reception rooms, the Prince was given a "small fresh apartment", which consisted of an antechamber and another room. As well as a cabinet, it was enlivened by miniatures painted by Jean Cotelle the Elder, representing the gardens of Versailles. These three rooms were all wooded at the Capucine, and adorned with the door-tops by Jean-Baptiste Belin.

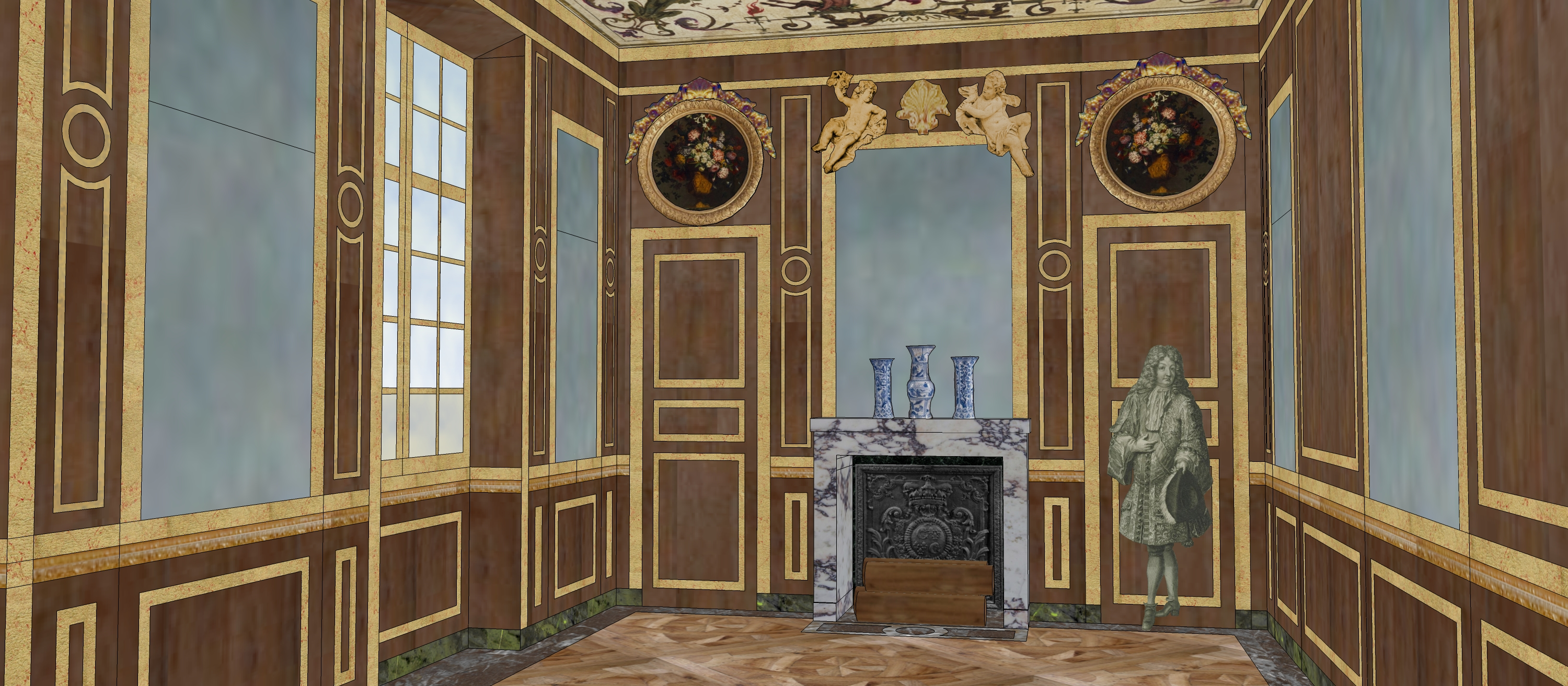
Chamber of Monseigneur in the Petit Appartement Frais de l'aile des marronniers, c. 1703

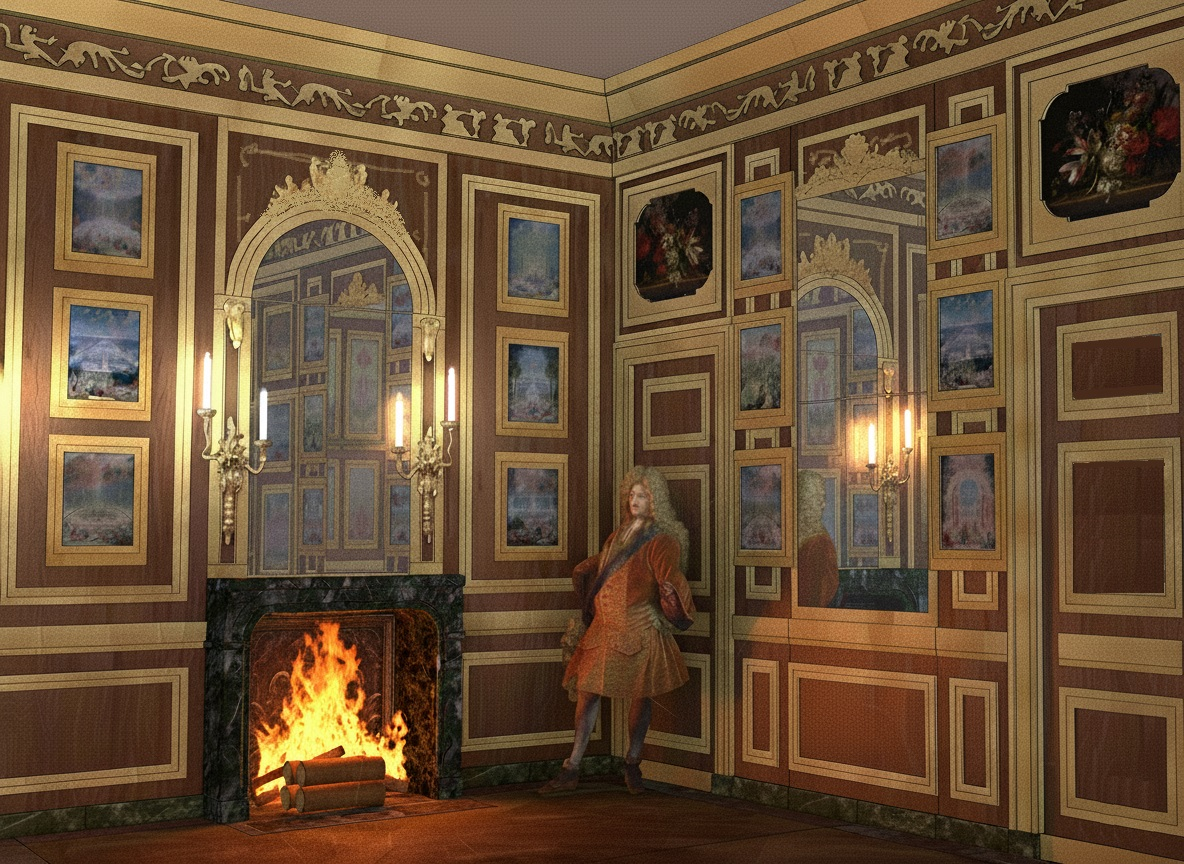
Cabinet of the "Petit appartement frais", circa 1703–1711

Miniatures of the gardens of Versailles, gouache by Jean II Cotelle

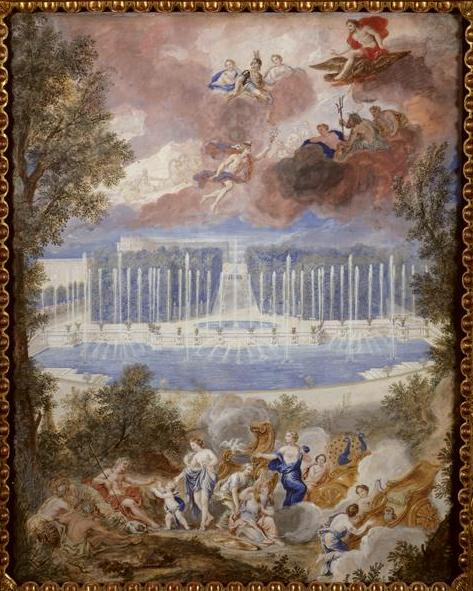
Le bassin de Neptune (Neptune's Basin), Jean II Cotelle

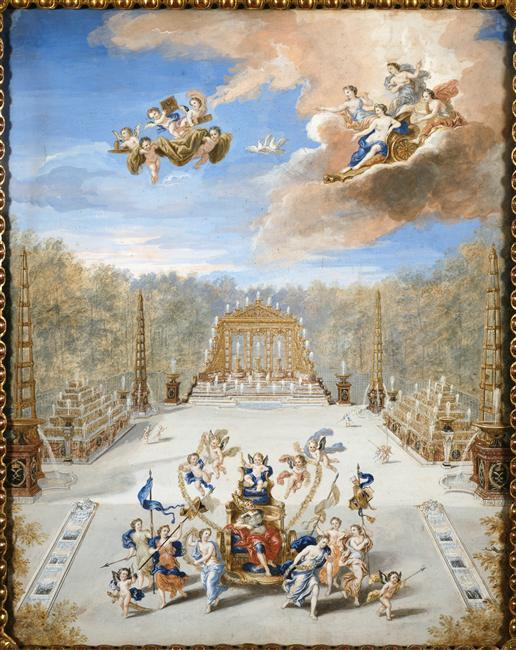
L'arc de triomphe, Jean II Cotelle

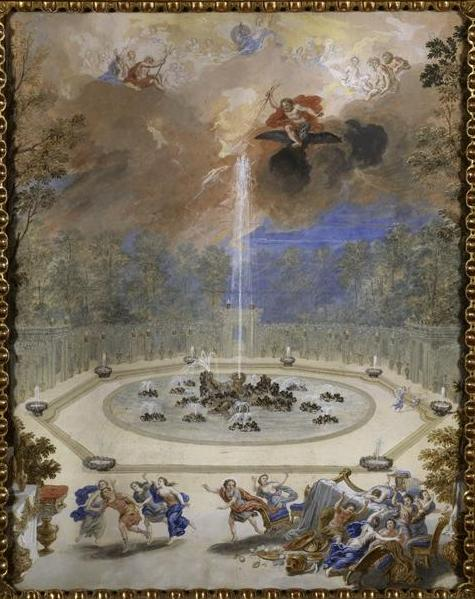
L'Encelade, Jean II Cotelle

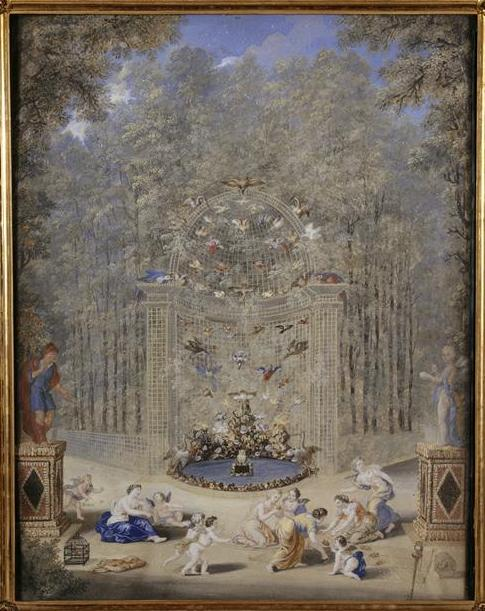
L'entrée du labyrinthe (The Entrance of the Labyrinth), Jean II Cotelle

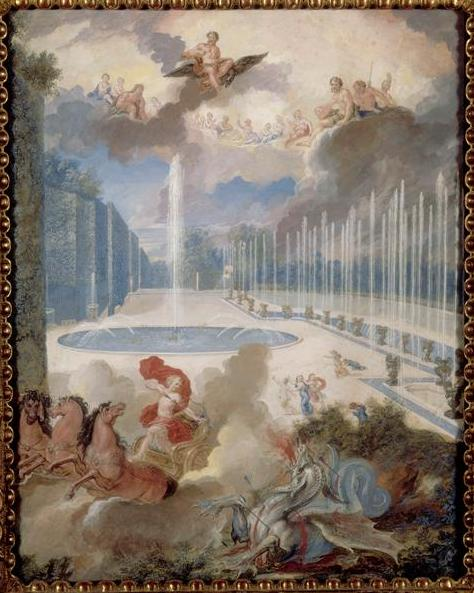
La fontaine du dragon (The Fountain of the Dragon), Jean II Cotelle

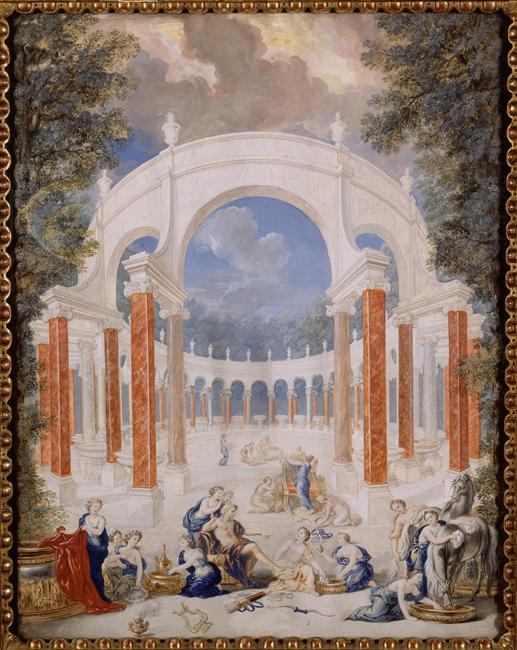
La colonnade, Jean II Cotelle

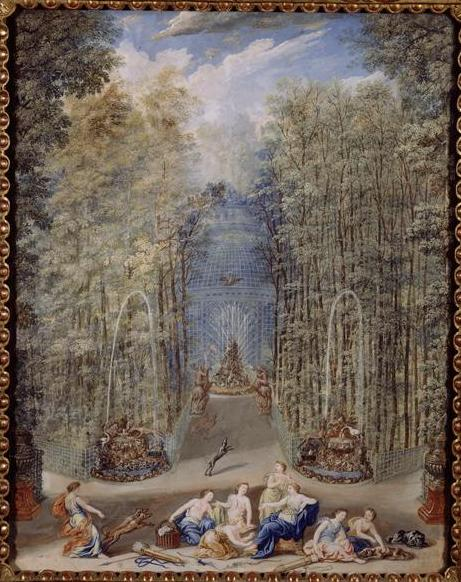
L'intérieur du labyrinthe (The Interior of the Labyrinth), Jean II Cotelle

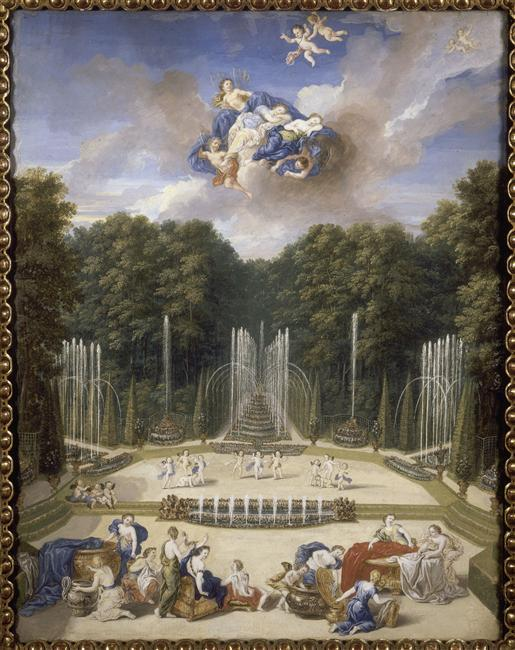
Le théâtre d'eau (The Water Theatre), Jean II Cotelle

=== Grotto of Meudon ===
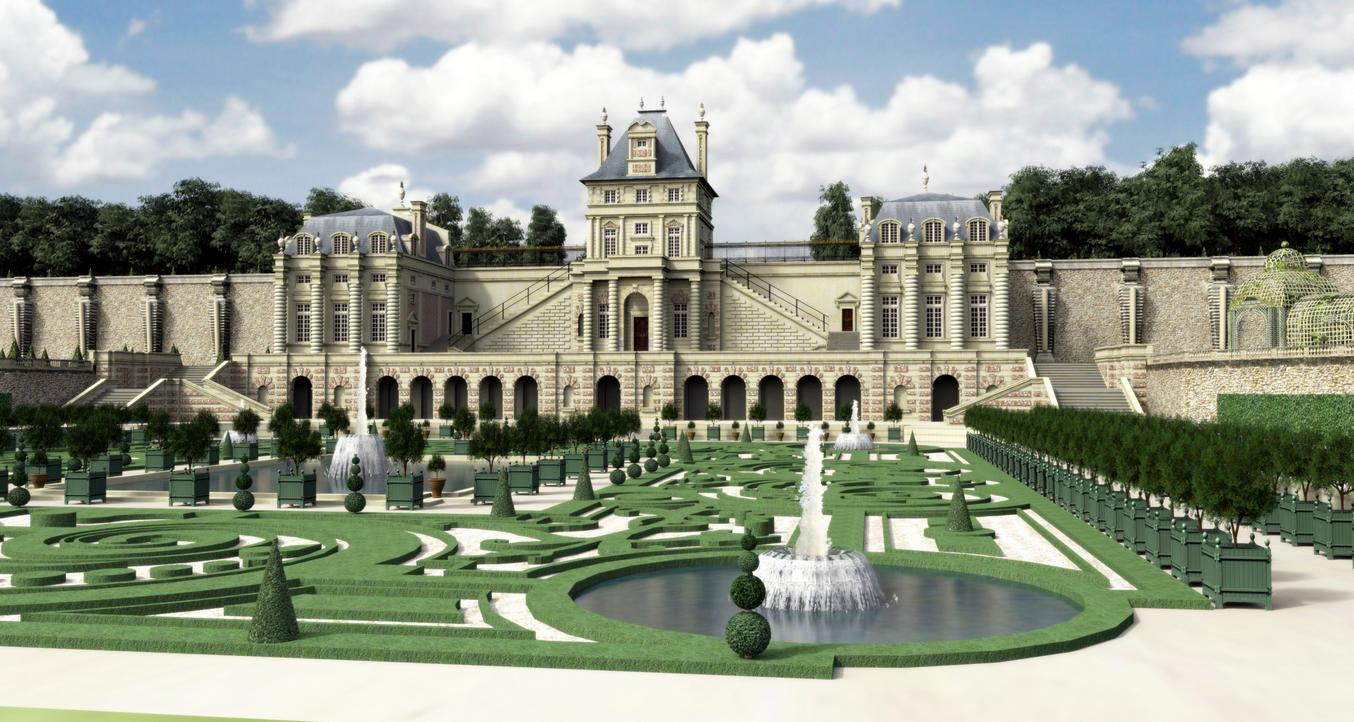
3D rendition of the Grotto of Meudon, c. 1690–1700. Franck Devedjian and Hervé Grégoire, 2013

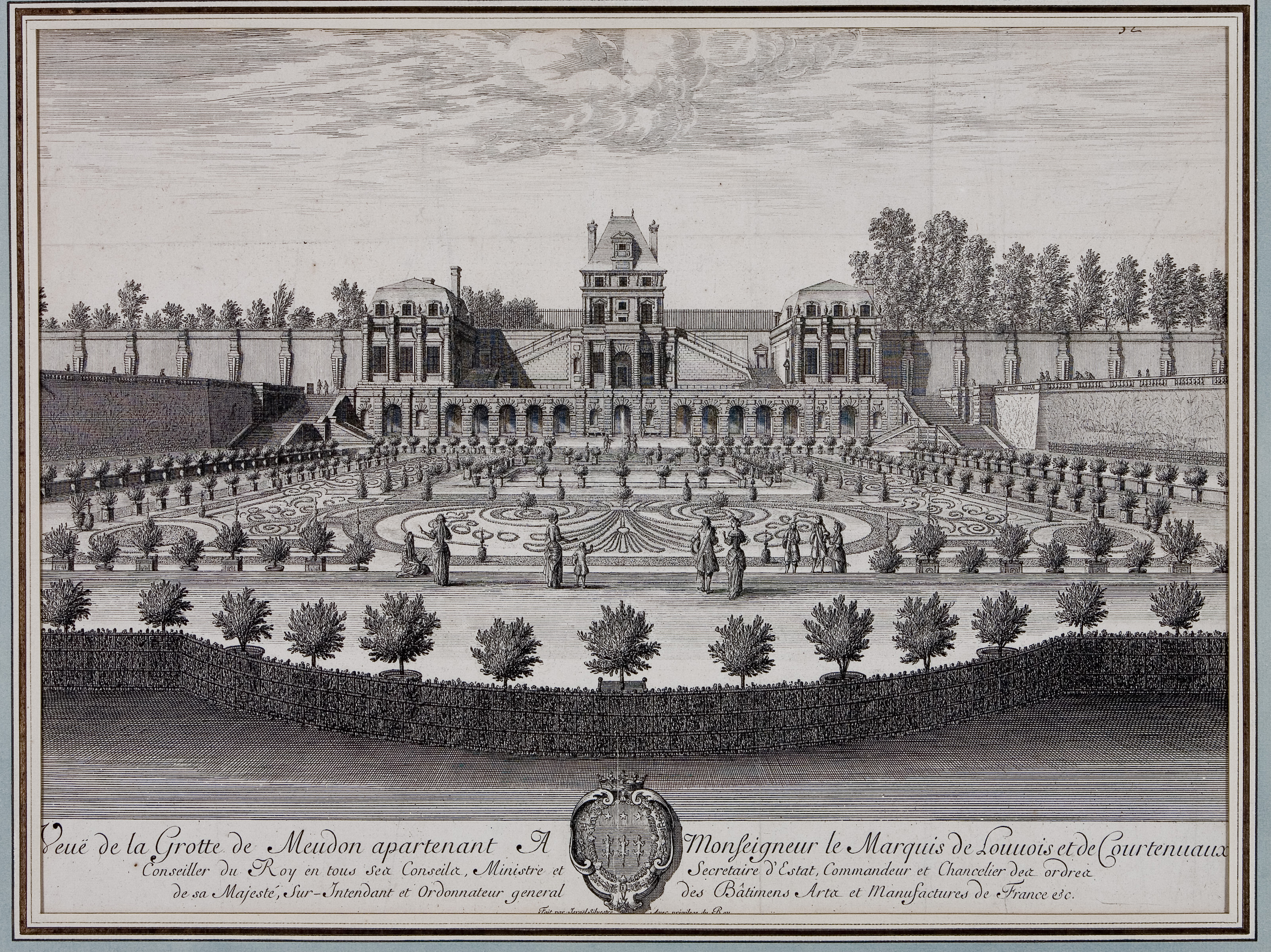
Grotte and parterre, Israël Silvestre, c. 1685.

The cave of Meudon is the twin sister of this "House of the Theater" begun for Henry II in 1556 by Philibert de l'Orme and continued in 1559 by Francesco Primaticcio, a beautiful belvedere which, following additions towards the end of century, became the Château-Neuf de Saint-Germain-en-Laye.

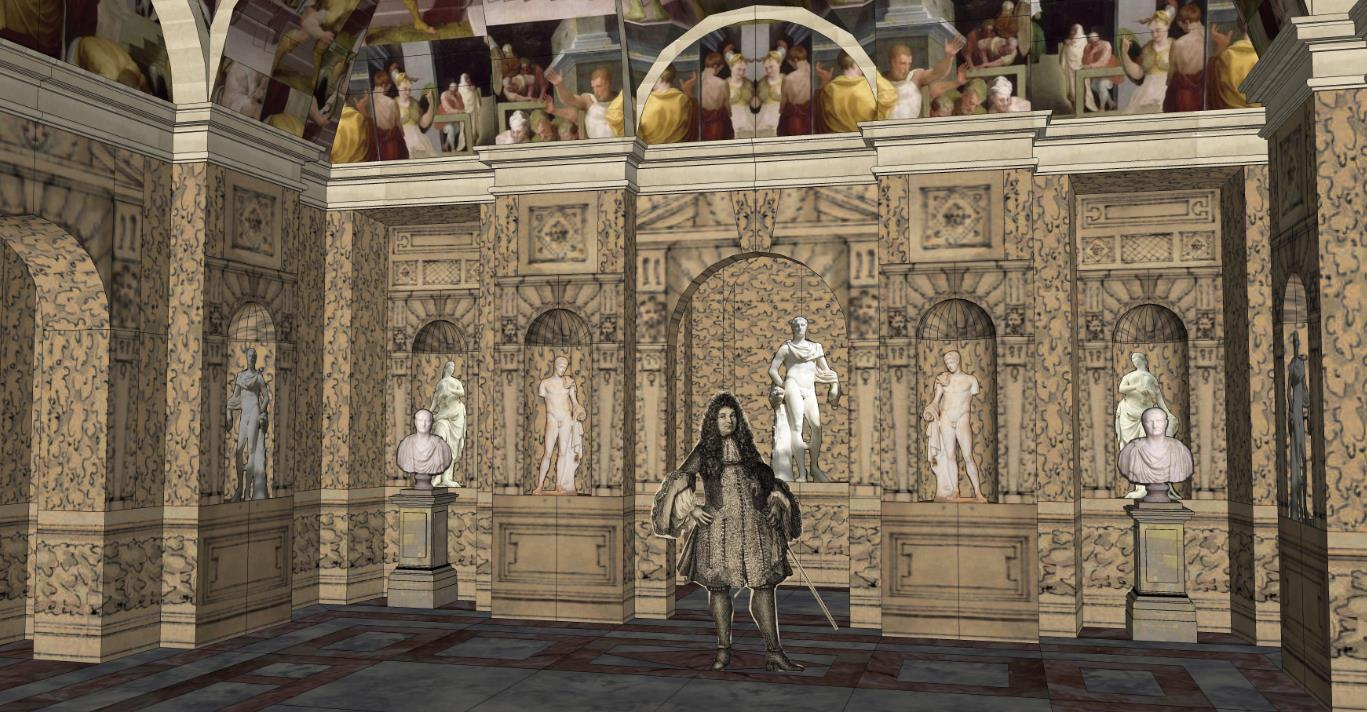
Interior of the Grotto

"The Primatice painted for the Cardinal of Lorraine for his Chateau de Meudon a cave made up of several rooms, among others that of the pavilion where there were a number of frescoed figures in the ceiling; We destroyed this cave by building the new Castle in the time of Monseigneur the Dauphin ayeul du Roy. "

Giorgio Vasari speaks of the Grotto when he approaches Primaticius, who is its architect and, as it were, the chief decorator. There is also an interesting description of a traveler from the mid-17th century, preserved in the manuscripts of the Saint-Germain fonds, no. 944, as given by the "Lettres écrites de la Vendée":

"At two leagues from Paris is Meudon, where is seen in the wood an admirable and wonderful grotto, enriched with supports and damping of cut stone, small turrets turned and massed in the ass of a lamp, paved with a pavement Of porphire bastard, speckled with white, red, green, gray spots and of a hundred different colors, noughed by esgouts made with gargoyles and lyon muffles. There are columns, figures and statues of marble, grotesque paintings, compartimens and images of gold and azure, and other couleurs. The frontispiece has large fluted and roughened columns, trimmed with bases, Capital, architrave, friezes, cornices and moldings of good grace And just proportion: the vase and taillour sustained on the tests of virtues, approaching the average proportion of the colossi, enriched with leaves of acanthus and ursine branch to sustain the fullness of the stock, Very well conducted and completed; But the troubles have made there irreparable ruins, and especially to the pipes which have been broken".

It was demolished in 1705 to build the Château-Neuf in the same location.

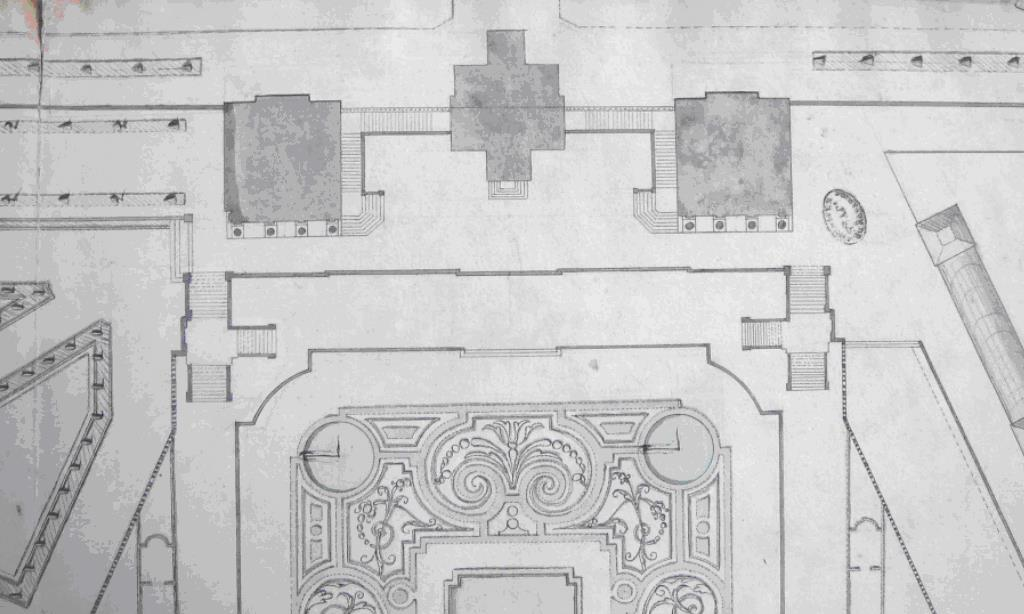
Map of the Grotto de Meudon and its surroundings, late 17th century, Archives nationales

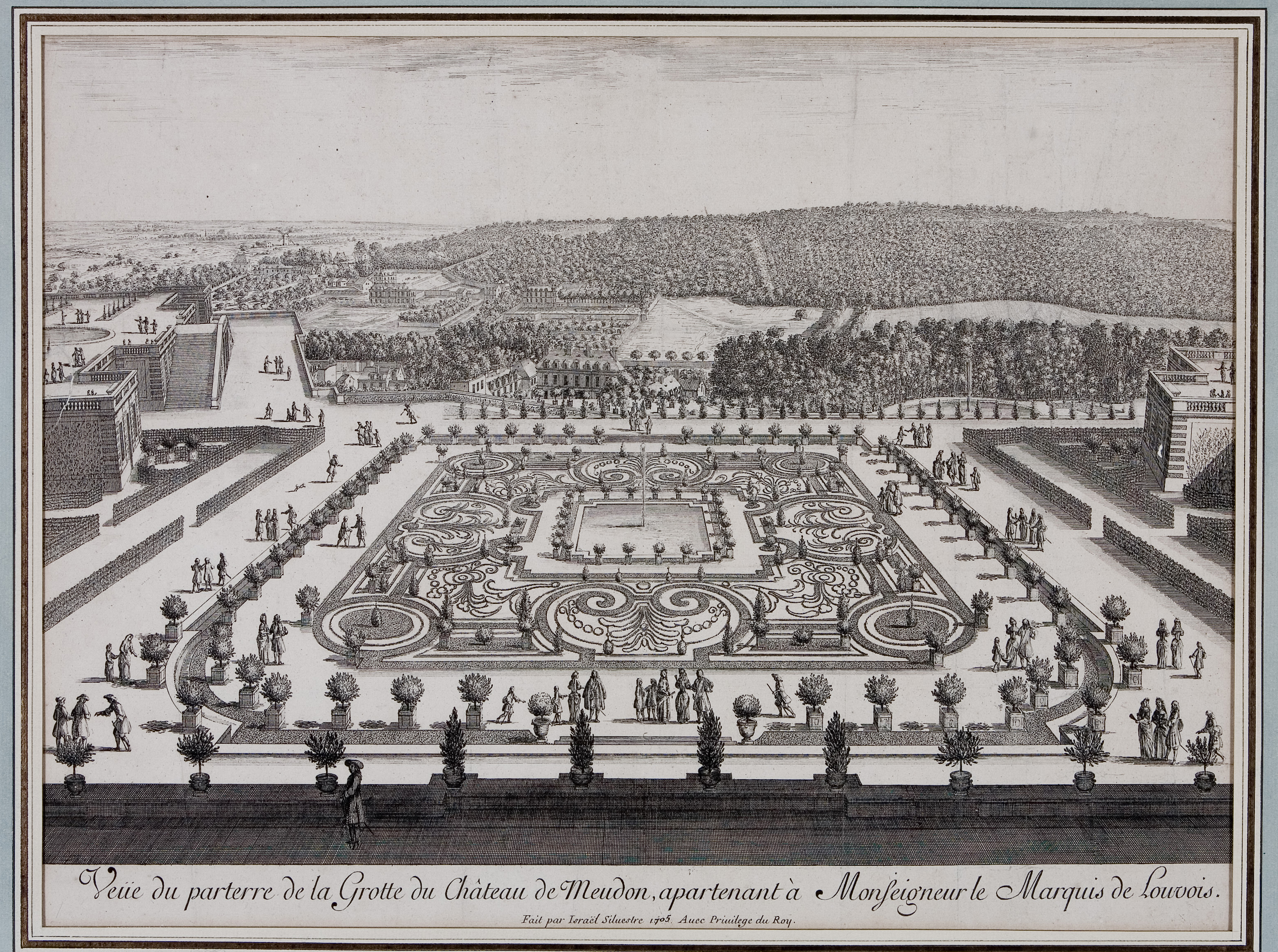
Parterre of the Grotto, seen from the central salon. Israël Silvestre, c. 1685

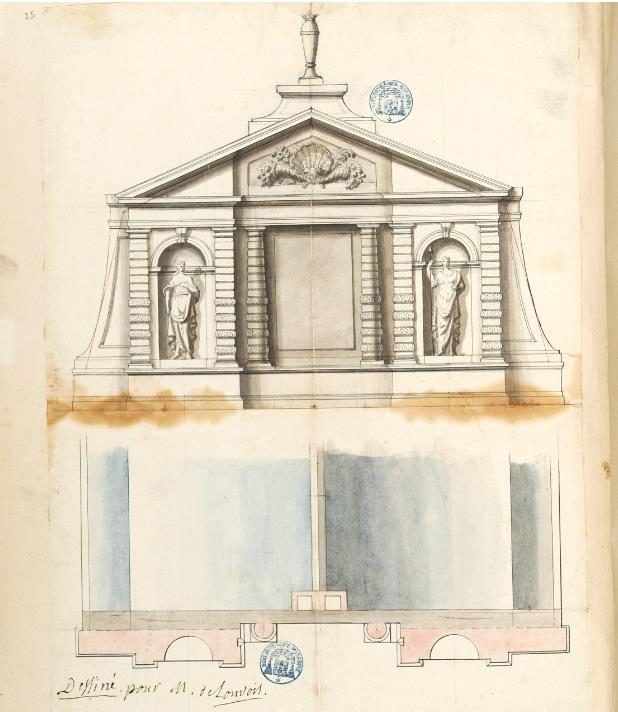
Décor project for the Grotto, c. 1685. Not carried out. Jules Hardouin-Mansart

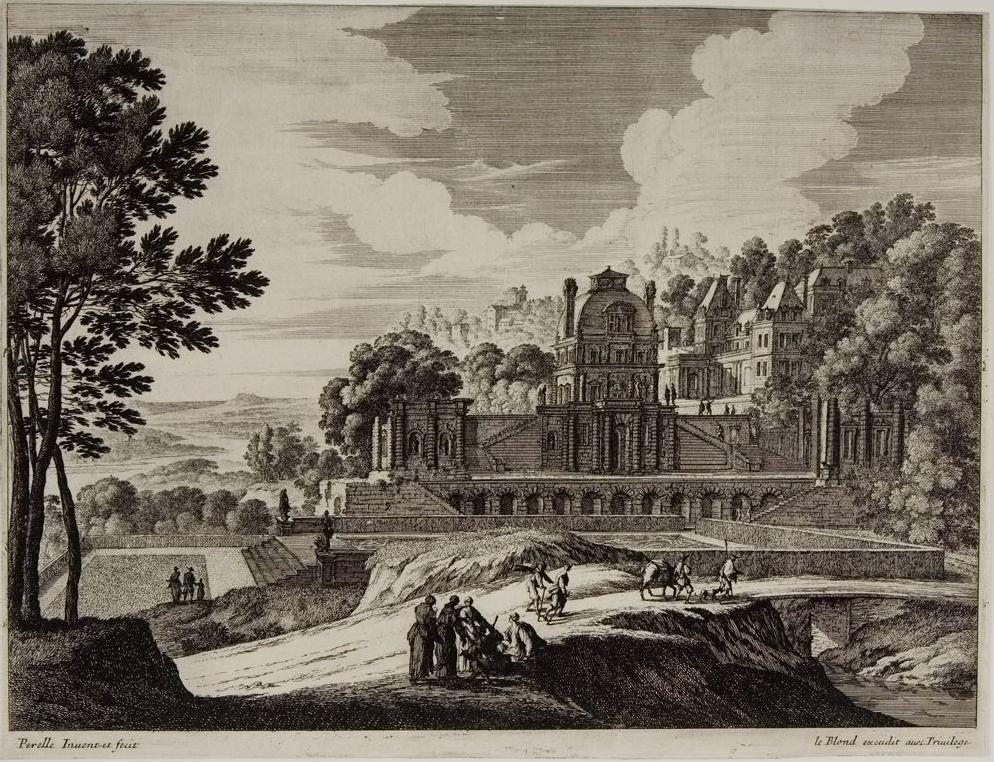
Grotto of Meudon in an imaginairy landscape, Harvard Art Museum, 34.1991 (The roofing of the central pavilion is fictive)

=== Château-Neuf (new castle) ===
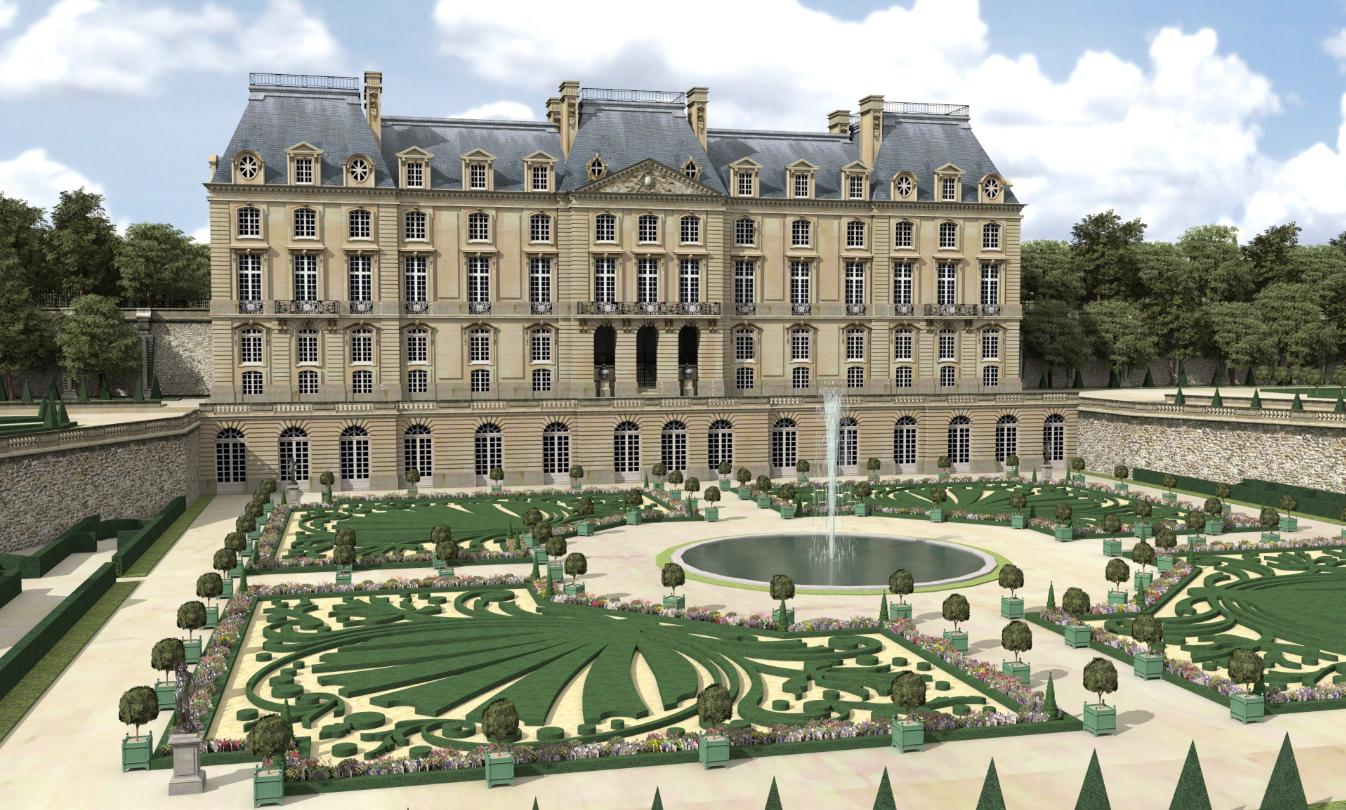
3D rendition of the Château-Neuf at its apogee, around 1709. Franck Devedjian and Hervé Grégoire, 2013

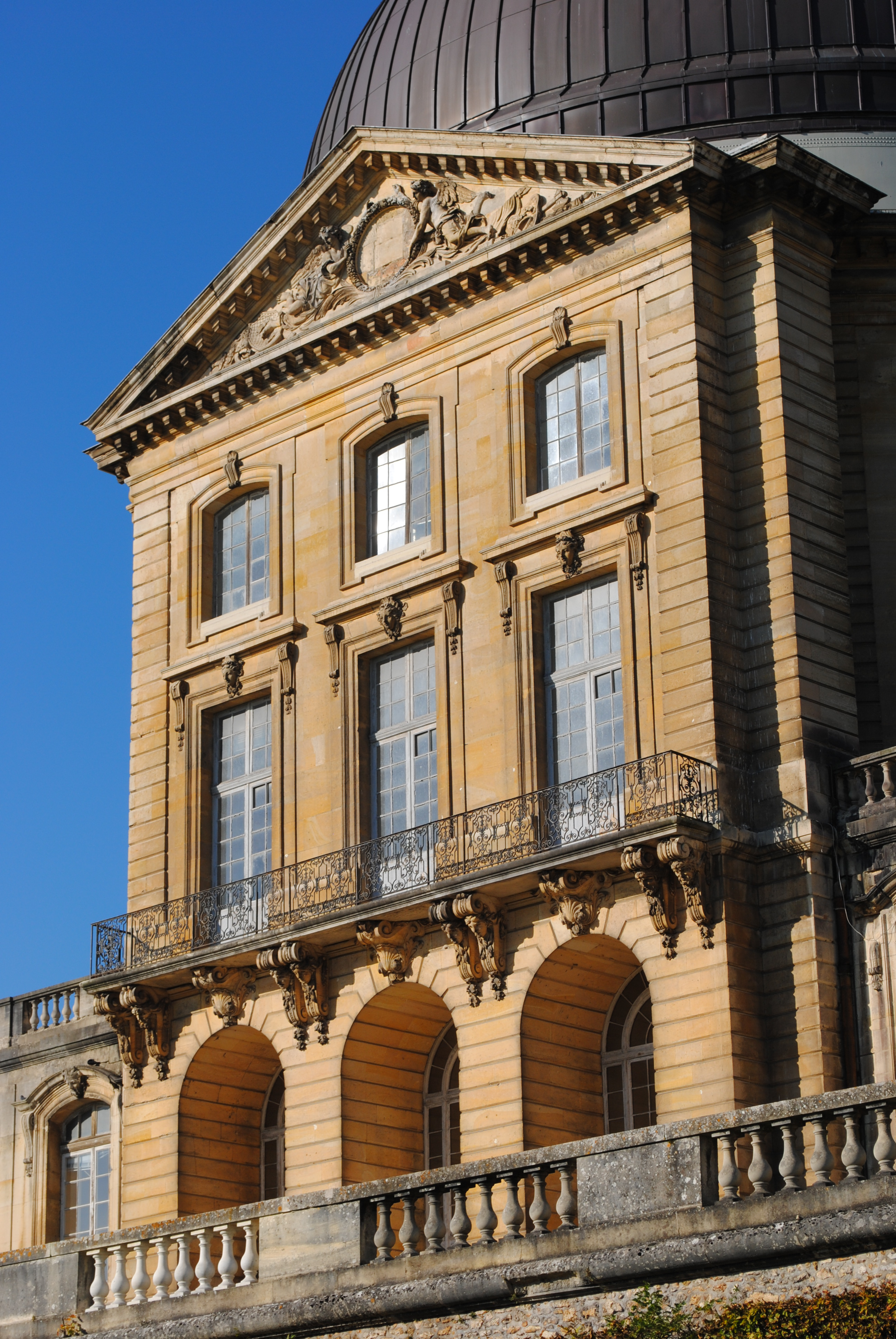
Facade of the Château-Neuf, 2013

We owe the plans of the Château-Neuf to the architect Jules Hardouin-Mansart. Philippe de Courcillon de Dangeau wrote May 21, 1706, that being at Marly, "the king worked in the morning with Mansart, who showed him the plans of the buildings that M. M. wants to make at Meudon at the place where the grotto is." Monseigneur wished this building to house the courtiers he received at Meudon, and the king aimed at the drawings made for Monseigneur. The building was erected on the site of the grotto, previously demolished in 1705.

A long corridor serves all the apartments: this was not unusual for the time. What was much more so was the systematization of the typical dwelling of the courtier, since the whole of the Château-Neuf can be compared to a "hotel" in the modern sense of the word.

After nearly two hundred years, a fire ravaged the building on January 31, 1871. The ruins were left to the inclement weather, and probably also looted, until 1879 when a law enacted the choice of Meudon as an observatory. Restoration of the ruins was then begun by the architect Constant Moyaux, saving from destruction what remained of the castle, especially the two lower floors, less damaged by the fire.

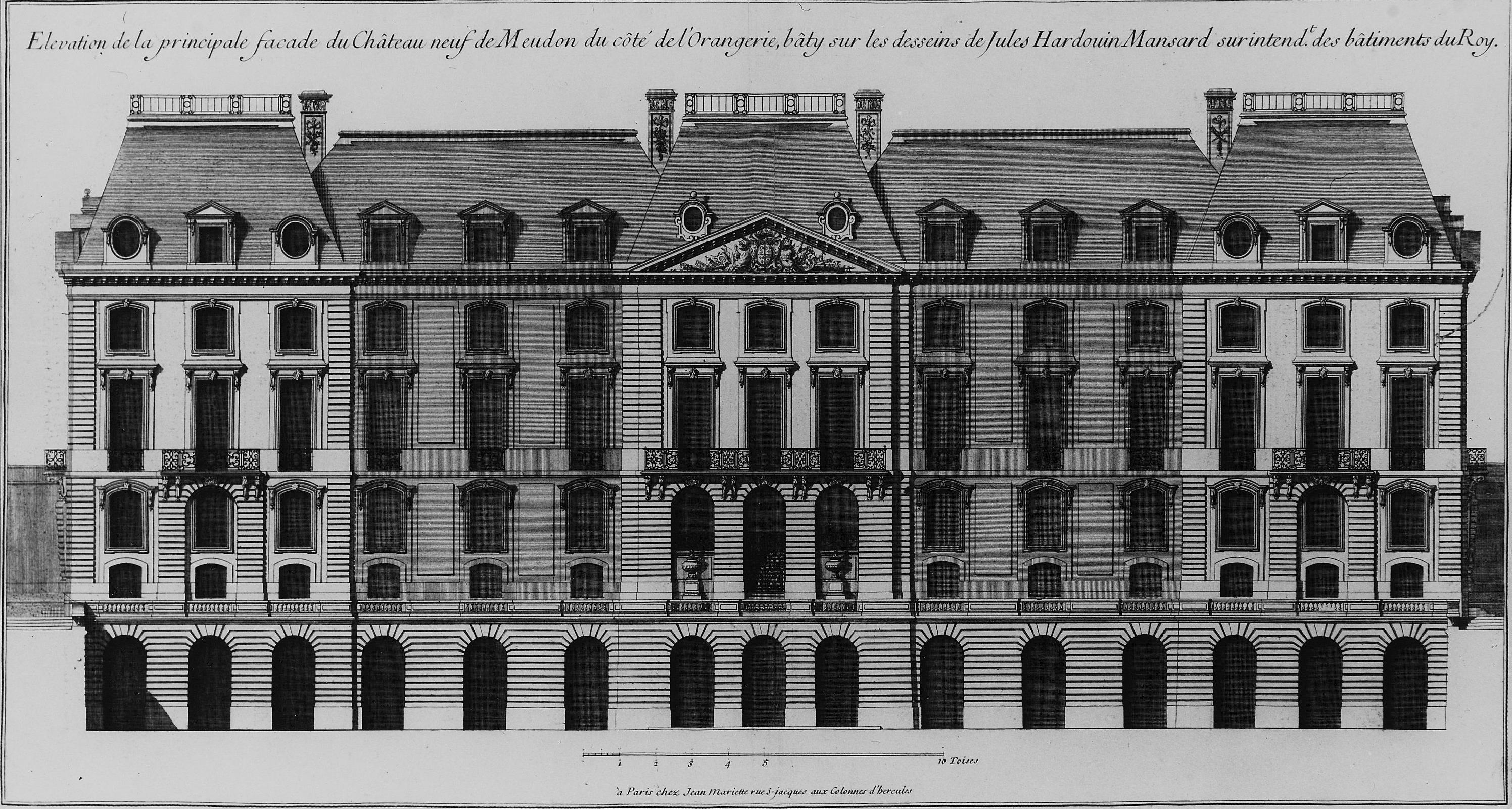
Château-Neuf from the parterre. Mariette, c. 1715

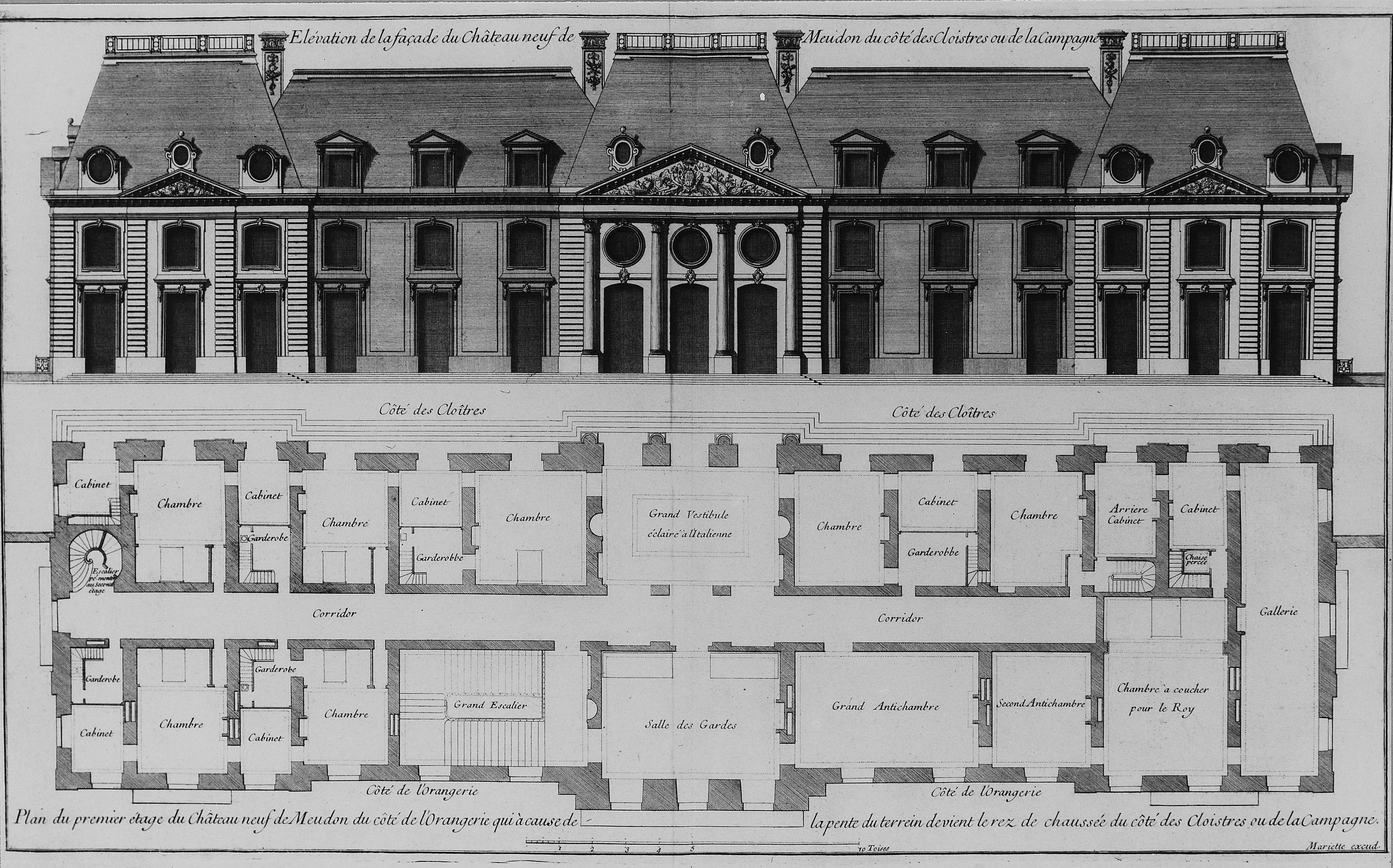
Third level of the Château-Neuf ("le bel étage"), by Mariette, around 1715

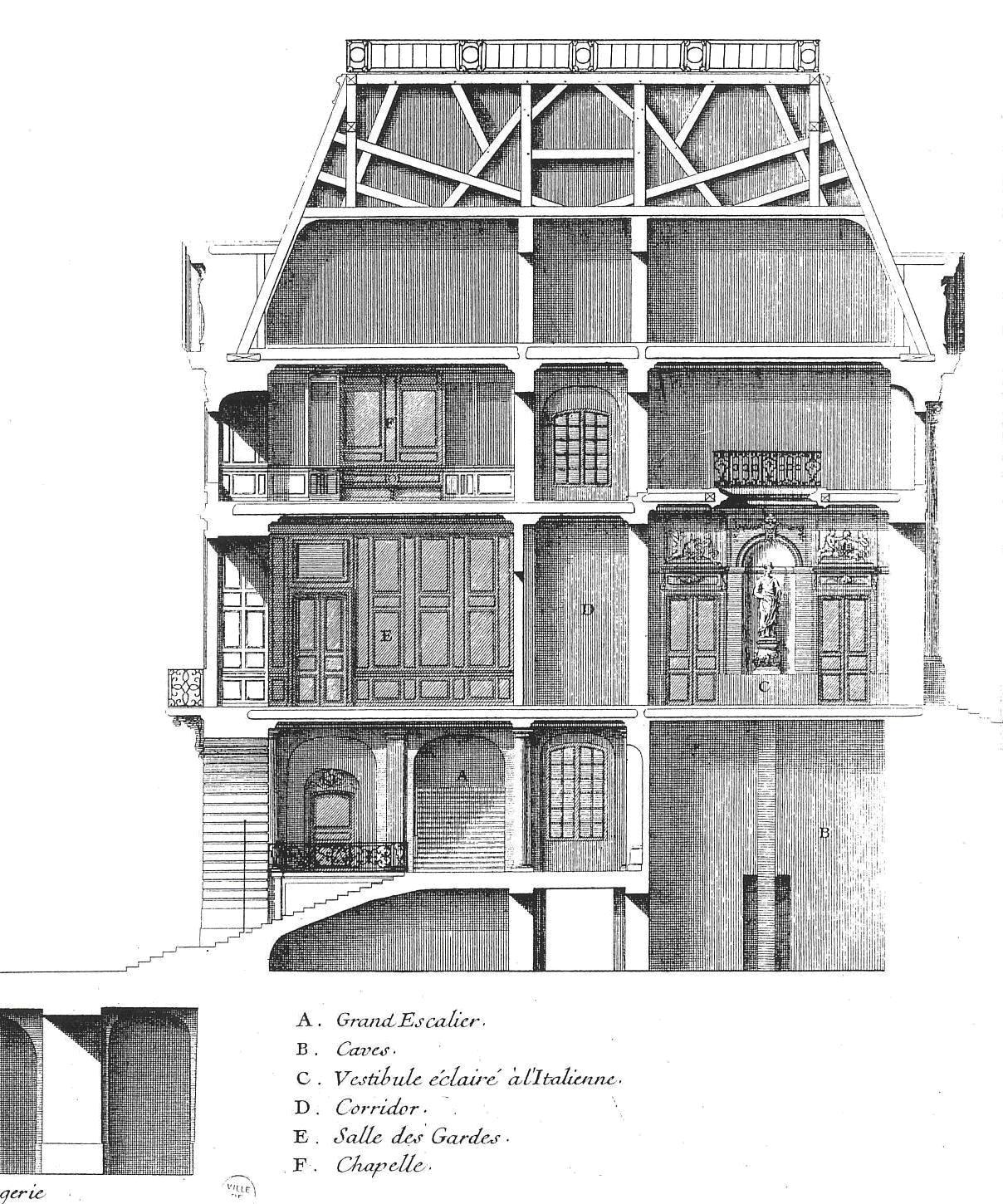
Cutaway of the Château-Neuf, circa 1720. Mariette

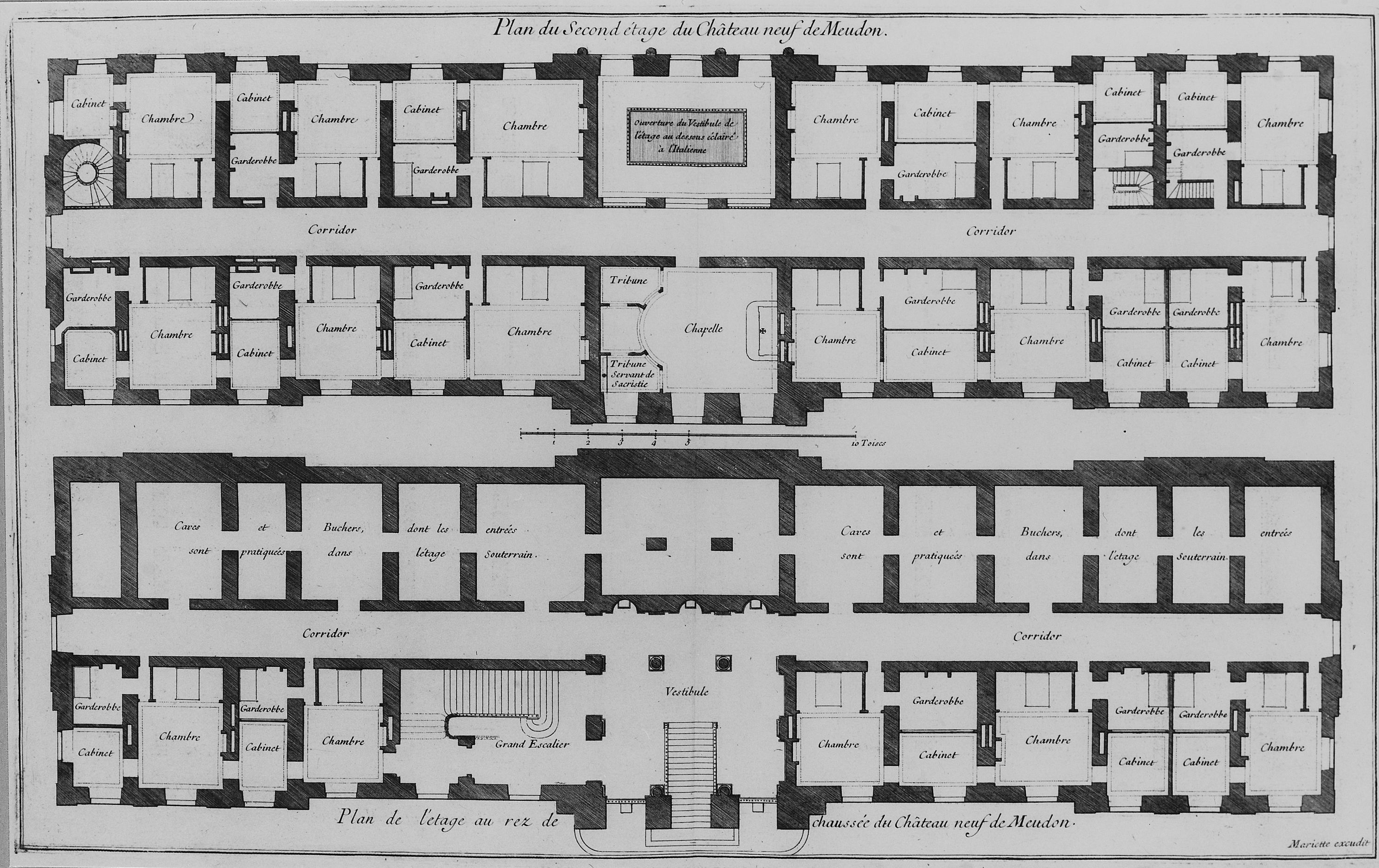
Levels 2 and 4 of the Château-Neuf. Mariette, c. 1715

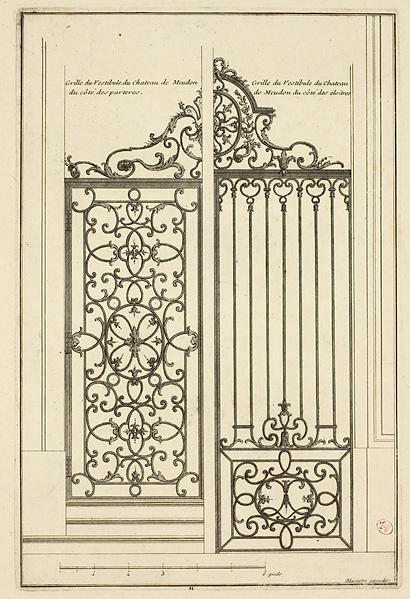
Grilles du Château-Neuf de Meudon. Mariette, A.F.

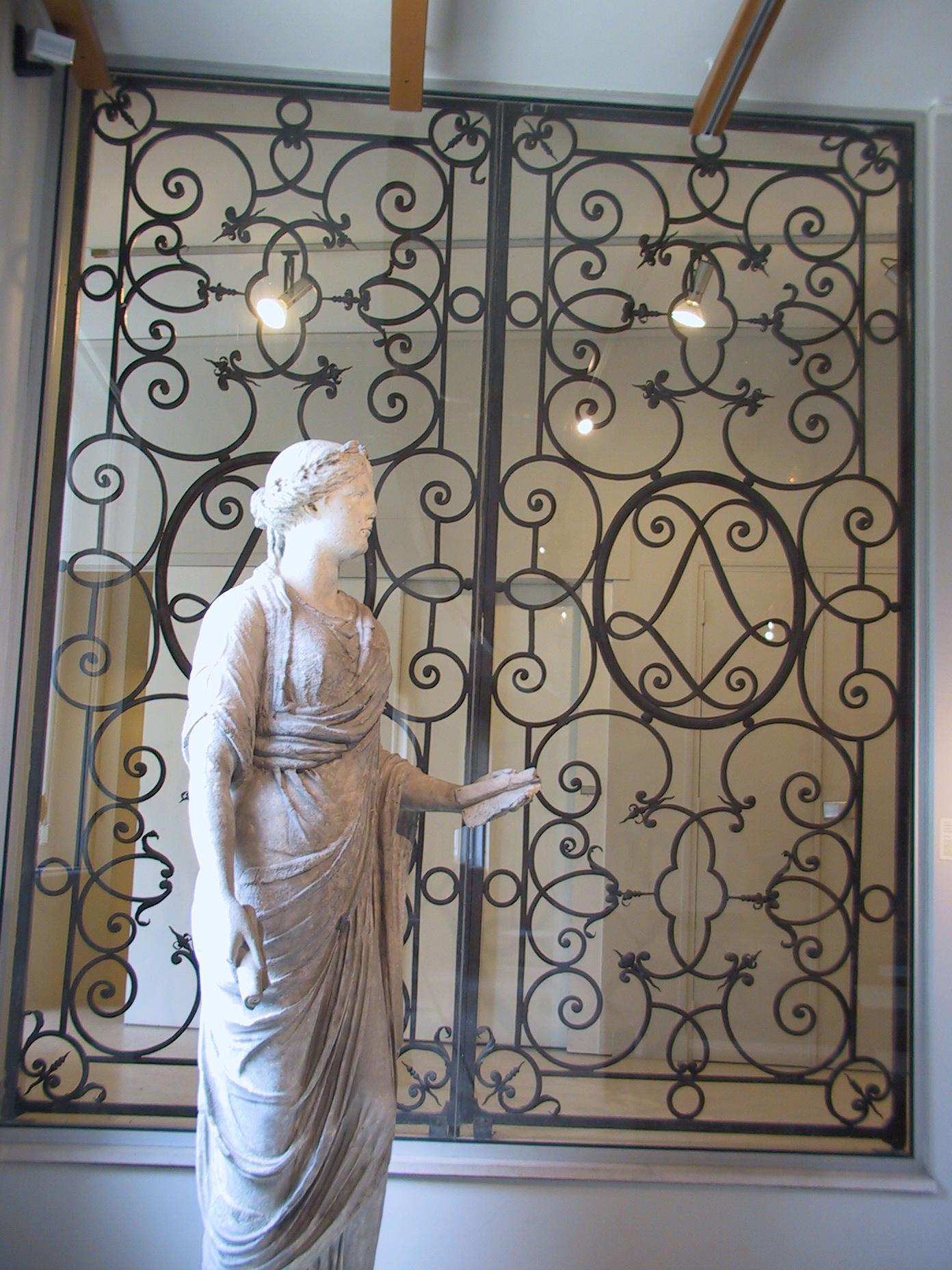
La grille basse du Château-Neuf, c. 1708 Musée-promenade de Marly-le-Roi.

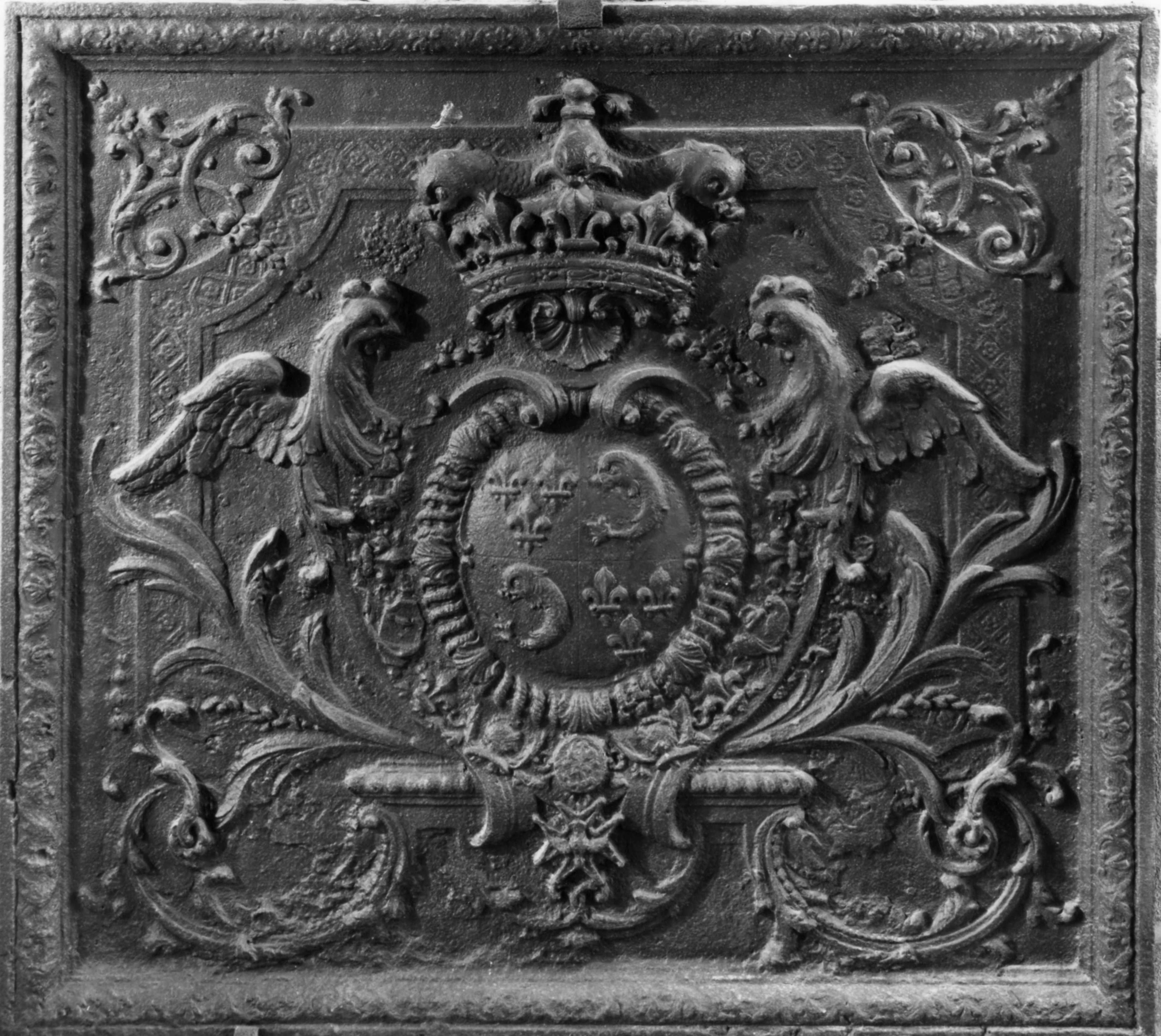
Taque foyère aux armes du dauphin, Château-Neuf, vers 1708. Musée d'art et d'histoire de Meudon

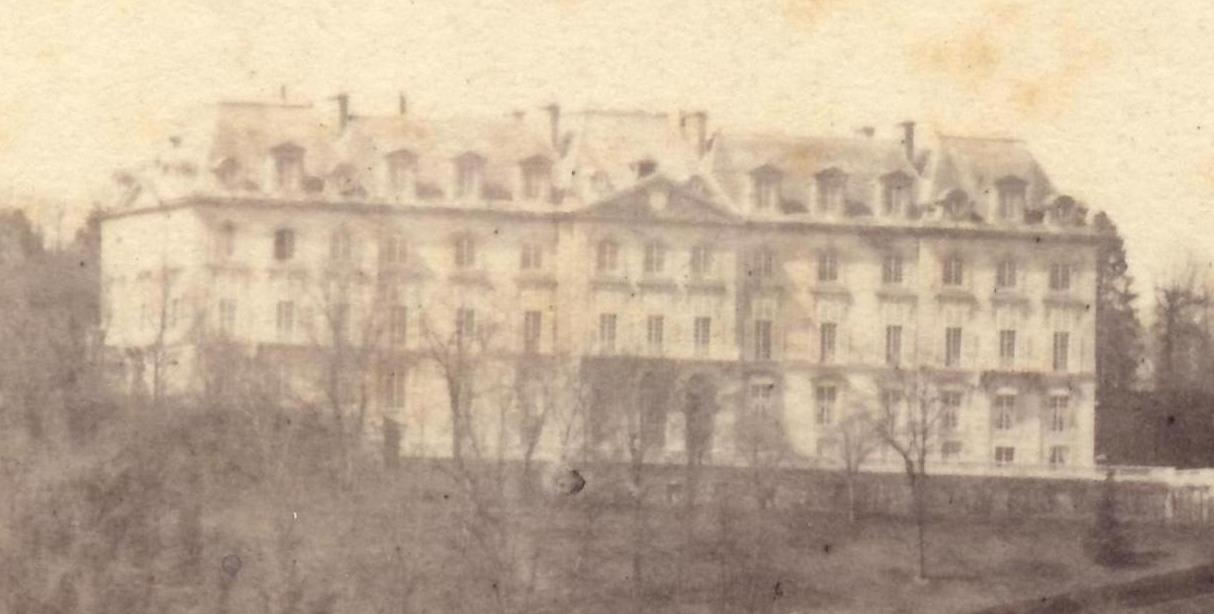
Photograph Château-Neuf, c 1860

==== The upper vestibule ====
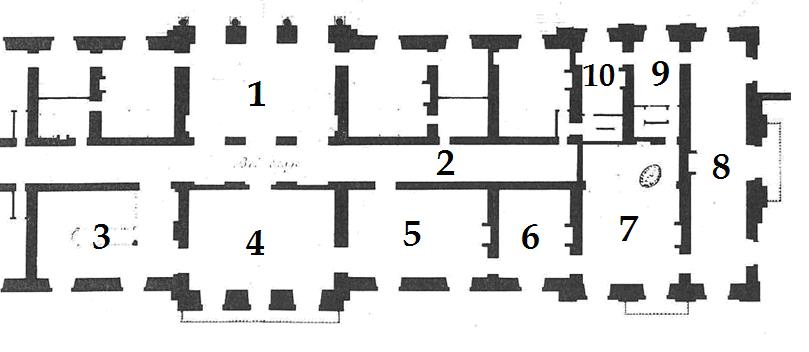
Layout of the Château-Neuf in 1709. Legend: 1. Upper vestibule 2.Corridor 3.Large staircase 4.Salle des Gardes (Guardroom) 5.First antechamber 6.Second antechamber 7.Monsignor's parade hall 8. Gallery 9.Cabinet 10.Arrangement -Notary.

The chateau was reached by the upper vestibule on the forest side. It was Italian, pierced by an opening, which made it possible to clear its space. The door-tops were carved with children representing the four seasons, the representation of which is preserved by photographs of plaster models, molded on the originals (Vente Sardou).

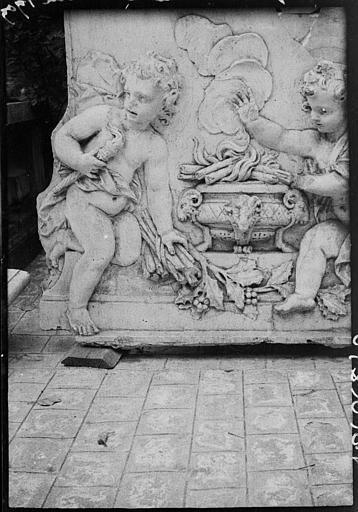
Winter, upper vestibule, 1708

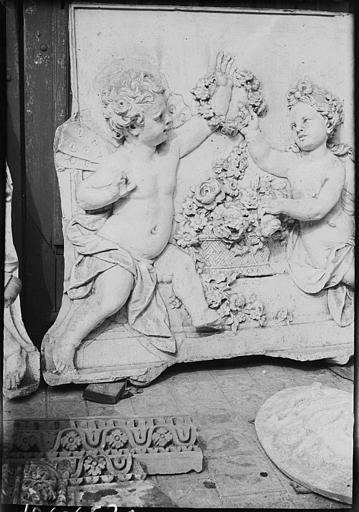
Spring, upper vestibule, 1708

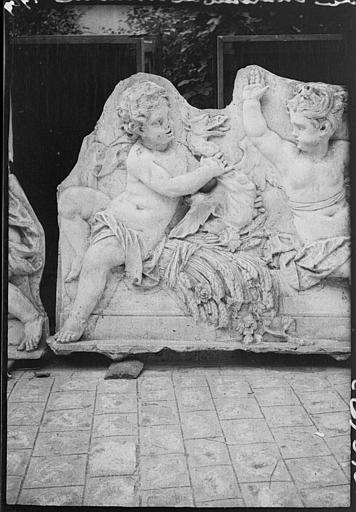
Summer, upper vestibule, 1708

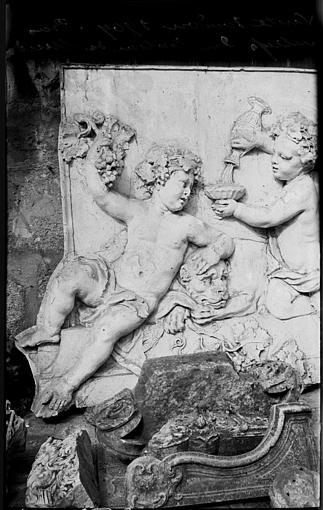
Autumn, upper vestibule, 1708

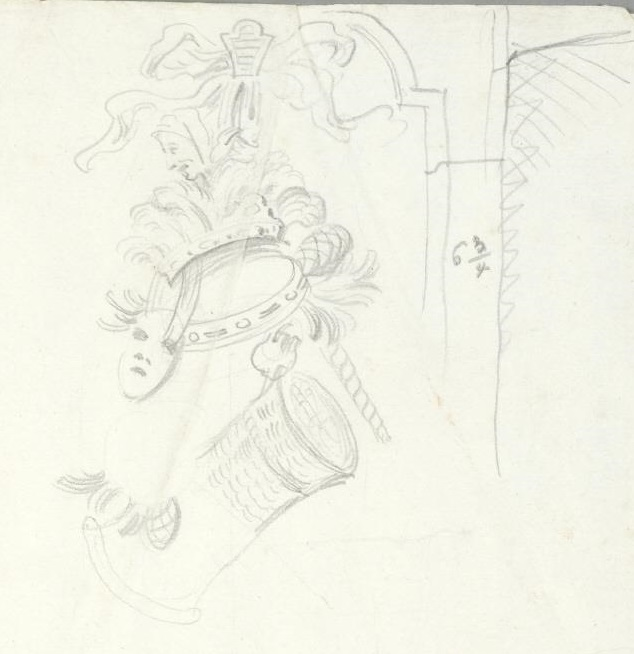
Décor of the upper vestibule. Stockholm, NMH CC 1078

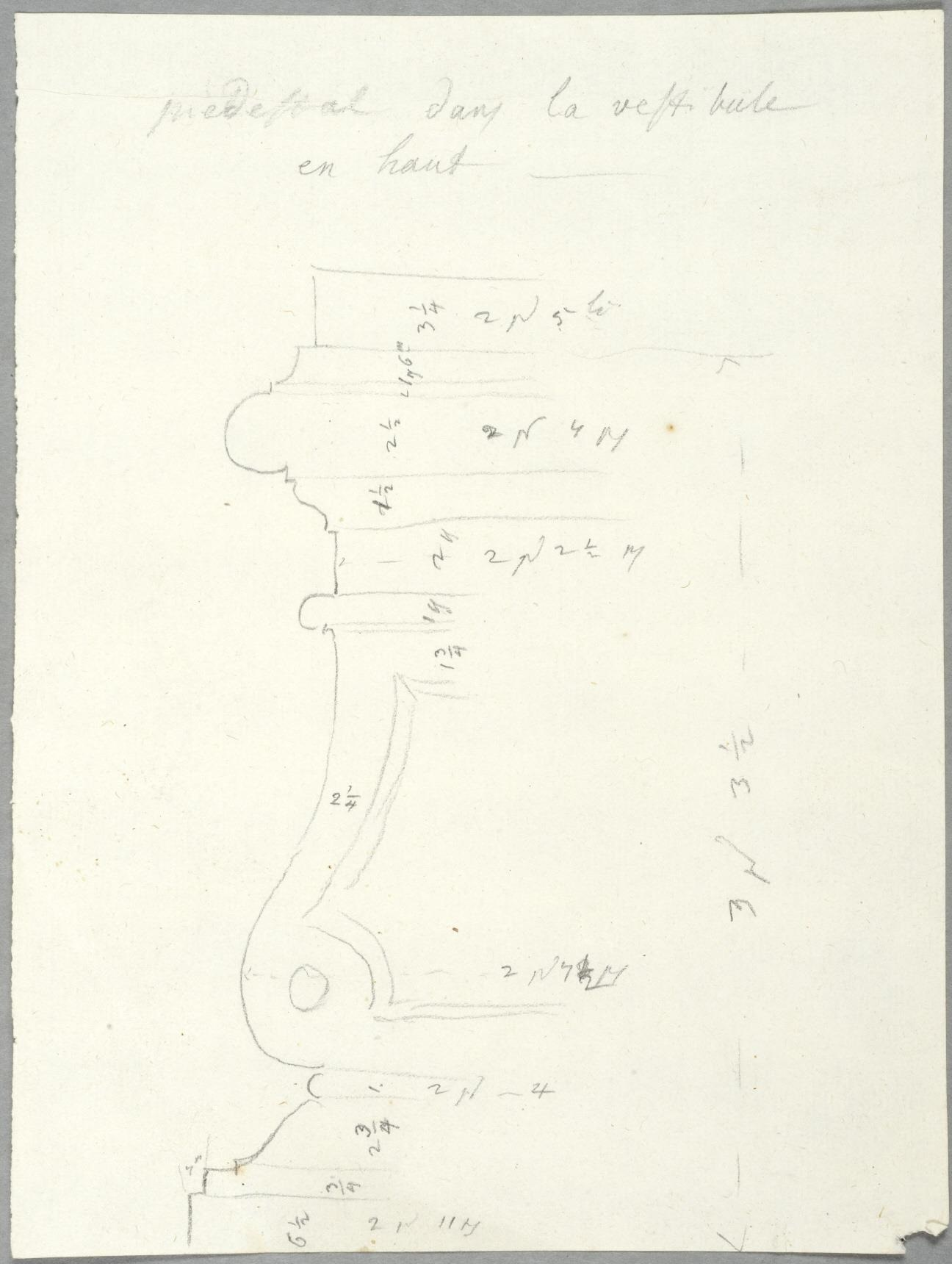
Pedestal of the vestibule. Stockholm, NMH CC 1073

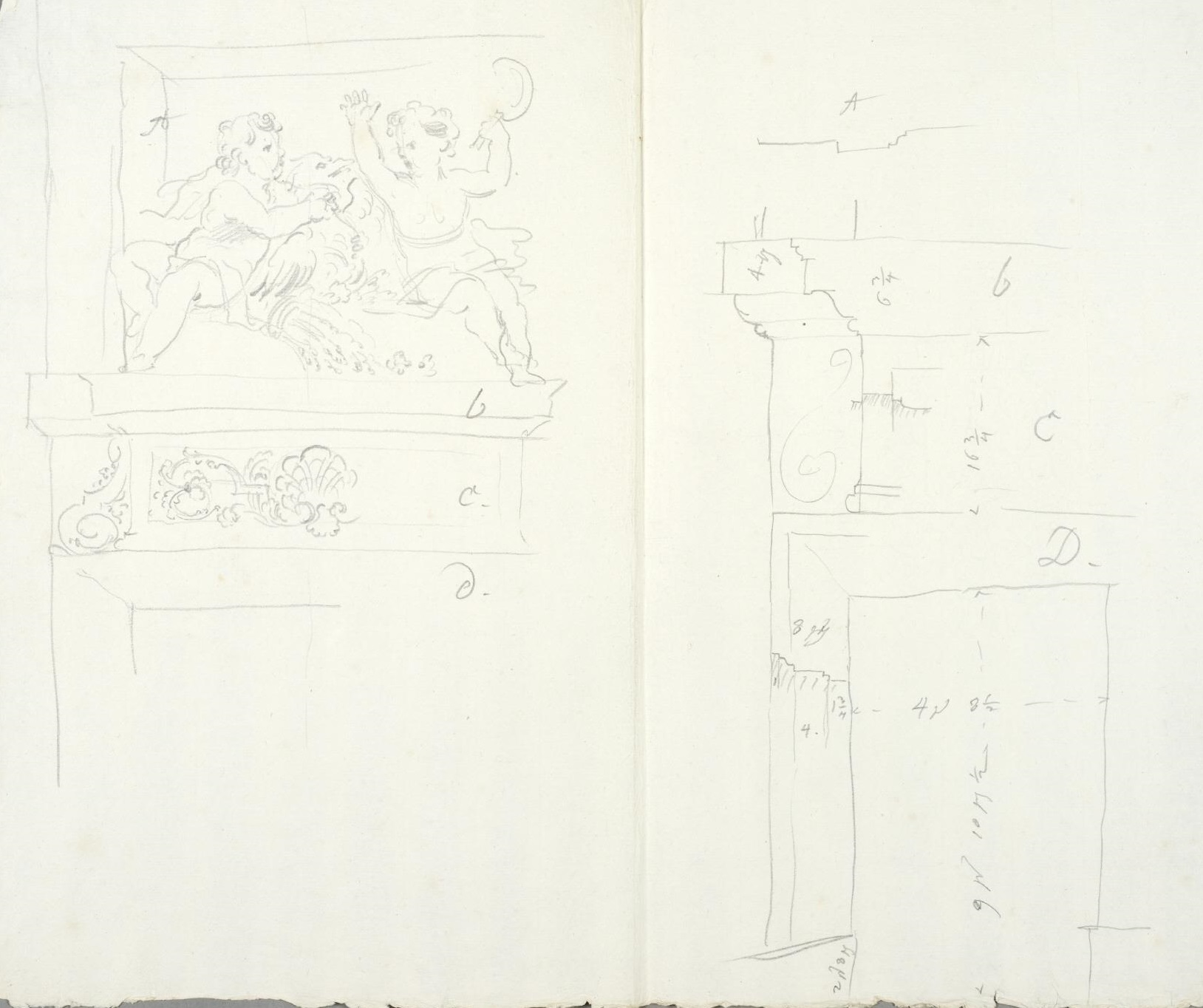
Décor of the upper vestibule. Stockholm, NMH CC 1074

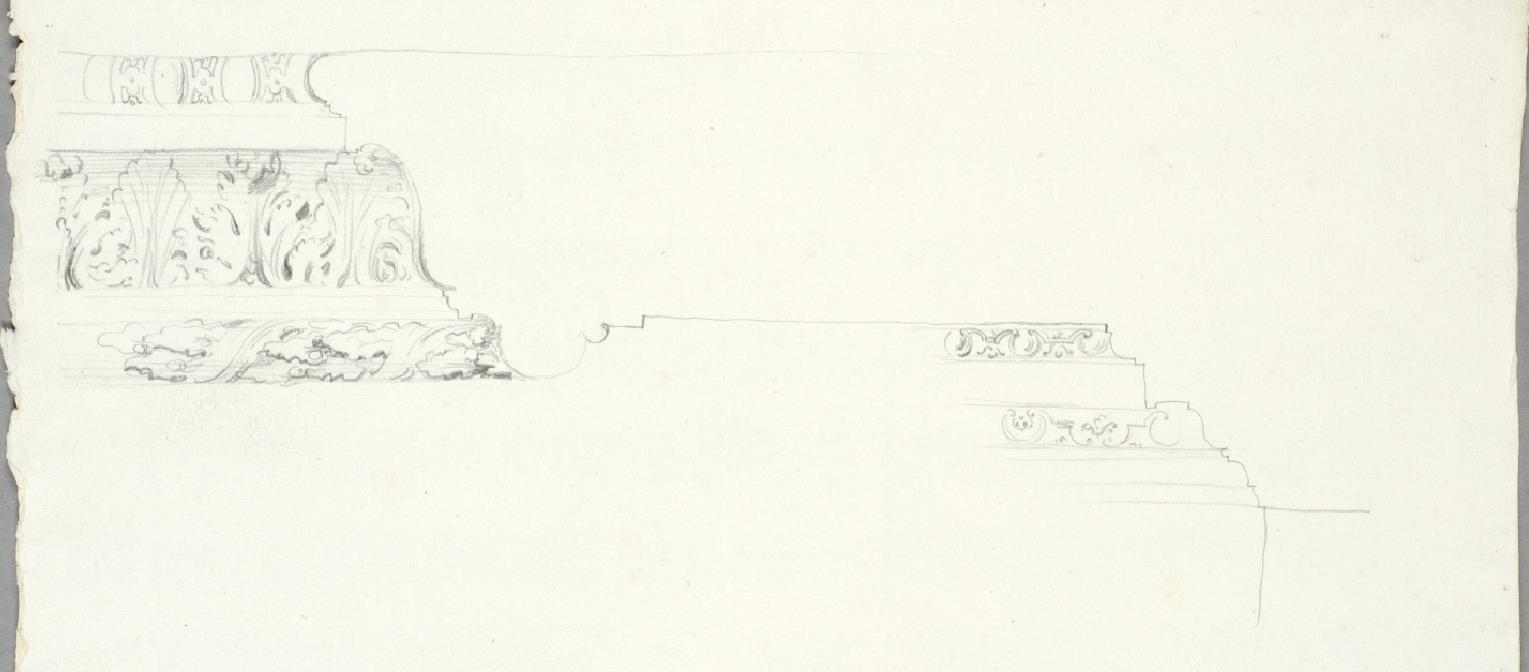
Detail of the cornice in the upper vestibule, National museum of Stockholm, NMH CC 1074

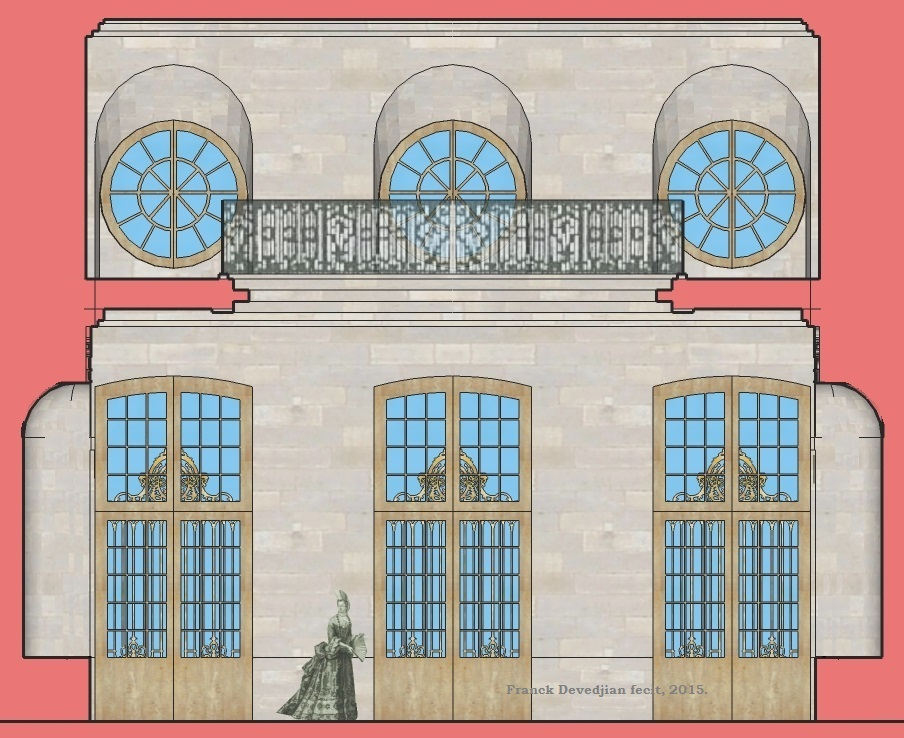
Cutaway of the upper vestibule, which functions as an Italianate salon

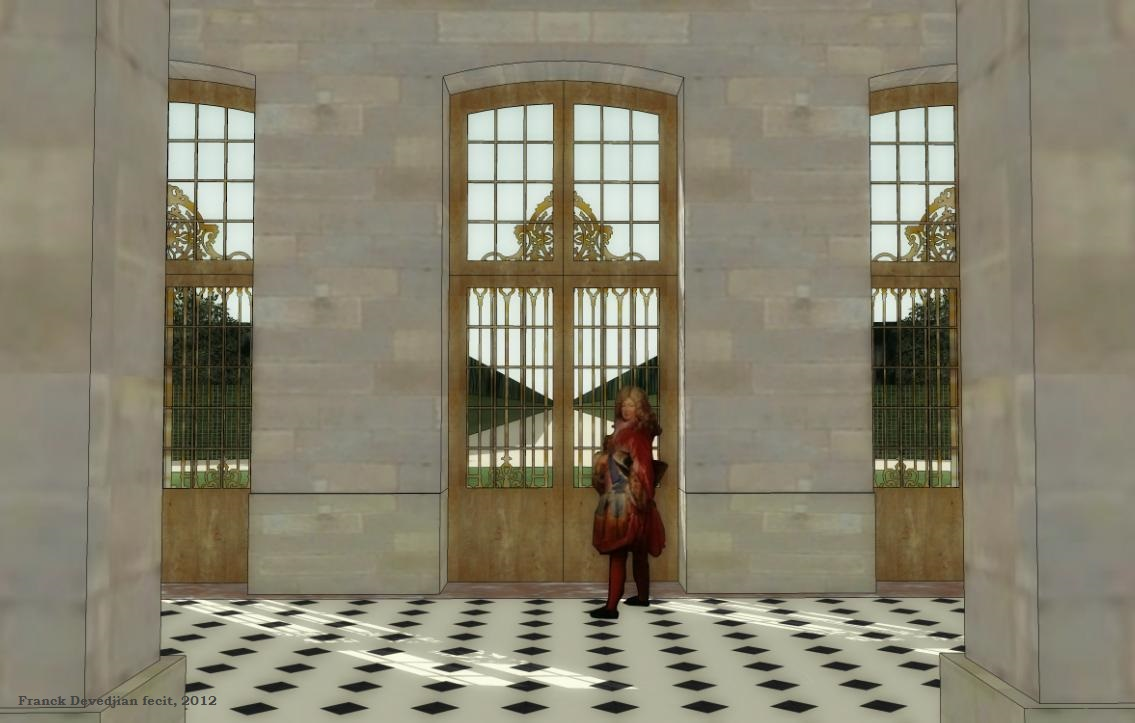
Reconstruction, seen from the upper vestibule

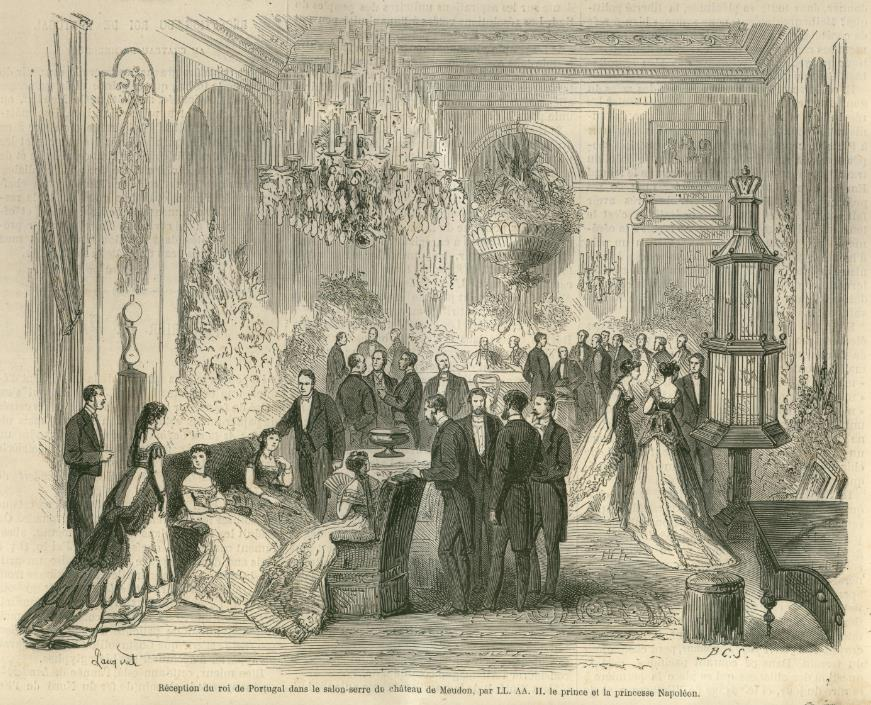
Reception of Louis I of Portugal by Prince Napoleon, upper vestibule, 1867

==== The guardroom ====
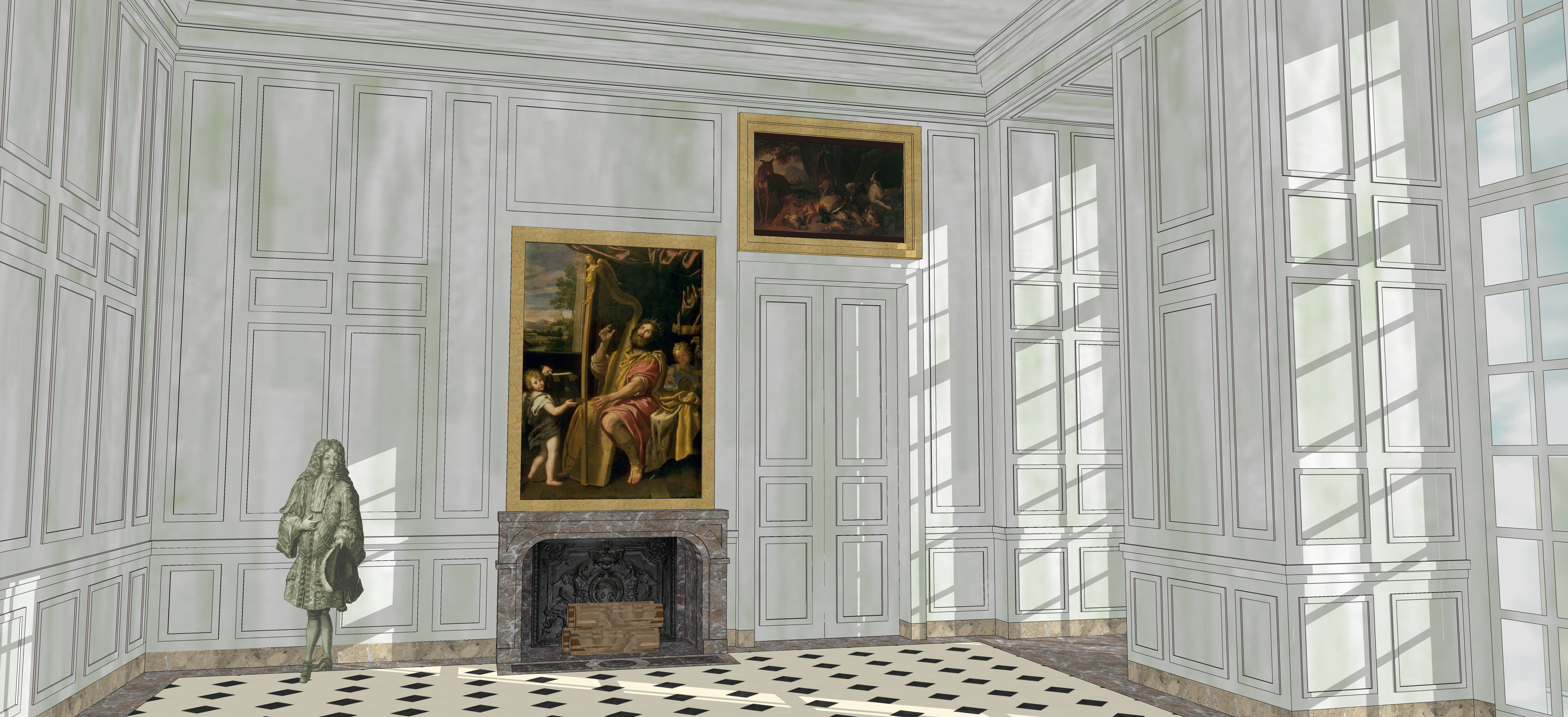
Essai de restitution de la salle des gardes du château-neuf de Meudon, état vers 1709, lors de sa création.

This central room overlooked the flower beds through three rectangular windows (preserved bays). At its creation, it was lined with molded woodwork. On the mantelpiece was a copy of the David of Dominiquin. Louis XIV was particularly fond of this painting. Two paintings were ordered from the side exits: 1. a dog, and a greyhound, on the front in the middle of the game, scattered on the ground ducks partridges beccasses and hare in the middle A game-bag has a tree "; 2. a "hare that is attached to a tree by its left foot, on the left a dog at the feet of which are four partridges and a pheasant, on the front of the table a gun and its supply".

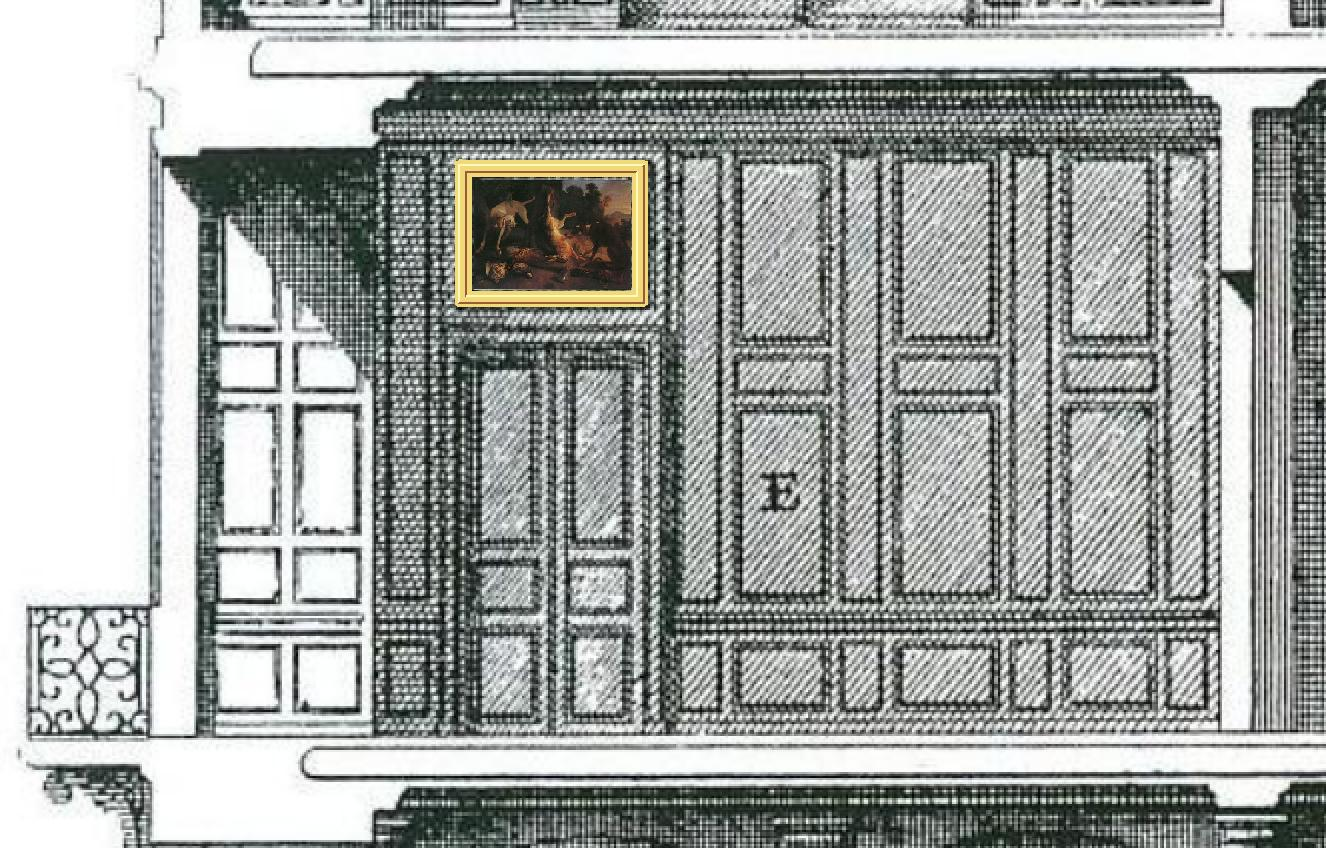
Cutaway of the guard room. Mariette. Shows positioning of the table of Desportes

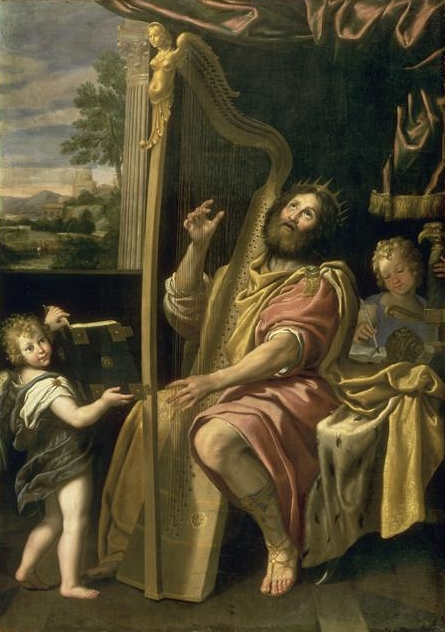
The David, by Domenichino, copy above the chimney

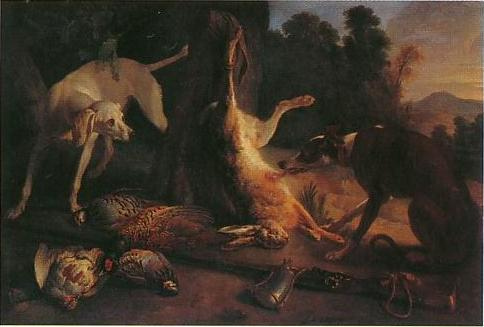
A sleeping dog, and a greyhound, François Desportes. 1709

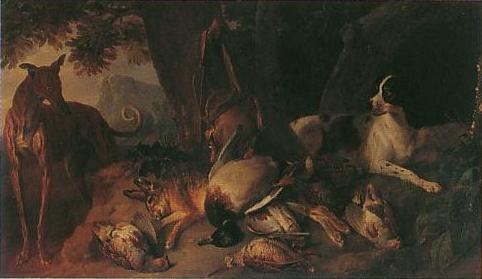
A hare tied to a tree, François Desportes, 1709

==== The first antechamber ====
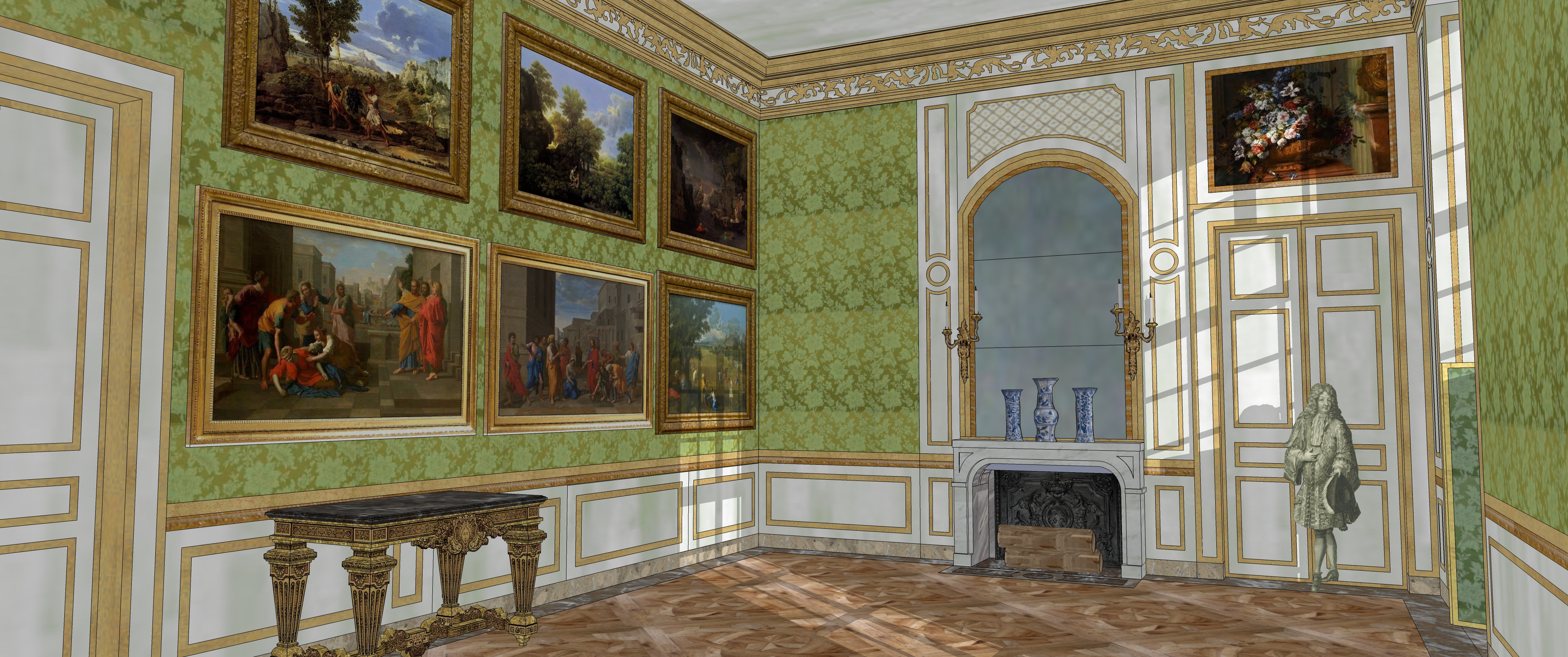
Essai de restitution de la première antichambre de Monseigneur au Château-Neuf, vers 1709–1711. Le Grand Dauphin avait placé au sein du château-neuf de nombreuses toiles de Nicolas Poussin, dont les Saisons conservées au Louvre.

In 1775, the piece is described in the following way: "Antechamber or dining room in suitte. Room illuminated by two windows in the Levant, paneling of apui, cornice carved. Chimney of white marble vene (...) Two paintings above the doors, painted on canvas. One represents a golden vase, set on a marble pedestal, with a garland falling in festoons, and fruits. On the pedestal are limes, grenades and grapes, crimson curtain and sky background, the other represents a golden bronze vaze, surrounded by a garland of flowers posed on a fullte of green marble, beside is a vase Of silver overturned with a figure of a woman in the form of an anchor. These two paintings are from Fontenay ". The middle of the room is adorned with "a table of black mastic with flowers and birds in the natural".

==== The second antechamber ====
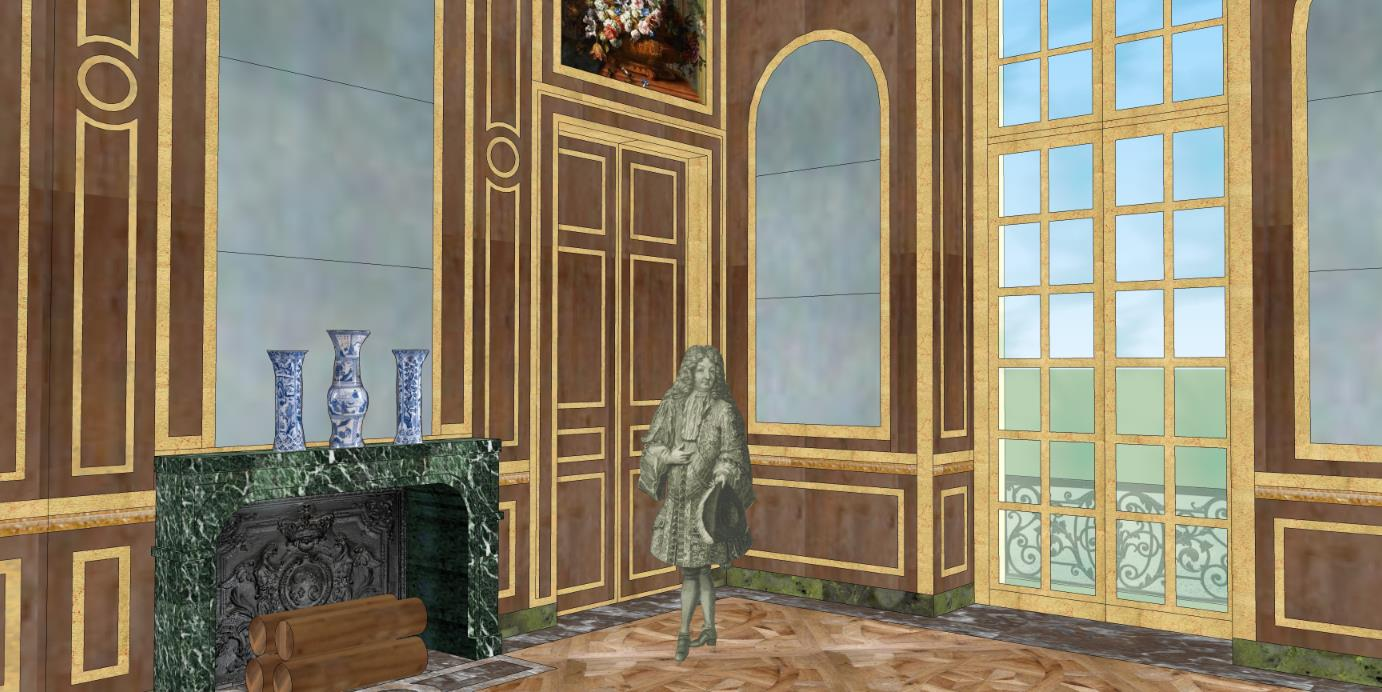
Essai de restitution of the antechamber of the château-neuf in Meudon, c. 1709–1711. La pièce était boisée à la Capucine and gilded

When the Château-Neuf was finished in 1709, on avait disposé two paintings ordered from Fontenay, comme pour toutes les autres pièces de l'appartement, ce qui uniformisait le décor, à savoir : "A golden vase with two handles, surrounded by a garland of fruit, placed on a table of porphire, which is furnished with grapes; On the right, a basket filled with Italian grapes, cucumber, pomegranate and flowers; on the left, a crimson curtain, behind which are several golden basins, one of which is surrounded by a garland of flowers."

A pyramid of fruit resting on a marble table, on which is a melon hung next to a pomegranate; On the right, on the same table, an orange tree in a porcelain vase; On the same table, on the left, a large golden vase surrounded by a garland of flowers, at the foot of which is another silver vase reversed, a golden dish, a corner of which is hidden by a purple curtain of the same dimensions as the preceding.

The inventory of 1775 indicates that it is a:

"Room illuminated by a cross in the Levant, paneled high, scultée, gilded and varnished on wood, cornice in plaster scultée and gilded idem. The chimney of green-campan. (...) Two paintings above the doors, painted on canvases, each of width on height. The first one represents Apollo and Daphne, this god pursues this nymph who takes refuge in the arms of his father's river Peneus. The second represents the triumph of Acis and Galathea. The first of these paintings is by Antoine Coypel, the second is Corneille (the elder)".

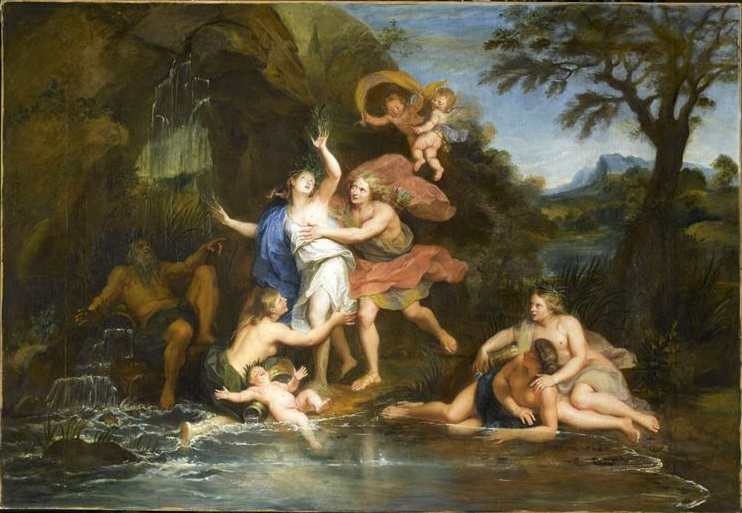
Apollo and Daphne, Antoine Coypel. Musée de Versailles

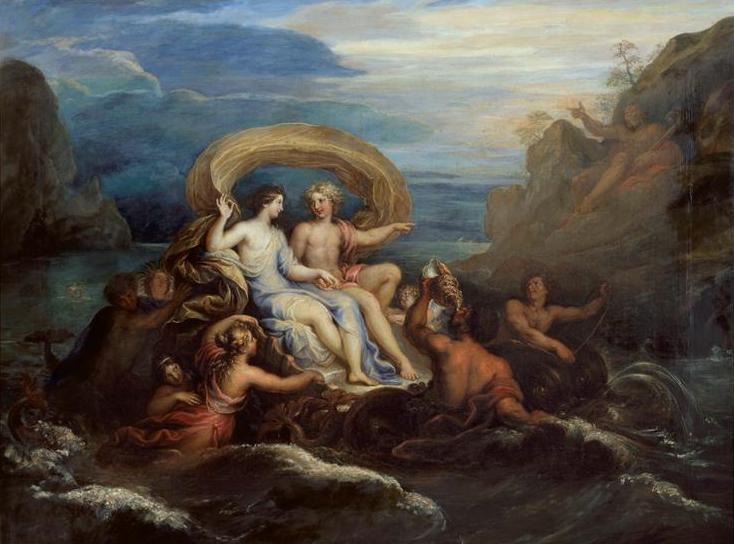
Acis and Galatée, Michel Corneille, Musée de Versailles

==== Monseigneur's Parade Chamber ====
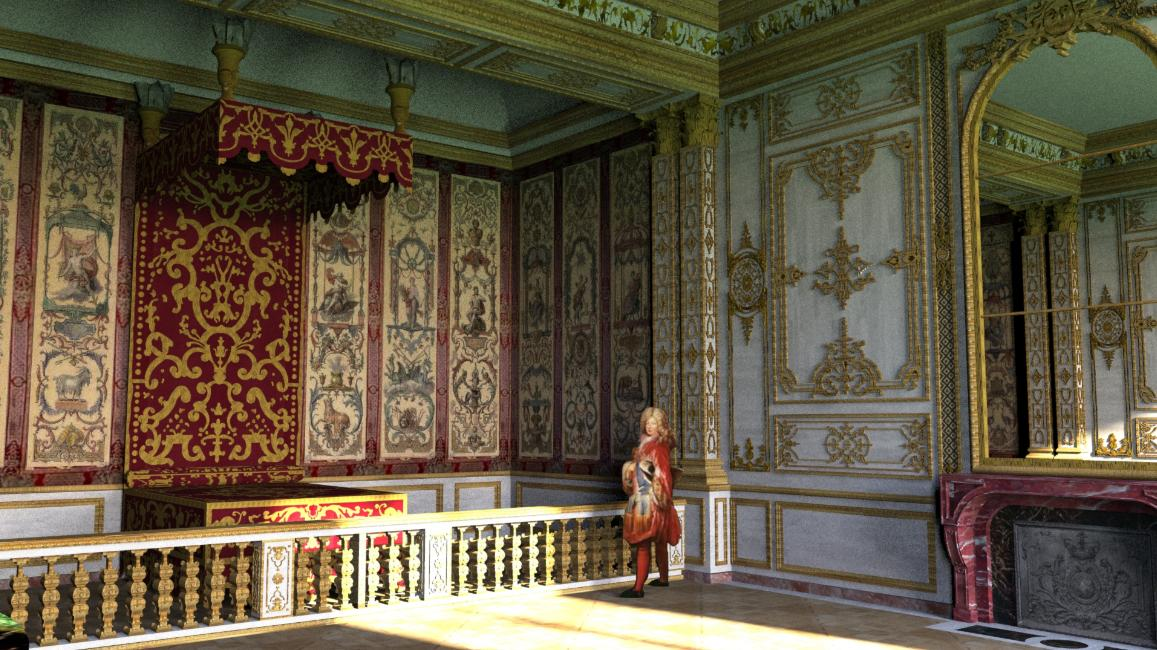
3D rendition of the parade chamber of Monseigneur at the chateau-neuf of Meudon, condition in around 1710–1711. Franck Devedjian and Hervé Grégoire, 2014

The 1775 inventory indicates the following decorations in the parade chamber: The room is illuminated by two windows on the east, wooden panelling, varnished and gilded on wood, sculpted and gilded cornice, large alcove supported on pilasters. Two paintings above the doors, painted on canvas, each 4 feet 9 inches wide by 3 feet 3 inches high. One represents a golden vase filled with different flowers, set on a marble ledge. In the background are two columns surrounded by garlands of flowers. The other represents a golden vase with a handle filled with different flowers, placed on a stone stack, beside another alabaster vase. And on the other side an end of drapery that falls over the edge of the plinth. These two paintings are by Fontenay. [In the margin] In this room, under the mirrored piers, are two long green Campan marble tables supported on gilded and sculpted console feet.

Originally, the alcove was decorated with 12 "grotesque" tapestries designed by Claude Audran III for Gobelins, nine of which still exist. The inventory of Crown furniture is as follows: "A three-piece basse-lisse tapestry of wool and silk, enhanced with gold and silver, manufactured in Paris at the Gobelins Manufactory and designed by Audran. It represents the divinities who preside over the twelve months of the year on twelve bands of daffodil, under grotesque porticoes of different shapes, accompanied by the attributes of each divinity, grotesques, grooves and ornaments, with the sign of the month. By other narrower stripes, with a purple background, laden with mosaics, and the figures of Louis of France, all in silver, the top and bottom borders like narrow bands, with silver shells and dolphins, the curtain containing 9 aunes 1/8 of course on 3 aunes ¼ high, made expressly for the Monseigneur's chamber, in his apartment in the new castle in Meudon."

Here is the list of the gods attached to the months grotesques:

- "January under the protection of Juno"
- "February under the protection of Neptune"
- "March under the protection of the god Mars and Minerva"
- "April under the protection of Venus"
- "May under the protection of Apollo"
- "June under the protection of Mercury"
- "July under the protection of Jupiter"
- "August under the protection of Ceres"
- "September under the protection of Vulcan"
- "October under the protection of Minerva and Mars"
- "November under the protection of Diane"
- "December under the protection of Vesta"

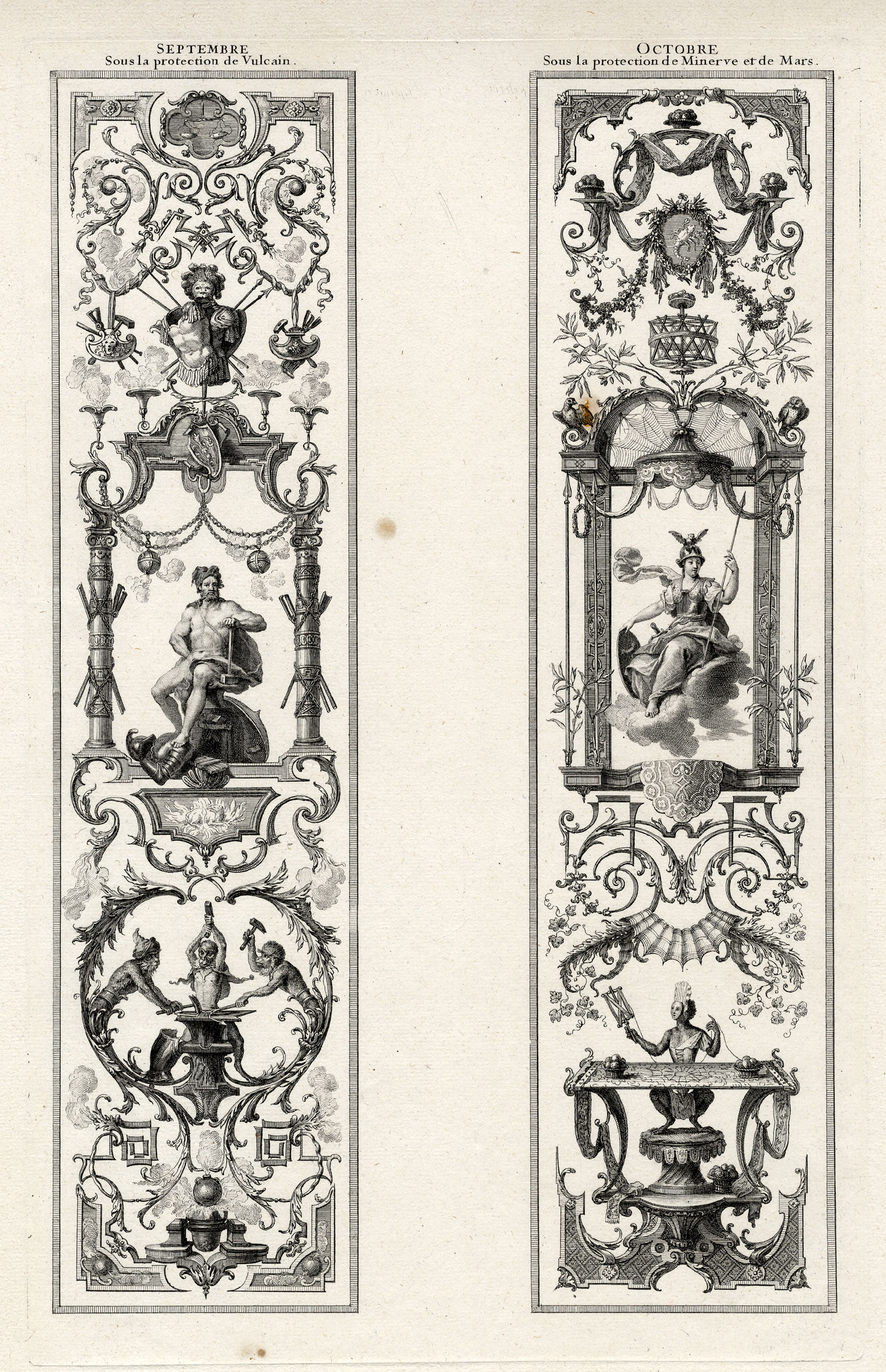
The months of September and of October, Claude Audran III. Parade chamber.

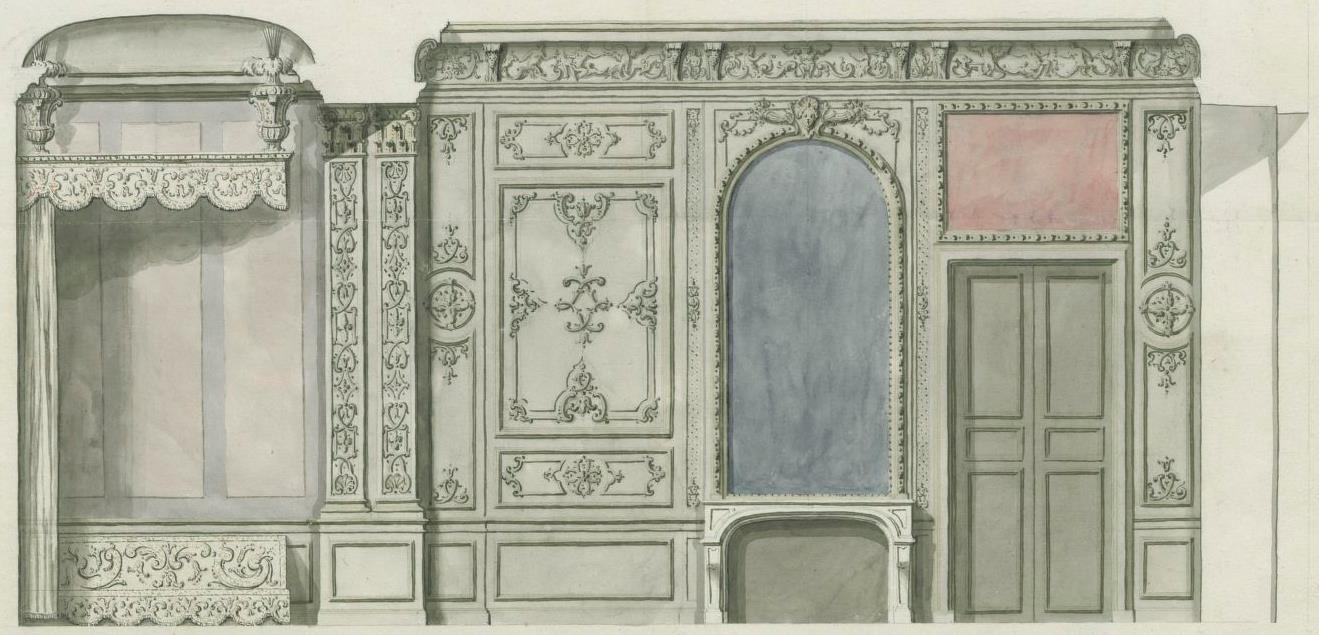
Coupe of the parade chamber in the Château-Neuf of Meudon, circa 1709

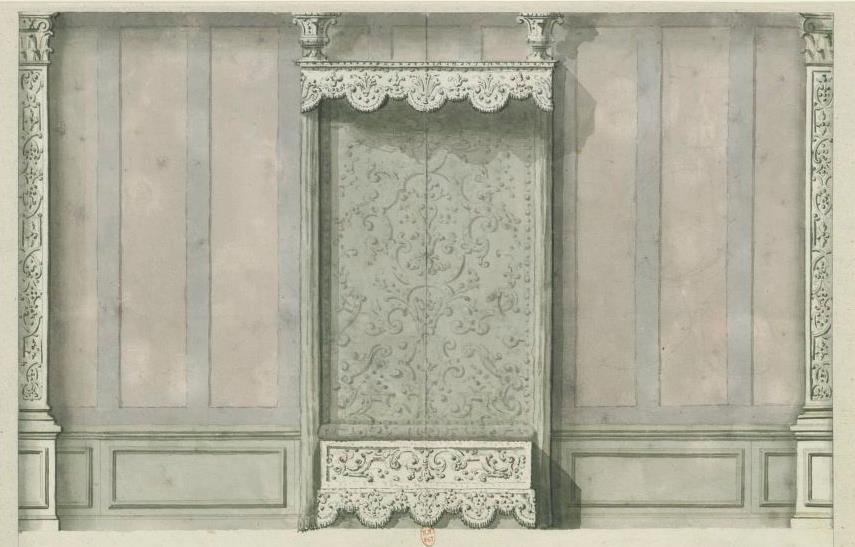
Elévation du fond de la chambre de parade, circa 1708, with the bed

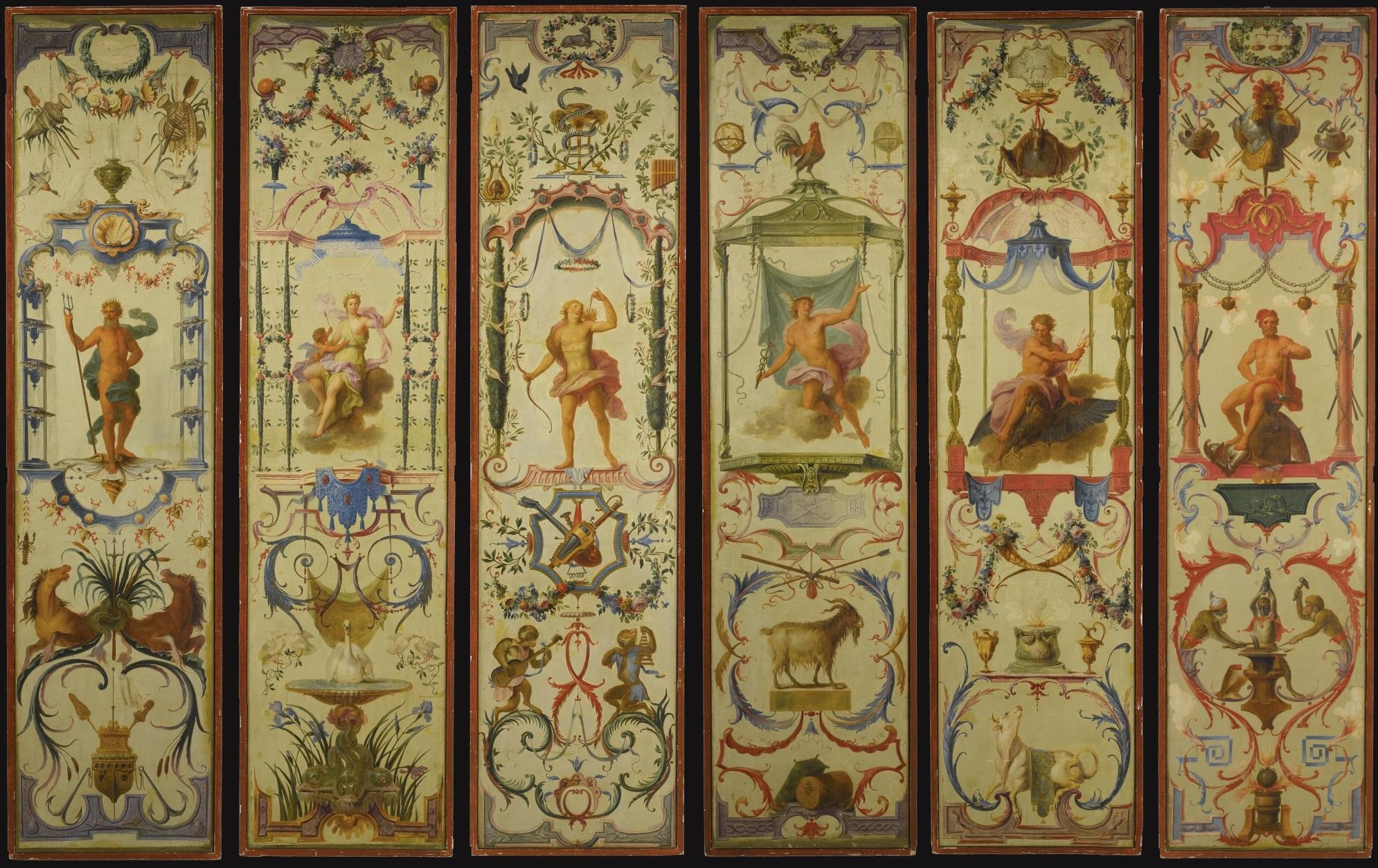
Six des douze mois grotesques, de Claude Audran III, copy of the panneaux pour la tenture réalisée for Meudon. Sotheby's, 18 November 2010, New-York, lot 235

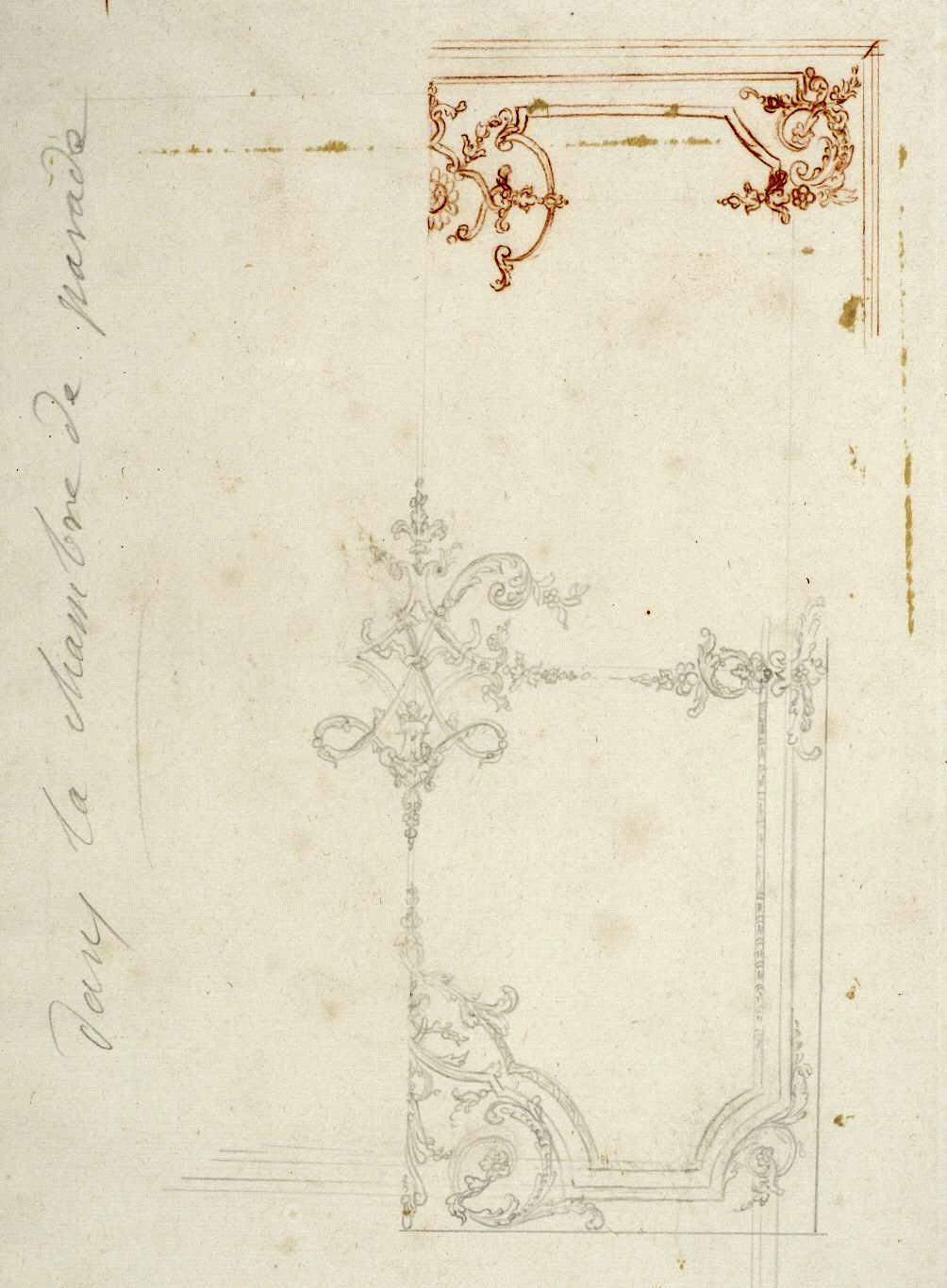
Design of the chamber woodwork. Nationalmuseum, Stockholm, NMH CC 2300

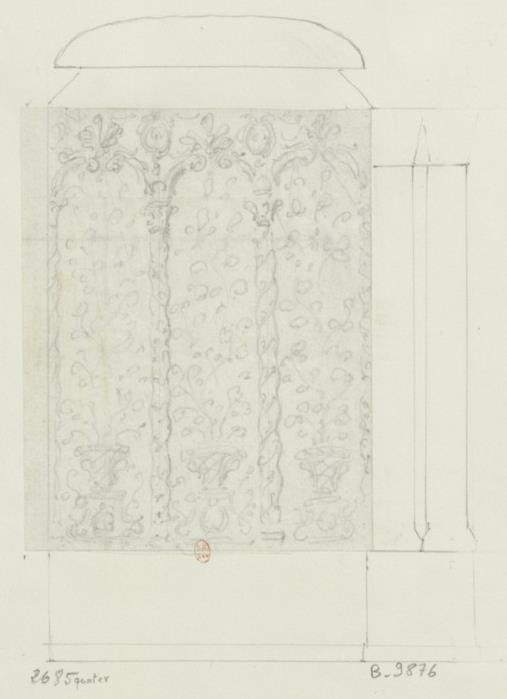
Projet (ultérieur ?) de décor pour l'alcôve (non Versailles), BNF
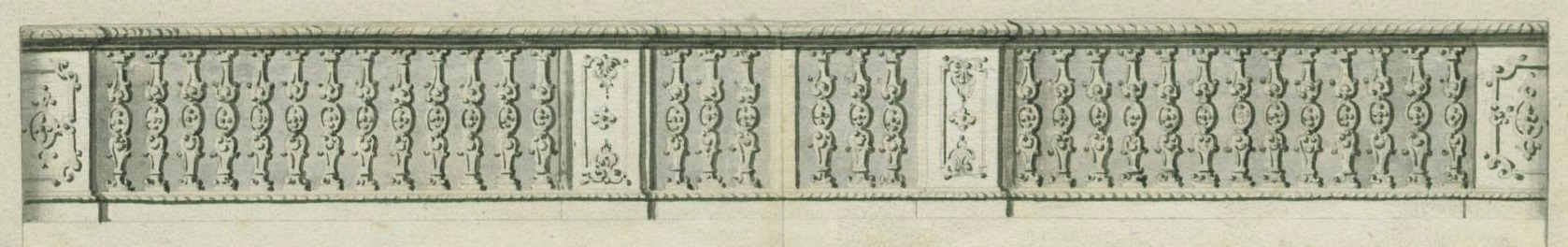
Balustrade in gilded wood from the parade chamber, circa 1708

==== Gallery ====
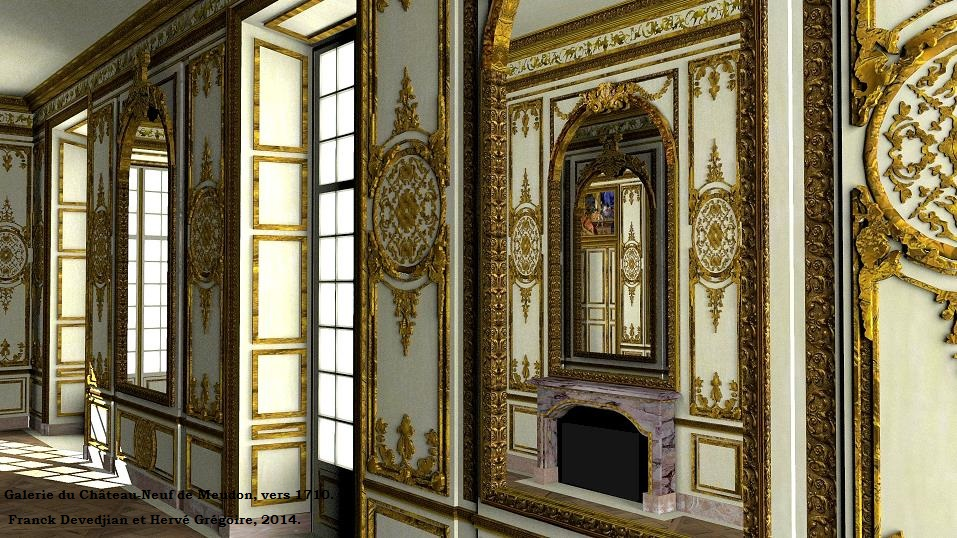
3D rendition of the interior of the gallery of the Château-Neuf de Meudon, with the visual play of the mirrors' reflections. Franck Devedjian and Hervé Grégoire, 2014

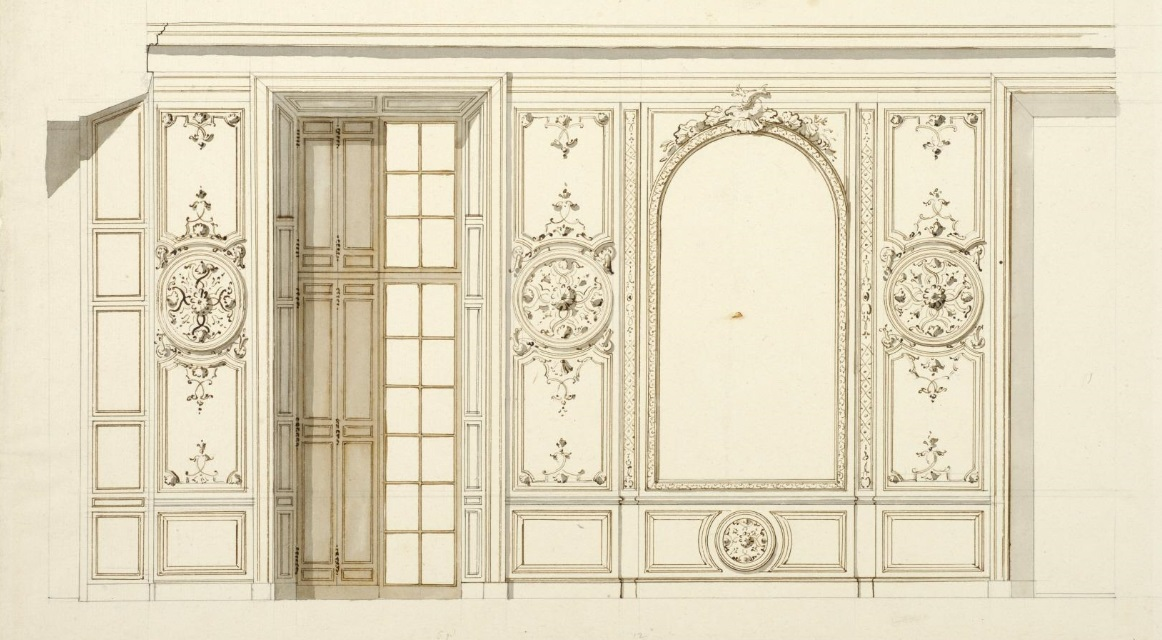
Cross-section of half the gallery of Monseigneur at the Château-Neuf in Meudon, condition in 1709. Nationalmuseum de Stockholm

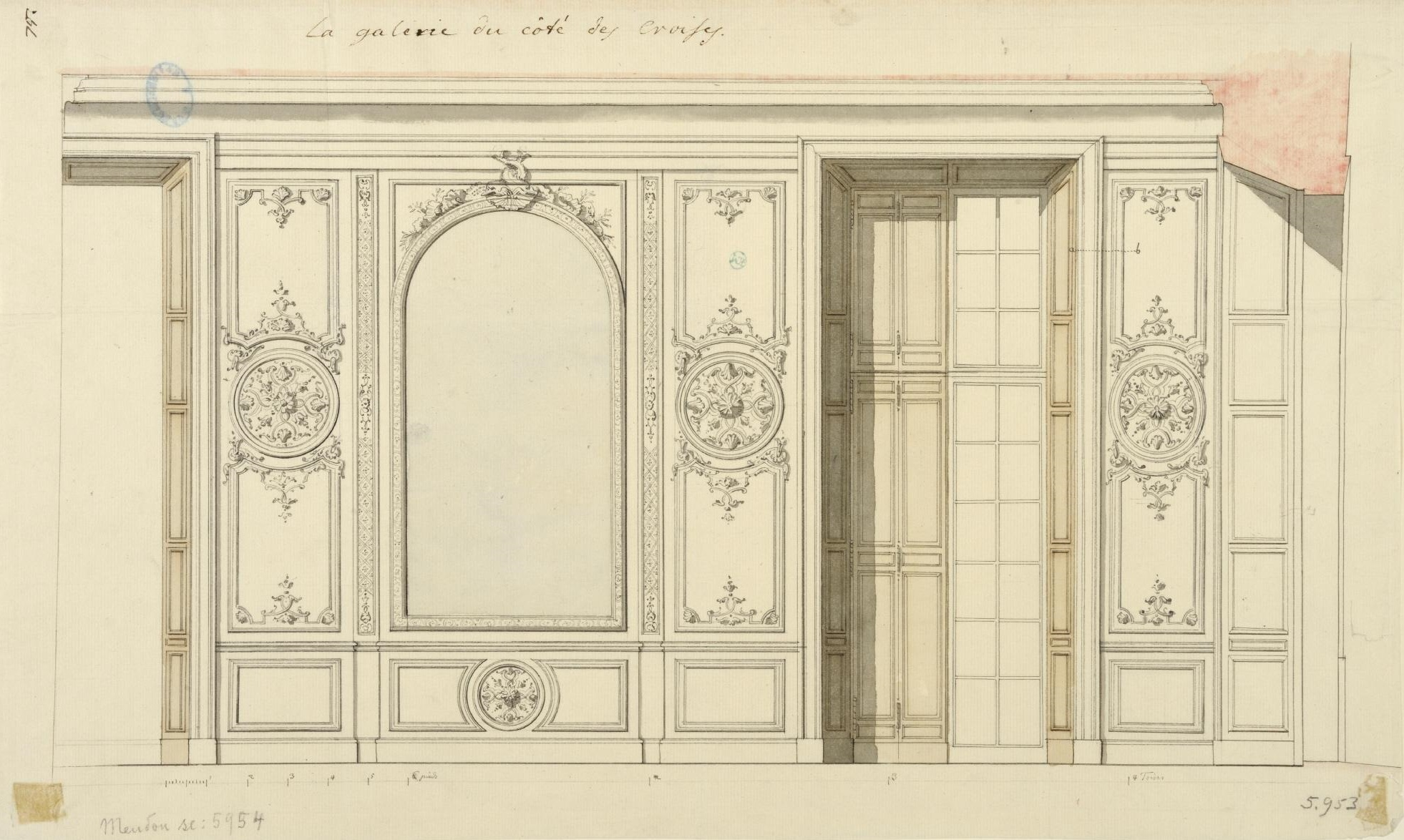
Cross-section of half the gallery. Stockholm, NMH THC 5953

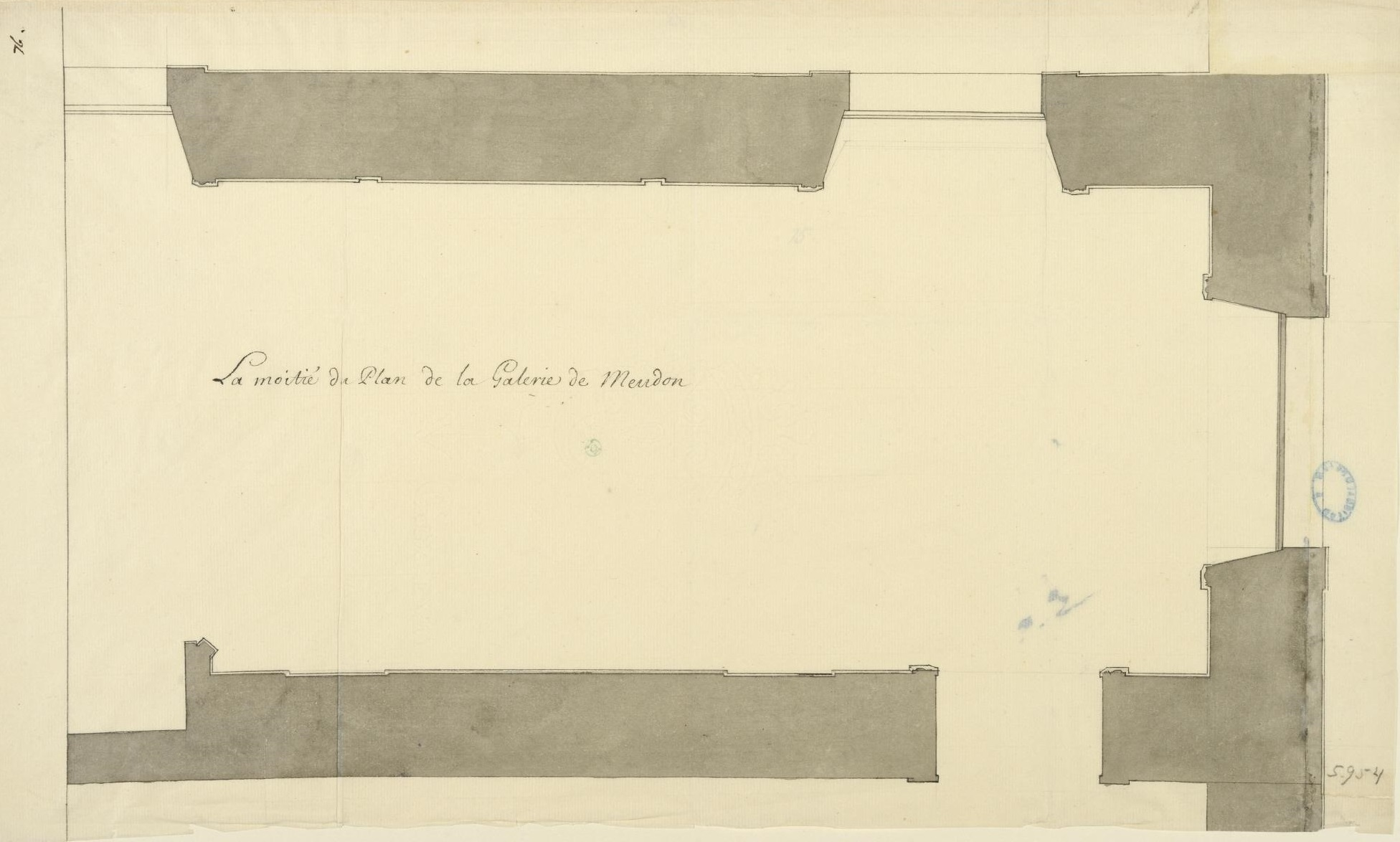
Plan of half the gallery, Stockholm, NMH THC 5954

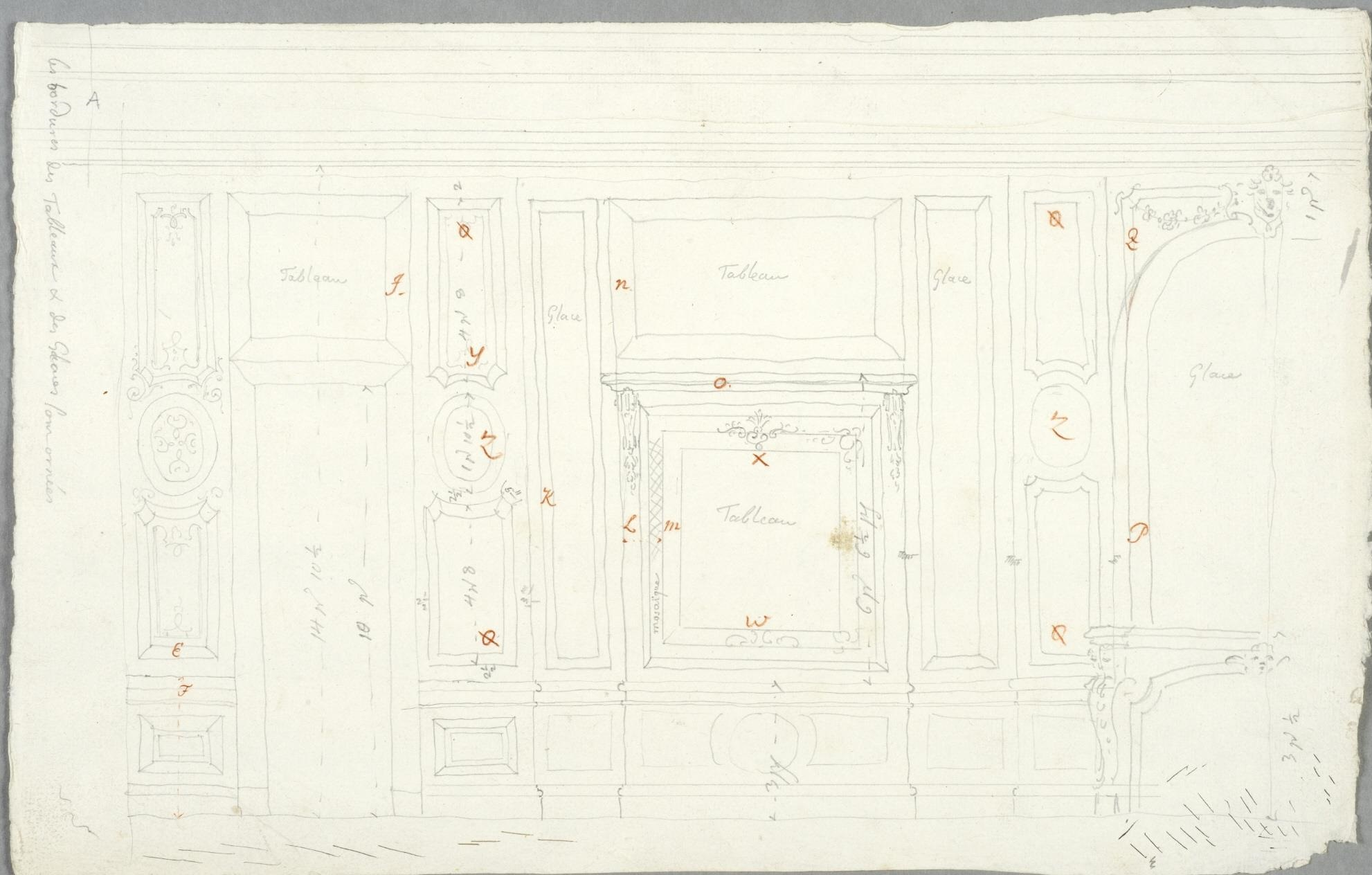
Schéma de l'élévation de la galerie, Stockholm NMH CC 2855

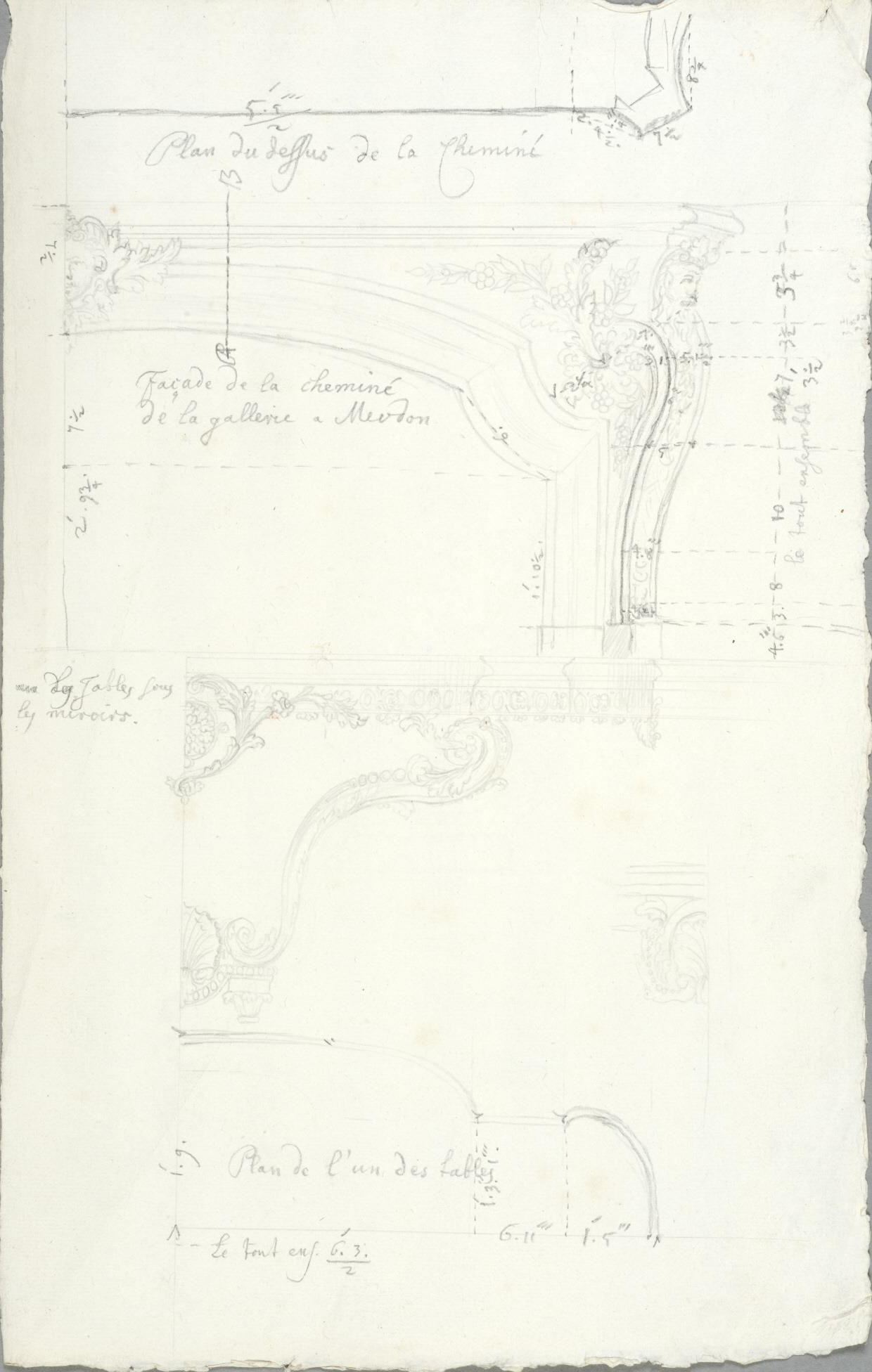
Details of the cheminée et des consoles NMH CC 1105
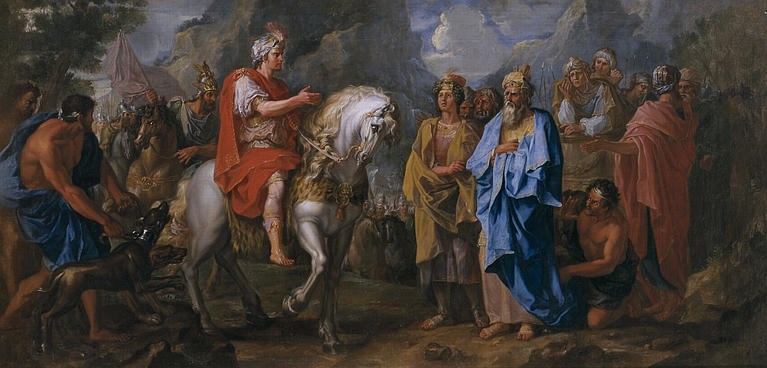
Cyrus interrogeant le roi d'Arménie (Cyrus questioning the king of Armenia), Noël Coypel. Museum of Grenoble

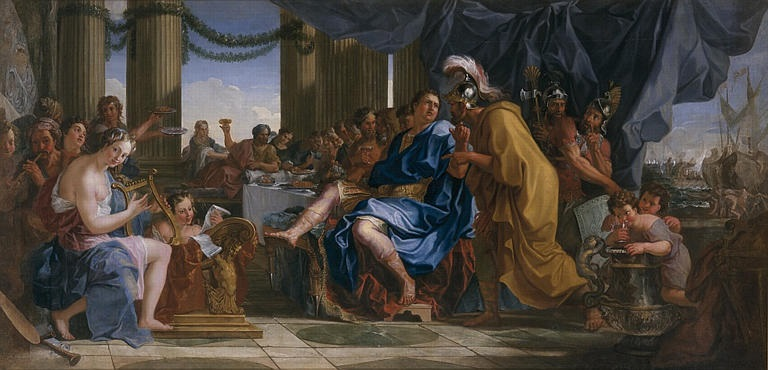
Néron au milieu d'un festin ordonnant la mort d'Agrippine (Nero in the midst of a Feast Ordering the Death of Agippinus), Noël Coypel. Museum of Grenoble

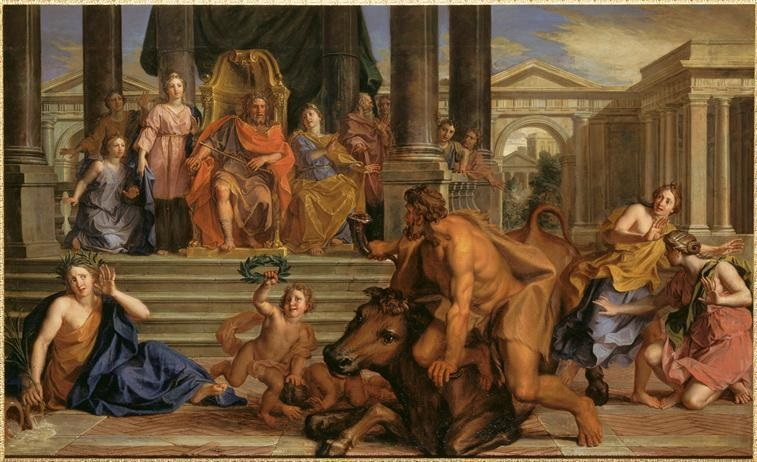
Hercules and Archélaos, Noël Coypel. Musée de Versailles

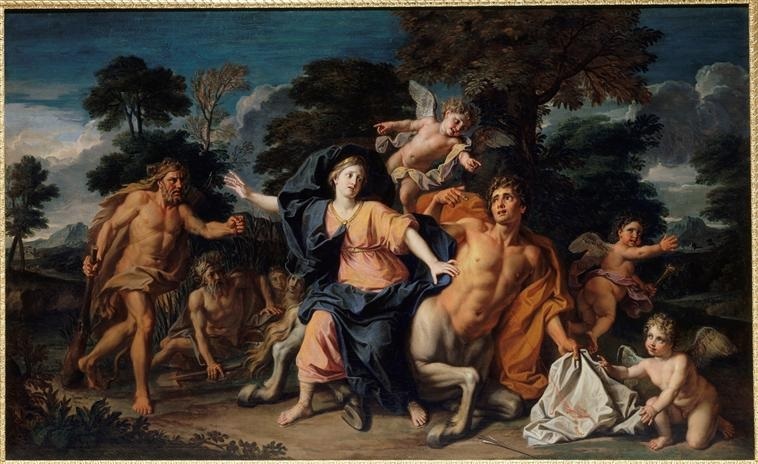
Hercules and Déjanire, Noël Coypel. Musée de Versailles

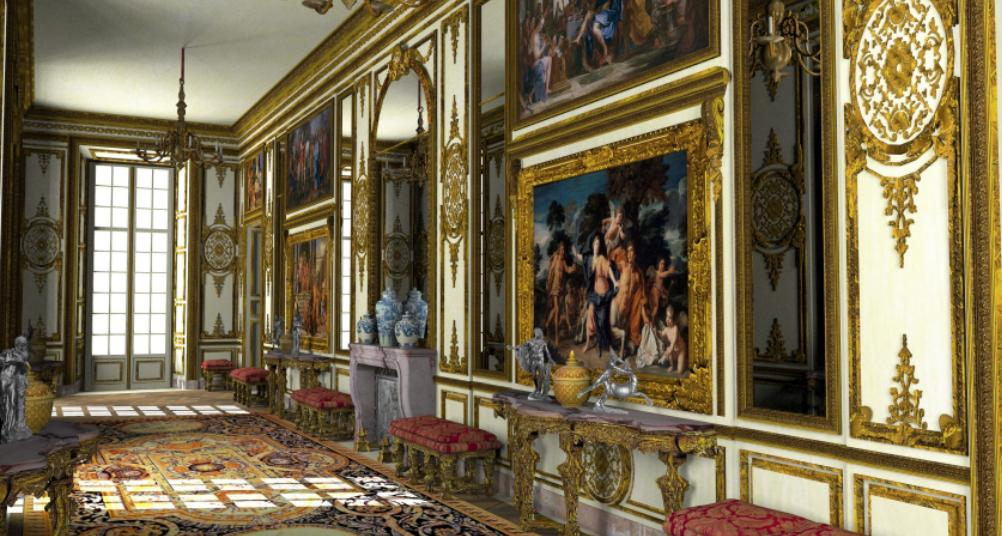
Restitution 3D of the gallery of the château-neuf in Meudon, as it was circa 1709, when it was created. Franck Devedjian and Hervé Grégoire, 2014

=== Orangeries ===
To protect the orange trees from the cold during the winter, two main orangeries were built at Meudon, the largest of which is the Château-Vieux.

==== Orangery of the old castle ====
Traditionally, in French castles since the 18th century, an orangery is a utilitarian building that retains a strong element of monumental composition, constituted here by the terrace, the Castle-Vieux and the loggia. Its dimensions determine the magnitude of the great perspective that extends from the castle to the plateau of Villacoublay.

The orangery was probably built between 1655 and 1659 by the architect Louis Le Vau, for the owner of the estate Abel Servien, superintendent of finance under Louis XIV. Open to the south through eight high windows on either side of a monumental entrance, the orangery is intended to house the park's orange trees during the cold season. During the summer, orange trees were displayed on its floor around a rectangular basin, as well as on the grounds of the castle and cave. The orangery extends eastward with a crude bastion.

Renovated several times in the 19th century, then abandoned until 1980, the parterre of the orangery was restored between 1980 and 1984 to its 17th-century appearance.

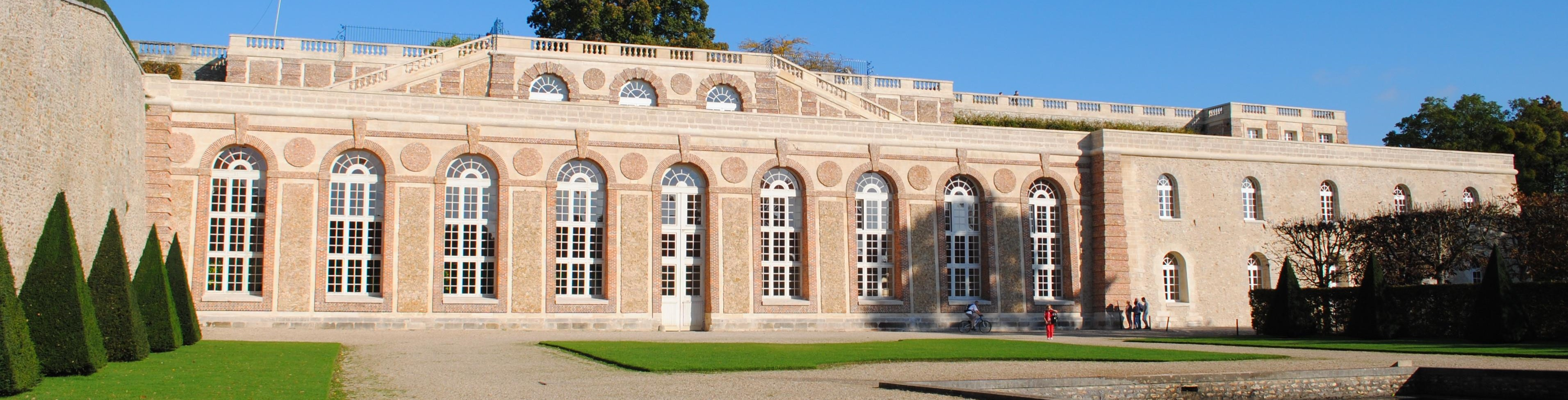
L'orangerie of Meudon, 17th century. Restored in 2012

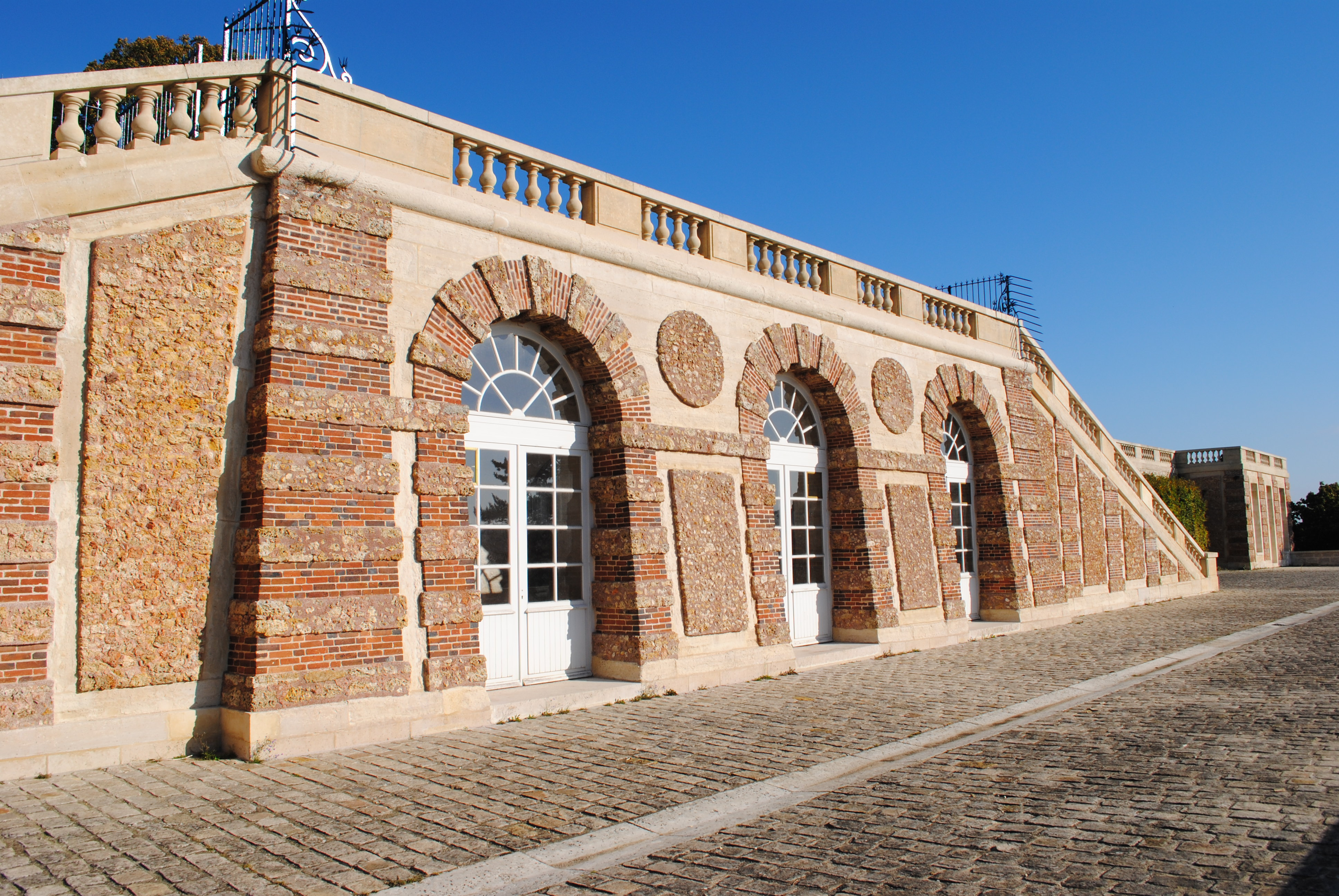
The nymphaeum above the orangery

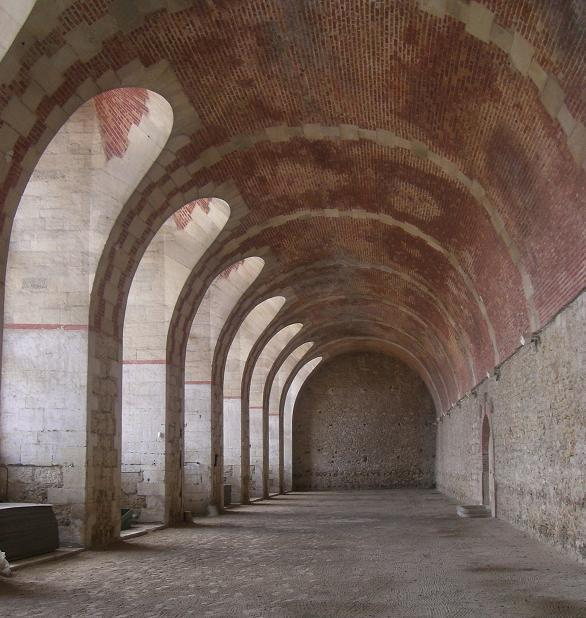
Orangery of Meudon before restoration, 2010

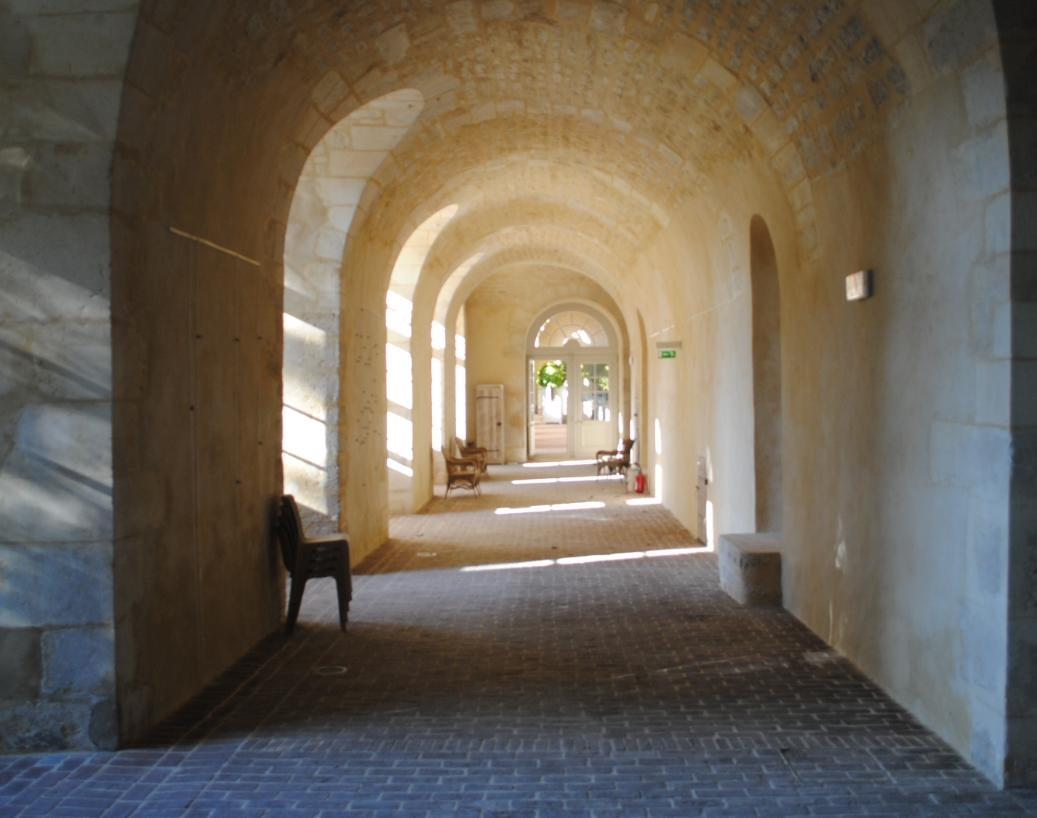
Inside the bastion of the orangery, 2014

==== The Orangery of the new castle ====
It was built at the same time as the Château-Neuf, between 1706 and 1708. It was demolished during the reign of Louis XVI.

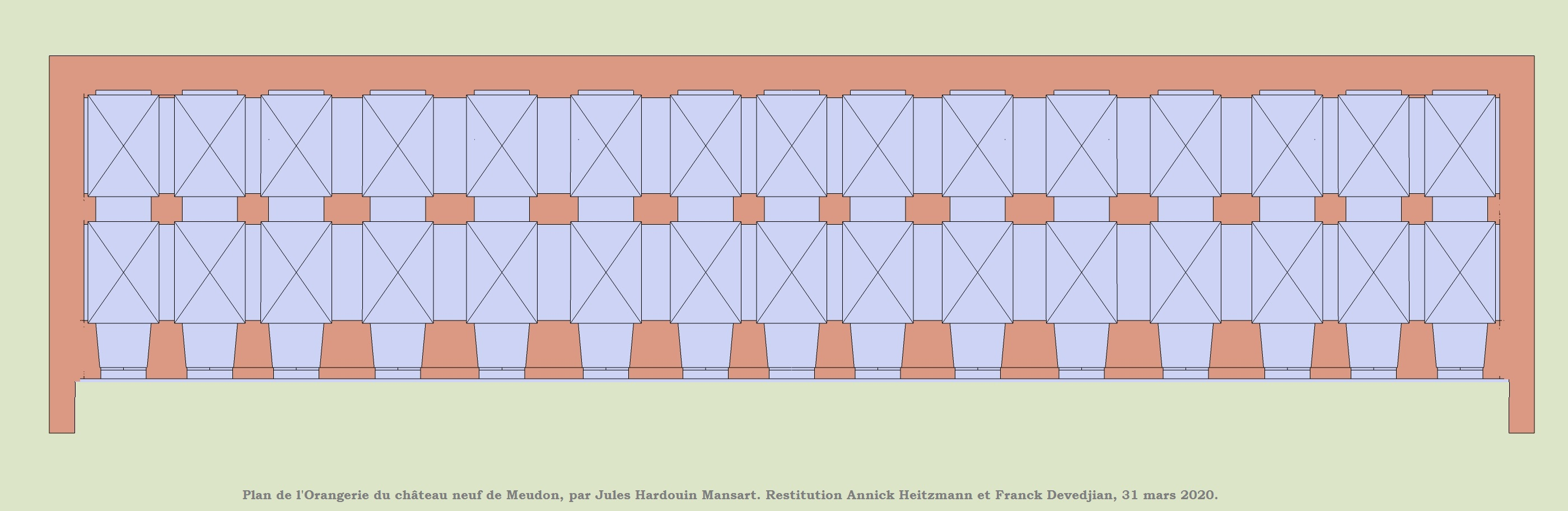
Orangery of the Château-Neuf

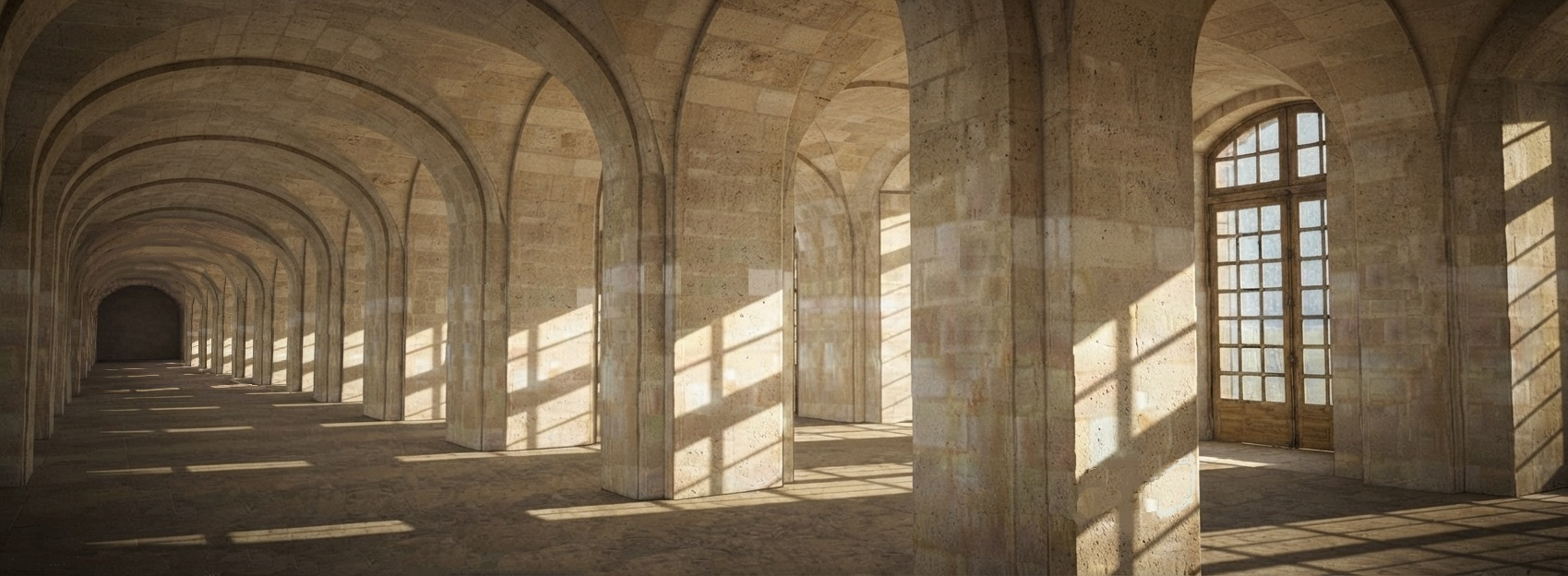
Interior of Orangery, Château-Neuf

==== The greenhouse below the Orangerie du Château-Vieux ====
A third building was used for the conservation of shrubs during the winter. The "greenhouse" was located immediately below the bastion of the Orangery of the old castle in Meudon. There is still the wall at the bottom, enclosed, as well as a buttress. The rest of this building adjoins the back of the garden of the Museum of Art and History of Meudon.

=== Stables ===
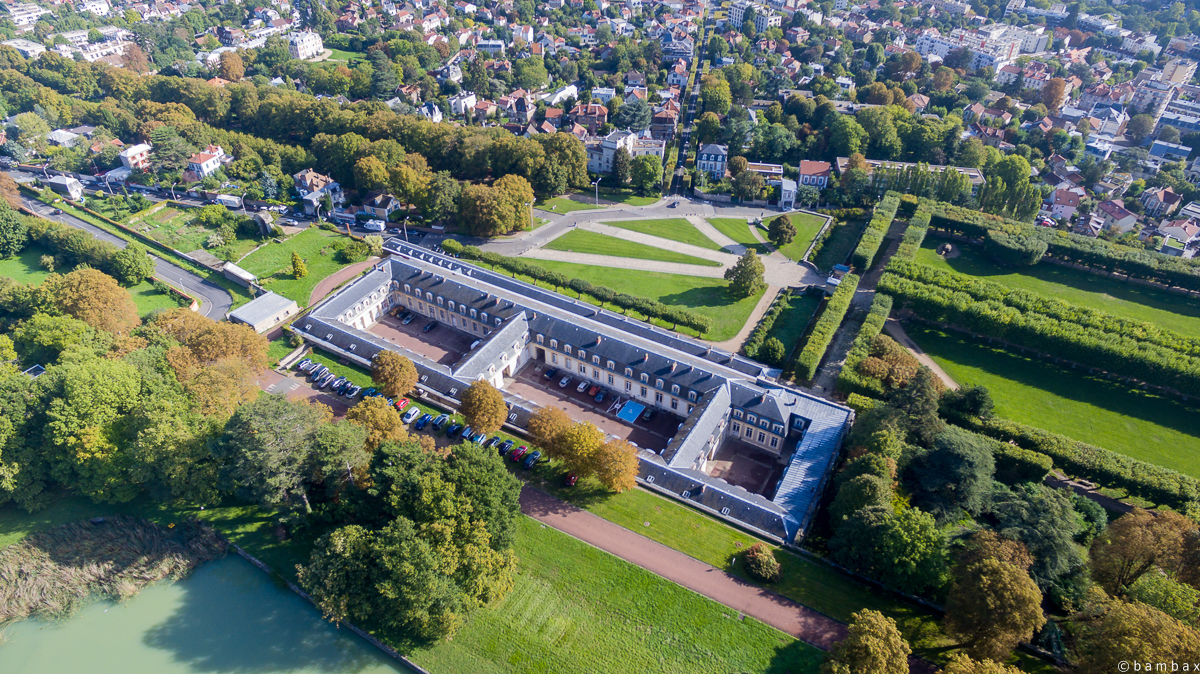
Aerial view of the old stables. September 2015

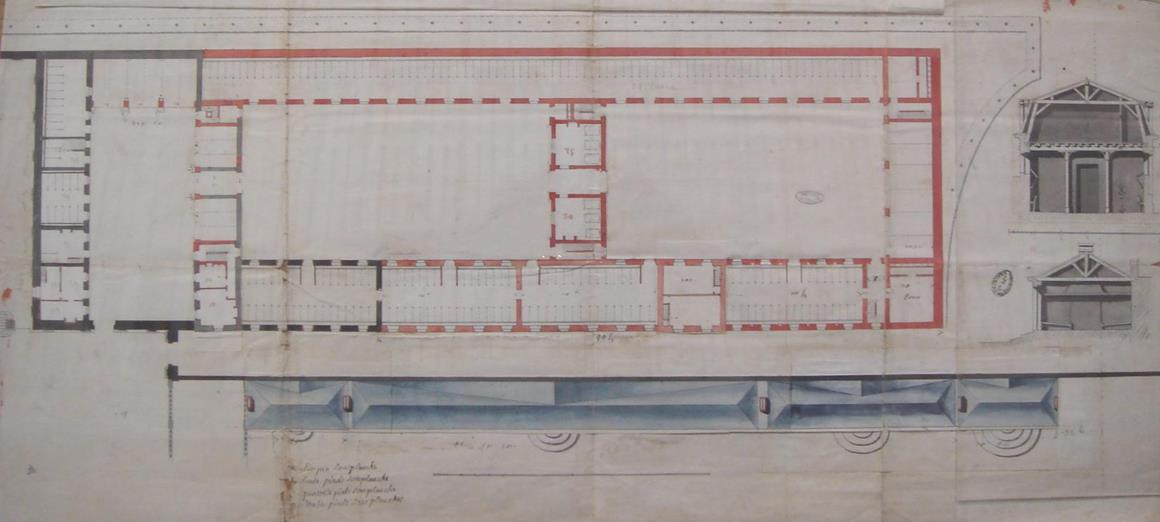
Plan for expanding the kennel and creating the stables, Jules Hardouin-Mansart, 1701

The new commons still exist today, perfectly preserved. They are located at the entrance of the estate, at the top of the avenue to the castle. They were built by extending an earlier building, the kennel of Louvois.

The three inner courtyards connect through a clear central passage for horses. The stables have only one floor, attic, so as not to obstruct the view of Paris from the Pond of Bel Air above. Abundant dwellings for the castle staff furnish this floor.

All the stalls were rebuilt in the 19th century. Some still exist.

Today all of these buildings are assigned to the Observatoire de Paris, which prevents access to all visitors. The commons have a total area of 5,000 m² (2,500 m² on each of the two levels). To this must be added also the area of the adjoining guard-house, of 850 m².

=== Gardens ===
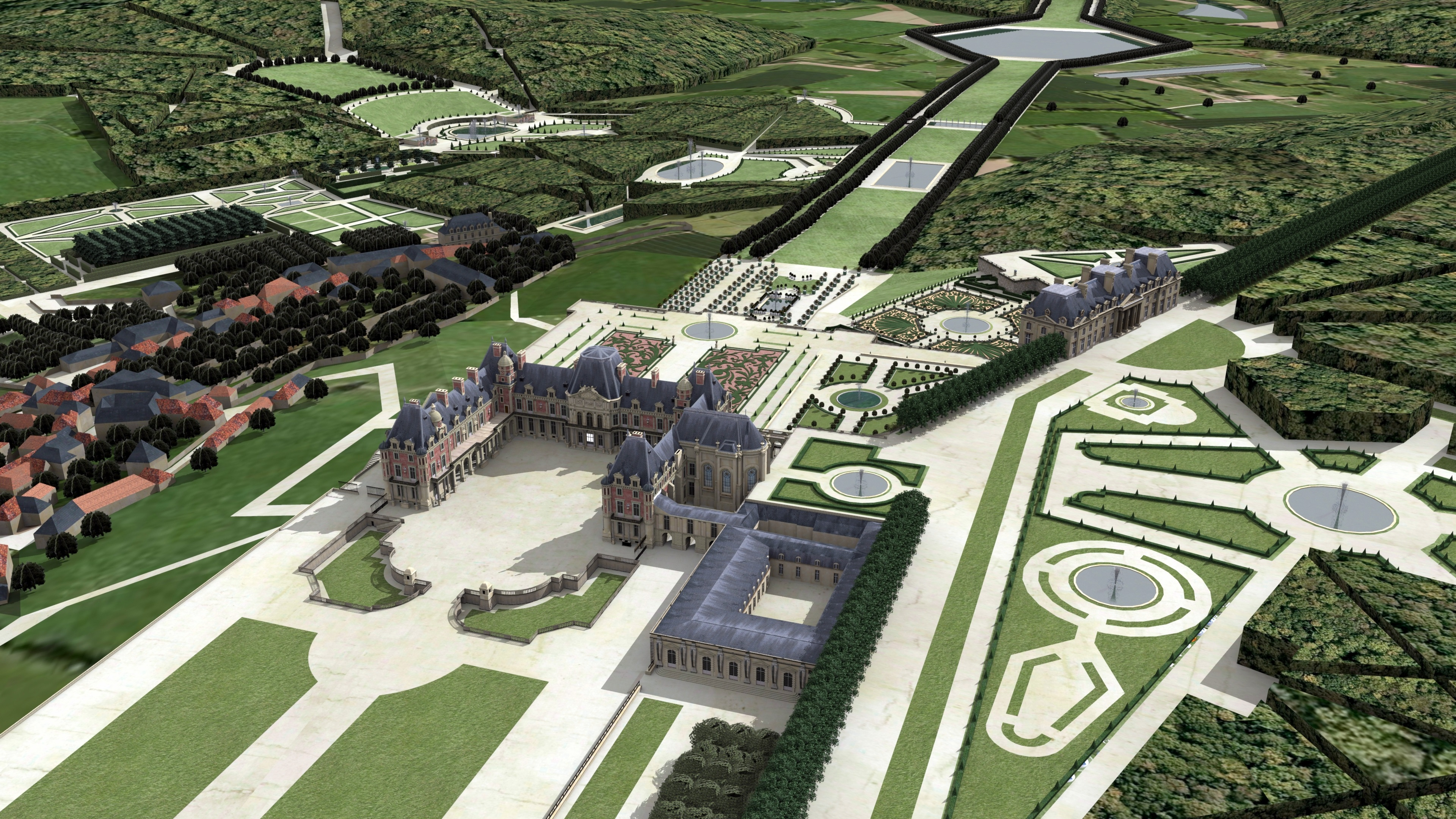
Restitution 3D du domaine de Meudon, vers 1708. Franck Devedjian et Hervé Grégoire, 2012.

The gardens of Meudon were of great magnificence. There were high gardens and low gardens, not to mention the Grande Perspective. The Meudon Way describes the itinerary for discovering Meudon's points of view at the end of the reign of Louis XIV. They are classified as "slope gardens".

==== The Grand Perspective ====
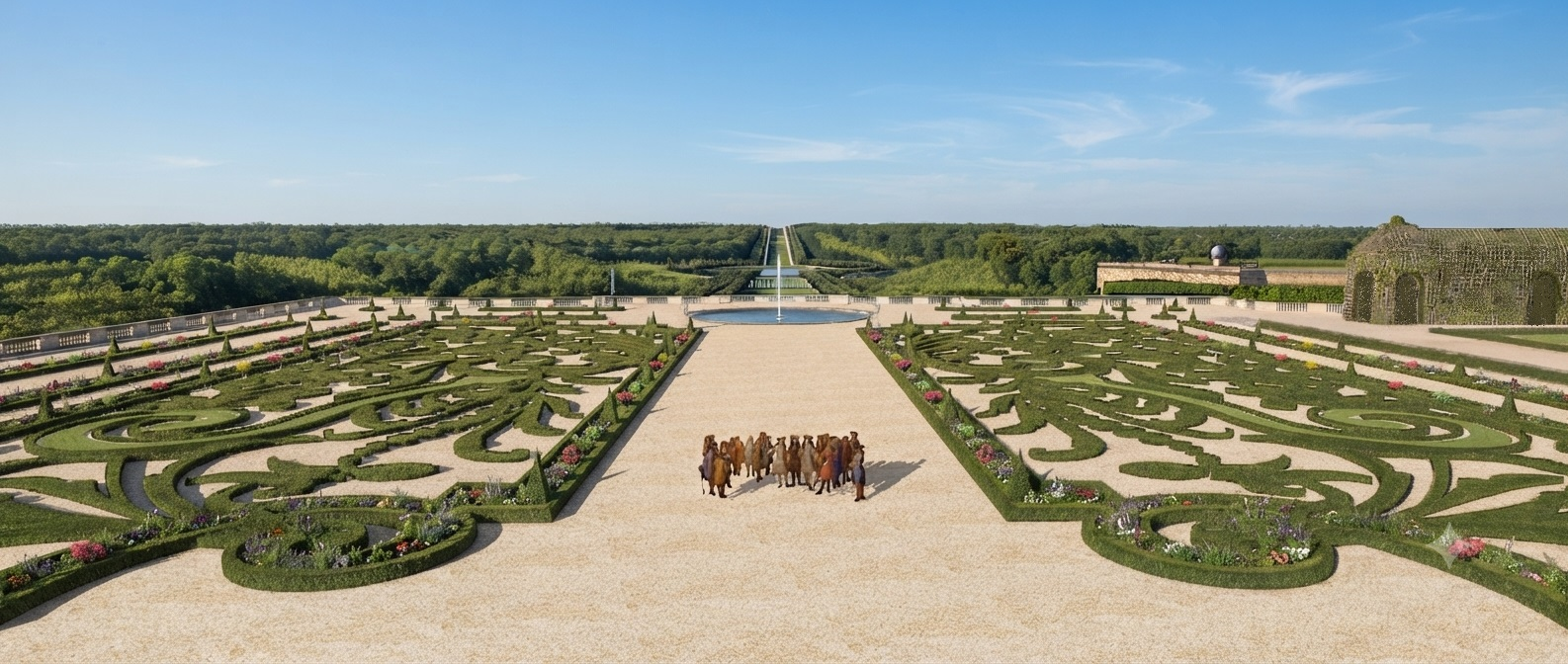
Restitution 3D de la vue depuis le balcon du premier étage du pavillon central du château-vieux de Meudon, vers 1690.

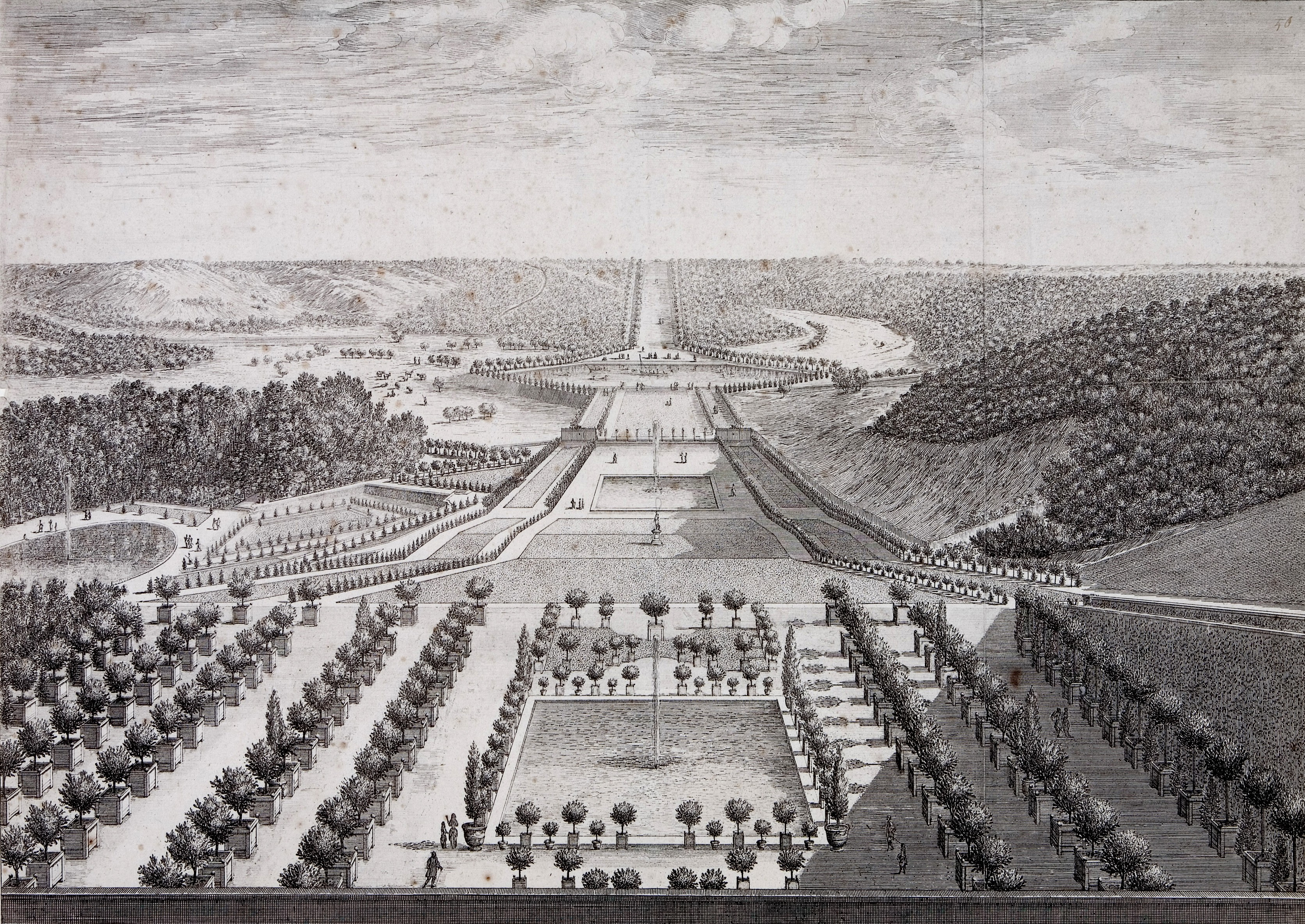
Estampe d'Israël Silvestre représentant la Grande Perspective de Meudon, vers 1685. Vue depuis le haut de l'Orangerie.

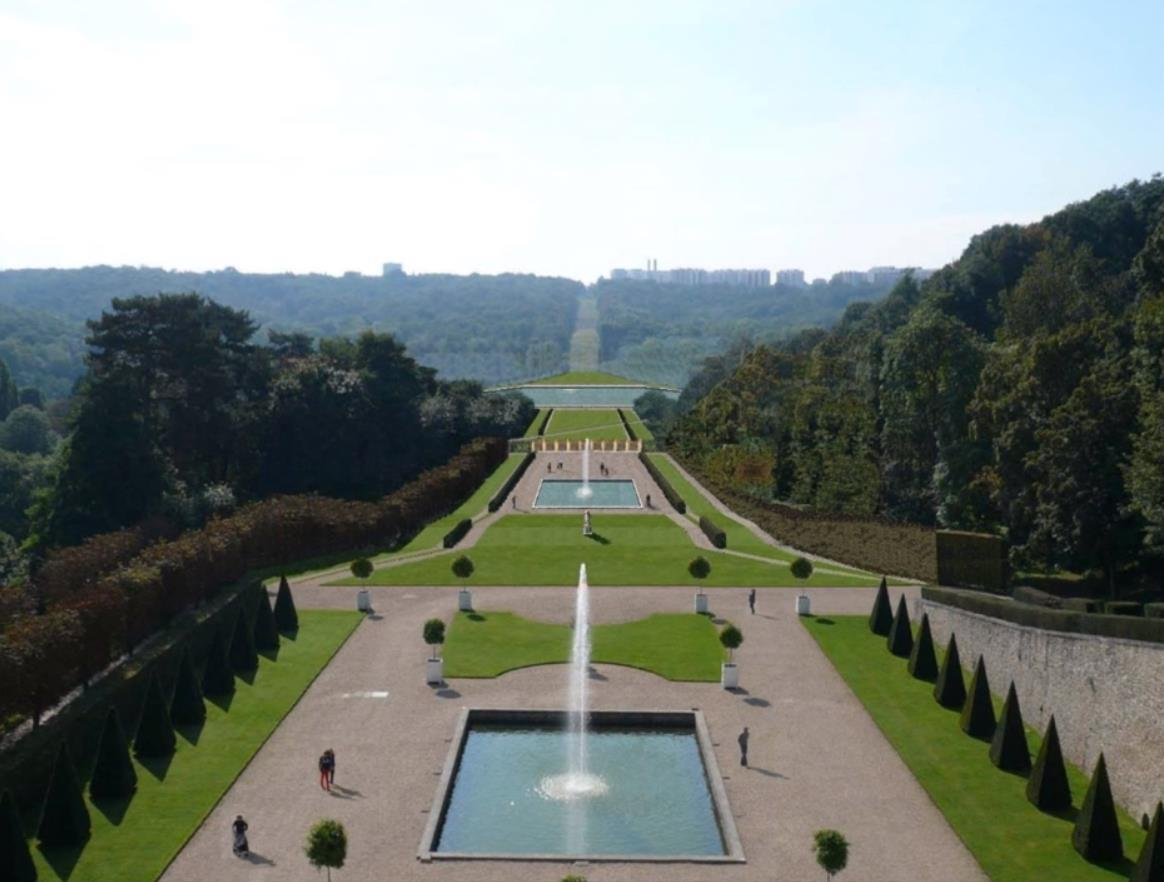
Restitution de la Grande Perspective de Meudon (photo-montage). par Gilles Fiant, 2017.

The Great Perspective is the monumental axis that organizes all the area of Meudon. It is perfectly rectilinear over a distance of 3.5 km, despite the unevenness of the terrain. It was created on both sides of the Château-Vieux, a place occupied from the beginning.

At its apogee, at the beginning of the eighteenth century, it was composed as follows (from north to south):

- Avenue du château (planted with four rows of trees)
- First ditches
- Front yard (on the right, terrace of the chestnut trees)
- Second ditches (buried under the terrace)
- Courtyard of the Château-Vieux, known as the royal court
- The Château-Vieux (destroyed, cellars preserved)
- The floor, designed by André Le Nôtre (destroyed)
- The Orangerie, of Louis Le Vau, with a circular basin
- The parterre of the Orangerie, with a rectangular basin
- Lawn, with a white marble statue, unidentified
- The basin known as the "Grand Carré" (destroyed)
- New lawn, shorter than first
- The water grid, with 10 jets of water (destroyed)
- Other lawn, longer
- The pond of Chalais (on the right, the carp channel)
- The Green Carpet
- The pavilion of Trivaux (under Louis XVI) (destroyed)

The axis ended at an alley drawn on the plateau of Trivaux.

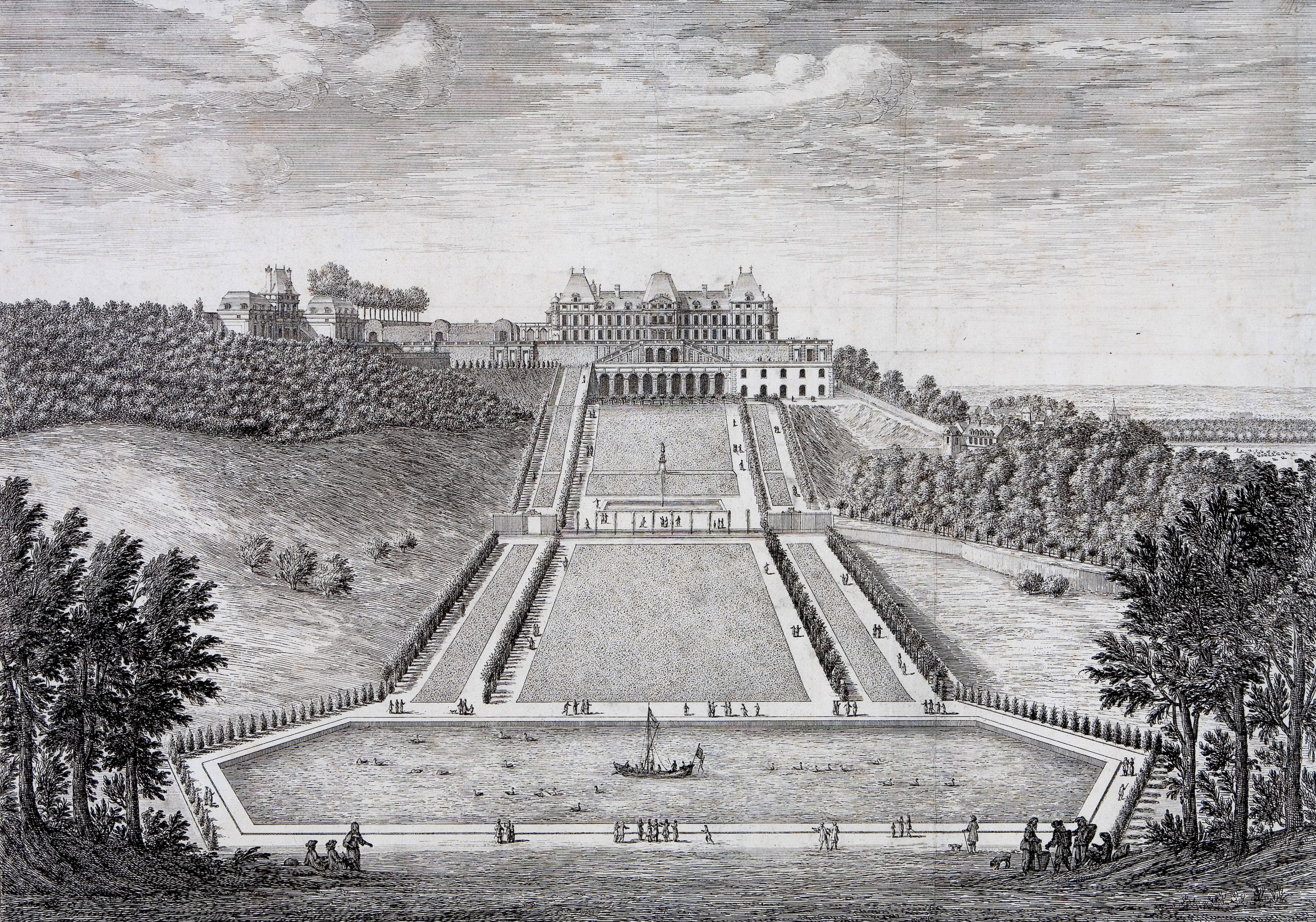
Estampe d'Israël Silvestre représentant la Grande Perspective de Meudon depuis le tapis vert. Vers 1685.

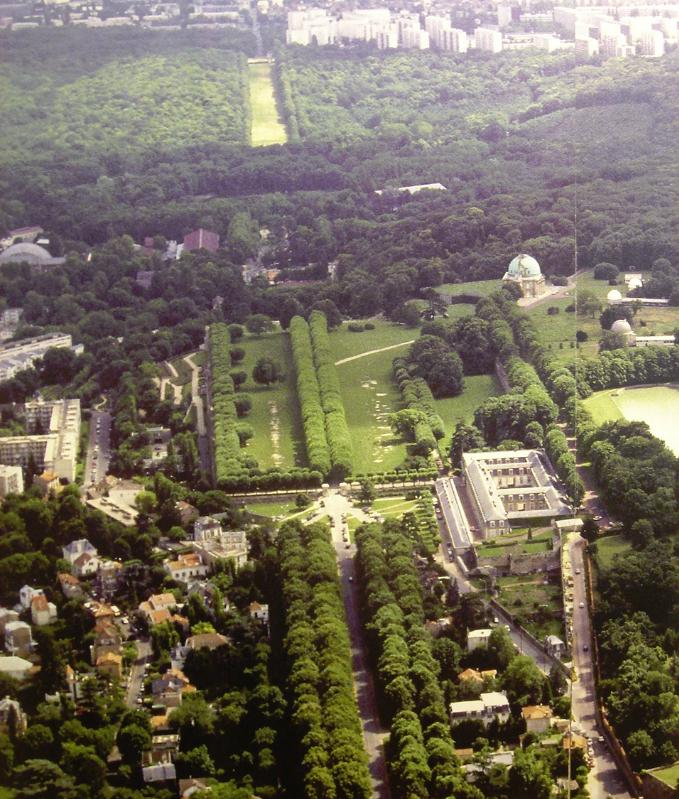
Vue aérienne de la Grande Perspective de Meudon.

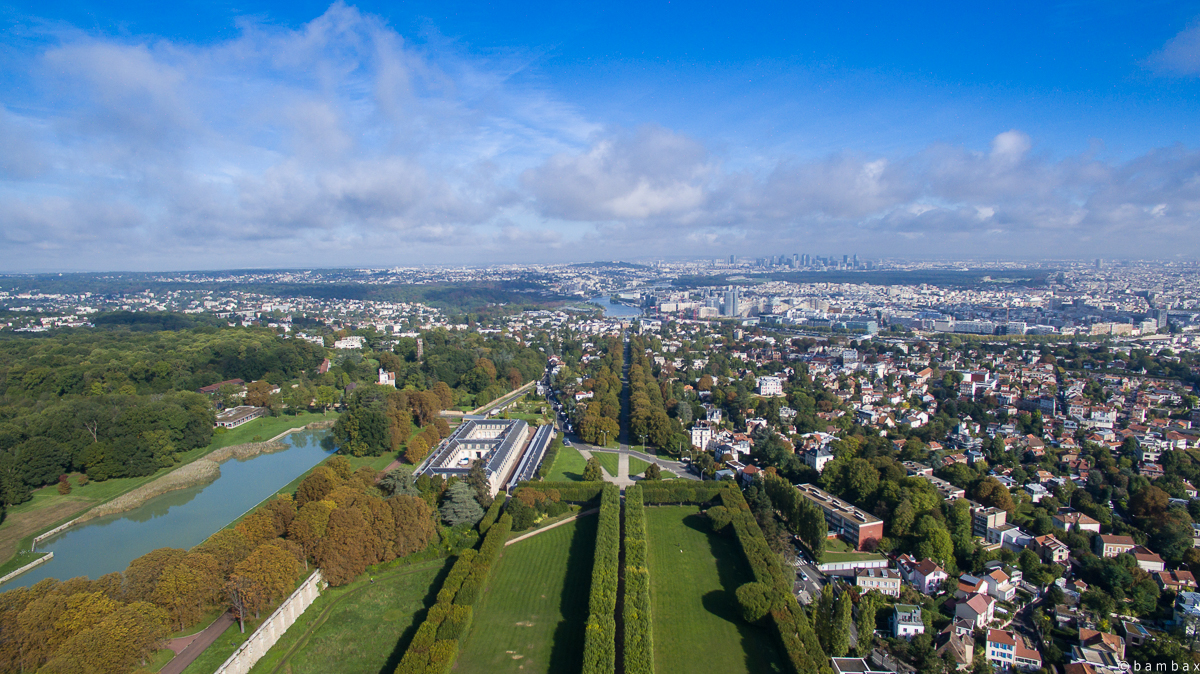
Vue aérienne par drône de l'avenue du château, en direction du nord.

==== Lower gardens ====
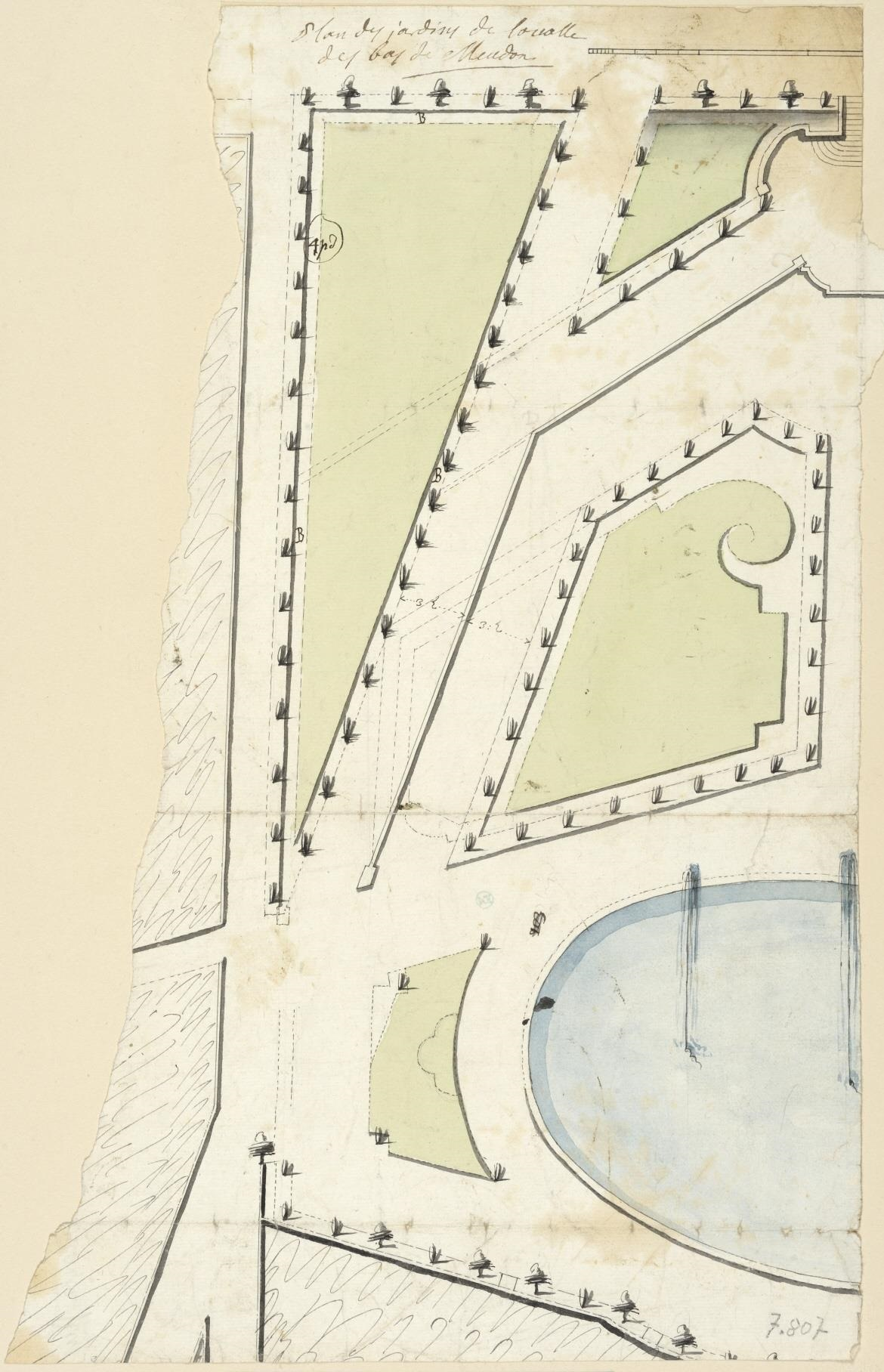
Drawing by André Le Nôtre for the Ovale. Nationalmuseum of Stockholm, Sweden

The low gardens were mainly developed by Louvois, and then embellished by Monseigneur and Louis XIV. Their different levels and the different points of view made the charm, as well as the presence of many water bodies and thousands of topiaries. It was accessed from the "Grand Carré" basin:

- The floor of the Oval;
- On the left, the channel of the shadow;
- On the right, the half-moon;
- The wood of Guenegaud, with its pavilion;
- The basin of the octagon;
- Below, the "play of M. Le Nostre", framed by two cascades;
- In the background, the vertugadin, going up.
- On the left, Cleopatra's grove;
- The Arthelon canal
- The Arthelon waterfall
- The chestnut grove
- The Small Grotto of the Hotel Courtin
- The parterre of the Hôtel Courtin
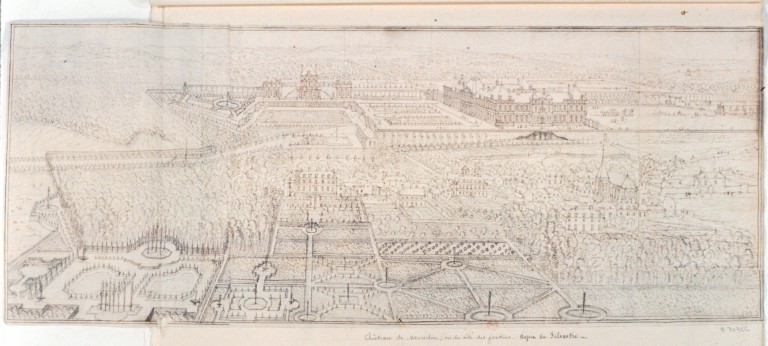
Les jardins bas de Meudon (The Lower Gardens of Meudon), by Israel Silvestre, 17th century, BNF

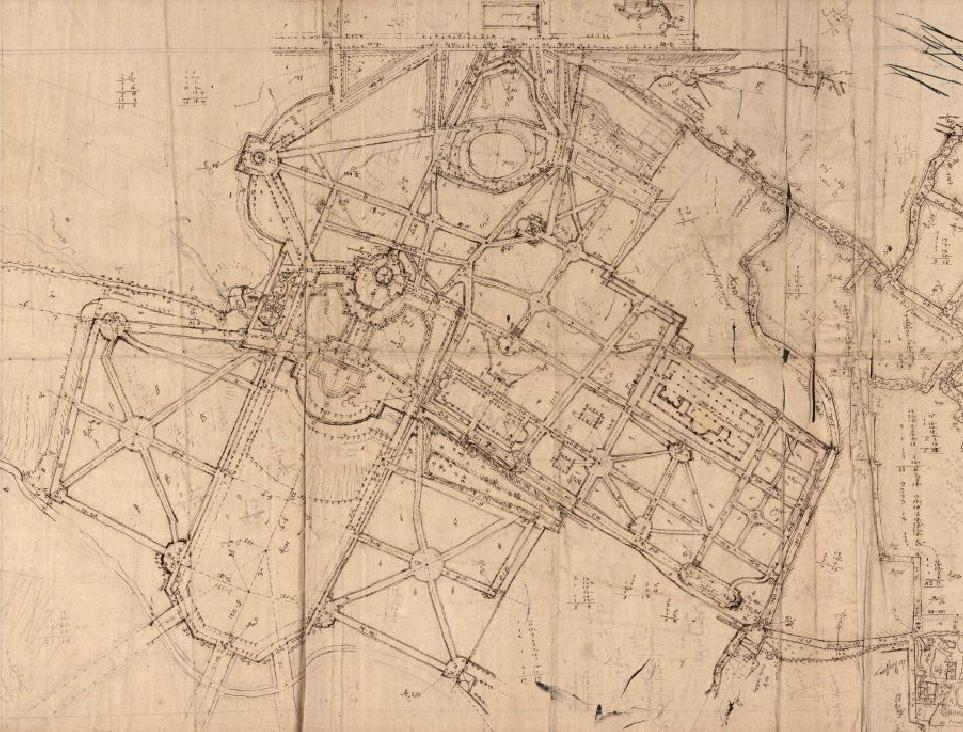
Detail of the lower gardens on the draft plan for the gardens at Meudon. ADY (78). Circa 1697

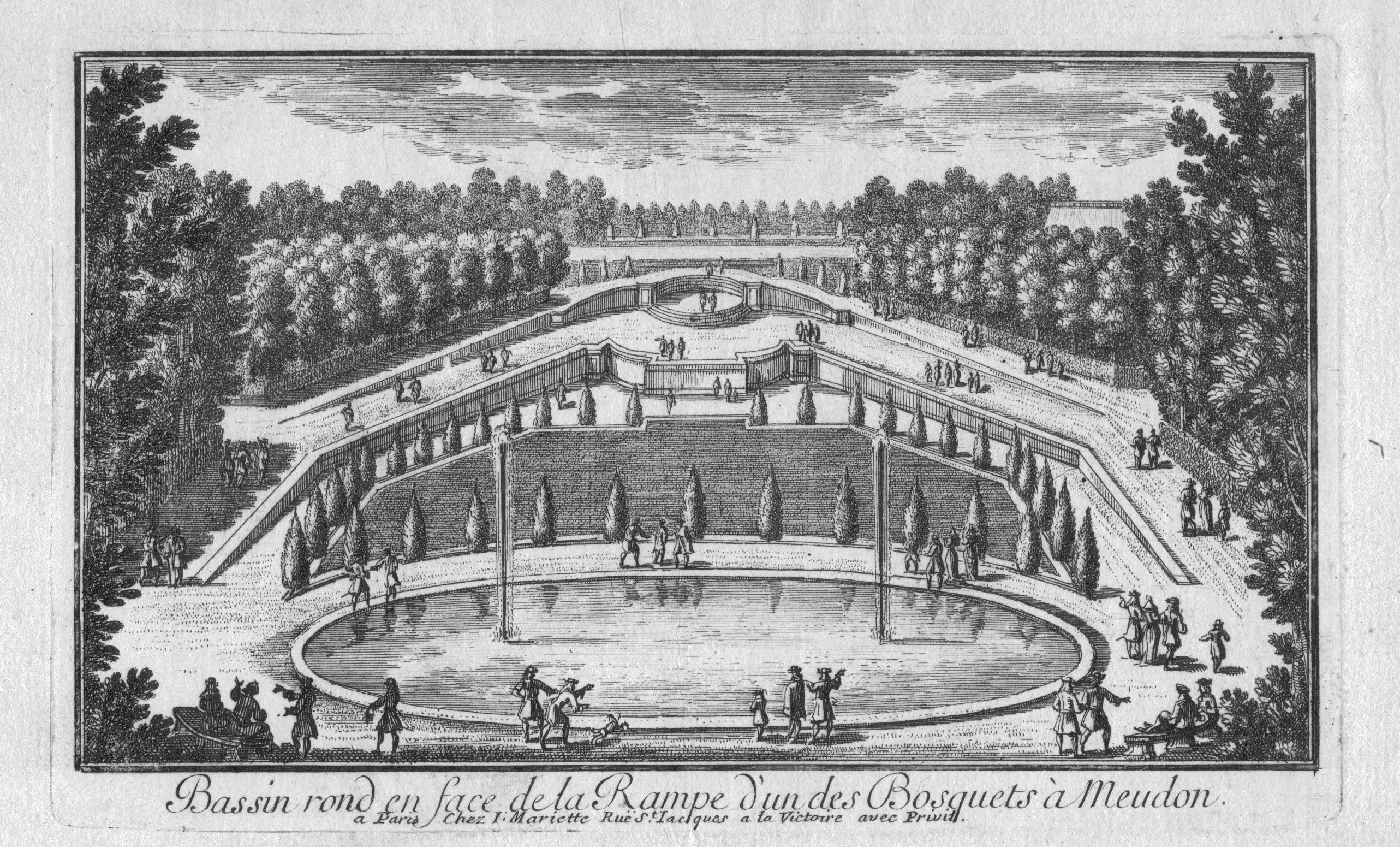
Le bassin de l'Ovale, jardins bas de Meudon. Circa 1690

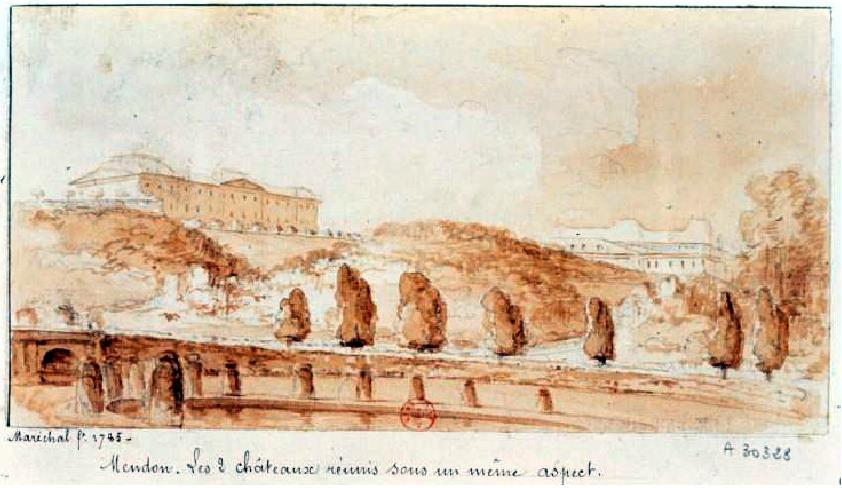
"Meudon. Les 2 châteaux réunis sous un même aspect", drawing by Jean-Baptiste Maréchal, 1785. View from the Ovale

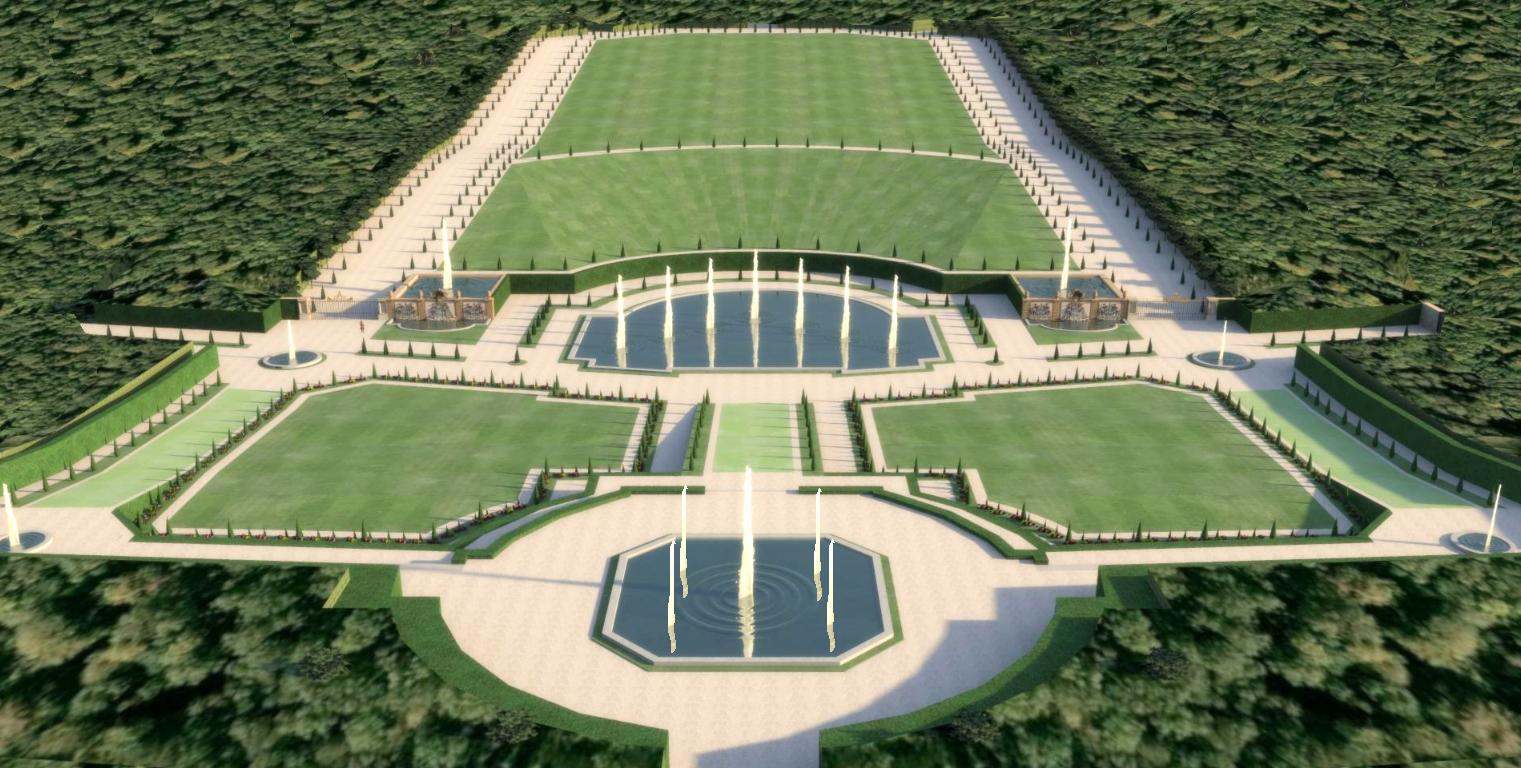
Restitution 3D des jardins bas, avec la "pièce de M. Le Nostre". Condition circa 1700

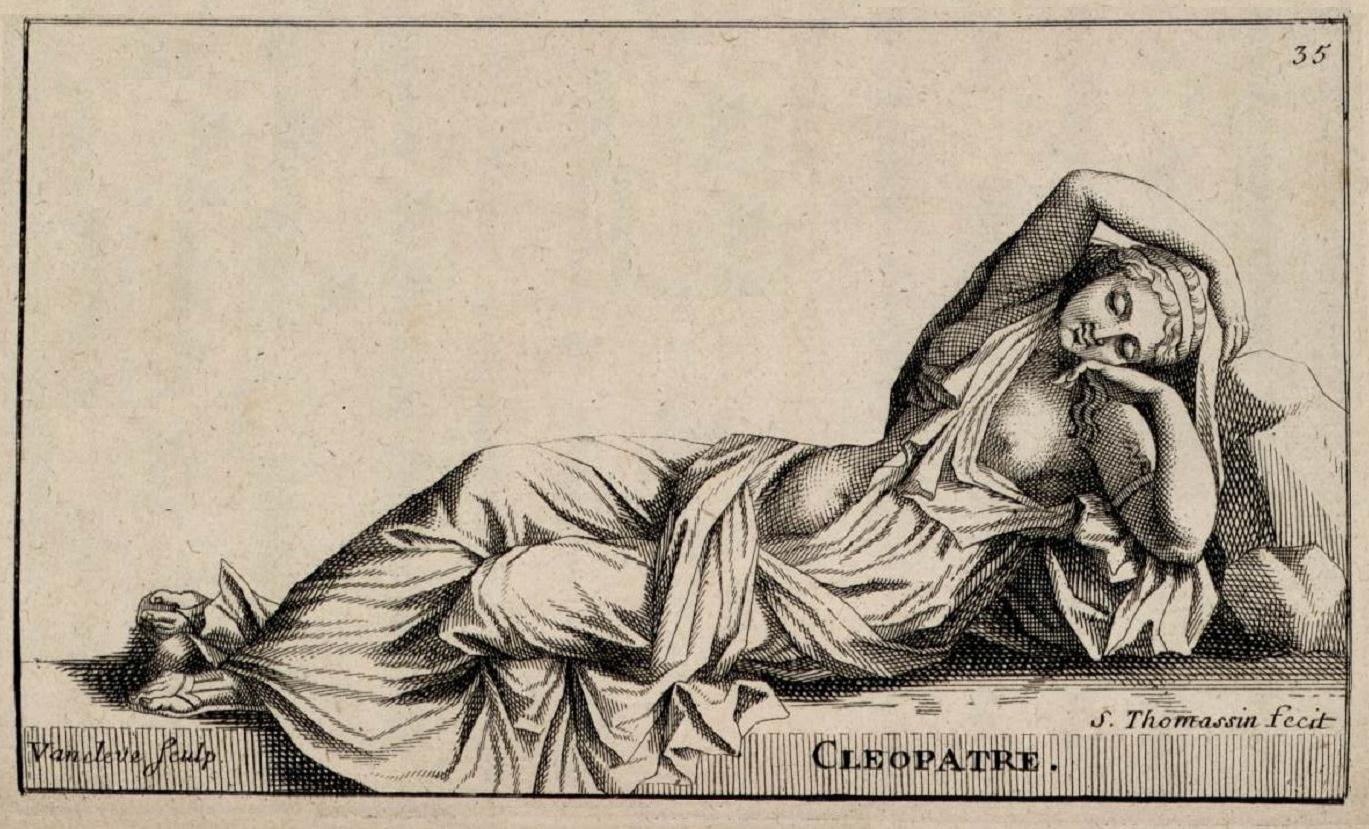
Ariadne endormie (Ariane Sleeping), known at the time as "Cléopâtre", copy placed in the low gardens

==== High gardens ====
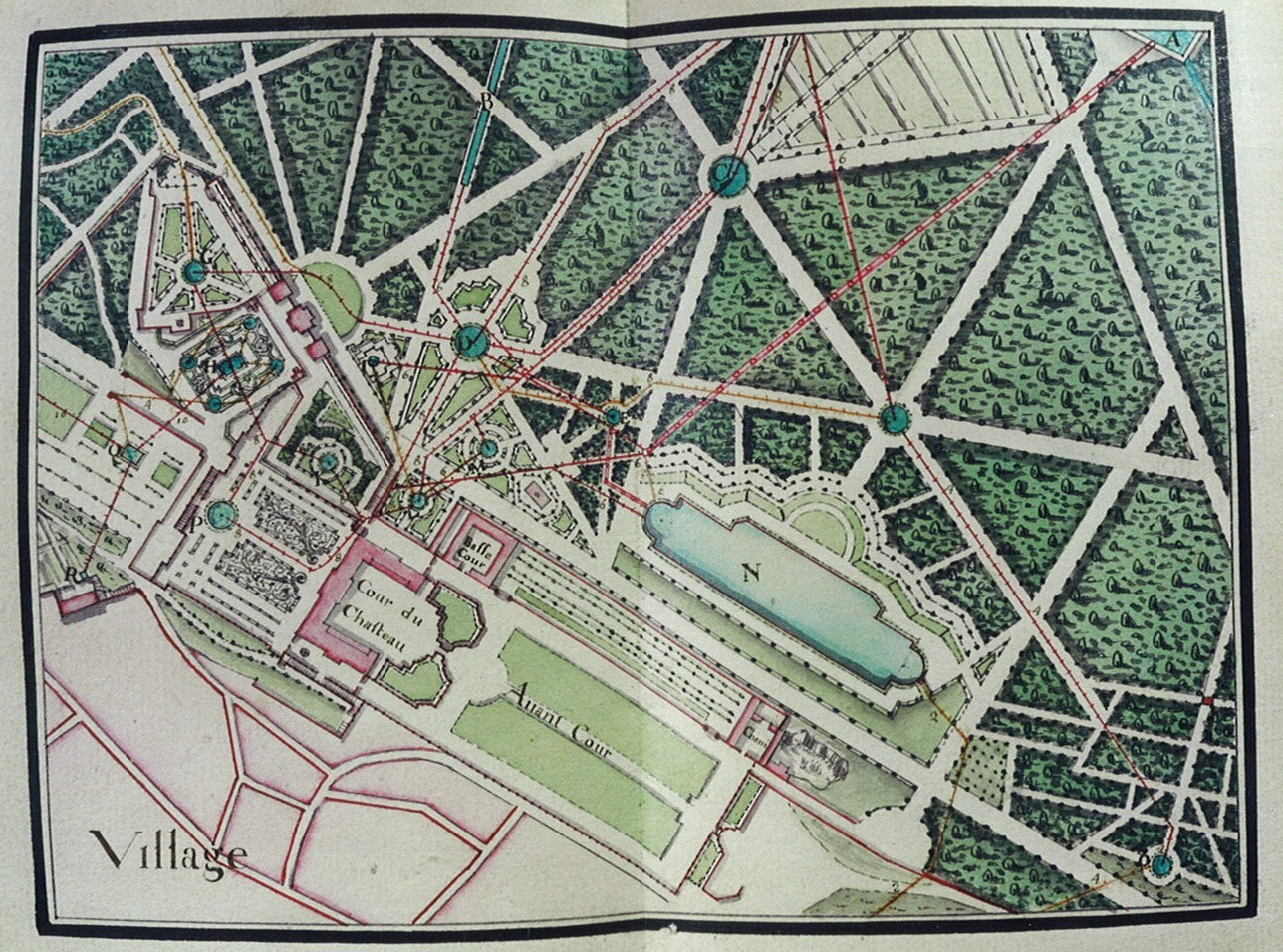
Traité des Eaux de Meudon, 1699, par Nyon. Les jardins hauts.

The area of the high gardens is nearly three times larger than that of the low gardens. The hold of these high gardens is still preserved today, occupied mainly by the Paris Observatory. The gardens consisted of a labyrinthine network of walkways, embellished with numerous bodies of water. Unlike the low gardens, the high gardens were mainly flat, since they were planted on the hill of Meudon. There were:

- The parterre of the Grotto, then parterre of the Château-Neuf in 1708
- The Cradles, simplified in 1708
- The floor of the Globe
- The parterre des Bois
- The Calotte
- The Parasol
- The Gladiator
- The Grove of the Cloisters
- The Bel Air Basin
- The gardens of Montafilan, with the stone cabinet
- The bastion of the Capuchins, which served as a point of view on Paris and Saint-Cloud.
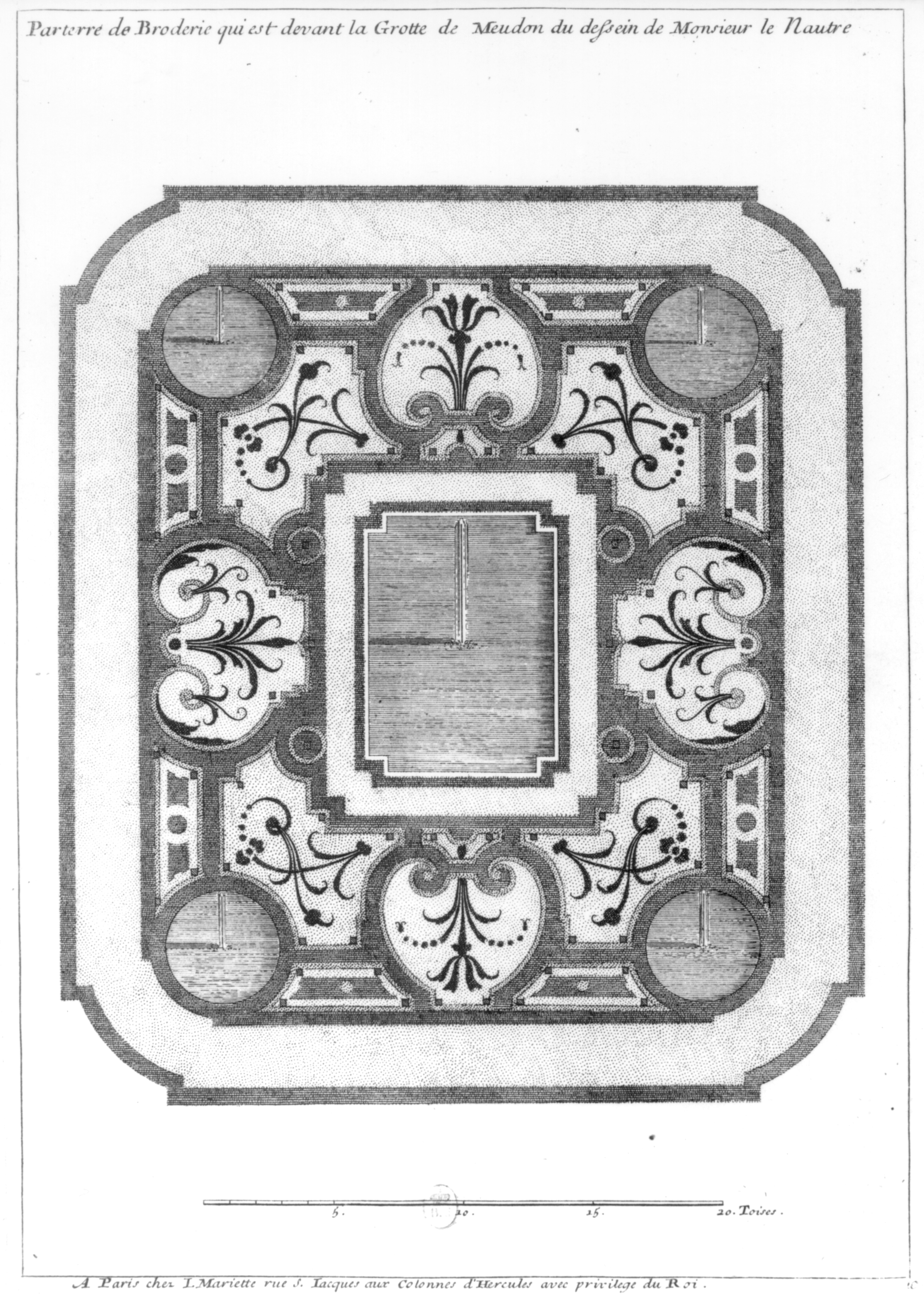
The parterre of the Grotto, engraved by Mariette

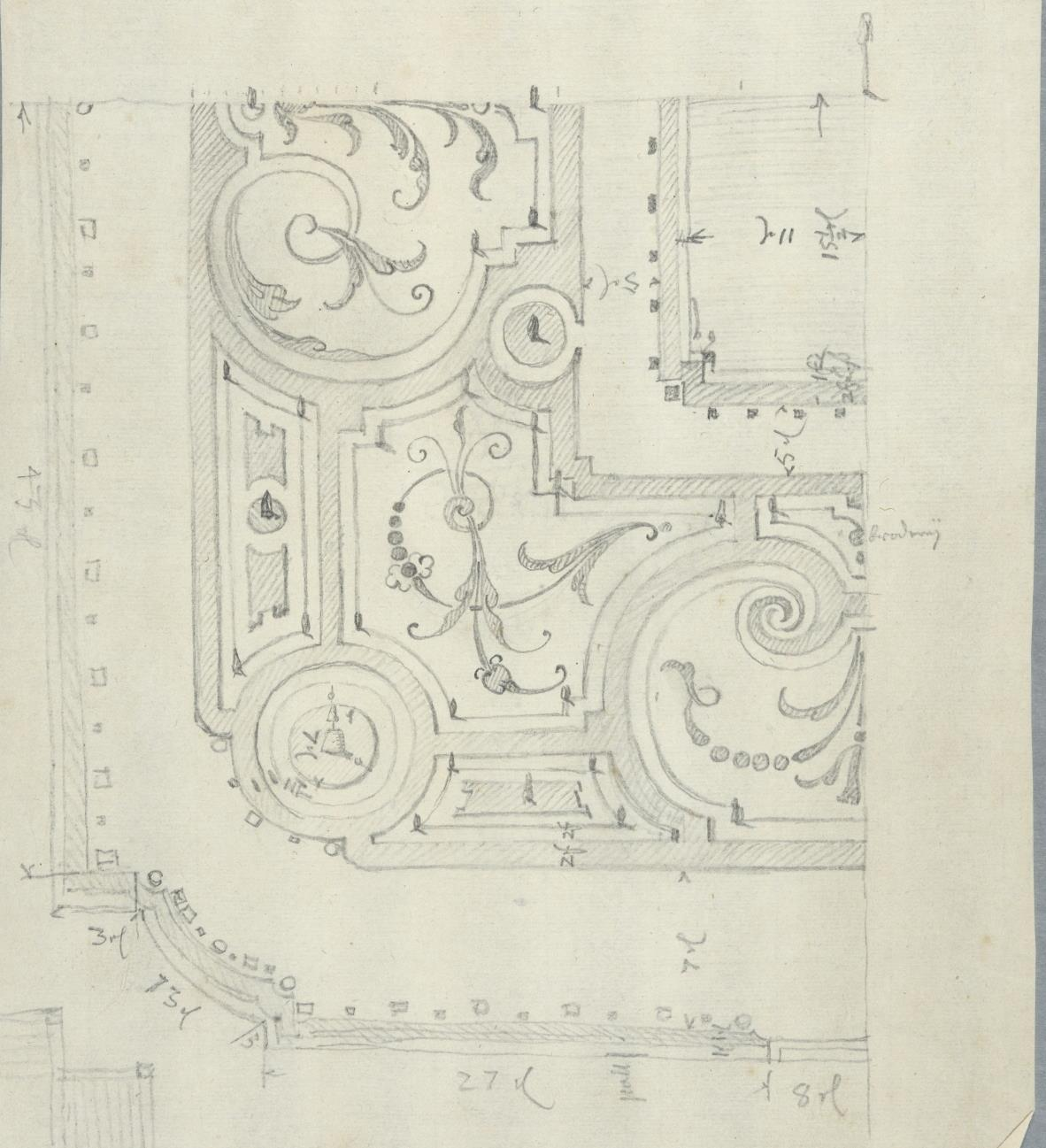
Quarter of the parterre of the Grotto. Nationalmuseum of Stockholm. Condition of parterre between 1680 and 1708

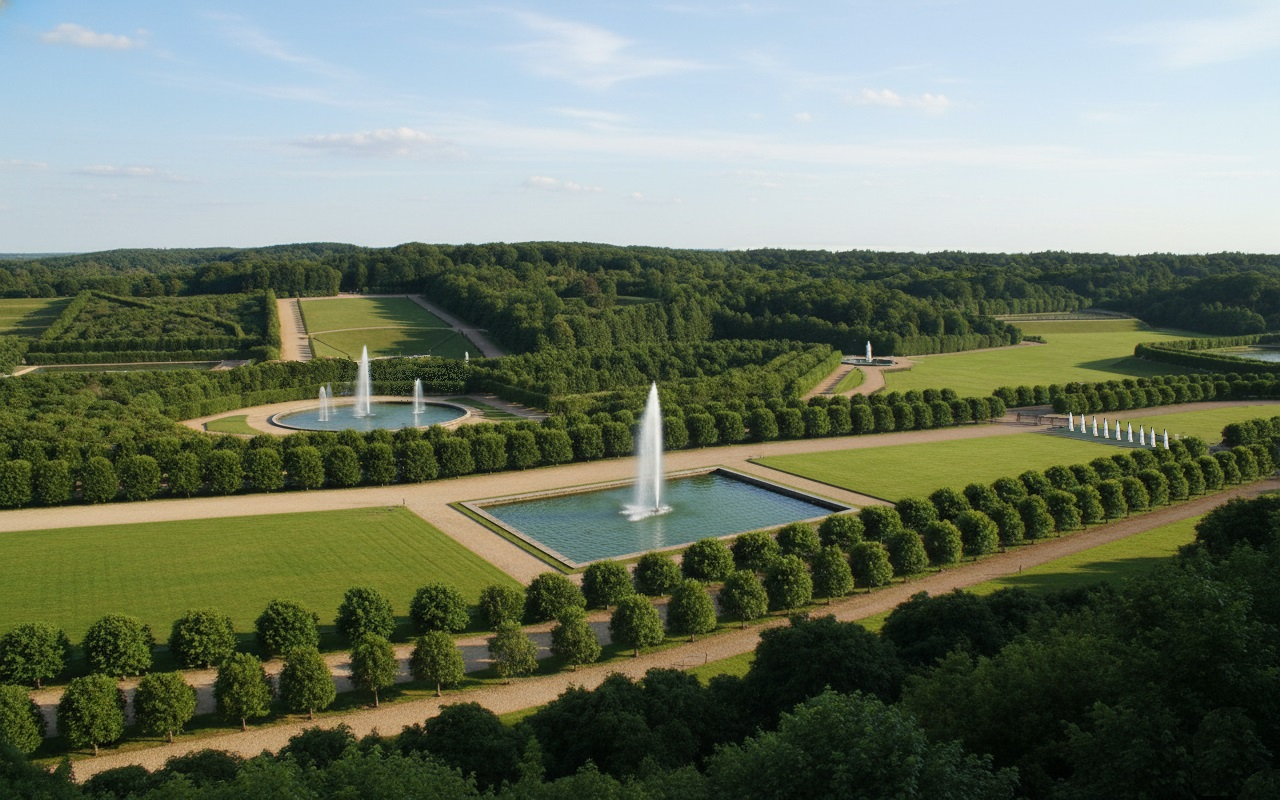
Recreated view from the "Parasol", circa 1700

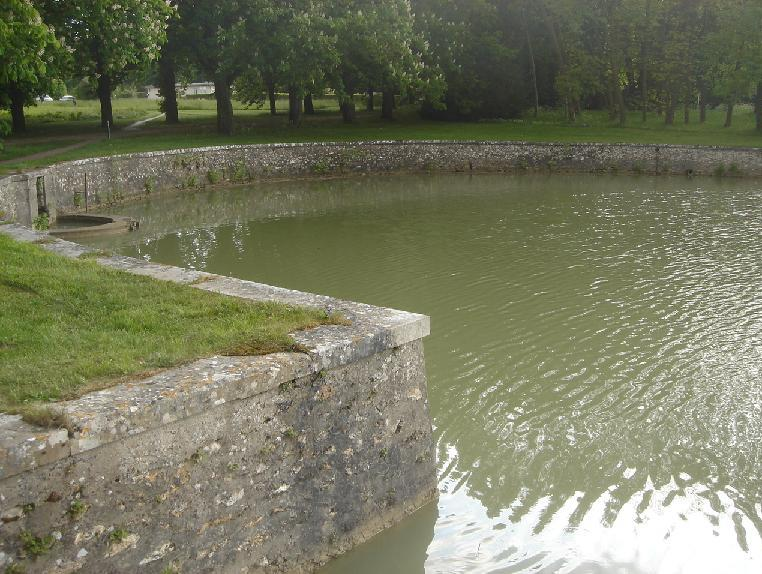
South semi-circle of the Bel Air basin, 2010

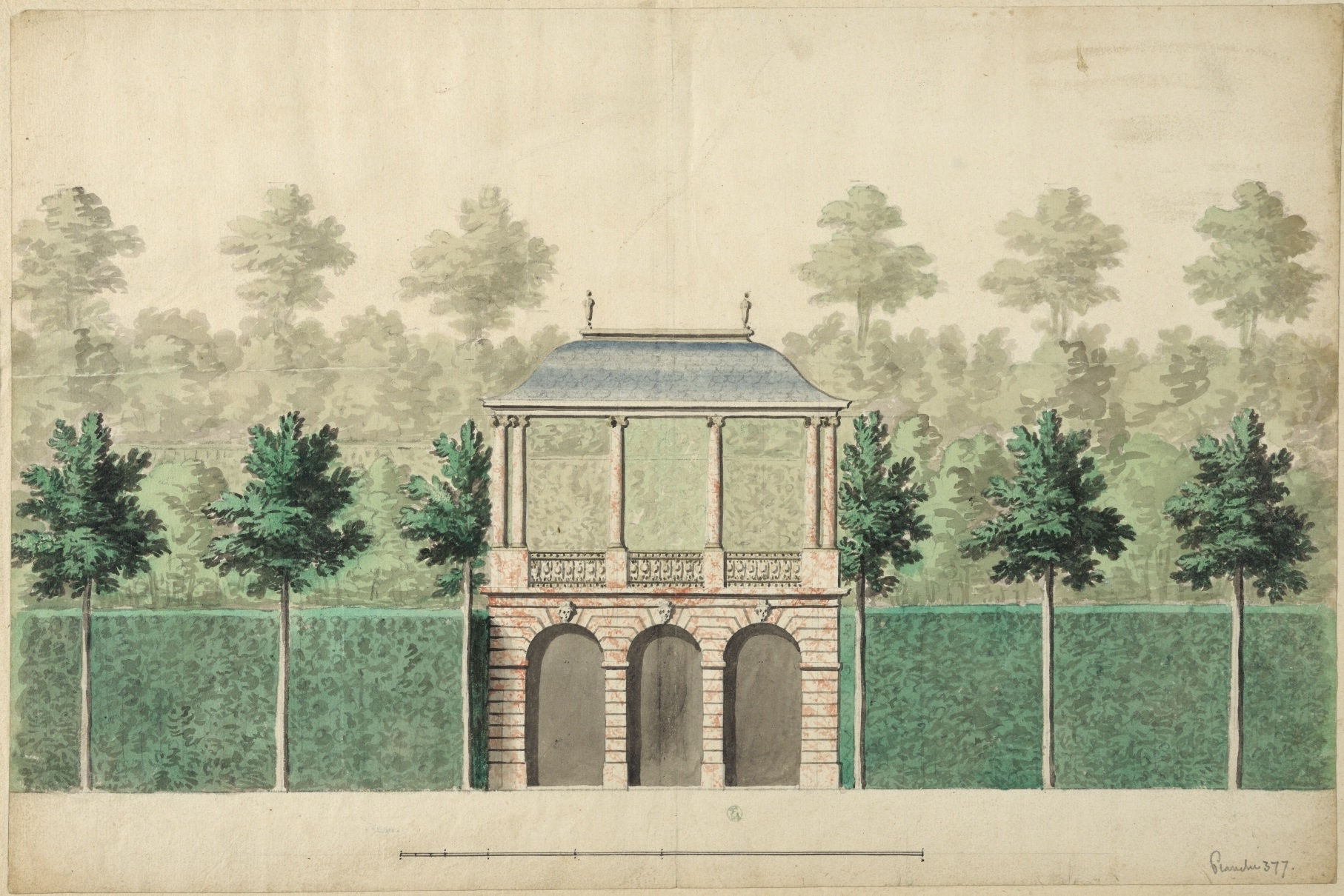
Elévation du cabinet de pierre des jardins hauts de Meudon, du côté de Montafilan (près des Capucins). Nationalmuseum de Stockholm, NMH THC 377.

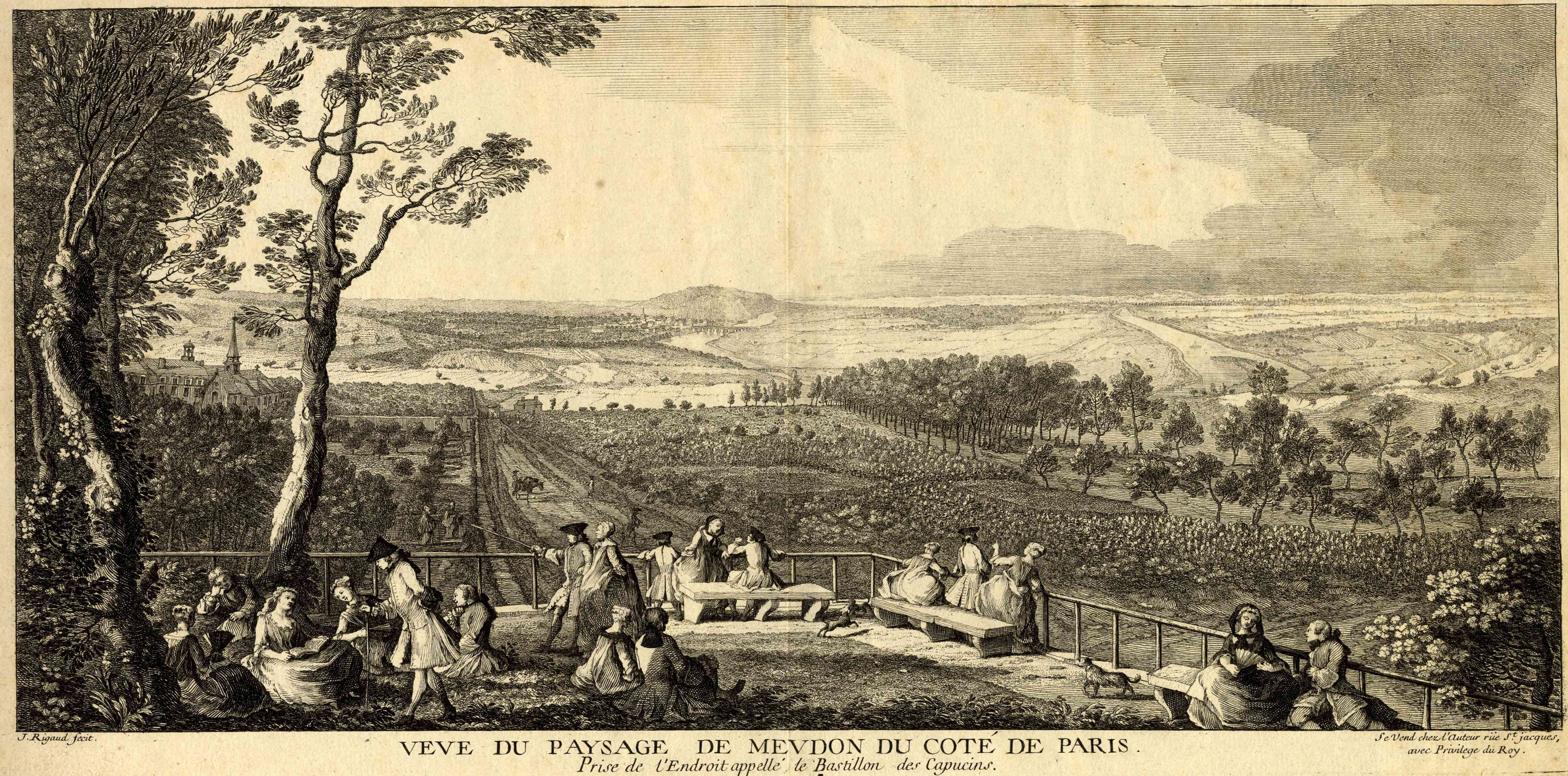
View from the bastion of the Capucins, Jacques Rigaud, circa 1730

=== Park and ponds ===
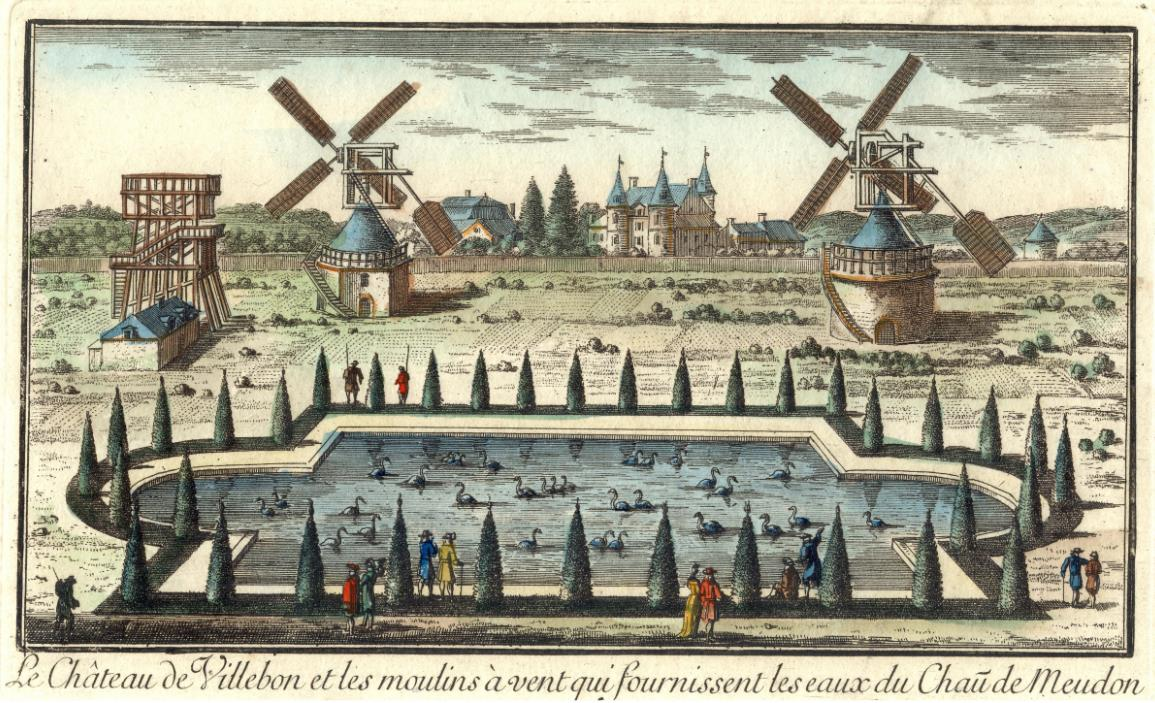
The windmills of Villebon, on the heights of Meudon

The park of Meudon extended as far as Chaville, and thence reached that of Versailles. The elevation of the terrain, the dense forest, the numerous ponds, the great plains situated on the heights are the main features of this park in the 17th and 18th centuries. These included:

- The pond of the Garenne
- The Triveau pond
- The pond of the Fountains
- The pond of Vilbon
- The Renault Fosse pond
- The Tronchet pond
- The old tank
- The new tank
- The leg of Oye
- The farm of Vilbon, with the watermills

The pond called Meudon was not created until the 20th century.

The historical library of the city of Versailles preserves a manuscript of the reservoirs of Meudon, embossed with the arms of the Grand Dauphin, dating about 1700.

Maps of the reservoirs and ponds at Meudon, Bibliothèque historique de Versailles.

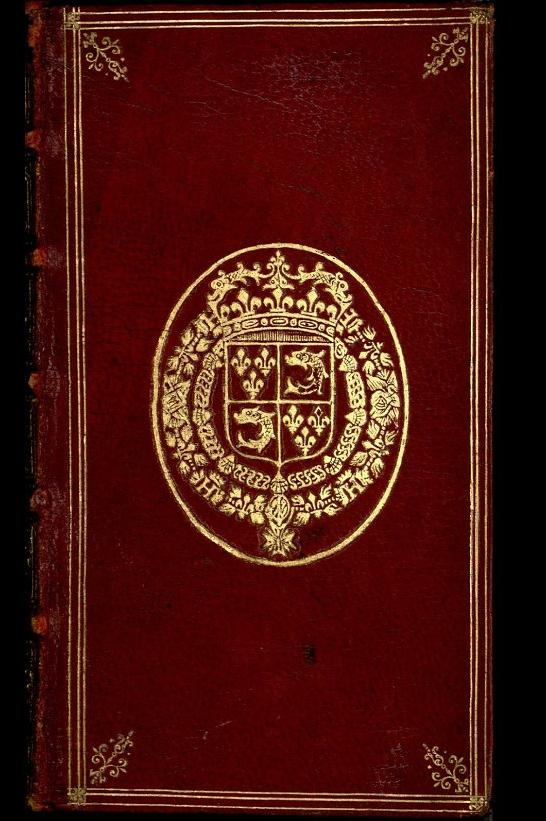
Binding with the arms of the dauphin

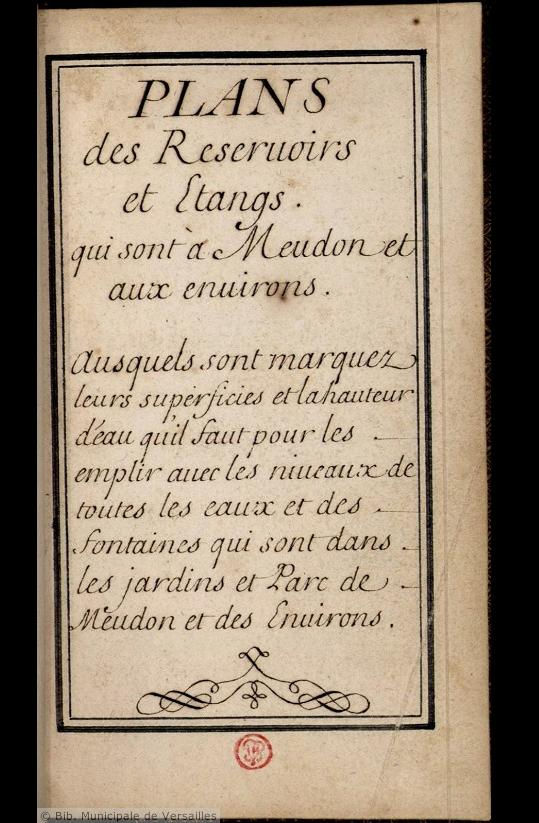
Title page

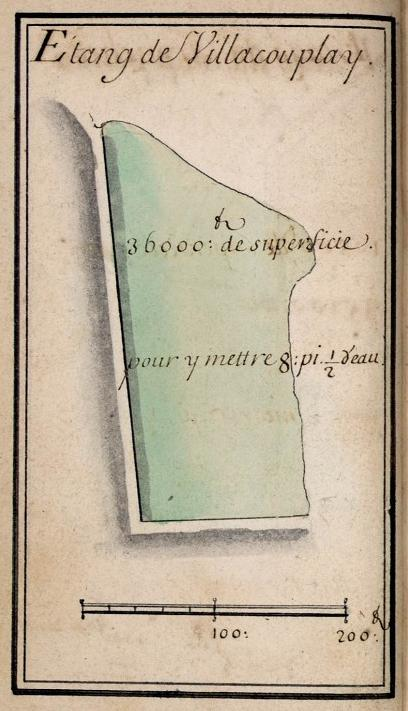
Villacouplay pond

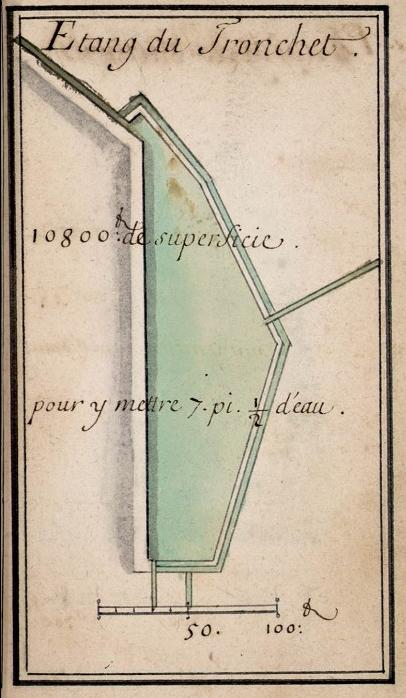
Tronchet pond

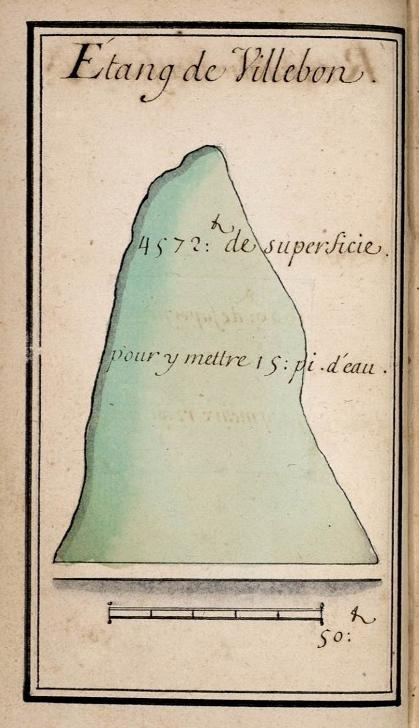
Villebon pond

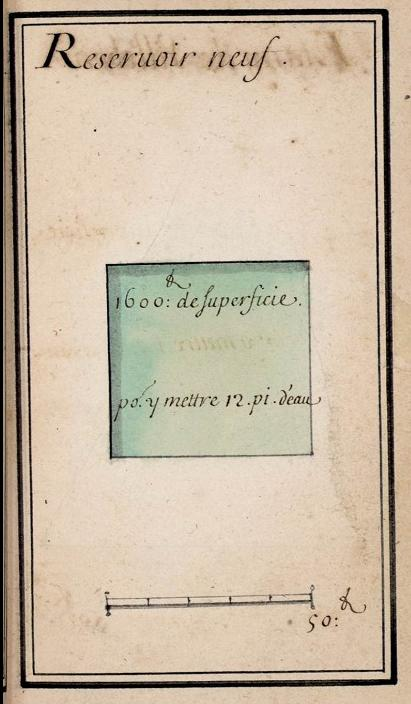
New reservoir

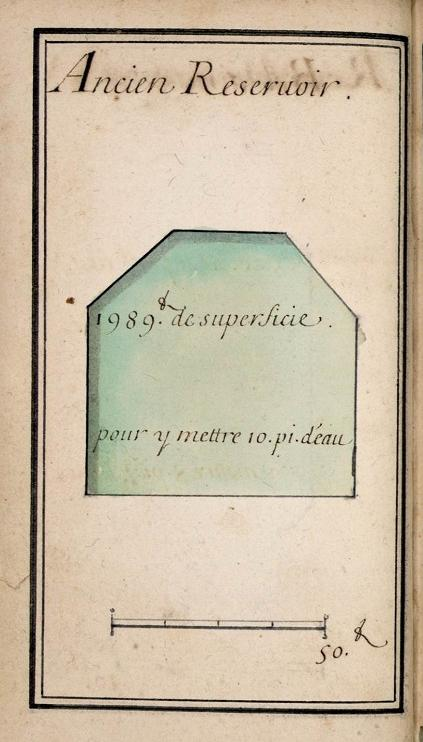
Old reservoir

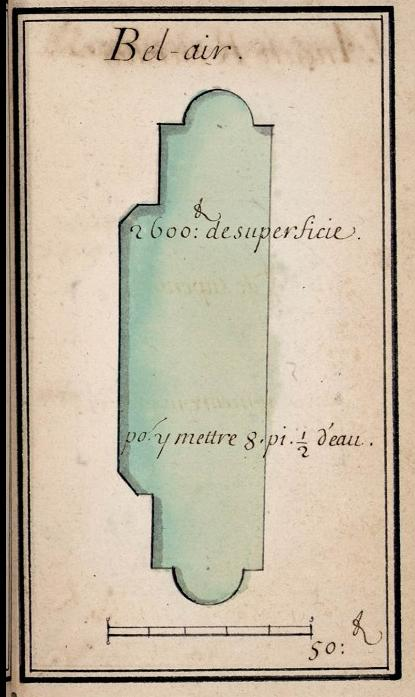
Bel air

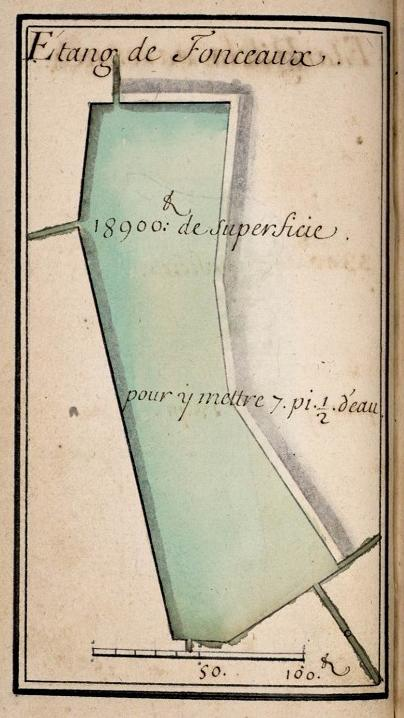
Pond of the fonceaux

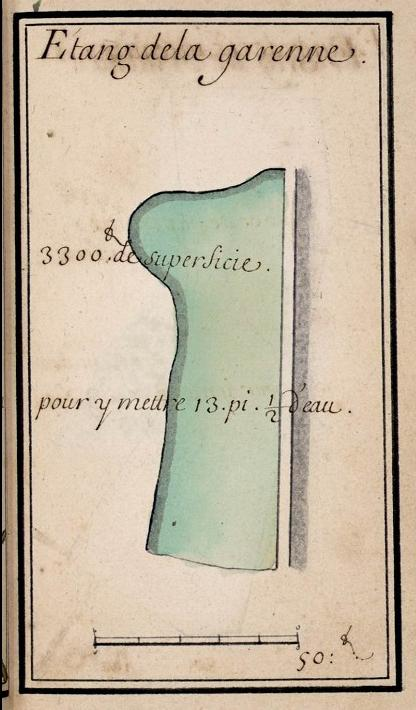
Pond of the garenne

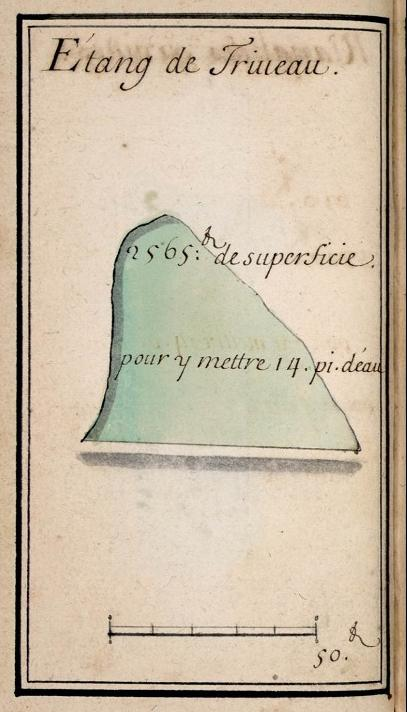
Pond of Triveau

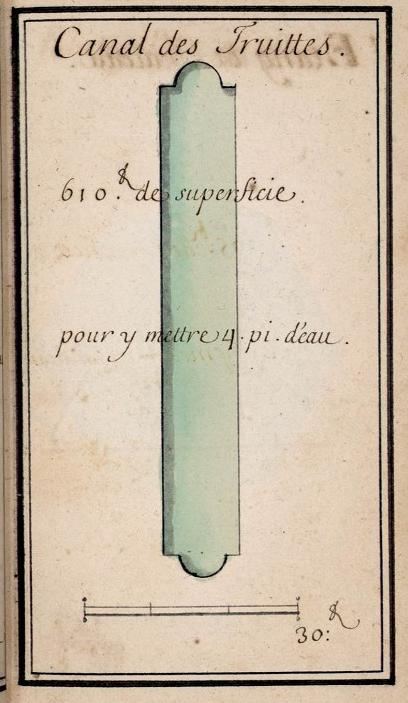
Trout canal

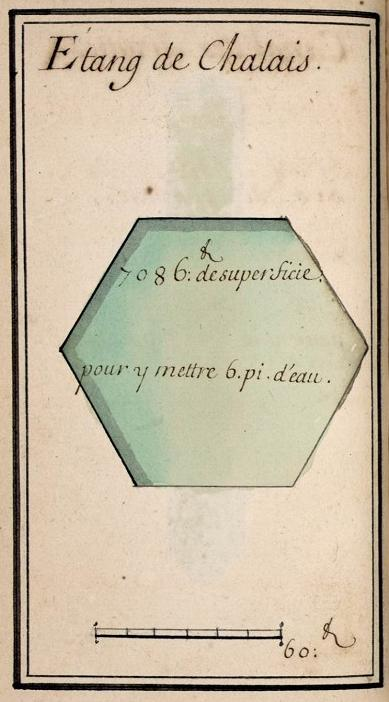
Pond of Chalais

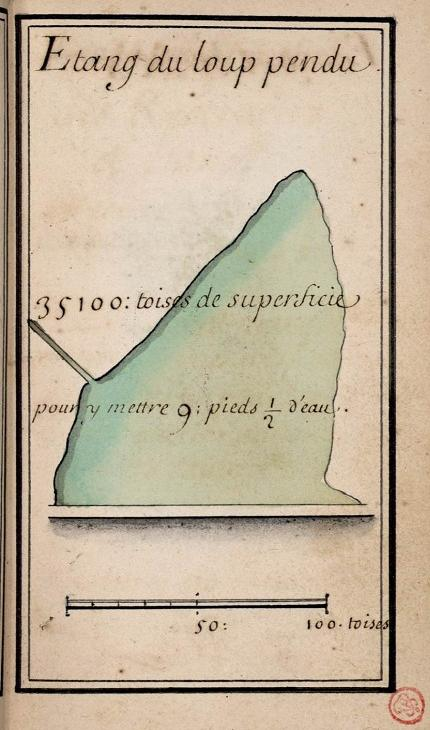
Etang du loup pendu

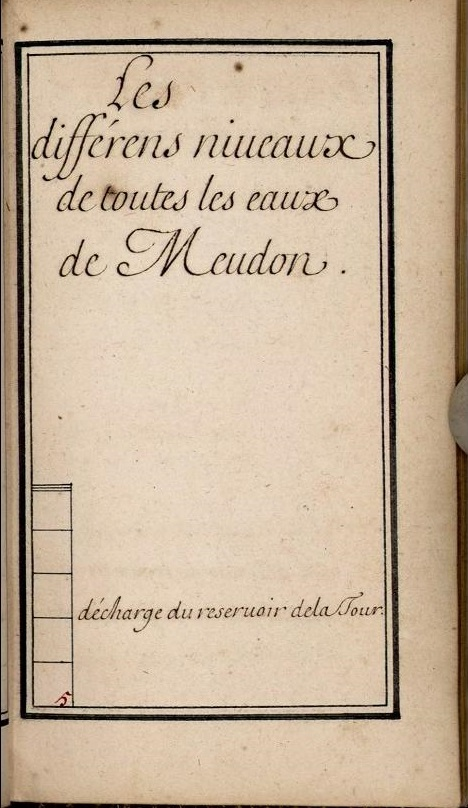
the different levels

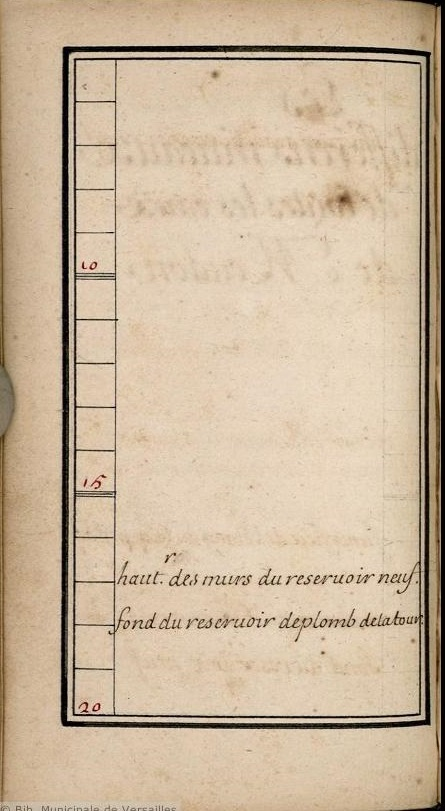
(suite)

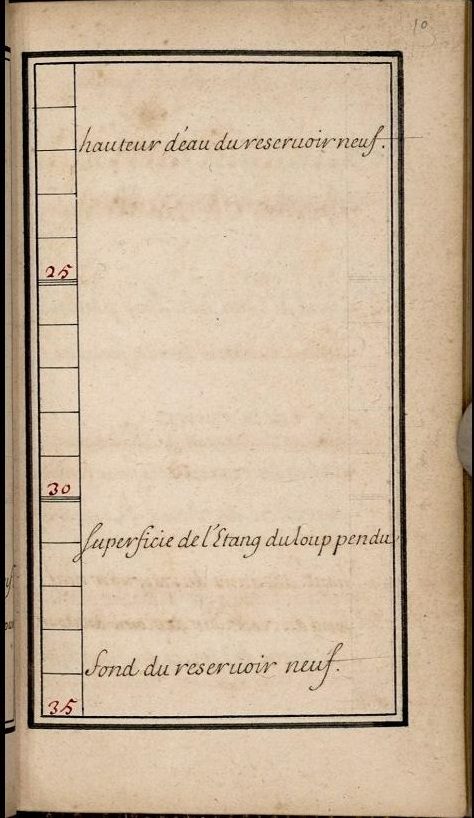
(suite)

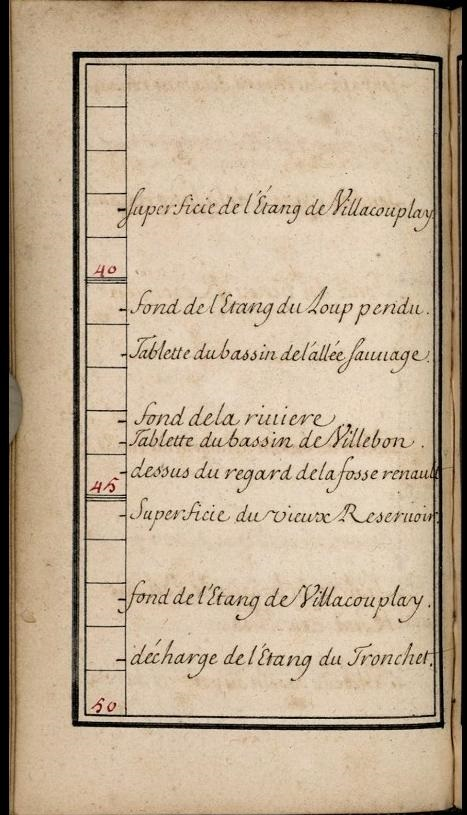
(suite)

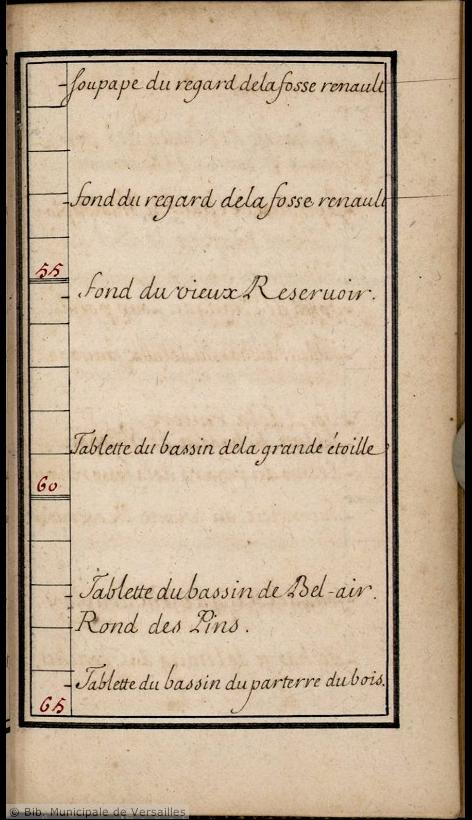
(suite)

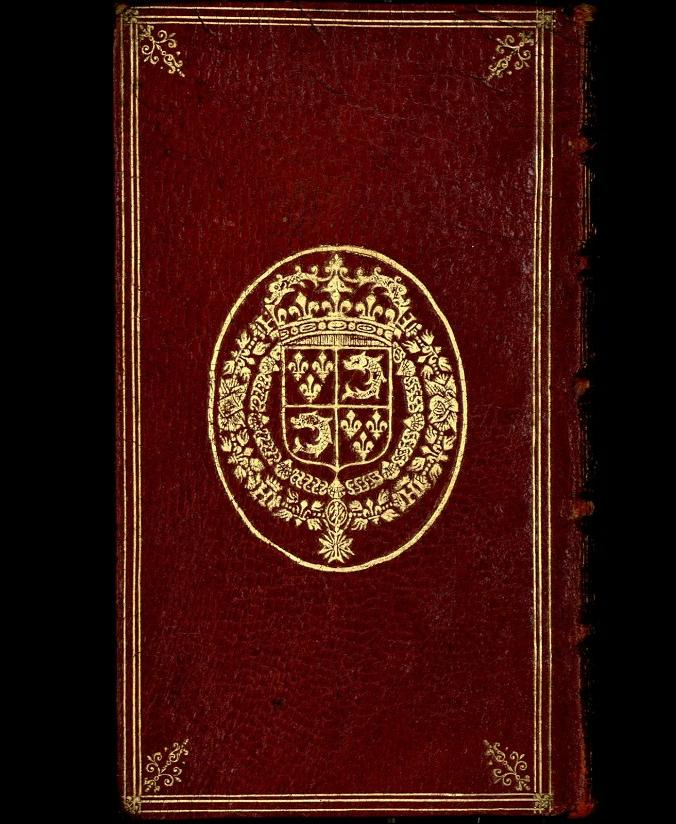
Binding with arms

=== The village of Meudon ===
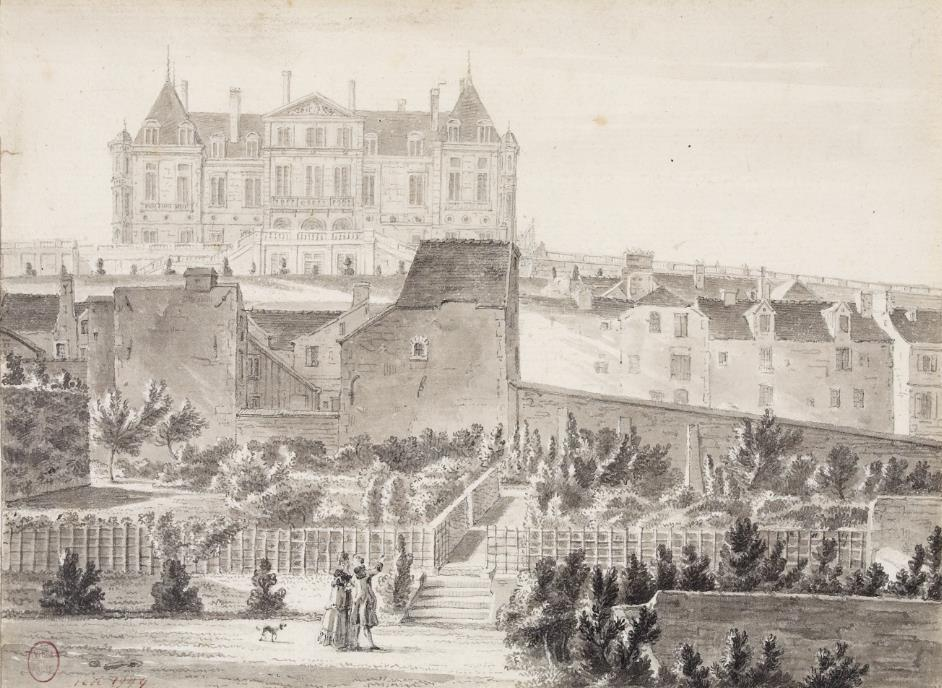
View of the Château-Vieux and of the village of Meudon below. 18th century.

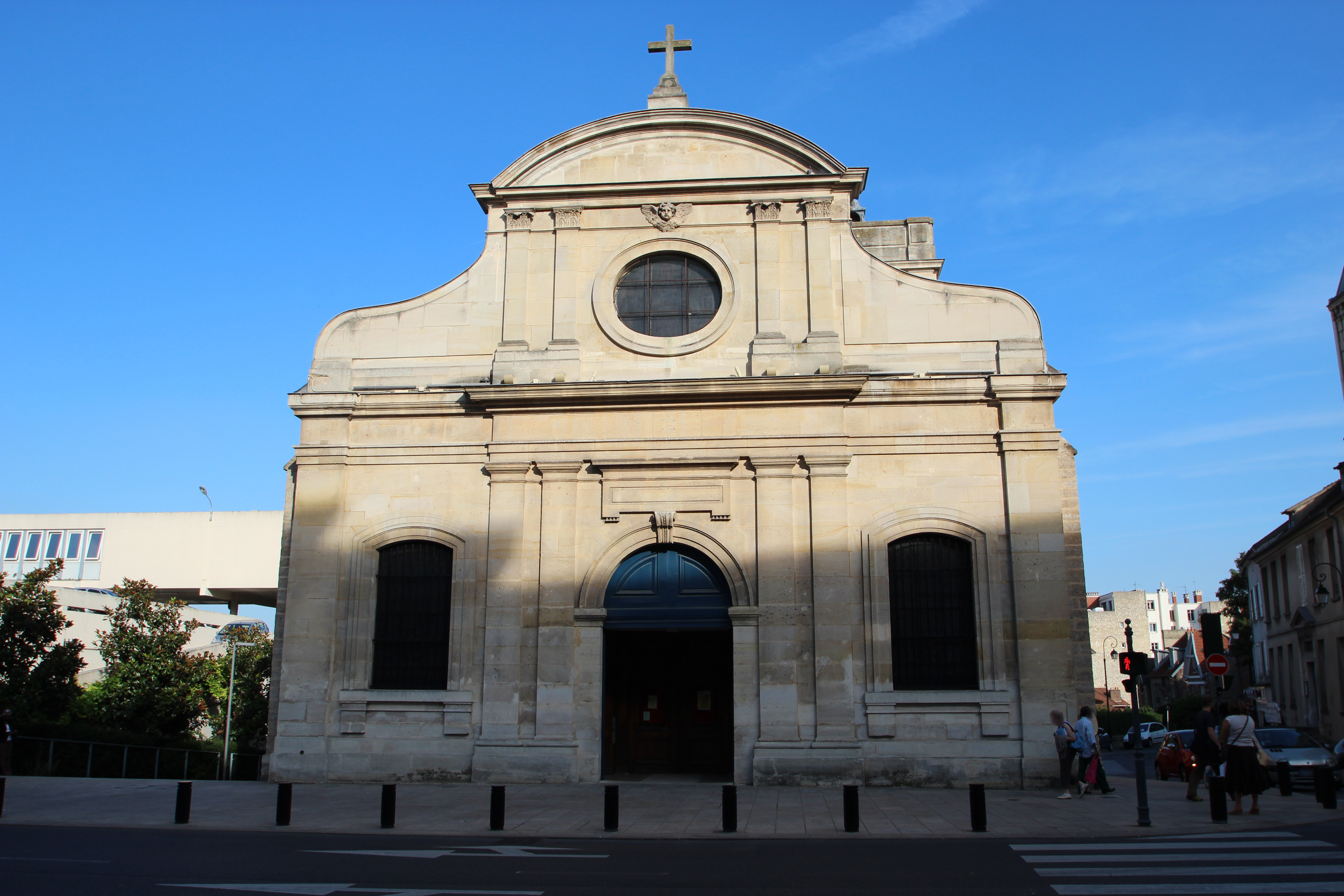
Église Saint-Martin in Meudon today

The village of Meudon was made up of numerous hôtels and properties, the largest of which belonged to persons linked to the owners of the castle. These included:

- Saint Martin's Church, (preserved)
- Hotel Henri du Plessis-Guénégaud (demolished)
- Hotel Bellon, (demolished)
- Hotel Richer, (preserved)
- Hotel Tourmont, (preserved)
- hôtel of the Countess of Verrue (preserved)
- Castle of Fleury (demolished)
- The country house of Madame de La Fayette in Fleury
- Folly by Jean-Jacques Huvé, (preserved)
- Villa of Jean-François Jacqueminot
- Gallyot hotel in Fleury, (demolished)
- House of Pierre-Joseph Redouté
- House of Bastide, then house of Bailly. (Demolished)
- Convent of the Capuchin Friars Minor, the first of this order installed in France by the care of the Cardinal of Lorraine

All these buildings and gardens were visible from the castle or its gardens.

== Sources ==
- Carroll, Stuart (2009). Martyrs and Murderers, The Guise Family and the Making of Europe. Oxford University Press.
- Fiske Kimball, The Creation of the Rococo, (Philadelphia Museum of Art) 1943.
